= Ontario Highway 8 =

Ontario provincial highway

Highway 8
- A map of Highway 8 Highway 8 Waterloo Regional Road 8 (Cambridge) Connecting Links

Route information
- Maintained by Ministry of Transportation of Ontario
- Length: 159.7 km (99.2 mi)
- Existed: August 1918–present

Major junctions
- West end: Highway 21 – Goderich
- Highway 7 – Stratford; Highway 85 – Kitchener; Highway 401 – Cambridge; Highway 5 – Waterdown
- East end: City Road 8 (near Dundas)

Location
- Country: Canada
- Province: Ontario
- Major cities: Stratford, Kitchener, Cambridge, Hamilton
- Towns: Goderich, Clinton

Highway system
- Ontario provincial highways; Current; Former; 400-series
| ← Highway 7A | → Highway 9 |
Former provincial highways
| ← Highway 7B | Highway 8A → |

King's Highway 8, commonly referred to as Highway 8, is a provincially maintained highway in the Canadian province of Ontario. The 159.7-kilometre (99.2 mi) route travels from Highway 21 in Goderich, on the shores of Lake Huron, to Highway 5 in the outskirts of Hamilton near Lake Ontario. Before the 1970s, it continued east through Hamilton and along the edge of the Niagara Escarpment to the American border at the Whirlpool Bridge in Niagara Falls. However, the Queen Elizabeth Way (QEW) replaced the role of Highway 8 between those two cities, and the highway was subsequently transferred from the province to the newly formed Regional Municipality of Niagara in 1970. In 1998, the remaining portion east of Peters Corners was transferred to the city of Hamilton.

Between Stratford and Kitchener, Highway 8 is concurrent with Highway 7. The two highways widen into a four-lane freeway east of New Hamburg, eventually becoming the Conestoga Parkway within Kitchener, where it splits with Highway 7. It follows a short connector freeway – known as the Freeport Diversion, King Street Bypass, or Highway 8 expressway – south to Highway 401. The route continues as the locally maintained Regional Road 8 (King Street East) through downtown Cambridge before resuming as a provincial highway at Branchton Road and soon after that entering the city of Hamilton. Highway 8 ends east of Peters Corners at an intersection with Hamilton Road 8.

Highway 8 was one of the first roads assumed when the provincial highway system was established, though it was not numbered until 1925. The routes that predate the highway, including the Huron Road, and the Queenston Stone Road, were established during the settlement of Southwestern Ontario between 1780 and 1830. These early trails served as the principal routes in the regions through which they passed and eventually became part of the provincial highway system circa 1918.

== Route description ==
Highways 7 and 8 travel concurrently through downtown Stratford

Highway 8 is a 159.7-kilometre (99.2 mi) route that connects the shores of Lake Huron at Goderich with the head of Lake Ontario in Hamilton. Portions of the highway through Goderich, Clinton, Seaforth, Mitchell and Stratford are locally maintained under a Connecting Link Agreement with the provincial government.

Highway 8 begins at its western terminus in downtown Goderich, at a junction with Highway 21, within Huron County. It exits the town travelling southeast as a rural two-lane highway running roughly parallel and south of the Maitland River, passing through farmland outside of the many small communities it serves. At Holmesville, the river moves northwards while the highway continues southeast, now parallel to and north of the Goderich–Exeter Railway. Soon after, it passes through Clinton, where it intersects the northern terminus of Highway 4. Highway 8 is completely straight for approximately 50 kilometres (31 mi) between Clinton and Stratford. After bisecting Seaforth, the highway enters Perth County and passes through the communities of Dublin, Mitchell (where it intersects Highway 23) and Sebringville.

Entering Stratford as Huron Street, Highway 8 widens to four lanes. It crosses the Avon River, then turns east onto Ontario Street before encountering Highway 7 at Erie Street. The two routes become concurrent for the next 44.5 kilometres (27.7 mi), between Stratford and Kitchener. East of Stratford, the highway narrows back to two lanes and travels north of and parallel to the CN railway Guelph Subdivision. After passing through the village of Shakespeare, the route enters the Regional Municipality of Waterloo as it widens to four lanes and curves onto the New Hamburg Bypass. It travels south of New Hamburg and crosses the Nith River before becoming a divided four-lane freeway near Baden. At Trussler Road, the combined Highway 7/8 enters the city of Kitchener, where it is known as the Conestoga Parkway.

The Freeport Diversion segment of Highway 8 crossing the Grand River, with widening work underway in 2011

The Conestoga Parkway runs through Kitchener, widening to a six-lane freeway near Fischer Hallman Road. At King Street in the city's centre, Highway 8 splits off southeastward at an interchange, while Highway 7 continues along the Conestoga Parkway. Traffic on Highway 8 heading northwest can continue under the Conestoga Parkway onto King Street into downtown Kitchener. Between the Conestoga Parkway and Highway 401, Highway 8 follows an eight-lane freeway known as the Freeport Diversion or Highway 8 Expressway. The expressway initially travels southeast, passing under Franklin Street before swerving slightly south. It crosses over the Grand River at its midpoint, followed by a partial interchange with King Street East that provides access to Highway 401 westbound to London. The expressway narrows to six lanes and later to four lanes at Sportsworld Drive. It merges to eastbound Highway 401 and from westbound 401.

Highway 8 passes farmland near Rockton

The MTO maintains approximately 670 metres (2,198.2 ft) of King Street and Shantz Hill Road at the Highway 401 interchange as an unsigned portion of Highway 8. Within Cambridge, the route continues as Waterloo Regional Road 8 along Shantz Hill Road, Fountain Street, King Street, Coronation Boulevard, and Dundas Street. Highway 8 resumes at Branchton Road, where it exits urban Cambridge into farmland travelling southeast. After approximately 3 kilometres (1.9 mi), the route enters Hamilton. It bypasses the communities of Sheffield and Rockton before eventually reaching Peters Corners, where it meets the western terminus of Highway 5 at a multilane roundabout. Highway 8 ends 200 metres (660 ft) to the east at an intersection with Hamilton Road 8.

== History ==
=== Predecessors (1780–1918) ===
While its history as a provincial highway dates back to 1918, significant portions of the roads that would be taken over by the province and eventually designated as Highway 8 had existed for nearly a century or longer. These include the Huron Road between Berlin (renamed Kitchener in 1916) and Goderich, which was built c. 1827; the Dundas and the Hamilton Stone Road that were established in 1819 along a trail blazed between Hamilton and Berlin in 1798; and the Queenston Road (later the Queenston Stone Road or the Queenston and Grimsby Stone Road), established along an aboriginal trail at the foot of the Niagara Escarpment in the 1780s.

The Queenston Road, circa 1918, before being improved as a provincial highway

When settlers began arriving in the Niagara Peninsula following the American Revolution and the signing of the Treaty of Paris in 1783, natives were non-existent in the area, the local tribe having been ravaged over a century earlier. Trails crisscrossed the peninsula, with the dominant routes favouring an east–west orientation. The most significant of these was the Iroquois Trail that traversed along the foot of the Niagara Escarpment. In the east, Queenston provided an ideal crossing of the Niagara River. In the west, the escarpment breaks at Dundas, where the trail continued towards the Grand River at present-day Brantford, thus providing a portage between Lake Ontario and Lake Erie. The Iroquois Trail was utilised by famous historical figures, including John Graves Simcoe in 1793 on his voyage to Detroit, as well as during the War of 1812. It was widened to accommodate wagon traffic by 1785.

Between approximately 1800 and 1820, large numbers of German and Dutch settlers from Pennsylvania travelled west across the Niagara Peninsula and onward to the Waterloo area. A trail cut from Hamilton to the Grand River, at Galt, in 1798 or 1799, was gradually widened to be fit for wagons by 1819. While Niagara-on-the-Lake served as the initial focal point of settlement into southwestern Ontario, Hamilton emerged in 1816 at the head of Lake Ontario, and immediately became the new hub for settlers. The route between Hamilton and Waterloo was improved to a stone road circa 1836. Over the years the route was known by various names, including the Waterloo Road, the Galt Road, the Old Dutch Road, the Beverly Road, and most often the Dundas and Hamilton Stone Road.

The Huron Road in 1858; note the stumps in the recently cleared farm field

Settlement beyond Waterloo was accomplished by the Canada Company, which acquired the Huron Tract in 1826. In order to implement the grand settlement plan, a trail was surveyed by Mahlon Burwell and William Dunlop from Guelph to Lake Huron at the mouth of the Maitland River beginning in 1827. After company commissioner Thomas Mercer Jones rode the muddy trail from Guelph to Goderich in June 1829, he recommended that it be widened to four rods (20 metres (66 ft)), which was done by the end of that year by Colonel Anthony Van Egmond. The trail was further improved to allow for the passage of wagons by 1832. The Canada Company venture would ultimately fail, but not before establishing the present-day settlement patterns.

=== Designation and paving (1918–1949) ===
Recently-paved Highway 8 between Sebringville and Stratford in 1922

Until 1918, the majority of the primary roads through southern Ontario formed part of the County Road System. The Department of Public Works and Highways paid up to 60% of the construction and maintenance costs for these roads, while the counties were responsible for the remaining 40%. The Ontario government passed an act in 1917 to permit the newly formed Department of Public Highways (DPHO) to take over (or assume) responsibility and upkeep of a provincial highway system. The initial system, between Windsor and Quebec, was bookended by branches to Niagara and Ottawa. The branch to Niagara would become the first provincial highway connection to the United States, and later become the easternmost portion of Highway 8. The Hamilton–Queenston Highway was assumed as part of "The Provincial Highway" in August 1918.

In 1919, the federal government passed the Canada Highways Act, which provided C$20,000,000 to provinces under the condition that they establish an official highway network; up to 40% of construction costs would be subsidized. The first network plan was approved on February 26, 1920, and included the Queenston Road. Most of the remainder of what would become Highway 8 – from Goderich to Hamilton – was assumed by the department throughout July 1920. On October 13, several roads were taken over by the province between St. David's near Queenston and the Whirlpool Rapids Bridge in Niagara Falls. The new route followed the present Four Mile Creek Road, St. Paul Avenue, and Portage Road south to Thorold Stone Road, which it followed east to Stanley Avenue, thence south to Bridge Street. However, none of these roads would receive a route number until the summer of 1925.

Highway 8 south of Cambridge in 1921

Initially Highway 8 was almost entirely unpaved, except within towns and portions between Stratford and Shakespeare as well as between Kitchener and Hamilton. During the initial few years of the existence of the highway network, which were spent rebuilding culverts, bridges, and ditches, paving took a low priority. The first sections of Highway 8 paved by the DPHO were in 1922 between Hamilton and Stoney Creek, as well as between Sebringville and Stratford. The rest of the highway between Hamilton and Niagara Falls, as well as the remaining gaps between Kitchener and Hamilton, were paved the following year. Work was completed between Shakespeare and New Hamburg, as well as on the gaps between Petersburg and Kitchener in 1924. In 1925, paving between Mitchell and Sebringville was completed. At this time, Highway 8 was paved from Mitchell to New Hamburg, and from Petersburg to Niagara Falls. In 1926, paving was completed for 10 kilometres (6 mi) southeast of Goderich, as well as between Dublin and Mitchell. The following year, it was completed on the remaining gap between Goderich and Clinton, as well as between Seaforth and Dublin. The final unpaved section of Highway 8, between Clinton and Seaforth, was completed in 1928.

=== Bypasses and the Conestoga Parkway (1949–1970) ===
Construction in 2011 to widen the Highway 8 expressway to eight lanes, shown at the King Street East interchange, with the Grand River crossing in the background

Highway 8 would remain unchanged for approximately 20 years until bypasses of several cities and towns along the route were built. The first such bypass was in Kitchener, where until 1949, the highway travelled into and out of the downtown core along King Street and Queen Street before following Highland Road west towards Stratford. By 1950, to divert truck traffic from the King and Queen Street intersection, it was redirected slightly along Ottawa Street and Courtland Avenue. The New Hamburg Diversion opened in 1957, bypassing its namesake as well as the community of Baden. The original route – following Huron Street, Waterloo Street, and Snyder's Street West – met the new bypass at Gingerich Road east of Baden. Farther east, two bypasses were constructed around the villages of Rockton and Sheffield beginning in 1958 that opened the following year.

Within Hamilton, growing congestion in the 1950s led the city to hire American traffic engineer Wilbur Smith, who had made a business of consulting for cities to develop one-way street plans. Smith proposed a complete reorganisation of the downtown area, including converting Main Street – which Highway 8 followed through the city – to an eastbound one-way. King Street served the opposing direction in the one-way pairing. The switch from two-way to one-way traffic took place on October 28, 1956. It immediately drew condemnation from local businesses, which saw a significant reduction in customers. A special council meeting to discuss the matter was held on July 15, 1957, which drew a large public audience. At it, alderman Ramsey Evans, a member of the committee that had first suggested the one-way conversion, sought to undo it. The motion was defeated, and Main Street and King Street remain one-way streets.

In the fall of 1961, the Department of Highways began construction of the Freeport Diversion, providing a new divided highway crossing of the Grand River. The diversion, connecting with King Street south of the Grand River and at Fergus Street, was completed in 1963. Although the concept of a ring road around Kitchener and Waterloo originated from the Kitchener-Waterloo and Suburban Planning Board in 1948, actual consideration was not given to it until it was recommended by a 1961 traffic study. By then, the opening of Highway 401 was attracting business away from the rapidly growing twin cities. Land was gradually purchased over the intervening years and picked up considerably when plans for the expressway system were first raised in late 1962. The provincial government reached a funding arrangement with Kitchener and Waterloo to cover 75% of the expected C$22 million cost, and officially announced the Kitchener–Waterloo Expressway on May 21, 1964. The province eventually took over authority for the entire project in August 1965.

Interchange between Conestoga Parkway and Freeport Diversion after its 2004 reconstruction, facing south and showing both legs of Highway 8

Construction of the Kitchener–Waterloo Expressway began in February 1966 with the awarding of a C$3 million contract to rebuild 2.7 kilometres (1.7 mi) of King Street into a four lane divided highway from Fairway Road (renamed from Block Line Road) to Doon Road, including the half cloverleaf interchange that would serve the western and northern legs of the expressway system. In the mid-to-late 1960s, Highway 8 was redirected along Fairway Road, Mill Street (now Vanier Drive) and a new road named Henry Sturm Boulevard that travelled east from Ottawa Street and Highland Road to Mill Street. The expressway was renamed the Conestoga Parkway in January 1967, after being chosen by a joint committee from a shortlist of 12 publicly submitted names. The reconstruction of King Street was completed and opened in November 1967. Construction began several months later in October on a C$3.6 million contract to build a 2.9-kilometre (1.8 mi) segment of the parkway from King Street to west of Homer Watson Boulevard. This section, which was built along the alignment of Henry Strum Boulevard, was opened to traffic between Courtland Avenue and King Street on November 25, 1968, at which point the Highway 8 designation was redirected along King Street and the Conestoga Parkway to Homer Watson Boulevard, via Henry Strum Boulevard, and onto Highland Road.

=== Transfers and expressway extensions (1970–1997) ===
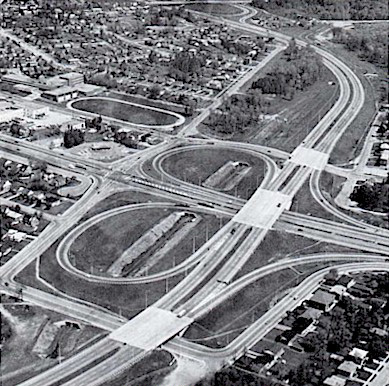
Interchange between Conestoga Parkway and Freeport Diversion in 1970, shortly after opening

During the 1960s, the Department of Highways undertook several regional transportation studies to determine traffic patterns, which had changed significantly since the highway network was established in the 1920s. Among these was the Niagara Peninsula Planning Study, released in 1964. It indicated that several highways were no longer provincially significant, and responsibility for them should be transferred to local government. Having largely been supplanted by the Queen Elizabeth Way, opened in the 1940s, the winding route of Highway 8 east of Winona was transferred to the new Regional Municipality of Niagara on September 1, 1970. The region designated the former highway as Regional Road 81.

Meanwhile, work continued on the Conestoga Parkway in the early 1970s, with a section between Courtland Avenue and Fischer-Hallman Drive opening on September 1, 1971. Around this time, construction was underway on a new two lane alignment of Highway 7/8, first announced in 1963, to connect the New Hamburg Diversion with the Conestoga Parkway. It opened on August 13, 1973, bypassing Baden; the former alignment east of New Hamburg is now known as Gingerich Road.

During the mid-1970s, proposals for a Highway 8 bypass of Cambridge were floated, but never gained traction. Although the proposal was shelved in 1988, the bypass idea was briefly revived as a result of recommendations in the Cambridge Area Transportation Study, released in June 1992. It recommended construction of a C$54.5 million bypass of Highway 8 around the west side of Cambridge, from Highway 401 to south of the city. The proposal faced public backlash due to the cost as well as environmental concerns of crossing the Grand River and five environmentally sensitive areas.

Interchange between Highway 8 (Freeport Diversion) and King Street East facing southeast towards Highway 401 in the distance

Following the completion of an environmental assessment in 1984, construction began by 1985 on a new 3.3-kilometre (2.1 mi) freeway link between the Freeport Diversion and Highway 401, which was known as Highway 8 New during construction. Highway 8 New was completed by 1988, and received the non-public designation Highway 7187, since the Highway 8 designation continued along King Street East and Shantz Hill Road towards Cambridge. However, in 2008, Highway 8 was rerouted along the 3.3-kilometre (2.1 mi) freeway segment, while King Street East and Shantz Hill Road were re-designated as Waterloo Regional Road 8. The province continues to maintain approximately 670 metres (2,198.2 ft) of Waterloo Regional Road 8 at the Highway 401 interchange as an unsigned portion of Highway. 8.

The two lane segment of Highway 7/8 from Fischer-Hallman Road west to Baden was originally slated to be twinned to four lanes in the 1980s, but the project was put off for a decade. Early works tree clearing got underway in 1991 before the project was put on hold for archeological excavations. Construction began to widen the route as far west as Waterloo Regional Road 12 (Queen Street), south of Petersburg, on July 6, 1992, with a planned completion by August 1993.

Budget constraints brought on by a recession in the 1990s resulted in the Mike Harris provincial government forming the Who Does What? committee to determine cost-cutting measures in order to balance the budget after a deficit incurred by former premier Bob Rae. It was determined that many Ontario highways no longer served long-distance traffic movement and should therefore be maintained by local or regional levels of government. The MTO consequently transferred many highways to lower levels of government in 1997 and 1998, which resulted in the removal of a significant percentage of the provincial highway network. As a result of this, the portion of Highway 8 east of Highway 5 at Peters Corners, through Dundas, Hamilton and Stoney Creek, was transferred to the Regional Municipality of Hamilton–Wentworth on April 1, 1997. A 2.3-kilometre (1.4 mi) section of King Street in Kitchener, from north of the Highway 401 interchange to the Freeport Diversion, was also transferred on that day to the Regional Municipality of Waterloo.

Facing east overlooking the two interchanges between Highway 8 and Highway 401. The nearer King Street interchange serves traffic to and from the west on Highway 401, while the farther Freeport Diversion interchange serves traffic to and from the east exclusively.

=== Since 1997 ===
In the early 1990s, the provincial government announced plans to widen the Conestoga Parkway and Freeport Diversion, as well as to improve the interchange between the two. The project was broken into several phases, and included rebuilding the Ottawa Street and Franklin Street overpasses. Construction began in August or September 1998 to widen the Conestoga Parkway from four to six lanes between Courtland Avenue and King Street. It was completed, along with widening of the parkway between King Street and Frederick Street, in July 2000. The expansion of Highway 8 from four lanes to eight lanes between the Conestoga Parkway and Fergus Avenue was originally scheduled to begin in 2001, but was delayed as businesses along Weber Street fought expropriation. Construction instead began in April 2002, which involved shifting one of the retaining walls further north and a new Franklin Street bridge to accommodate the eight lane cross-section freeway. Included with this project was a reconstruction of the bottle-necked interchange of the Conestoga Parkway and Highway 8, including a new flyover ramp from westbound Conestoga Parkway to eastbound Highway 8 to replace one of the two loop ramps, and realignment of the northbound to eastbound ramp. Both were completed and opened on June 11, 2004.

Work began on the next phase, widening Highway 8 from four to eight lanes from Fergus Avenue to northwest of the Grand River, in April 2006. This work included rebuilding the Fairway Road interchange. Construction to twin Highway 8 over the Grand River and widen it northwest of the Sportsworld Drive interchange began in the summer of 2009, following the relocation of approximately 50 Wavy-rayed lampmussel, considered a species at risk in Canada. Both projects were completed and opened, except for one westbound lane over the Grand River, in November 2011; the fourth westbound lane was opened the following year.

An operational and safety review of the three intersections at Peters Corners near Hamilton was undertaken in February 2001. Studies, including an environmental assessment were conducted between 2004 and 2009, and settled upon a roundabout as the ideal replacement, with traffic signals at the two intersections with Westover Road. Construction began in the spring of 2012, and the C$6.3 million roundabout was opened on September 25, 2012.

== Future ==
The interchange between the Freeport Diversion and Highway 401 is incomplete, providing access only between eastbound Highway 8 and eastbound Highway 401, and between westbound Highway 401 and westbound Highway 8. Although a detailed design for two additional ramps to provide access to and from the west to Highway 8 was prepared in 2010, there is no schedule or funding as of 2021 for this work.

== Major intersections ==
The following table lists the major junctions along Highway 8, as noted by the Ministry of Transportation of Ontario. Highway 8 is maintained under a Connecting Link agreement within Goderich, Clinton, Seaforth, Mitchell, and Stratford.

| Division | Location | km | mi | Destinations | Notes |
|---|---|---|---|---|---|
| Huron | Goderich | 0.0 | 0.0 | Highway 21 (Victoria Street) – Sarnia, Owen Sound | Highway 8 western terminus; beginning of Goderich Connecting Link agreement |
| Huron | Goderich | 2.1 | 1.3 | | End of Goderich Connecting Link agreement |
| Huron | Central Huron | 6.8 | 4.2 | County Road 1 north (Benmiller Line) | |
| Huron | Central Huron | 13.9 | 8.6 | County Road 18 west (Cut Line Road); County Road 31 (Shapes Creek Line / Cut Line Road) | Holmesville |
| Huron | Central Huron (Clinton) | 18.7 | 11.6 | | Beginning of Clinton Connecting Link agreement |
| Huron | Central Huron (Clinton) | 19.9 | 12.4 | Highway 4 south (Victoria Street) – London; County Road 4 north (Albert Street) | |
| Huron | Central Huron (Clinton) | 20.8 | 12.9 | | End of Clinton Connecting Link agreement |
| Huron | Central Huron | 28.4 | 17.6 | County Road 15 (Kinburn Line) | |
| Huron | Huron East | 32.3– 33.7 | 20.1– 20.9 | | Seaforth Connecting Link agreement |
| Huron–Perth boundary | Huron East–West Perth boundary | 43.5 | 27.0 | Huron County Road 14 north / Perth County Road 180 | Dublin; Huron County Road 14 / Perth County Road 180 concurrency north of Highway 8 |
| Perth | West Perth (Mitchell) | 49.9 | 31.0 | | Beginning of Mitchell Connecting Link agreement |
| Perth | West Perth (Mitchell) | 51.5 | 32.0 | Highway 23 south – London | Western end of Highway 23 concurrency |
| Perth | West Perth (Mitchell) | 51.7 | 32.1 | Highway 23 north – Listowel | Eastern end of Highway 23 concurrency |
| Perth | West Perth (Mitchell) | 52.7 | 32.7 | | End of Mitchell Connecting Link agreement |
| Perth | Perth South–Perth East boundary | 63.9 | 39.7 | County Road 135 north | Sebringville |
| Perth | Perth South–Perth East boundary | 65.9 | 40.9 | County Road 130 south | Sebringville |
| Stratford | | 69.6 | 43.2 | | Beginning of Stratford Connecting Link agreement |
| Stratford | | 73.3 | 45.5 | County Road 122 north (O'Loane Avenue) | |
| Stratford | | 75.4 | 46.9 | Highway 7 west (Erie Street) – London | Western end of Highway 7 concurrency; western end of former Highway 19 concurrency |
| Stratford | | 75.6 | 47.0 | Waterloo Street | Formerly Highway 19 north; eastern end of former Highway 19 concurrency; to County Road 119 north |
| Stratford | | 78.4 | 48.7 | | End of Stratford Connecting Link |
| Perth | Perth East | 87.1 | 54.1 | County Road 107 | Shakespeare; formerly Highway 59 |
| Perth–Waterloo boundary | Perth East–Wilmot boundary | 95.2 | 59.2 | Regional Road 1 (Wilmot–Easthope Road) | New Hamburg Bypass |
| Waterloo | Wilmot | 97.4 | 60.5 | Regional Road 3 south (Walker Road) | New Hamburg Bypass |
| Waterloo | Wilmot | 98.4 | 61.1 | Regional Road 4 west (Peel Street) | New Hamburg Bypass |
| Waterloo | Wilmot | 99.2 | 61.6 | Regional Road 4 east (Bleams Road) | |
| Waterloo | Wilmot | 100.7 | 62.6 | Regional Road 5 north (Nafziger Road) | |
| Waterloo | Wilmot | 102.1 | 63.4 | Controlled-access highway begins | |
| Waterloo | Wilmot | 102.9 | 63.9 | Regional Road 51 (Foundry Street) – Wilmot Centre | |
| Waterloo | Wilmot | 107.7 | 66.9 | Regional Road 12 (Queen Street (south) / Notre Dame Drive (north)) – Petersburg | |
| Waterloo | Kitchener | 111.6 | 69.3 | Regional Road 70 (Trussler Road) – Mannheim | Kitchener city limits; becomes Conestoga Parkway |
| Waterloo | Kitchener | 114.5 | 71.1 | Regional Road 58 (Fischer Hallman Road) | |
| Waterloo | Kitchener | 117.1 | 72.8 | Regional Road 28 (Homer Watson Boulevard) | Eastbound entrance via Ottawa Street South |
| Waterloo | Kitchener | 118.4 | 73.6 | Regional Road 53 (Courtland Avenue) | |
| Waterloo | Kitchener | 119.8 | 74.4 | Highway 7 east (Conestoga Parkway) – Waterloo, Guelph | Highway 8 exits Conestoga Parkway onto Freeport Diversion; eastern end of Highway 7 concurrency |
| Waterloo | Kitchener | 119.8 | 74.4 | Regional Road 15 north (King Street East) | Westbound exit and eastbound entrance; no connection to Conestoga Parkway |
| Waterloo | Kitchener | 122.0 | 75.8 | Regional Road 53 (Fairway Road), Weber Street | |
| Waterloo | Kitchener | 124.5 | 77.4 | Regional Road 8 (King Street) to Highway 401 west – Cambridge, London | Eastbound exit and westbound entrance; former route of Highway 8 |
| Waterloo | Kitchener | 128.4 | 79.8 | Regional Road 38 (Sportsworld Drive, Maple Grove Road) | |
| Waterloo | Kitchener | 130.5 | 81.1 | Highway 401 east | Eastbound exit and westbound entrance; Highway 401 exit 278 |
| Waterloo | Kitchener | Former alignment via Waterloo Regional Road 8 | | | |
| Waterloo | Kitchener | 124.5 | 77.4 | Regional Road 8 (King Street) Freeport Diversion to Highway 401 east | Eastbound exit and westbound entrance; continuation from Highway 8 west; Highway 8 formerly exited Freeport Diversion and followed King Street (present-day Regional Road 8 east) |
| Waterloo | Kitchener–Cambridge boundary | 127.1 | 79.0 | Highway 401 – Toronto, London | Highway 401 exit 278 |
| Waterloo | Cambridge | 133.4 | 82.9 | Regional Road 24 (Hespeler Road, Water Street N) | Formerly Highway 24 |
| Waterloo | Cambridge | 136.2 | 84.6 | Regional Road 97 (Main Street) | Formerly Highway 97 |
| Waterloo | Cambridge | 141.5 | 87.9 | Highway 8 resumes Waterloo Regional Road 8 ends Regional Road 43 south (Branchton Road) | Highway 8 resumes |
| Hamilton | | 153.3 | 95.3 | City Road 52 north (Kirkwall Road) – Kirkwall | Rockton; former Highway 52 north; western end of former Highway 52 concurrency |
| Hamilton | | 159.5 | 99.1 | City Road 52 south – Copetown Highway 5 begins City Road 5 west – Paris | Peters Corners; formerly Highway 52 south; eastern end of former Highway 52 concurrency; western end of Highway 5 concurrency |
| Hamilton | | 159.7 | 99.2 | Highway 5 east – Burlington Highway 8 ends Hamilton City Road 8 begins | Highway 8 eastern terminus; eastern end of Highway 5 concurrency; continues as City Road 8 |
| Hamilton | | 170.5 | 105.9 | City Road 99 west (Dundas Street) | Dundas; formerly Highway 99 west |
| Hamilton | | 173.1 | 107.6 | Main Street West | Formerly Highway 2 west; former western end of Highway 2 concurrency; Highway 8 followed Main Street |
| Hamilton | | 174.4– 175.7 | 108.4– 109.2 | Highway 403 – Toronto, Brantford | Highway 403 exits 69 & 70; one-way transition where eastbound follows Main Street and westbound follows King Street; present-day Highway 403 / Highway 6 concurrency |
| Hamilton | | 175.9 | 109.3 | Dundurn Street | Formerly Highway 2 east / Highway 6 north; former eastern end of Highway 2 concurrency; former western end of Highway 6 concurrency |
| Hamilton | | 178.4– 178.6 | 110.9– 111.0 | Wellington Street / Victoria Avenue | One-way pair; formerly Highway 6 south; former eastern end of Highway 6 concurrency |
| Hamilton | | 181.5 | 112.8 | King Street East / Kensington Avenue | One-way transition; former Highway 8 continued on Main Street East |
| Hamilton | | 186.7 | 116.0 | City Road 20 (Centennial Parkway) | Formerly Highway 20 |
| Hamilton–Niagara boundary | Hamilton–Grimsby boundary | 198.0 | 123.0 | Hamilton City Road 8 ends Niagara Regional Road 81 begins | Former Highway 8 eastern terminus (1970–1997) |
| Niagara | St. Catharines | 232.3 | 144.3 | Highway 406 | Highway 406 exit 6; access via Regional Road 46 (Geneva Street) or Regional Road 91 (Westchester Avenue) |
| Niagara | Welland Canal | 237.6 | 147.6 | Homer Lift Bridge | |
| Niagara | Niagara-on-the-Lake | 238.2 | 148.0 | Regional Road 55 north – Niagara-on-the-Lake | Formerly Highway 55 north |
| Niagara | Niagara-on-the-Lake | 240.4 | 149.4 | Queen Elizabeth Way – Toronto, Niagara Falls | QEW exit 38; access via Regional Road 89 (Glendale Avenue) |
| Niagara | Niagara-on-the-Lake | 245.5 | 152.5 | Regional Road 81 east (York Road) Regional Road 100 north (4 Mile Creek Road) | St. David's; formerly Highway 8A east; former Highway 8 follows present-day Regional Road 100 south |
| Niagara | Niagara-on-the-Lake–Niagara Falls boundary | 246.9 | 153.4 | Highway 405 | Former Highway 8 eastern terminus (1968–1970); access via Regional Road 61 (Townline Road) |
| Niagara | Niagara Falls | 248.1 | 154.2 | Regional Road 100 ends Regional Road 101 (Mountain Road) | St. Paul Avenue continues south |
| Niagara | Niagara Falls | 250.4 | 155.6 | Regional Road 57 (Thorold Stone Road) | Former Highway 8 follows present-day Regional Road 57 east (Thorold Stone Road) |
| Niagara | Niagara Falls | 251.5 | 156.3 | Regional Road 102 (Stanley Avenue) | Former Highway 8 followed present-day Regional Road 102 south (Stanley Avenue) |
| Niagara | Niagara Falls | 251.5 | 156.3 | Regional Road 43 east (Bridge Street) | Former Highway 8 followed present-day Regional Road 43 east (Bridge Street) |
| Niagara River | | 254.6 | 158.2 | Whirlpool Rapids Bridge | |
1.000 mi = 1.609 km; 1.000 km = 0.621 mi: Closed/former; Concurrency terminus; Incomplete access; Route transition

== See also ==
- Royal eponyms in Canada
