= Maitland River =

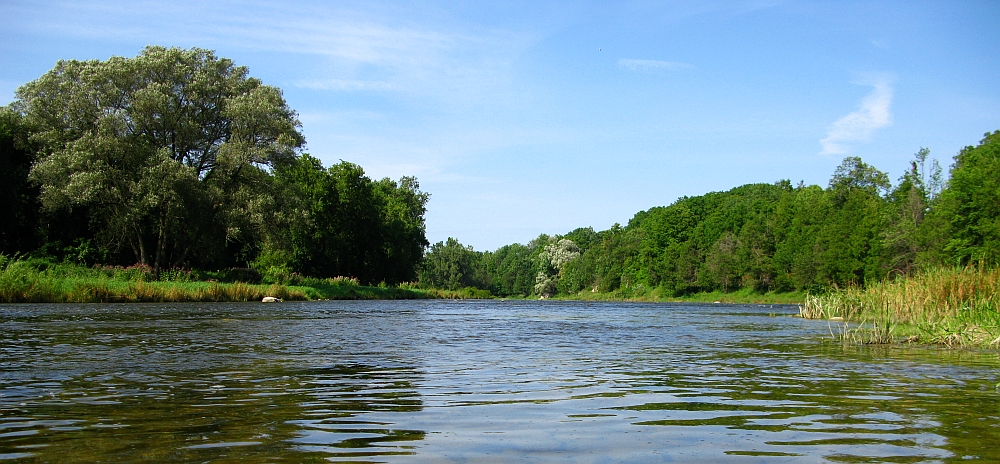
- Maitland River west of Auburn, Ontario
- Etymology: Named after Sir Peregrine Maitland

Location
- Country: Canada
- Province: Ontario
- Region: Southwestern Ontario
- Counties: Huron; Wellington; Perth

Physical characteristics
- Source
  - location: Wellington North, Wellington County
  - coordinates: 43°54′58″N 80°39′22″W
  - elevation: 447 m (1,467 ft)
- Mouth: Lake Huron
  - location: Goderich, Huron County
  - coordinates: 43°44′55″N 81°43′38″W
  - elevation: 176 m (577 ft)
- Length: 150 km (93 mi)
- Basin size: 2,592 km^{2} (1,001 sq mi)

Basin features
- River system: Great Lakes Basin
- Tributaries
  - left: South Maitland River, Middle Maitland River

The Maitland River is a river in Huron County, Perth County and Wellington County in Southwestern Ontario, Canada. The river is in the Great Lakes Basin and empties into Lake Huron at the town of Goderich. It is 150 kilometres (93 mi) long, and is named after Sir Peregrine Maitland, Lieutenant-Governor of Upper Canada from 1818 to 1828. It was formerly known as the Menesetung River.

== Course ==
The river begins in geographic Arthur Township in the municipality of Wellington North, Wellington County. It flows west into the municipality of Minto and its main centre, the community of Harriston, with its triple junction of Ontario Highway 9, Ontario Highway 23 and Ontario Highway 89. The river continues west into the municipality of Howick, Huron County, where it passes over two small dams, at Gorrie (maintained by the Maitland Valley Conservation Authority) and at Wroxeter (maintained by the community), passes through the municipality of Morris-Turnberry, and reaches the community of Wingham in the municipality of North Huron, where it passes over a dam and takes in the left tributary Middle Maitland River. The river then turns southwest and enters the municipality of Ashfield–Colborne–Wawanosh. From the community of Auburn to Goderich, the river forms the boundary between Ashfield–Colborne–Wawanosh and the municipality of Central Huron. The river continues southwest, takes in the left tributary South Maitland River, turns northwest, and reaches its mouth at Lake Huron at the town of Goderich.

== Natural history ==
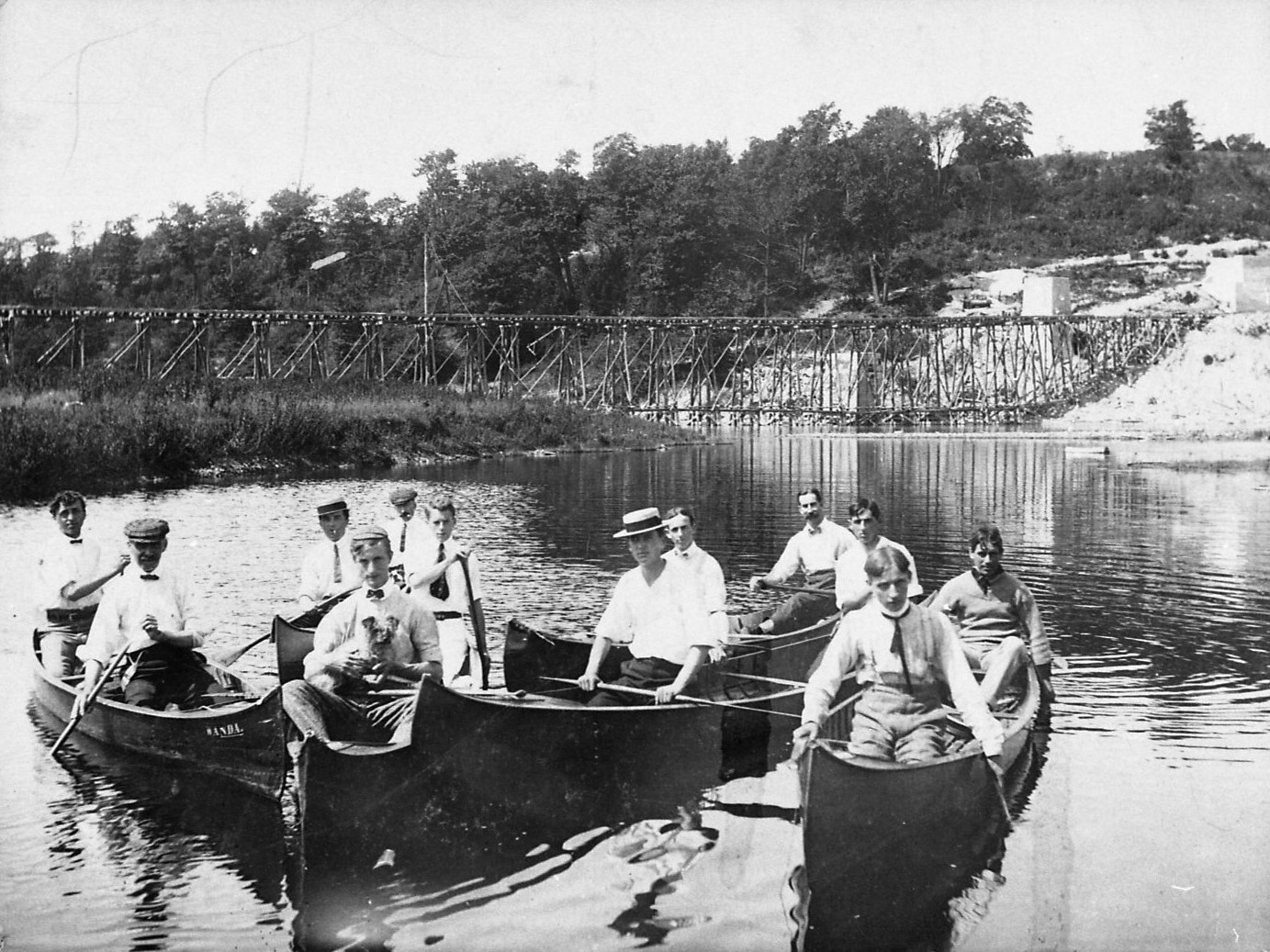
Canoeing on the Maitland River, 1906

The lower Maitland (to Wingham) has a trout and salmon run, and is home to several species at risk including queen snake, wavy-rayed lampmussel and butternut tree, as well as several Carolinian forest species, including bitternut hickory, American sycamore, summer grape and green dragon.

== Tributaries ==
- Cemetery Creek (left)
- Sharpes Creek (right)
- Hopkins Creek (left)
- South Maitland River (left)
- Blyth Brook (left)
- Belgrave Creek (left)
- Middle Maitland River (left)
- Little Maitland River
- Lakelet Creek (right)
- Salem Creek (right)

== See also ==
- List of rivers of Ontario

== Sources ==
- Map 2 (PDF) (Map). 1 : 700,000. Official road map of Ontario. Ministry of Transportation of Ontario. 2012-01-01.
- Map 4 (PDF) (Map). 1 : 700,000. Official road map of Ontario. Ministry of Transportation of Ontario. 2012-01-01.
- Restructured municipalities - Ontario map #6 (Map). Restructuring Maps of Ontario. Ontario Ministry of Municipal Affairs and Housing. 2006. Archived from the original on 2021-02-24.
- MVCA Watersheds (PDF) (Map). Maitland Valley Conservation Authority. 2010.
