= Ontario Highway 9 =

Ontario provincial highway

Highway 9

Route information
- Maintained by Ministry of Transportation of Ontario
- Length: 119.0 km (73.9 mi)
- Existed: February 26, 1920–present

Western segment
- West end: Highway 21 – Kincardine
- East end: Highway 23 / Highway 89 – Harriston

Eastern segment
- West end: Highway 10 – Orangeville
- East end: Highway 400 (near Newmarket)

Location
- Country: Canada
- Province: Ontario
- Towns: Kincardine, Walkerton, Mildmay, Clifford, Harriston, Orangeville, Mono Mills

Highway system
- Ontario provincial highways; Current; Former; 400-series
← Highway 8	→ Highway 10

King's Highway 9, commonly referred to as Highway 9, is a provincially maintained highway in the Canadian province of Ontario. Highway 9 has been divided into two segments since January 1, 1998, when the segment between Harriston and Orangeville was downloaded to the various counties in which it resided. The western segment of the highway begins at Highway 21 in Kincardine, near the shores of Lake Huron. It travels 73 km (45 mi) to the junction of Highway 23 and Highway 89 in Harriston. The central segment is now known as Wellington County Road 109 and Dufferin County Road 109. At Highway 10 in Orangeville, Highway 9 resumes and travels east to Highway 400. The highway once continued east to Yonge Street in Newmarket, but is now known as York Regional Road 31.

Highway 9 was first assumed into the provincial highway system on February 26, 1920 as the Arthur–Kincardine Road. It was extended to Cookstown in the early 1930s via Orangeville and Shelburne, creating a short lived concurrency with Highway 10. In 1937, the road between Orangeville and Schomberg was designated part of Highway 9. The concurrency was discontinued, and the remainder became Highway 89. In 1965, Highway 9 was extended to Newmarket along Davis Drive.

== Route description ==
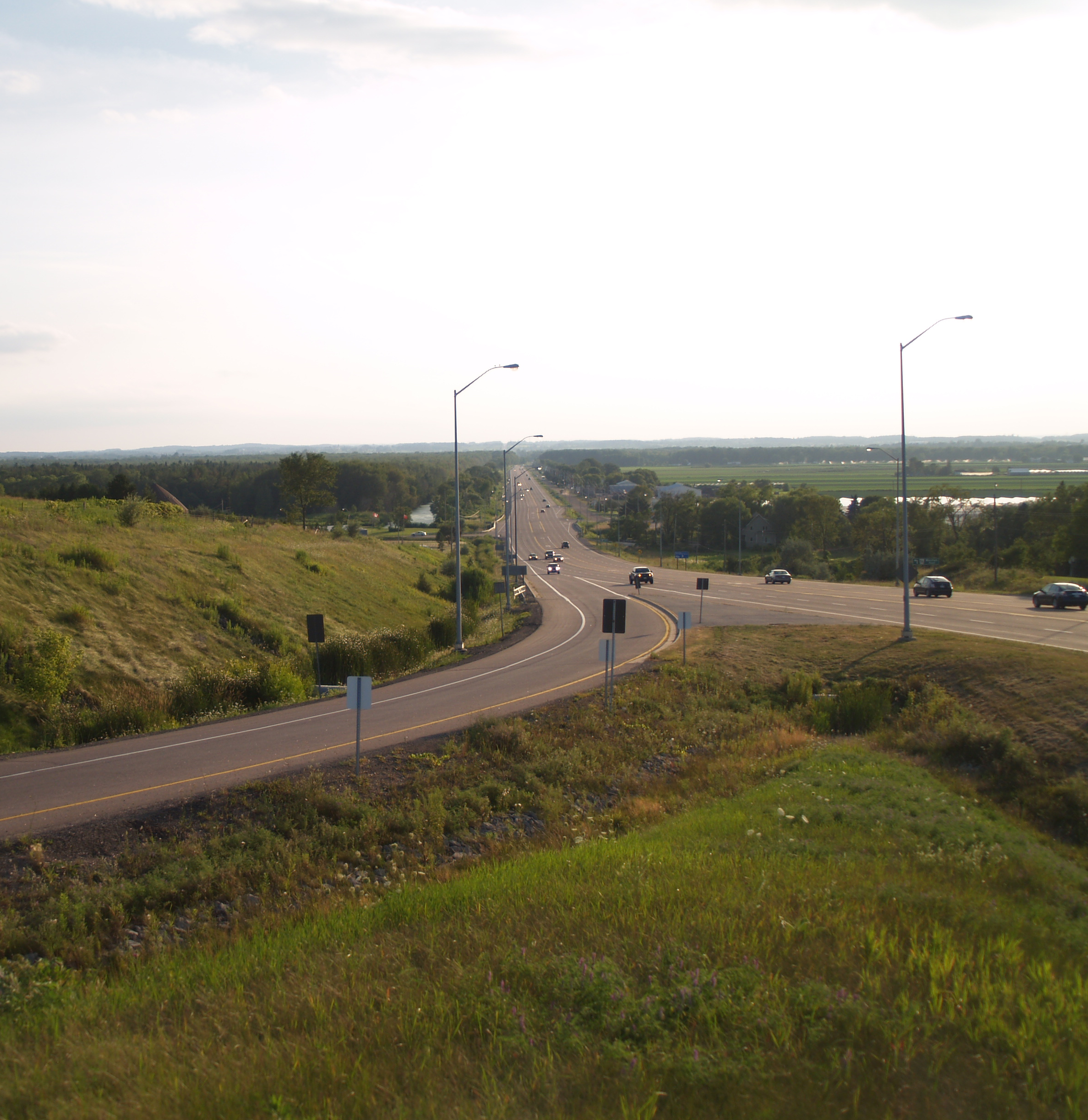
Highway 9 looking west from Highway 400 over the Holland Marsh

Highway 9 begins at the edge of Kincardine near the eastern shoreline of Lake Huron. The roadway continues west past Highway 21 to the lake as Broadway Street. To the east of Highway 21, the highway travels along a concession road for 40 km (25 mi), through the Saugeen Conservation Lands to the town of Walkerton. Within Walkerton, Highway 9 turns south at a junction with Bruce County Road 4. It travels south to the village of Mildmay, where it curves to the south-east. The highway continues in this direction through the villages of Clifford and Harriston, forming the centre of a thin band of farmland oriented at a 45-degree angle to the surrounding land. In the centre of Harriston, Highway 9 ends at a four way junction. Highway 89 travels north-east from this location, while Highway 23 travels south-west. Highway 9 formerly continued south-east, but is now known as Wellington County Road 109 past this junction.

At Highway 10 in Orangeville, Highway 9 resumes and travels east to Highway 400, crossing the Niagara Escarpment along the way. Highway 9 acts as a dividing line between several municipalities and counties, and also divides the different survey grids. Highway 9 is mostly two lanes wide in this section; however, there are frequent passing zones, and the highway usually widens up to 4 lanes at major junctions, such as Airport Road in Mono Mills, Highway 50, and Highway 27. From Canal Road to the transition to York Regional Road 31, Highway 9 widens to 4 lanes. The highway once continued east to Yonge Street in Newmarket, but this section is known as York Regional Road 31. Highway 9 ends at an interchange with Highway 400. A commuter parking lot is provided for carpooling.

== History ==
The portion of Highway 9 between Kincardine and the junction with Yonge Street in Walkerton was built originally as the Durham Settlement Road or Durham Road for short. The Durham Road was surveyed and constructed between 1849 and 1851. It extended from the border between present-day Grey Highlands, Grey County and Clearview, Simcoe County, south of Singhampton, through Flesherton (on the then Toronto–Sydenham Settlement Road, today Highway 10), Durham (on the Garafraxa Settlement Road, today Highway 6, and one reason the road took its name), Hanover and Walkerton to Kincardine. The western section from Kincardine to Walkerton is today Highway 9, and the other sections to the east were at one point part of Highway 4, and today Bruce County Road 4 and Grey County Road 4.

On February 26, 1920, the Arthur–Kincardine Road was designated as a provincial highway. It connected what would become Highway 6 with Kincardine, on the shores of Lake Huron. In August 1925, the road was numbered as Highway 9, alongside the other existing provincial highways. The route was extended to Cookstown in the early 1930s. The road between Arthur and Orangeville was assumed as part of Highway 9 on March 12, 1930; the road between Shelburne and Cookstown was assumed on May 27, 1931. The two roads were connected by creating a concurrency along Highway 10. On February 10, 1937, the road between Orangeville and Schomberg was designated part of Highway 9. To alleviate the forked path of the highway, the concurrency with Highway 10 was discontinued and the road between Shelburne and Cookstown was renumbered as Highway 89. By October 1963, Davis Drive was built west of Newmarket, across the Holland Marsh to Schomberg. On July 23, 1965, Highway 9 was extended to Newmarket along Davis Drive, bringing its total length to 191.7 km (119.1 mi).

A long-standing issue through most of the history of Highway 9 is the Orangeville Bypass, the proposal for a route for trucks and other through traffic to bypass the central business district of Orangeville. In the 1960s, the Highway 10 bypass was constructed. At the same time, Highway 9 was rerouted from its straight route to meet the new bypass, creating Buena Vista Drive as a result. Starting in 1978, numerous plans were formulated for a southern bypass of Broadway, none of which came to fruition. Orangeville eventually resorted to constructing the road themselves, completing several kilometres before local Member of Provincial Parliament and premier Ernie Eves contributed C$7 million of provincial funding to the project. The 6.8 km (4.2 mi) bypass was finally opened to traffic on August 3, 2005.

On January 1, 1998, the province transferred sections of Highway 9 between Harriston and Orangeville to Dufferin County and Wellington County, creating a 67.7 km (42.1 mi) gap between sections of the highway. This transfer has been widely contested since it took place, often used as an example for the hastily executed highway transfers in Ontario. On September 1, 1999, the Regional Municipality of York assumed responsibility for the section of Highway 9 between Highway 400 and Yonge Street, by redesignating it as Regional Road 31, and naming it as a westerly extension of Davis Drive.

== Major intersections ==
The following table lists the major junctions along Highway 9, as noted by the Ministry of Transportation of Ontario.

Division	Location	km	mi	Destinations	Notes
Bruce	Kincardine	0.0	0.0	Highway 21 – Port Elgin, Goderich	Highway 9 western terminus
Bruce	Kincardine	8.2	5.1	County Road 7 south	
Bruce	Huron-Kinloss	18.0	11.2	County Road 1	Kinloss
Bruce	Brockton	26.6	16.5	County Road 4 south County Road 20 north	Formerly Highway 4 south; former western end of Highway 4 concurrency
Bruce	Brockton	33.8	21.0	County Road 12 south	
Bruce	Brockton	35.9	22.3	County Road 3	
Bruce	South Bruce	40.0	24.9	County Road 4 north (Yonge Street)	Walkerton; formerly Highway 4 north; former western end of Highway 4 concurrency
Bruce	South Bruce	48.3	30.0	County Road 3 north	Mildmay
Bruce	South Bruce	48.7	30.3	County Road 28 (Absalom Street)	Mildmay
Huron	No major junctions				
Huron–Wellington boundary	Howick–Minto boundary	61.3	38.1	Huron County Road 35 / Wellington County Road 1 (West Heritage Street / Howick–Minto Line)	To Grey County Road 10
Wellington	Minto	62.8	39.0	County Road 2 west (Allan Street East)	Clifford
Wellington	Minto	63.0	39.1	County Road 2 east (Mill Street East)	Clifford
Wellington	Minto	72.8	45.2	Highway 23 south – Listowel; Highway 89 east – Mount Forest Wellington County Road 109 begins	Harriston; end of western segment; former Highway 87 west / Highway 89 west; continues as County Road 109
Wellington–Perth boundary	Minto–Mapleton–North Perth boundary	84.8	52.7	Wellington County Road 123 west / Perth County Line 93 west – Palmerston; Wellington County Road 7 south – Elora; To Wellington County Road 9 south / Perth County Road 140 south	Teviotdale; formerly Highway 23 south via present-day Wellington County Road 123 / Perth County Line 93
Wellington	Wellington North	103.2	64.1	Highway 6 – Owen Sound, Guelph	Arthur
Wellington–Dufferin boundary	Wellington North–Grand Valley boundary	114.3– 115.1	71.0– 71.5	Wellington County Road 109 ends Dufferin County Road 109 begins	Wellington County Road 109 / Dufferin County Road 109 concurrency for 0.8 km (0.5 mi)
Dufferin	Grand Valley–East Garafraxa boundary	121.7	75.6	County Road 25 north – Grand Valley	Formerly Highway 25 north; former western end of Highway 25 concurrency
Dufferin	Amaranth–East Garafraxa boundary	124.6	77.4	County Road 24 south	Formerly Highway 25 south; former eastern end of Highway 25 concurrency
Dufferin	Orangeville	136.0	84.5	County Road 109 east (Reiddell Road / Orangeville Bypass)	County Road 109 follows Reiddell Road / Orangeville Bypass; former Highway 9 continues on Broadway
Dufferin	Orangeville	136.0	84.5	John Street	Formerly Highway 136 south; to Regional Road 136 south
Dufferin–Peel boundary	Orangeville–Caledon boundary	140.7	87.4	Highway 10 north – Shelburne, Owen Sound	Formerly eastern end of Highway 10 / Highway 24 concurrency
Dufferin–Peel boundary	Orangeville–Caledon boundary	141.2	87.7	Highway 10 south – Brampton	Beginning of eastern segment; formerly western end of Highway 10 / Highway 24 concurrency
Dufferin–Peel boundary	Mono–Caledon boundary	149.8	93.1	Peel Regional Road 7 south / Dufferin County Road 18 north (Airport Road)	Mono Mills
Simcoe–Peel boundary	Adjala-Tosorontio–Caledon boundary	154.9	96.3	Regional Road 8 south (The Gore Road)	
Simcoe–Peel boundary	Adjala-Tosorontio–Caledon boundary	151.5	94.1	Mono–Adjala Townline	Highway 9 crosses the Niagara Escarpment
Simcoe–Peel boundary	Adjala-Tosorontio–Caledon boundary	158.7	98.6	Peel Regional Road 50 south – Palgrave, Bolton; Simcoe County Road 50 north – Alliston	Formerly Highway 50
Simcoe–Peel boundary	New Tecumseth–Caledon boundary	164.4	102.2	County Road 10 north (Tottenham Road) – Tottenham	
Simcoe–York boundary	New Tecumseth–King boundary	171.3	106.4	County Road 15 north (Sideroad 15)	
Simcoe–York boundary	New Tecumseth–King boundary	179.7	111.7	York Regional Road 27 south – Nobleton; Simcoe County Road 27 north – Cookstown	Formerly Highway 27
York	King	186.7	116.0	Highway 400 – Toronto, Barrie York Regional Road 31 begins	Highway 400 exit 55; Highway 9 eastern terminus
York	Newmarket	191.5	119.0	Regional Road 1 (Yonge Street) Regional Road 31 east (Davis Drive)	Formerly Highway 11; former Highway 9 eastern terminus
1.000 mi = 1.609 km; 1.000 km = 0.621 mi: Closed/former; Route transition
