= Ontario Highway 4 =

Ontario provincial highway

Highway 4
- A map of Highway 4 Highway 4 Connecting Links; Sections downloaded in 1998

Route information
- Maintained by Ministry of Transportation of Ontario
- Length: 100.8 km (62.6 mi)
- Existed: June 24, 1920–present

Major junctions
- South end: Highway 3 – St. Thomas
- Highway 401 – London; Highway 402 – London; Highway 7 – Elginfield
- North end: Highway 8 – Clinton

Location
- Country: Canada
- Province: Ontario
- Major cities: St. Thomas, London
- Towns: Exeter, Clinton

Highway system
- Ontario provincial highways; Current; Former; 400-series
| ← Highway 3 | → Highway 5 |
Former provincial highways
| ← Highway 3B | Highway 4A → |

King's Highway 4, also known as Highway 4, is a provincially maintained highway in the Canadian province of Ontario. Originally much longer than its present 100.8 km (62.6 mi) length, more than half of Highway 4 was transferred to the responsibility of local governments in 1998. It travels between Highway 3 in Talbotville Royal, north-west of St. Thomas, and Highway 8 in Clinton, passing through the city of London in between.

Highway 4 was first designated in 1920, when a 51-kilometre (32 mi) route between Talbotville Royal and Elginfield was assumed by the Department of Highways. It was extended in the early 1930s, both south to Port Stanley, as well as north to Flesherton.

== Route description ==
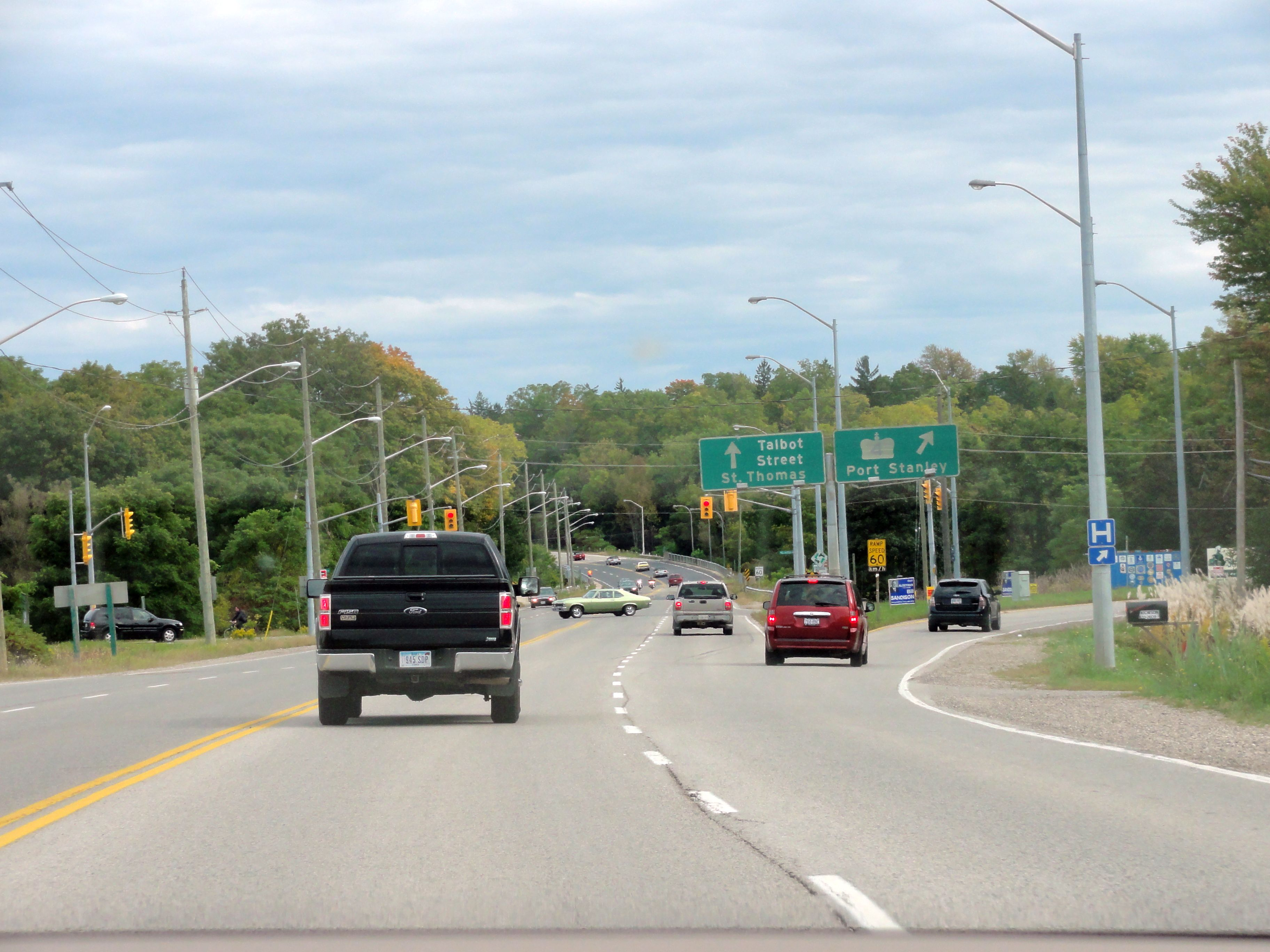
The Highway 4 / Talbot Street junction in St. Thomas

Highway 4 starts at an intersection with Highway 3 in Talbotville Royal and continues north as a two-lane undivided highway. For most of its length, the highway bisects agricultural land. It travels along a short 2.7-kilometre (1.7 mi) concurrency with Highway 401 from the community of Tempo to Wonderland Road. It encounters an interchange with Highway 402 before entering London city limits. As Highway 4 enters London, it becomes a Connecting Link, known locally as Wonderland Road. Wonderland Road is a 4-lane arterial thoroughfare serving western London, with several big-box stores, a mall, and residential areas. The route turns east onto Sunningdale Road West, which it for a short distance before turning north along Richmond Street.

Highway 4 continues north, passing through Arva, when the surrounding terrain returns to farmland. Highway 4 passes through Birr before intersecting with the western terminus of Highway 7 at Elginfield, which is also 1 km east of the Highway 23 junction with Highway 7. The highway then curves slightly west, passing through Lucan before continuing north at Clandeboye. From here to its terminus in Clinton, Highway 4 is essentially straight for 45 kilometres (28 mi). Continuing to be flanked by farmland, it then passes through the communities of Huron Park and Exeter. At Exeter, it crosses the former route of Highway 83. From there, it continues north, passing through the communities of Hensall, Ontario and Vanastra, Ontario before terminating at Highway 8 in the community of Clinton.

== History ==
Highway 4 north of St. Thomas in 1948

Highway 4 was originally designated in 1920 when the provincial government assumed the road running from Talbotville Royal (St. Thomas) to the Northern Highway (later Highway 7) at Elginfield, via London. The portions within Elgin County were assumed on August 4, while the portions south of London were assumed on June 24. The portions north of and through London were assumed on August 6. The 51.2-kilometre (31.8 mi) route featured a concurrency with the Provincial Highway (later Highway 2) between Lambeth and downtown London.

Until the summer of 1925, Ontario highways were named rather than numbered. When route numbering was introduced, the route between St. Thomas and Elginfield became Provincial Highway 4. 1927 saw several new sections of road assumed that would become portion of Highway 4. On September 14, the route was extended to Highway 8 at Clinton. Further north, a new highway was created on June 22, 1927, between Highway 9 at Walkerton and Highway 6 at Durham. This latter section was designated as Highway 4A.

On March 12, 1930, Highway 4 was extended to Durham, fully absorbing the route of Highway 4A in the process. Two months later, on May 11, it was extended south to Bedford Street (now Edith Cavell Boulevard) in Port Stanley. On April 11, 1934, the highway was extended east to the intersection of Highway 10 in Flesherton. Highway 4 reached its maximum length of 275.6 kilometres (171.2 mi) when it was extended from Flesherton to Highway 24 in Singhampton in the mid-1970s.

=== Downloads ===
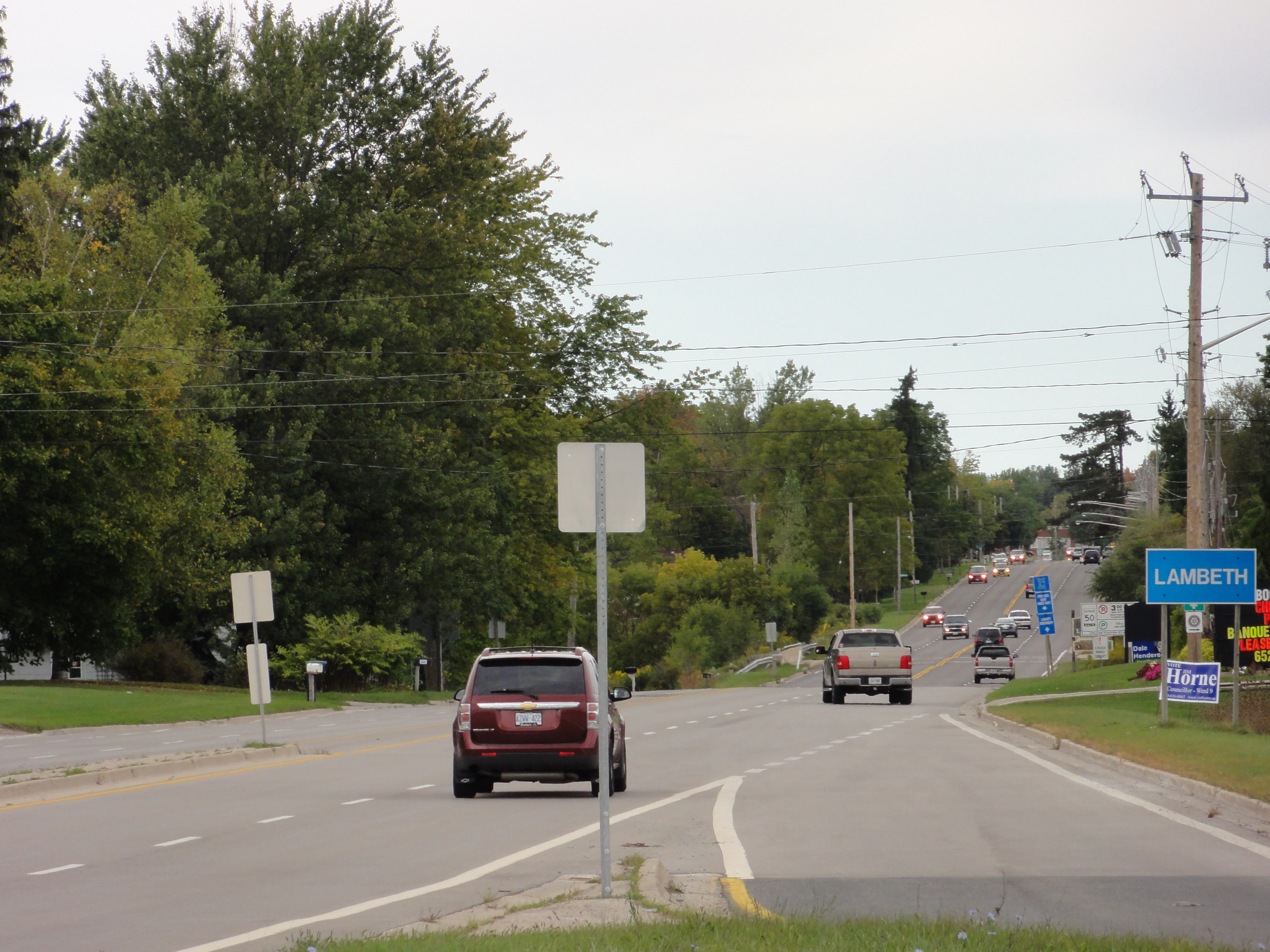
Former alignment of Highway 4 looking north towards Lambeth from the Highway 402 interchange in London

As part of a series of budget cuts initiated by premier Mike Harris under his Common Sense Revolution platform in 1995, numerous highways deemed to no longer be of significance to the provincial network were decommissioned and responsibility for the routes transferred to a lower level of government, a process referred to as downloading. Portions of Highway 4 were transferred to the counties of Elgin, Huron, Bruce and Grey on January 1, 1998.

The former portion of Highway 4 south of St. Thomas is now signed as Elgin County Road 4. The former northern portion is broken into several different roads:

- Huron County Road 4 from Clinton to near Wingham
- Bruce County Road 4 (London Road) from near Wingham to Riversdale
- A former concurrency with Highway 9 between Riversdale and Walkerton
- Grey County Road 4 from Walkerton to Simcoe County Road 124 just south of Singhampton

In 2017, the City of London announced that Highway 4 through London would be re-signed and re-routed via Richmond Street, Sunningdale Road, and Wonderland Road, resulting in a short concurrency with Highway 401 between the Colonel Talbot Road and Wonderland Road interchanges.

== Major intersections ==
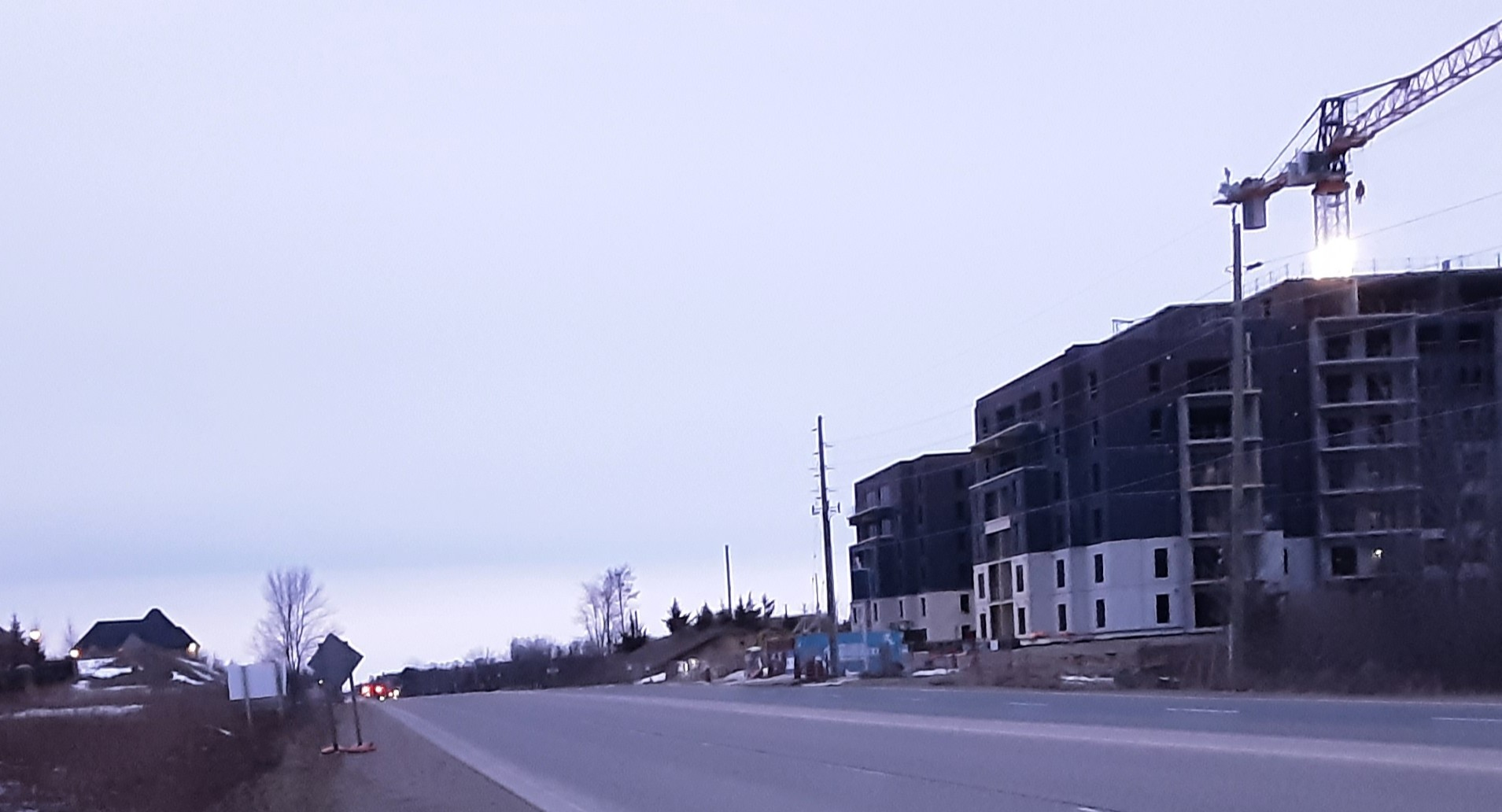
Northbound Highway 4 exiting London city limits near Arva; this original alignment was not affected by the 2017 re-routing.

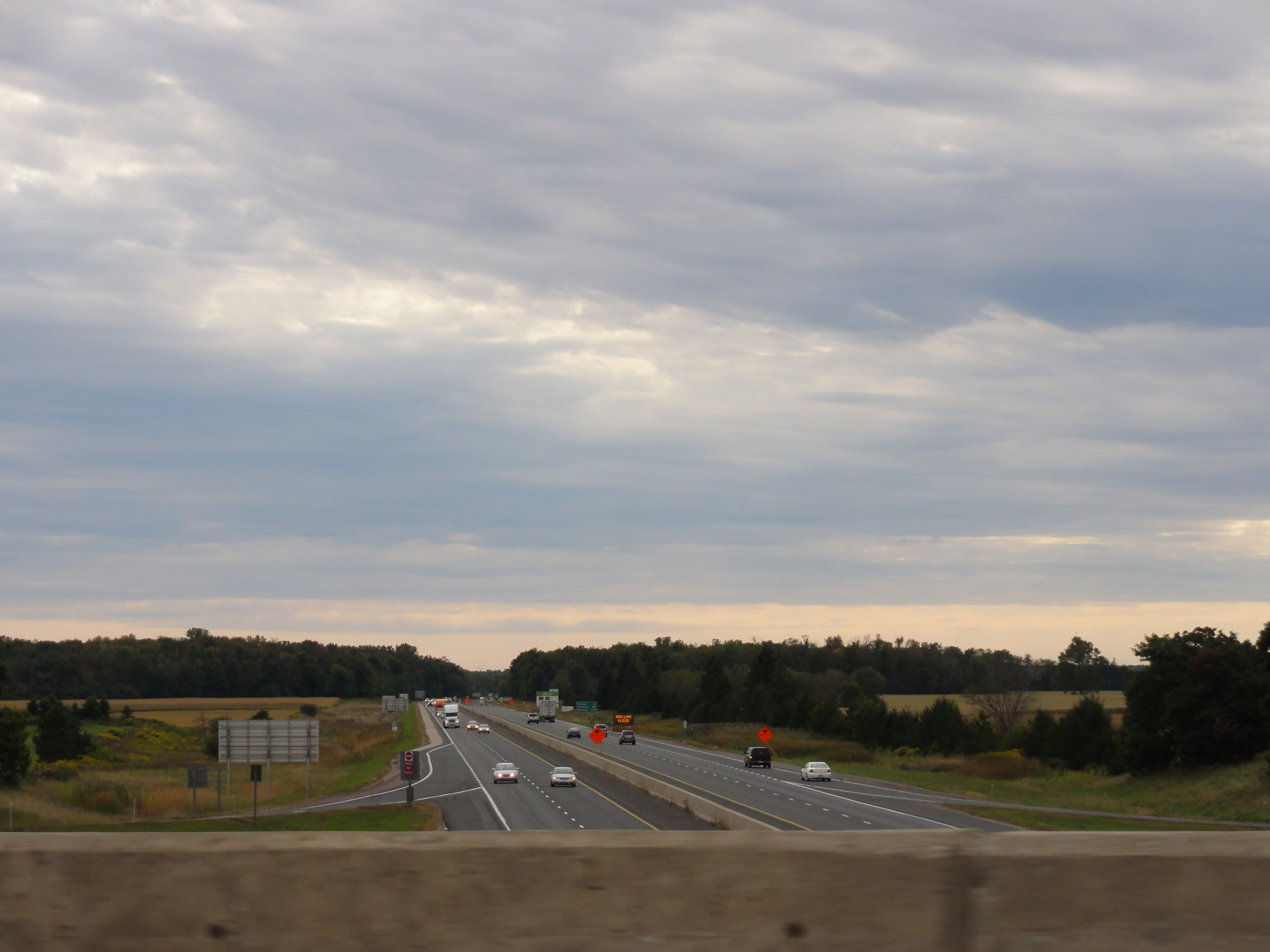
Highway 401 West viewed from Highway 4 overpass in London

The following table lists the major junctions along Highway 4, as noted by the Ministry of Transportation of Ontario.

| Division | Location | km | mi | Destinations | Notes |
|---|---|---|---|---|---|
| Elgin | Central Elgin | −19.2 | −11.9 | Edith Cavell Boulevard | Port Stanley; former Highway 4 southern terminus |
| Elgin | Central Elgin | −17.3 | −10.7 | Elgin County Road 4 begins County Road 21 west (Warren Street) | |
| St. Thomas | | −7.5– −2.2 | −4.7– −1.4 | 5.3 km (3.3 mi) gap in County Road 4 | |
| Elgin | Southwold | 0.0 | 0.0 | Elgin County Road 4 ends Highway 4 begins Highway 3 east – St. Thomas, Aylmer; County Road 3 west (Talbot Line) | Talbotville Royal; Highway 4 southern terminus |
| Elgin | Southwold | 2.1 | 1.3 | County Road 11 east (Clinton Line) | |
| Elgin–London boundary | Southwold–London boundary | 3.5 | 2.2 | County Road 18 west (Southminster Borne) | |
| London | | 6.0 | 3.7 | Highway 401 west – Windsor Colonel Talbot Road | Beginning of Highway 401 concurrency; Highway 401 exit 177 |
| London | | 8.8 | 5.5 | Highway 401 east – Toronto Wonderland Road | End of Highway 401 concurrency; Highway 401 exit 180 |
| London | | 15.9 | 9.9 | Highway 402 east to Highway 401 – Sarnia | Highway 402 exit 100 |
| London | | 18.1 | 11.2 | Exeter Road | Formerly Highway 135 |
| London | | 18.4 | 11.4 | Wharncliffe Road S | Former routing of Highway 4 (before Jan. 2018) and Highway 2 along Wharncliffe Rd |
| London | | 29.8 | 18.5 | Fanshawe Park Road W | Formerly Highway 22 west |
| London | | 34.0 | 21.1 | Richmond St / Sunningdale Rd | Former routing of Highway 4 via Richmond Street south |
| Middlesex | Middlesex Centre | 31.6 | 19.6 | County Road 28 (Medway Road) | Arva |
| Middlesex | Middlesex Centre | 37.2 | 23.1 | County Road 16 (Ilderton Road) | |
| Middlesex | Middlesex Centre–Lucan Biddulph boundary | 45.4 | 28.2 | Highway 7 east to Highway 23 north – Stratford, Mitchell; County Road 7 west (Elginfield Road) – Ailsa Craig, Parkhill | Elginfield |
| Middlesex | Lucan Biddulph | 49.4 | 30.7 | County Road 47 (Saintsbury Line) | Lucan |
| Middlesex | Lucan Biddulph | 50.1 | 31.1 | County Road 13 (William Street, Alice Street) | Lucan |
| Middlesex | North Middlesex–Lucan Biddulph boundary | 54.3 | 33.7 | County Road 20 south (Denfield Road) | Clandeboye |
| Middlesex | North Middlesex–Lucan Biddulph boundary | 56.1 | 34.9 | County Road 24 west (McGillivray Road) | |
| Middlesex–Huron boundary | North Middlesex–Lucan Biddulph–South Huron boundary | 62.2 | 38.6 | County Road 5 west (Mount Carmel Road) | Centralia |
| Huron | South Huron | 66.3 | 41.2 | County Road 10 west (Crediton Road) | |
| Huron | South Huron | 68.4 | 42.5 | County Road 6 east (Kirkton Road) | |
| Huron | South Huron | 72.4 | 45.0 | County Road 83 (Thames Road) | Exeter; formerly Highway 83 |
| Huron | Bluewater | 80.3 | 49.9 | County Road 84 (King Street) | Hensall; formerly Highway 84 |
| Huron | Bluewater–Huron East boundary | 84.3 | 52.4 | County Road 12 (Kippen Road) | Kippen |
| Huron | Bluewater–Huron East boundary | 90.4 | 56.2 | County Road 3 (Mill Road) | Brucefield |
| Huron | Central Huron (Clinton) | 100.7 | 62.6 | County Road 13 east (King Street) | |
| Huron | Central Huron (Clinton) | 100.8 | 62.6 | Highway 8 – Goderich, Stratford Highway 4 ends Huron County Road 4 begins | Highway 4 northern terminus; continues as County Road 4 |
| Huron | North Huron–Morris-Turnberry boundary | 135.8 | 84.4 | County Road 86 (Amberley Road) | Wingham; formerly Highway 86 |
| Huron–Bruce boundary | Morris-Turnberry–South Bruce boundary | 143.4– 144.9 | 89.1– 90.0 | Huron County Road 4 ends Bruce County Road 4 begins | 1.5 km (0.9 mi) Huron County Road 4 / Bruce County Road 4 concurrency |
| Bruce | Brockton | 161.8 | 100.5 | Highway 9 west – Harriston County Road 20 north | Former southern end of Highway 9 concurrency |
| Bruce | Brockton | 175.3 | 108.9 | Highway 9 east – Kincardine | Walkerton; former northern end of Highway 9 concurrency |
| Bruce–Grey boundary | Brockton–Hanover boundary | 186.7 | 116.0 | Bruce County Road 4 ends Grey County Road 4 begins | |
| Grey | Hanover | 187.4 | 116.4 | County Road 10 (7th Avenue) | |
| Grey | West Grey | 205.8 | 127.9 | Highway 6 – Owen Sound, Mount Forest | Durham |
| Grey | Grey Highlands | 230.7 | 143.4 | Highway 10 – Owen Sound, Shelburne | Flesherton |
| Grey–Simcoe boundary | Grey Highlands–Clearview boundary | 256.7 | 159.5 | Grey County Road 124 / Simcoe County Road 124 | Singhampton; formerly Highway 24; former Highway 4 northern terminus |
1.000 mi = 1.609 km; 1.000 km = 0.621 mi: Closed/former; Concurrency terminus; Route transition
