= Sunshine, Ontario =

Sunshine
- Dispersed rural community
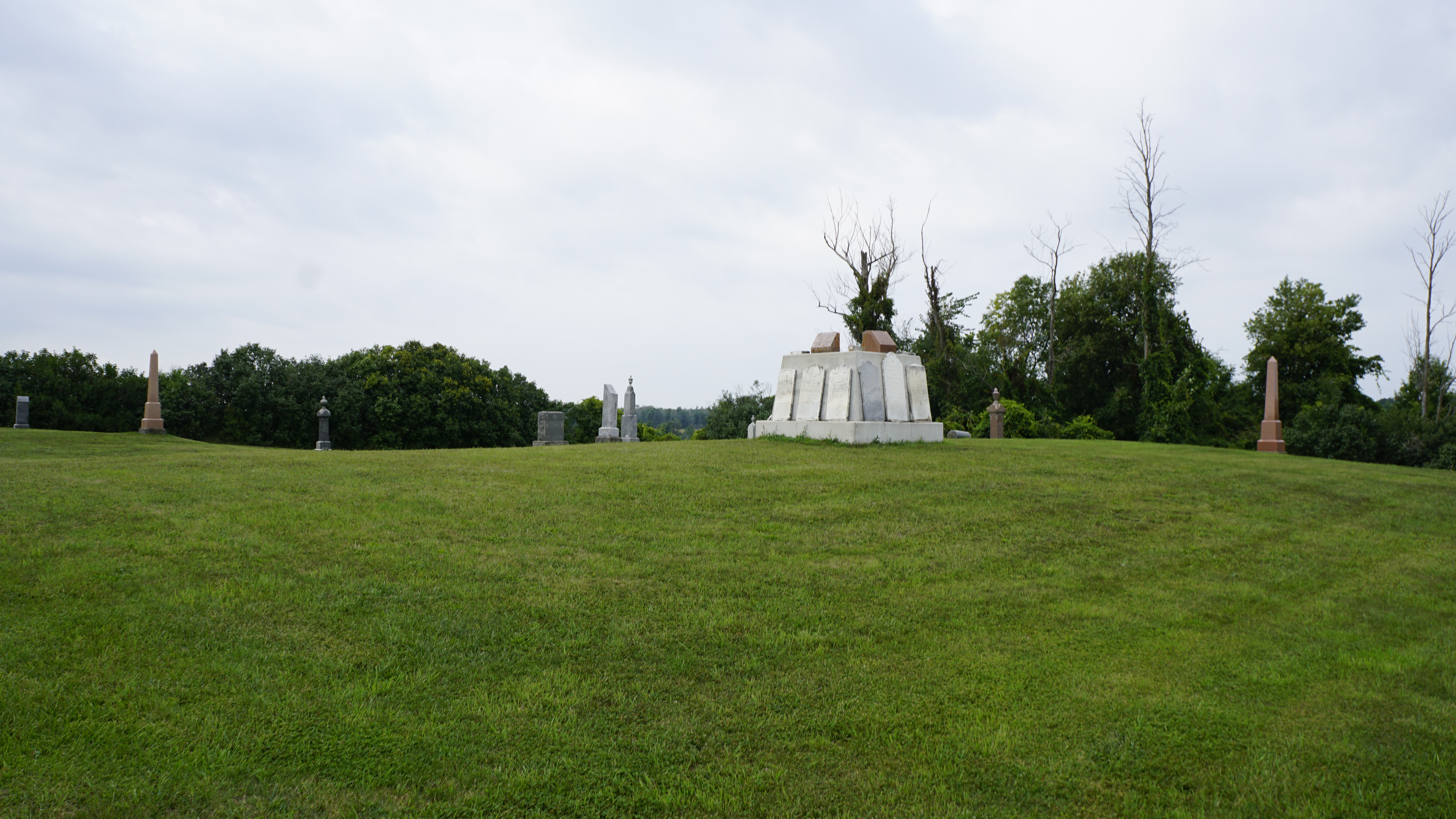
- Sunshine Cemetery

- Location of Sunshine Sunshine (Canada)
- Coordinates: 43°46′58″N 81°20′08″W
- Country: Canada
- Province: Ontario
- County: Huron County
- Municipality: Morris-Turnberry
- Time zone: UTC-5 (Eastern (EST))
  - Summer (DST): UTC-4 (EDT)
- GNBC Code: FCUBZ

Sunshine is a dispersed rural community in the municipality of Morris-Turnberry, Huron County, Ontario, Canada.

Sunshine prospered as a milling and manufacturing town from the 1850s to the 1880s.

== History ==
The early settlement had a water-powered sawmill on the Maitland River. The mill later converted to steam power, and lumber from the mill was manufactured into chairs at a nearby factory.

Two churches were located at Sunshine: Bethel Church, erected in 1855, and the Sunshine Methodist Church, which opened as a loghouse church. In 1875, Sunshine Methodist built a frame church which was later bricked.

Sunshine had a blacksmith, general store, and post office which opened in 1874. An Orange lodge was located there, which later became a Foresters lodge, and then Sons of Temperance lodge. The main street of Sunshine was gravelled, and the stores fronted onto a boardwalk.

The sawmill and chair factory were destroyed by fire in 1878, and were soon rebuilt.

=== Decline ===
Sunshine declined in the 1880s as railway lines were built to nearby towns. Bethel Church closed in 1883, and the general store closed in 1887. When the availability of timber diminished—as farms in the surrounding had been cleared of trees —the sawmill and chair factory were dismantled and moved in 1888. Three houses remained in Sunshine in 1891. The post office closed in 1914, and the Sunshine Methodist Church closed in 1927.

Sunshine Methodist Church cemetery remains at the settlement, with gravestones placed into a cairn.
