= Ontario Highway 87 =

Highway in Ontario, Canada

King's Highway 87

Route information
- Maintained by the Ministry of Transportation of Ontario
- Length: 30.1 km (18.7 mi)
- Existed: 1937–1998

Major junctions
- West end: Highway 86 in Bluevale
- East end: Highway 89 near Harriston

Location
- Country: Canada
- Province: Ontario

Highway system
- Ontario provincial highways; Current; Former; 400-series
← Highway 86	→ Highway 88

King's Highway 87, commonly referred to as Highway 87, was a provincially maintained highway in the Canadian province of Ontario. The 30.1-kilometre (18.7 mi) route connected Highway 86 in Bluevale with Highway 89 (present-day Highway 23) near Harriston. In 1997-1998, Highway 87 was downloaded to Huron and Wellington counties and the road is now officially known as Huron County Road 87 and Wellington County Road 87.

== Major intersections ==
The following table lists the major junctions along Highway 87, as noted by the Ministry of Transportation of Ontario.

Division	Location	km	mi	Destinations	Notes
Huron	Bluevale	0.0	0.0	Highway 86 – Wingham, Listowel	Present-day County Road 86
Huron	Wroxeter	7.5	4.7	County Road 12 south (Brussels Line)	
Huron	Wroxeter	8.0	5.0	County Road 12 north (Belmore Line)	
Huron	Gorrie	11.7	7.3	County Road 28 south (Victoria Street)	
Huron	Howick	13.8	8.6	County Road 28 north (McIntosh Line)	
Huron	Howick	17.9	11.1	County Road 30 (Fordwich Line) – Clifford, Fordwich	
Wellington	Minto	30.1	18.7	Highway 89 – Harriston, Palmerston	Present-day Highway 23
1.000 mi = 1.609 km; 1.000 km = 0.621 mi
