= Ontario Highway 83 =

Former Ontario provincial highway

King's Highway 83

Route information
- Maintained by the Ministry of Transportation
- Length: 38.8 km (24.1 mi)
- Existed: April 13, 1938–April 1, 1997

Major junctions
- West end: Highway 21 near Grand Bend
- Highway 4 – London
- East end: Highway 23 – Russeldale

Location
- Country: Canada
- Province: Ontario
- Counties: Huron, Perth
- Towns: Russeldale

Highway system
- Ontario provincial highways; Current; Former; 400-series
← Highway 82	→ Highway 84

King's Highway 83, also known as Highway 83, was a provincially maintained highway in the Canadian province of Ontario. The route travelled inwards from the shores of Lake Huron, beginning at Highway 21 north of Grand Bend and travelling eastward to Highway 23 in Russeldale. Today the route is known by the local names Dashwood Road and Thames Road, as well as by county-assigned designations Huron County Road 83 and Perth County Road 20.

== Route description ==
Highway 83 was a straight highway connecting Highway 21 north of Grand Bend with Highway 23 in Russeldale, lying almost entirely within Huron County. Today, the majority of the former route is known as County Road 83, although the portion that lay within Perth County became part of County Road 20.

Between the termini of the route, the highway passed through the communities of Dashwood, Thames Road and Farquhar, as well as the town of Exeter. Outside these locations, the surroundings of the former route consist of a mix of farmland and woodlots. West of Hay, itself lying immediately north of Exeter, the Hay Swamp, a provincially significant wetland and conservation area, lies immediately north of the route.

== History ==
Highway 83 was first established by the Department of Highways in 1938 to connect Highway 21 near Grand Bend with Highway 23 in Russeldale. On April 13, 1938, the 38.6-kilometre (24.0 mi) Thames Road was assumed into the expanding provincial highway network. The route remained generally unchanged over the years, aside from being paved. In 1997, Highway 83 was deemed to serve a local function and was transferred to Perth and Huron counties on April 1, decommissioning the route in the process.

== Major intersections ==
The following table lists the major junctions along Highway 83, as noted by the Ministry of Transportation of Ontario.

Division	Location	km	mi	Destinations	Notes
Huron	Grand Bend	0.0	0.0	Highway 21	
Huron	Dashwood	8.4	5.2	County Road 2 south	
Huron	Bluewater–South Huron boundary	10.5	6.5	County Road 2 north – Zurich	
Huron	Exeter	19.8	12.3		Western town limit
Huron	Exeter	20.8	12.9	Highway 4 – London	
Huron	Exeter	21.9	13.6		Eastern town limit
Huron	South Huron	28.8	17.9	County Road 11	
Perth	Russeldale	38.8	24.1	Highway 23	
1.000 mi = 1.609 km; 1.000 km = 0.621 mi
