= Ontario Highway 23 =

Ontario provincial highway

Highway 23
- Map of Highway 23; Current route Former route

Route information
- Maintained by the Ministry of Transportation of Ontario
- Length: 97.7 km (60.7 mi)
- Existed: June 22, 1927–present

Major junctions
- South end: Highway 7 near Elginfield
- Highway 8 in Mitchell
- North end: Highway 9 / Highway 89 in Harriston

Location
- Country: Canada
- Province: Ontario
- Counties: Middlesex, Huron, Perth, Wellington
- Towns: Mitchell, Monkton, Listowel, Palmerston, Harriston

Highway system
- Ontario provincial highways; Current; Former; 400-series
← Highway 21	→ Highway 24
Former provincial highways
← Highway 22

King's Highway 23, commonly referred to as Highway 23, is a provincially maintained highway in the Canadian province of Ontario. The route travels from Highway 7 east of Elginfield north to Highway 9 and Highway 89 in Harriston. The total length of Highway 23 is 97.7 kilometres (60.7 miles). The highway was first established in 1927 between Highway 8 in Mitchell and Highway 9 in Teviotdale, via Monkton, Listowel and Palmerston. As part of a depression relief program, it was extended south to Highway 7 in 1934. It remained relatively unchanged until 2003, when it was rerouted northward from Palmerston to Harriston.

== Route description ==
Highway 23 begins at Highway 7, east of Elginfield, a community straddling the boundary between the municipalities of Middlesex Centre and Lucan Biddulph. The route travels north through the latter, surrounded on both sides by farmland. At Whalen Corners, the highway curves northeast as it exits Middlesex County, becoming the boundary road between Huron County to the west and Perth County to the east. The highway passes through the communities of Woodham and Kirkton, crossing completely into Perth County just north of the latter. It later enters Russeldale, meeting the eastern terminus of former Highway 83 (County Road 83) as it swerves north. Approximately 9 kilometres (5.6 mi) beyond there it enters the town of Mitchell, where it is known as Blanchard Street. The route intersects Highway 8 (Huron Street), and becomes concurrent with it briefly to cross the North Thames River before branching back northeast along St. George Street. Midway between Mitchell and the village of Monkton, the highway bisects the community of Bornholm within the municipality of West Perth. Prior to entering Monkton, Highway 23 curves gently towards the southeast; In the middle of the village, drivers must turn at an intersection with Perth County Road 55 to remain on Highway 23.

Highway 8 and Highway 23 cross the North Thames River in Mitchell

Continuing its northeasterly course, the highway passes through more farmland, now within the town of North Perth, and serves the communities of Newry and Atwood before encountering former Highway 86 (County Road 86) on the western edge of Listowel. South of this intersection, the route is known locally as Mitchell Road South. It turns southeast onto Main Street West, where it once travelled concurrently with Highway 86 before turning northeast onto Wallace Avenue North. The final leg of the route passes through the village of Gowanstown. The route gently curves to the east before turning north at an intersection just west of Palmerston, where it crosses the boundary into Wellington County and the Town of Minto. Eight kilometres (5 miles) north of the intersection, Highway 23 encounters the western terminus of former Highway 87 (County Road 87), where it turns east then northeast. The route enters Harriston, where it is locally known as Arthur Street. The Highway 23 designation ends at a junction with Highway 9 and Wellington County Road 109 (formerly a segment of Highway 9), locally known as Elora Street. The road continues beyond the junction as Highway 89.

== History ==
Highway 23 was first established on June 22, 1927, when the Department of Highways assumed the road from Mitchell to Teviotdale through Perth and Wellington counties, via Monkton, Listowel and Palmerston, connecting Highway 8 and Highway 9. As part of depression relief work undertaken by the department during the early 1930s, Highway 23 was extended from Highway 8 to Highway 7 east of Elginfield on July 11, 1934. Highway 23 remained unaltered between 1934 and 1998. On January 1, 1998, the section from the Highway 89 junction west of Palmerston to Highway 9 in Teviotdale was decommissioned, resulting in the northern terminus of Highway 23 becoming the western terminus of Highway 89. During the spring of 2003, the segment of Highway 89 between this junction and Harriston was renumbered as Highway 23, resulting in the current routing.

== Major intersections ==
The following table lists the major junctions along Highway 23, as noted by the Ministry of Transportation of Ontario.

Division	Location	km	mi	Destinations	Notes
Middlesex	Lucan Biddulph	0.0	0.0	Highway 7 to Highway 4 – London, Elginfield, Stratford	Highway 23 southern terminus
Middlesex	Lucan Biddulph	4.3	2.7	County Road 47 (Fallon Drive) – Lucan, Granton	
Middlesex–Perth boundary	Lucan Biddulph–Perth South boundary	10.4	6.5	Whalen Line	Whalen Corners
Huron–Perth boundary	South Huron–Perth South boundary	10.8	6.7	Huron County Road 11 north (Hern Line)	Whalen Corners
Huron–Perth boundary	South Huron–Perth South boundary	18.3	11.4	Huron County Road 6 west / Perth County Line 8 east	Kirkton
Perth	West Perth	26.4	16.4	County Line 20 – Fullarton	Russeldale
Perth	West Perth	28.7	17.8	County Line 24 west	
Perth	West Perth	32.7	20.3	County Road 163 south	
Perth	West Perth (Mitchell)	36.0	22.4	Frank Street	Beginning of Mitchell Connecting Link agreement
Perth	West Perth (Mitchell)	37.0	23.0	Highway 8 west – Clinton, Goderich	Southern end of Highway 8 concurrency
Perth	West Perth (Mitchell)	37.2	23.1	Highway 8 east – Stratford, Kitchener	Northern end of Highway 8 concurrency
Perth	West Perth (Mitchell)	38.4	23.9	Frances Street	End of Mitchell Connecting Link agreement
Perth	West Perth	45.6	28.3	County Line 44	Bornholm
Perth	West Perth–North Perth boundary	53.3	33.1	County Line 55 west	
Perth	West Perth–North Perth boundary	54.3	33.7	County Line 55 east (Maddison Street East)	Monkton
Perth	West Perth	63.4	39.4	County Line 72 – Brussels	Newry
Perth	West Perth (Listowel)	73.3	45.5	County Line 86 west – Wingham	Beginning of Listowel Connecting Link agreement; formerly Highway 86 west; former southern end of Highway 86 concurrency
Perth	West Perth (Listowel)	74.4	46.2	County Line 86 east (Main Street East)	Formerly Highway 86 east; former northern end of Highway 86 concurrency
Perth	West Perth (Listowel)	76.0	47.2	David Street	End of Listowel Connecting Link agreement
Perth	West Perth	80.1	49.8	County Line 88 west	Gowanstown
Perth–Wellington boundary	West Perth–Minto boundary	87.5	54.4	Perth County Road 178 west / Wellington County Road 4 west	
Perth–Wellington boundary	West Perth–Minto boundary	88.0	54.7	Perth County Line 93 east / Wellington County Road 123 east	Palmerston; former Highway 23 alignment; Highway 23 follows former Highway 89 alignment
Wellington	Minto	96.1	59.7	County Road 87 west (Harriston Road)	Formerly Highway 87 west
Wellington	Harriston	97.7	60.7	Highway 9 north / County Road 109 south (Elora Street) – Clifford, Teviotdale Highway 89 east (Arthur Street) – Mount Forest	Highway 23 northern terminus; continues as Highway 89
Former alignment via Perth County Line 93 / Wellington County Road 123
Perth–Wellington boundary	West Perth–Minto boundary	88.0	54.7	Highway 23 – Listowel, Harriston	Continuation from Highway 23 south; formerly Highway 89 east
Wellington	Minto	88.8	55.2	Wellington County Road 8 east (King Street) to Perth County Line 91	Palmerston
Wellington	Minto	90.0	55.9	County Road 5 north (Whites Road)	Palmerston
Wellington–Perth boundary	Minto–Mapleton–North Perth boundary	96.7	60.1	Wellington County Road 9 south / Perth County Road 140 south	
Wellington–Perth boundary	Minto–Mapleton–North Perth boundary	96.8	60.1	Wellington County Road 7 south – Elora; Wellington County Road 109 – Arthur, Harriston	Teviotdale; formerly Highway 9; former Highway 23 northern terminus
1.000 mi = 1.609 km; 1.000 km = 0.621 mi: Closed/former; Concurrency terminus
