= List of suffixed routes of Ontario Highway 8 =

This is a list of suffixed routes of Ontario Highway 8. There have been seven confirmed iterations of Highway 8 with a suffixed route number, all but two of which were the original route of the highway prior to the construction of a bypass or diversion.

== Highway 8A (St. David's–Queenston) ==
Highway 8A
- Location: York Street (St. David's–Queenston and Queenston-Lewiston Bridge
- Length: 4.6 km (2.9 mi)
- Existed: October 13, 1920–September 1, 1970

The Hamilton–Queenston Highway was assumed as part of "The Provincial Highway" in August 1918. On October 13 of that year, several roads were taken over by the province between St. David's and the Whirlpool Rapids Bridge in Niagara Falls. When highway numbers were introduced in the summer of 1925, the route between St. David's and Niagara Falls was designated as part of Highway 8, while the route between St. David's and the bridge to New York was designated as Highway 8A. Highway 8A followed York Road to Front Street before crossing the Queenston-Lewiston Bridge. It remained in place until September 1, 1970, when it was transferred to the newly-formed Regional Municipality of Niagara, along with Highway 8.

== Highway 8A (Stoney Creek–Burlington) ==
Highway 8A
- Location: York Street (St. David's–Queenston and Queenston-Lewiston Bridge
- Length: 4.6 km (2.9 mi)
- Existed: October 13, 1920–September 1, 1970

A predecessor to Highway 20, Highway 8A followed what is now known as Centennial Parkway, as well as Beach Boulevard and Lakeshore Road across Burlington Beach. It began near Stoney Creek at Queenston Road (Highway 8) and ended at the corner of North Shore Boulevard East, Maple Avenue, and Lakeshore Road (the latter two comprising part of Highway 2).

- 7.6 miles (12.2 km)
- Renumbered as part of Highway 20 in 1932

== Highway 8 Alt (Kitchener) ==
- 1958 to 1960, only appears in the 1958 and 1959 Ontario Road Maps
- Followed King Street and Queen Street through downtown Kitchener following Highway being rerouted along Ottawa Street and Courtland Avenue

== Highway 8B (New Hamburg) ==
Highway 8B
- Location: Huron Street, Waterloo Street, and Snyder's Road – New Hamburg, Baden
- Length: 7.2 km (4.5 mi)
- Existed: 1957–?

== Highway 8B (Rockton) ==
- 1959 to April 1, 1970
- Followed what is now Old Highway 8, created when Rockton was bypassed in 1958.

== Highway 8B (Sheffield) ==
- 1959 to April 1, 1970
- Followed what is now Old Highway 8, created when Sheffield was bypassed in 1958.
