= Tempo, Ontario =

Tempo
- Location of Tempo in Ontario
- Coordinates: 42°51′24″N 81°16′40″W
- Country: Canada
- Province: Ontario
- Region: Southwestern Ontario
- Municipality: London
- Elevation: 257 m (843 ft)
- Time zone: UTC-5 (Eastern Time Zone)
  - Summer (DST): UTC-4 (Eastern Time Zone)
- Area codes: 519, 226

Tempo is an unincorporated place in the city of London in Southwestern Ontario, Canada. It is located just south of the community of Lambeth at interchange 177 of Ontario Highway 401 with the former Ontario Highway 4.

== History ==
Tempo originally was a village in Westminster Township, Middlesex County. It had a post office until it closed in 1913. Most of the village was demolished in the 1950s during the construction of Highway 401. There was one church, called Tempo Presbyterian Church, which opened in the mid-19th century and closed down in the first decade of the 21st century. The building still stands, as the Rose Chapel, a wedding venue.

== Education ==
Children who live in Tempo attend primary school in Lambeth.

== Economy ==
Farms in the area are mostly cash crop, and a few cash crop/livestock mixed farms. The livestock raised are cattle and sheep, and the main grown crop are corn and beans. There are two farmer's markets in Tempo, Farmer Jack's and Thomas Brothers Market, both of which sell locally grown fruits and vegetables, along with local meats.

There also is a Best Western Plus hotel south of Highway 401 interchange.
