= Ontario Highway 85 =

Ontario provincial highway

Highway 85
- Highway 85 highlighted in red

Route information
- Maintained by the Ministry of Transportation of Ontario
- Length: 9.8 km (6.1 mi)
- Existed: March 28, 1934–present

Major junctions
- South end: Highway 7 (Victoria Street) in Kitchener
- North end: Regional Road 15 (King Street) in Woolwich Township; Regional Road 85 continues north

Location
- Country: Canada
- Province: Ontario

Highway system
- Ontario provincial highways; Current; Former; 400-series
← Highway 77	→ Highway 89
Former provincial highways
← Highway 84	Highway 87 →

Highway 86
- Length: 128.8 km (80.0 mi)
- Existed: 1937–2003

King's Highway 85, commonly referred to as Highway 85, is a provincially maintained highway in the Canadian province of Ontario, connecting Highway 7 to immediately north of the Waterloo city limits. The 10-kilometre (6.2 mi) highway, which is mostly controlled-access, travels through the Regional Municipality of Waterloo along the Conestoga Parkway from its interchange with Highway 7, which continues south along the parkway, to an interchange with Regional Road 15 (King Street), where it continues as Regional Road 85 to St. Jacobs.

Prior to completion of the Conestoga Parkway through Waterloo, Highway 85 followed King Street north of Ottawa Street through Kitchener and Waterloo. Within the City of Waterloo, this former alignment is now maintained by the region as Regional Road 15. Within the city of Kitchener, the road is simply known as King Street. The parkway was constructed between 1968 and 1977. By 1980, Highway 85 was renumbered as Highway 86, to improve the continuity of provincial route numbers. However, when the majority of Highway 86 was decommissioned in 1998, the remaining portion was soon renumbered as Highway 85 in 2003.

== Route description ==
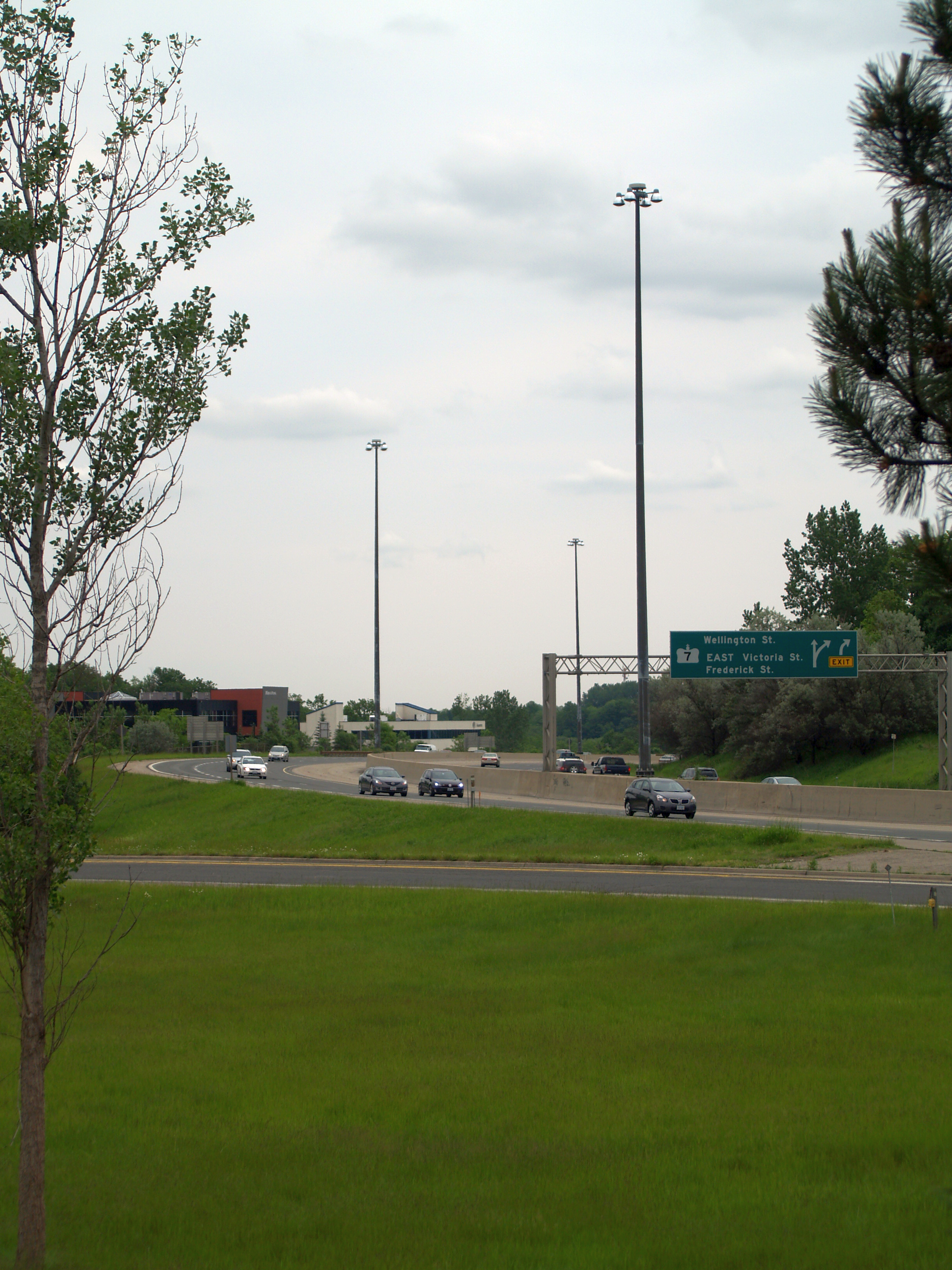
Highway 85 enters Kitchener along the Conestoga Parkway

Highway 85 begins in Kitchener at an interchange between the Conestoga Parkway and Victoria Street. At that interchange, Highway 7 exits the parkway, which from there northward on is Highway 85, and travels east on Victoria Street towards Guelph. The divided freeway continues north, swerving left and right through suburban Kitchener. It first crosses under a Via Rail line and then under Wellington Street, with which it has an interchange, after which it passes alongside the Grand River. As it enters the neighbourhood of Bridgeport, which it divides in two, the route curves west, interchanges with Lancaster Street and crosses into Waterloo.

The highway begins to curve north, interchanging with Bridgeport Road. The highway crosses the Conestoga Creek as it interchanges with University Avenue, then gradually curves to the west. After an interchange with King Street, once the original routing of Highway 85, the route curves back to the north and interchanges with Northfield Drive. As it approaches the rural–urban fringe of the tri-city area, the freeway interchanges with King Street a second time. Highway 85 ends at the north end of the ramps from King Street, as does the Conestoga Parkway. The divided freeway ends and the route become Waterloo Regional Road 85, which continues north to St. Jacobs and Elmira.

== History ==
Highway 85 was originally assumed by the Department of Highways (DHO), the predecessor to today's Ministry of Transportation of Ontario (MTO), during the mid-1930s. The existing Kitchener–Elmira Road was designated as Highway 85 on March 28, 1934. Initially, the route began at the intersection of Queen Street and King Street in downtown Kitchener, and proceeded north along King Street through Waterloo and St. Jacobs. North of St. Jacobs, the highway followed the same route as modern Waterloo Regional Road 85 to Elmira, ending at Church Street in downtown Elmira. Church Street itself would become Highway 86 several years later, on August 25, 1937, connecting Elmira and Amberley, and creating a short-lived common terminus between the two highways; Highway 86 was extended to Highway 7 near Guelph on April 13, 1938.

Highway 85 begins at the interchange in the lower-right corner of the image and follows the Conestoga Parkway north into the distance

Highway 85 remained unchanged for several decades until the Conestoga Parkway was constructed during the late 1960s and early 1970s. Construction of the new expressway began in February 1966 near King Street in Kitchener; however, construction of the section that is now Highway 85 did not begin until September 1968, when a C$5 million contract for the section between Frederick Street and Bridgeport Road was awarded. Soon thereafter, a second contract for the section between Bridgeport Road and King Street in Waterloo was awarded.

On April 16, 1970, the Highway 85 designation was moved from King Street to the new Conestoga Parkway; King Street was consequently transferred to local jurisdiction. Towards the end of the 1970s, construction began on a northward extension of the Conestoga Parkway from King Street to Northfield Drive; this was completed by 1977. By then, construction was underway on a two lane bypass of St. Jacobs east of the original route, connecting with the Conestoga Parkway at Northfield Drive, then an at-grade intersection. By the end of 1977, this bypass was completed.

In 1975, the eastern section of Highway 86, from Elmira to Guelph, was decommissioned, truncating the eastern terminus of it to the western terminus of Highway 85. To provide a more direct routing between the two highways, a bypass of Elmira was constructed along what is now Listowel Road. By the end of 1979, Highway 86 was rerouted along this bypass, and the northern section of Highway 85 was decommissioned. In 1980 or 1981, Highway 85 was renumbered as Highway 86, eliminating the designation temporarily and creating one continuous highway between Kitchener and Amberley, on the shores of Lake Huron.

On November 30, 1990, the Northfield Drive interchange was fully opened to traffic, eliminating a traffic signal from the northern end of the Conestoga Parkway. The speed limit on the parkway was lowered from 100 km/h (62 mph) to 90 km/h (56 mph) on January 10, 1994 following numerous cross-median collisions. In 1998, during the mass downloading of provincial highways to lower levels of government, the majority of Highway 86, from the Northfield Drive interchange to Amberley, was decommissioned. The Regional Municipality of Waterloo subsequently designated the section north from Waterloo to Elmira as Regional Road 85. Consequently, the remaining section of Highway 86, which exclusively followed the Conestoga Parkway, was renumbered as Highway 85 during the spring of 2003 to align the numbers and aid navigation.

== Major intersections ==
The following table lists the major junctions along Highway 85, as noted by the Ministry of Transportation of Ontario.

Division	Location	km	mi	Destinations	Notes
Waterloo	Kitchener	0.0	0.0	Highway 7 west (Conestoga Parkway) Highway 7 east / Regional Road 55 (Victoria Street) – Guelph	Highway 85 southern terminus; former Highway 86 southern terminus (1980-2003); Highway 85 follows Conestoga Parkway
Waterloo	Kitchener	0.4	0.25	Wellington Street	Future realignment of Highway 7 as part of the proposed Kitchener–Guelph freeway
Waterloo	Kitchener	2.0	1.2	Regional Road 29 (Lancaster Street)	Southbound exit to Regional Road 29 south; northbound entrance from Regional Road 29 north
Waterloo	Waterloo	2.7	1.7	Regional Road 9 (Bridgeport Road)	
Waterloo	Waterloo	4.2	2.6	Regional Road 57 (University Avenue)	
Waterloo	Waterloo	6.7	4.2	Regional Road 15 (King Street)	
Waterloo	Waterloo	7.9	4.9	Regional Road 50 (Northfield Drive)	
Waterloo	Woolwich	9.4	5.8	Regional Road 15 (King Street)	
Waterloo	Woolwich	9.8	6.1	Highway 85 ends Waterloo Regional Road 85 begins	Highway 85 northern terminus; former Highway 86 northern terminus (1998-2003); continues as Waterloo Regional Road 85
Waterloo	Woolwich	13.0	8.1	Regional Road 17 (Sawmill Road) – St. Jacobs, Conestogo	
Waterloo	Woolwich	17.0	10.6	Regional Road 21 north (Arthur Street) – Elmira	
Waterloo–Wellington boundary	Woolwich–Wellesley–Mapleton boundary	22.0	13.7	Waterloo Regional Road 85 ends Waterloo Regional Road 86 / Wellington County Road 86	Former Highway 85 northern terminus; former Highway 86 eastern terminus (1975-1980)
Waterloo–Wellington boundary	Wellesley–Mapleton boundary	29.8	18.5	Waterloo Regional Road 5 south – Linwood; Wellington County Road 12 north – Arthur	
Waterloo–Perth–Wellington boundary	Wellesley–Perth East–Mapleton boundary	35.3	21.9	Wellington County Road 11 north Waterloo Regional Road 86 ends Perth County Line 86 begins	Dorking; western end of Wellington County Road 86 / Waterloo Regional Road 86 concurrency; eastern end of Wellington County Road 86 / Perth County Line 86 concurrency
Perth–Wellington boundary	Perth East–Mapleton boundary	42.7	26.5	Perth County Road 131 south – Milverton	Formerly Highway 19 south
Perth–Wellington boundary	Perth East–Mapleton–North Perth boundary	46.4	28.8	Wellington County Road 9 north / Perth County Road 140 north Wellington County Road 86 ends	Western end of Wellington County Road 86 / Perth County Line 86 concurrency
Perth	North Perth (Listowel)	53.8	33.4	Highway 23 north (Wallace Avenue)	Former eastern end of Highway 23 concurrency
Perth	North Perth (Listowel)	54.9	34.1	Highway 23 south (Mitchell Road)	Former western end of Highway 23 concurrency
Perth–Huron boundary	North Perth–Huron East boundary	61.0	37.9	Road 172 Huron County Road 86 begins	Eastern end of Perth County Line 86 / Huron County Road 86 concurrency
Perth–Huron boundary	North Perth–Huron East–Howick boundary	67.1	41.7	Perth County Road 178 north / Huron County Road 34 north Perth County Line 86 ends	Western end of Perth County Line 86 / Huron County Road 86 concurrency
Huron	Morris-Turnberry	81.5	50.6	County Road 87 east (Harriston Road)	Bluevale; formerly Highway 87 east
Huron	North Huron–Morris-Turnberry boundary	88.0	54.7	County Road 4 (London Road / Josephine Street)	Wingham; formerly Highway 4
Huron–Bruce boundary	Morris-Turnberry–Huron-Kinloss boundary	94.5	58.7	Bruce County Road 86 begins	Eastern end of Huron County Road 86 / Bruce County Road 86 concurrency
Huron–Bruce boundary	Ashfield–Colborne–Wawanosh–Huron-Kinloss boundary	128.8	80.0	Highway 21 – Goderich, Kincardine Huron County Road 86 ends / Bruce County Road 86 ends	Amberley; former Highway 86 western terminus
1.000 mi = 1.609 km; 1.000 km = 0.621 mi: Closed/former; Incomplete access; Proposed; Route transition
