= Molesworth, Ontario =

Coordinates: 43.781472°N 81.07529°W

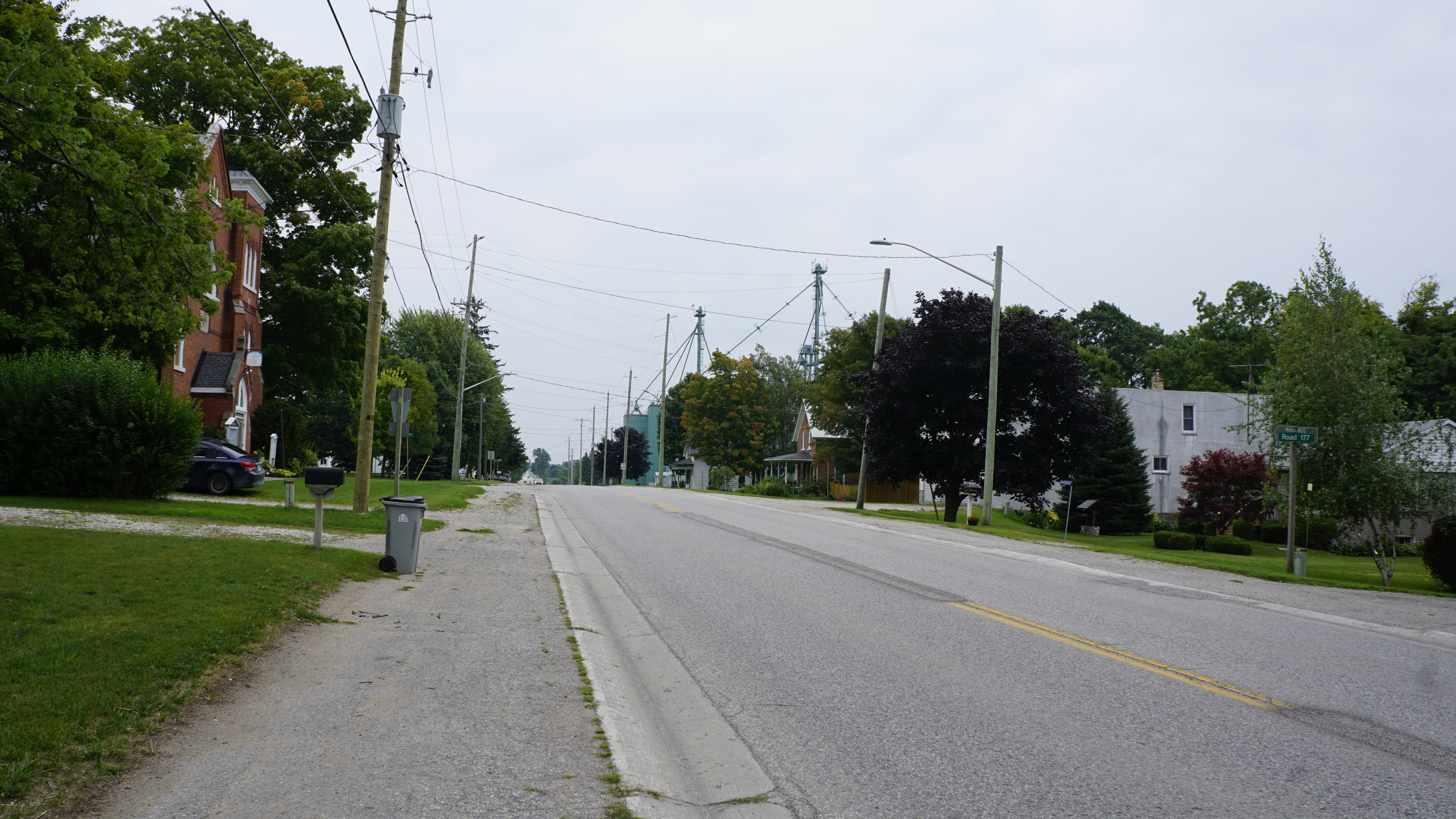
View from Line 86

Molesworth is a small community in the town of Huron East and North Perth, in Southwestern Ontario, Canada. Molesworth was founded in 1852 by John Mitchell and his family, who operated a general store that served the influx of settlers to the area. Mitchell also acted as a justice of the peace.

== Transportation ==
Molesworth is located at the junction of County Road 86 and County Road 19.

It is no longer served by a scheduled bus service to Wingham and Stratford.
