= Howick, Ontario =

Howick
- Township (lower-tier)
- Township of Howick
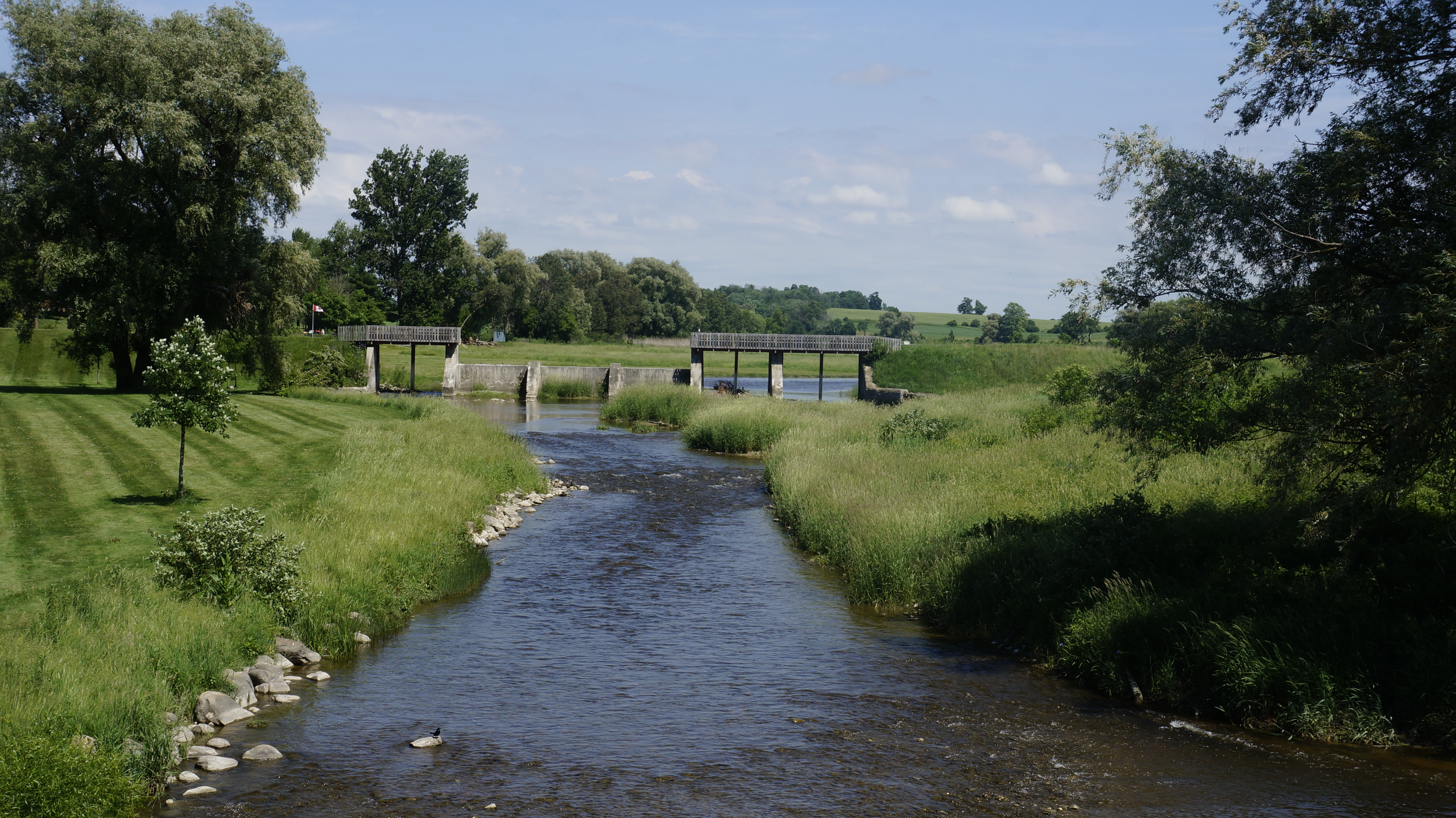
- Gorrie Conservation Area

- Location within Southern Ontario
- Coordinates: 43°54′N 81°04′W
- Country: Canada
- Province: Ontario
- County: Huron
- Settled: 1851
- Incorporated: 1856

Government
  - Reeve: Doug Harding
  - Fed. riding: Huron—Bruce
  - Prov. riding: Huron—Bruce

Area
  - Land: 286.55 km^{2} (110.64 sq mi)

Population (2021)
  - Total: 4,045
  - Density: 14.1/km^{2} (37/sq mi)
- Time zone: UTC-5 (EST)
  - Summer (DST): UTC-4 (EDT)
- Postal Code: N0G
- Area codes: 519, 226, 548
- Website: www.howick.ca

The Township of Howick is a municipality in Huron County, Ontario, Canada. It is located in the northeast corner of Huron County near the Bruce County border, east of Wingham, and named after Viscount Howick.

Its largest communities are Fordwich, Gorrie, and Wroxeter. Smaller hamlets include Belmore and Lakelet. Rural areas comprise the remainder of the township. The township's municipal offices, road works facility, public school, arena and library are located between Fordwich and Gorrie on Huron Road 87 (formerly Ontario Highway 87).

== History ==
Although Howick Township was one of the four Huron County Townships created out of the Queen's Bush by the Wilkinson survey of 1847, the first settler did not arrive until 1851, and the next in 1853. The township was named after George Grey who entered Parliament in 1829 as Lord Howick, taking the name from Howick Hall, his family's estate in England.

In 1854, the lots in the township were put up for sale, resulting in a wave of settlement. During a series of municipal amalgamations in Ontario through the 1990s and ending in 2001, the Township of Howick boundaries remained unchanged. The Township celebrated its 150th anniversary in 2006.

== Demographics ==
In the 2021 Census of Population conducted by Statistics Canada, Howick had a population of 4,045 living in 1,343 of its 1,414 total private dwellings, a change of 4.4% from its 2016 population of 3,873. With a land area of 286.55 km^{2} (110.64 sq mi), it had a population density of 14.1/km^{2} (36.6/sq mi) in 2021.

Historical census populations – Howick, Ontario

Year	Pop.	±%
1871	5,417	—
1881	5,616	+3.7%
1891	4,439	−21.0%
1901	4,140	−6.7%
1911	3,463	−16.4%
1921	3,065	−11.5%
1931	3,130	+2.1%
1941	2,979	−4.8%

Year	Pop.	±%
1951	2,859	−4.0%
1956	2,810	−1.7%
1961	2,758	−1.9%
1966	2,811	+1.9%
1971	3,001	+6.8%
1976	3,145	+4.8%
1981	3,072	−2.3%
1986	3,037	−1.1%

Year	Pop.	±%
1991	3,461	+14.0%
1996	3,685	+6.5%
2001	3,779	+2.6%
2006	3,882	+2.7%
2011	3,856	−0.7%
2016	3,873	+0.4%
2021	4,045	+4.4%

Source: Statistics Canada

== Transportation ==
A very small distance of Highway 9 travels through the extreme northeast corner of Howick Township. Otherwise, no provincial highways serve the township.

Huron Road 86 (formerly Highway 86) travels along the southern border of Howick.

Gorrie and Wroxeter are located on Huron Road 87 (formerly Highway 87), a significant east–west route through Howick. Fordwich is on Huron Road 30, a short distance from Huron Road 87.

Huron Road 12 on the western end of Howick serves Wroxeter and Belmore.

The remaining county roads in Howick are Huron Road 7 (east–west, through Lakelet) and Huron Road 28 (north–south, through Gorrie).

== See also ==
- List of townships in Ontario
