= List of numbered roads in Huron County =

List of county roads

The following is a list of county roads in Huron County, Ontario.

County Road #	Terminuses
Huron County Road 1	From Highway 8 at Benmiller to Bruce County Rd. 86 at Lucknow.
Huron County Road 2	From County Rd. 5 at Mount Carmel to County Rd. 84 in Zurich.
Huron County Road 3	From County Rd. 12 at Egmondville to Ontario Hwy 21 near Bayfield.
Huron County Road 4	From Ontario Hwy 4 to Bruce County 4 near Wingham. Formerly section of Ontario Highway 4
Huron County Road 5	From Ontario Hwy 4 at Centralia to Lambton County.
Huron County Road 6	From Ontario Hwy 23 at Kirkton to Ontario Hwy 4 near Exeter.
Huron County Road 7	From County Rd. 4 north of Wingham to County Rd. 30 west of Lakelet
Huron County Road 8	From County Rd. 4 in Clinton to County Rd. 25 in Auburn
Huron County Road 10	From County Rd. 81 to Highway 4
Huron County Road 11	From Perth County Rd. 180 to Ontario, Whalen Corners
Huron County Road 12	From Ontario Hwy 4 at Kippen to Bruce County Rd. 12.
Huron County Road 13	From Highway 21 to Clinton
Huron County Road 14	From County Rd. 25 to Highway 8 at Dublin. Also called Perth County Rd. 180
Huron County Road 15	From County Rd. 31 to Highway 8
Huron County Road 16	From County Rd. 4 near Belgrave to Perth County Rd. 72
Huron County Road 17	From County Rd. 15 to Perth County Rd. 44
Huron County Road 18	Highway 21 to Highway 8 at Holmesville
Huron County Road 19	From Molesworth to County Rd. 25
Huron County Road 20	From Highway 21 near Kintail to County Rd. 4 Belgrave
Huron County Road 22	From Bruce County Rd. 86 near Whitechurch to Auburn
Huron County Road 25	From Highway 21 near Goderich to Perth County Rd. 55
Huron County Road 28	From Bruce County Rd. 28 to County Rd. 87 and from County Rd. 87 at Gorrie to County Rd. 34
Huron County Road 30	From near Clifford to County Rd. 34
Huron County Road 31	From County Rd. 84 to Ontario Hwy 21 near Saltford.
Huron County Road 32	From County Rd. 12 to Perth County Road 24
Huron County Road 34	From County Rd. 86 to Perth County Rd. 4
Huron County Road 35	From County Rd. 30 near Clifford to Grey County Rd. 10; cosigned with Wellington County Rd. 1.
Huron County Road 81	From Highway 21 at Grand Bend to County Rd. 5
Huron County Road 83	From Highway 21 north of Grand Bend to Perth County Rd. 83
Huron County Road 84	From Highway 21 in Saint Joseph to Highway 4 in Hensall
Huron County Road 86	From Ontario Hwy 21 at Amberley to Perth County Road 86; cosigned Bruce County Road 86. Formerly section of Ontario Highway 86.
Huron County Road 87	From County Road 86 to Perth County Road 87. Formerly section of Ontario Highway 87.

== See also ==
- List of York Regional Roads
- List of Simcoe County Roads
