= Holmesville, Ontario =

Coordinates: 43.646700°N 81.60144°W

Holmesville is a community in the Canadian province of Ontario, in the township of Central Huron, fourteen kilometres southeast of Goderich. Founded in 1832 by two Irish Canadian immigrants named Samuel and John Holmes, the community was first called Holmes Hill and Holmes Villa before receiving its current name of Holmesville in 1855. It has a population of approximately 910 people. (2017)
