= Harriston, Ontario =

Harriston
- Unincorporated community
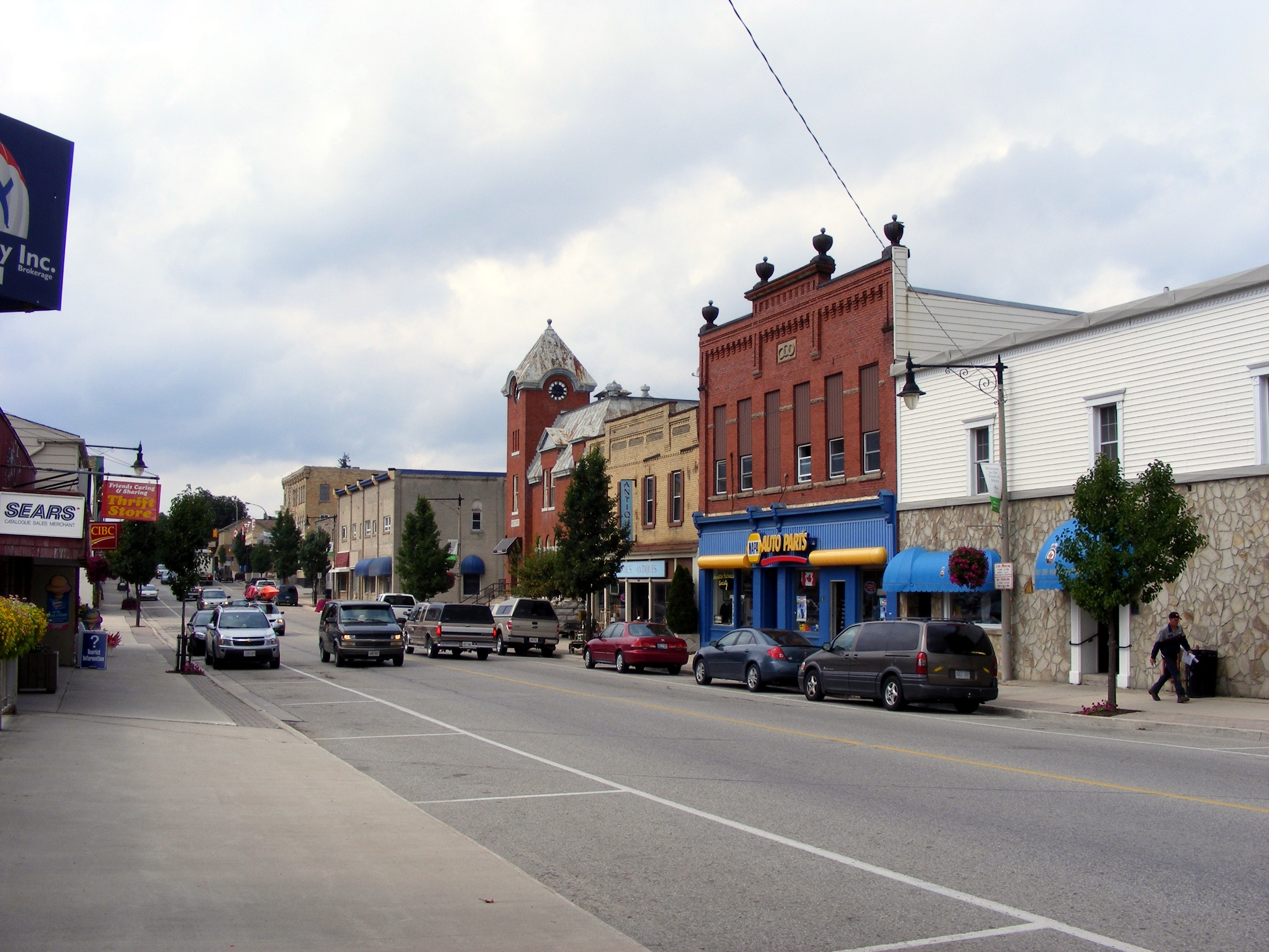
- Elora Street in Harriston
- Interactive map of Harriston
- Coordinates: 43°54′43″N 80°52′13″W
- Country: Canada
- Province: Ontario
- County: Wellington County
- Town: Minto
- Time zone: UTC-5 (EST)
  - Summer (DST): UTC-4 (EDT)
- Forward sortation area: N0G 1Z0
- Area codes: 519 and 226
- NTS Map: 040P15
- GNBC Code: FBMCB

Harriston (population 1,797) is a community in the Town of Minto in Wellington County, Ontario, Canada. In 1999, Harriston was amalgamated with the communities of Palmerston, Clifford, and Minto Township to form the Town of Minto. Harriston is located at the headwaters of the Maitland River, and has several shops, restaurants, a library, an art gallery and cultural centre.

== History ==
In the summer of 1845, the first non-Aboriginal settlers arrived in the area. The Crown did not make land available for sale in the region until 1854.

The town was named after Archibald Harrison, a Toronto farmer who was granted land along the Maitland River in Minto Township, at the Elora and Saugeen Road in 1854. Harrison's brother George Harrison built the first sawmill in 1854, and in 1856 his brother Joshua Harrison built the first gristmill, and also had the first store in the village of Harriston. The Harrisons had considerable wealth when they moved to the community from York County, and became leading men in the pioneer settlement. The population was only 150 but there were businesses including a blacksmith and wagon maker when a post office was established in 1856.

Archibald Harrison was the first postmaster; he also built the first hotel, and was also the first Reeve of Minto. He gave the land for Knox Church and cemetery, also land for the first school. The southern road leading to Harriston was gravelled in 1861, opening easier access to the larger markets of Guelph, Hamilton, and Toronto. The community became a prosperous commercial and farm-implement manufacturing centre following the construction of the Wellington, Grey and Bruce Railway, completed to Harriston in 1871. A telegraph link to the community followed soon thereafter. By 1872, when the village was incorporated, the population was 500. It became a Town in 1878. A second rail line (the Toronto, Grey and Bruce Railway) intersected the village in 1873. In 1882, the Grand Trunk Railway began shipping through Harriston.

In 1874, Harriston hosted a significant political rally, attended by approximately 1,000 people. Speakers included the provincial Premier, Oliver Mowat, and R.H. Taylor, secretary of the English National Agricultural Labourers Union.

A Carnegie Library opened in Harriston in 1908, designed by architect William Edward Binning.

Economic downturn and demographic changes caused significant hardship for the town during the 1970s. In September 1981, the Toronto Star featured a front page article entitled, "The Slow Death of a Town named Harriston." The article's author, Fran Macgregor, notes, "Harriston used to have three grocery stores. Now there are two." As of the early 2000s, there was only one grocery store. From the mid-2000s to 2014, the settlement did not have a gas station.

In 1995, the Progressive Conservative government of Ontario began to reduce the number of total municipalities in the province. On January 1, 1999, the Town of Minto was created through the amalgamation of the towns of Harriston, Palmerston, the former village of Clifford, and the surrounding rural area of the former Minto Township.

== Demographics ==
Population history of Harriston
Year	Pop.	±%
1881	1,772	—
1891	1,687	−4.8%
1901	1,637	−3.0%
1911	1,491	−8.9%
1921	1,263	−15.3%
1931	1,296	+2.6%
1941	1,305	+0.7%
1951	1,494	+14.5%
1956	1,592	+6.6%
1961	1,631	+2.4%
1966	1,748	+7.2%
1971	1,785	+2.1%
1976	1,872	+4.9%
1981	1,775	−5.2%
1986	1,993	+12.3%
1991	1,995	+0.1%
1996	2,008	+0.7%
2001	2,031	+1.1%
2006	2,108	+3.8%
2011	1,981	−6.0%
2016	1,797	−9.3%
2021	1,887	+5.0%

As of the 2021 Canadian Census, Harriston's population was 1,887. This represents an increase of 90 people, or 5.0%, compared to the 2016 Canadian Census.

Harriston did not appear in the first Canadian census in 1871.

Harriston's population was 1,772 in 1881, however, the population in the community decreased steadily, reaching a low point of 1,263 in 1921.

In 1996, Harriston's population was over 2,000 for the first time. The population of the community peaked to 2,108 people in 2006, however, by 2016, the population decreased to 1,797. In 2021, Harriston's population increased to 1,887.

As of the latest census in 2021, the median age in Harriston is 40.4 years old. There are 732 private dwellings in Harriston, with 702 of them occupied by usual residents.

The median total income for a household in Harriston was $81,000 in 2020.

== Civil society ==
Beginning in the late 1860s, Harriston's citizens began to create friendly service organizations parallel to, as well as outside, of religious groups. In 1868, the Loyal Orange Institution (Orange Order) opened a Harriston Lodge (#1152). In 1871, the Ancient, Free & Accepted Masons (commonly known as Freemasons) established a Lodge (#262). Other groups followed, such as the Independent Order of Oddfellows (1879), as well as the Independent Order of Good Templars (active by 1874) and the Royal Templars of Temperance (active by 1900). The Harriston Minto Agricultural Society was founded in 1859 and continues to operate an annual fall fair on the third weekend in September.

== Culture ==
=== The Crown Harriston ===
The Crown Harriston was built in 1949 as a cinema and is located on Elora Street. In 2016, it became a cultural centre.

The venue features regular screenings of movies, hosts live music, spectacle shows and entertainment events. The Crown Harriston is available for public, corporate and private events and activities.

=== Harriston Town Hall Theatre ===
The Harriston Town Hall Theatre is located on Elora Street and is home of the Grey Wellington Theatre Guild and the Minto Dance Academy. The theatre building has professional-quality lighting, sound and staging facilities.

=== Minto Arts Council's Gallery ===
Located on the third floor of the Harriston Carnegie Library on Mill Street. The gallery showcases local and distant artistic talent collections.

=== Outdoor attractions ===
- Harriston Greenway Trail: runs along the Maitland River throughout the community.
- Harriston Kinsmen Pool: it is open seasonally from June - August and offers a swim program for all ages.
- Harriston-Minto Community Complex: includes the Harriston Ball Diamond.
- Tannery Park: lies overtop of the Maitland River, features include historic murals, flower beds, and a grass-lined path.

=== Festivals ===
- Harriston-Minto Fall Fair: held annually on the second weekend in September. Includes different competitions, events and a Soap Box Derby.
- Santa Claus Parade: held in November, it includes floats, music and an appearance from Santa Claus.

== Education ==
=== Upper Grand District School Board ===
Harriston is served by the Upper Grand District School Board as Minto-Clifford Public School is a K-8 school located on Highway 89. Elementary students in the community who are in the French Immersion program are bussed to Palmerston Public School in Palmerston.

Norwell District Secondary School, located in Palmerston, is the local high school for students who live in Harriston and are bussed to this school.

=== Wellington Catholic District School Board ===
Harriston is served by the Wellington Catholic District School Board, as local K-8 students are bussed to St. Mary Catholic Elementary School in Mount Forest.

Local high school students in the WCDSB are bussed to Saint James Catholic High School in Guelph.

== Fire and Emergency services ==
- Ambulance: Ambulance service in Harriston is provided by the Guelph-Wellington Paramedic Service. The headquarters for GWPS is located in Guelph. Harriston has one station located within the community.
- Fire services: Residents of Harriston are served by the Minto Fire Department. The fire department is a volunteer fire service, with approximately 85 volunteer fire fighters. Harriston has a fire station located within the community, Fire Station 11.
- Police: The Ontario Provincial Police provides service for Harriston. There isn't an operation centre located within the community. The OPP operation centre that serves Harriston is the North Wellington Operations Centre located in Teviotdale.

== Health care ==
Harriston does not have a hospital located within the community. The closest hospital to Harriston is the Palmerston and District Hospital located in Palmerston. Other hospitals nearby are Groves Community Hospital in Fergus and Louise Marshall Hospital in Mount Forest. These hospitals are a part of the Wellington Health Care Alliance.

== Media ==
- Print media: local print media coverage in Harriston is provided by the Wellington Advertiser, which is a local newspaper based out of Fergus.
- Radio: local radio coverage in Harriston is provided by 88.7 The River (CIWN-FM) from nearby Mount Forest and The Grand 101 FM (CICW-FM), which is based out of Fergus. Stations from Guelph and the Region of Waterloo also provide coverage.
- Television: CTV Kitchener (CKCO-DT) provides local news for Harriston.

== Public library system ==
The Wellington County Library system consists of 14 branches throughout the county, including one in Harriston on Mill Street.

== Sports ==
=== Harriston Arena and Community Complex ===
The Harriston Arena and Community Complex features an arena with an ice/floor surface for ice hockey, broomball, figure skating and public skating, as well as an auditorium.

- Auditorium: the auditorium has a capacity of 299 and is used for weddings, family reunions, special occasions, meetings, presentations and select sporting events.
- Arena floor: the arena has a capacity of 1,082 and is used for large functions, banquets, galas and indoor sporting events. The arena is used occasionally as home games for the Minto 81's of the Ontario Elite Hockey League.

==== Harriston Curling Club ====
Curling in Harriston began in 1875 on ponds and rivers. The current curling club opened in 1976 at the arena complex which features four ice sheets. Multiple bonspiels are held at the curling club and various leagues of all ages make use of the facility.

==== Harriston ball diamond ====
The Harriston ball diamond is located at the Harriston Arena and Community Complex. It features dugouts, a fenced ball diamond with a backstop, and lights.

==== Harriston pavilion ====
The Harriston pavilion is located next to the Arena and Community Complex and the ball diamond. This is a location that is used by residents for large outdoor events in the area.

=== Harriston Kinsmen Pool ===
The Harriston Kinsmen Pool runs seasonally from June - August. A swim program is offered by the community that offers swimming lessons, as well as public swims, aquafit and lane swims.

== Notable people ==
=== Athletes ===
- Dayna Deruelle (1982 – ), curler who competes on the World Curling Tour.
- Monty Gordon (1932 – 2019), bobsledder who competed at the 1964 Winter Olympics.
- Claude C. Robinson (1881 – 1976), ice hockey player and sports executive; inducted into the Hockey Hall of Fame in 1945.
- Brent Ross (1970 – ), curler who competes on the World Curling Tour.

=== Authors ===
- Mabel Dunham (1881 – 1957), author of several historical fiction books and the first trained librarian in the province of Ontario to hold the position of Chief Librarian.

=== Business people ===
- James Henry Gundy (1880 – 1951), co-founder of Wood Gundy and Company.

=== Doctors ===
- John G. FitzGerald (1882 – 1940), founder of the Connaught Laboratories and the University of Toronto School of Hygiene in 1927, served as Dean of Medicine at University of Toronto from 1932 – 1936.

=== Musicians ===
- Shirley Eikhard (1955 – 2022), singer-songwriter most notably the writer of "Something to Talk About" by Bonnie Raitt in 1991.

=== Politicians ===
- William Clarke Chambers (1862 – 1958), member of the Legislative Assembly of Ontario from 1911 – 1926.
- Robert Edwin Clapp (1855 – 1944), member of the Legislative Assembly of Ontario from 1905 – 1908.
- James Cowan, (1831 – 1910), member of the Legislative Assembly of Manitoba from 1874 – 1881.
- Hugh Elliott Eaglesham (1873 – 1938), member of the Legislative Assembly of Saskatchewan from 1934 – 1938.
- John Landeryou (1905 – 1982), member of the House of Commons of Canada from 1935 – 1940 and member of the Legislative Assembly of Alberta from 1944 – 1971.
- Andrew James Macauley (1887 – 1939), member of the Legislative Assembly of Saskatchewan from 1934 – 1938.
- William Melville Martin (1876 – 1970), second Premier of Saskatchewan from 1916 – 1922.
- George McLeod (1896 – 1965), member of the House of Commons of Canada from 1953 – 1958 and the Legislative Assembly of British Columbia from 1963 – 1965.
- George McQuibban (1886 – 1937), member of the Legislative Assembly of Ontario from 1926 – 1937.
- Matthew Rae (1990 – ), member of the Legislative Assembly of Ontario since 2022.
