= Morris-Turnberry =

- Municipality (lower-tier)
- Municipality of Morris-Turnberry
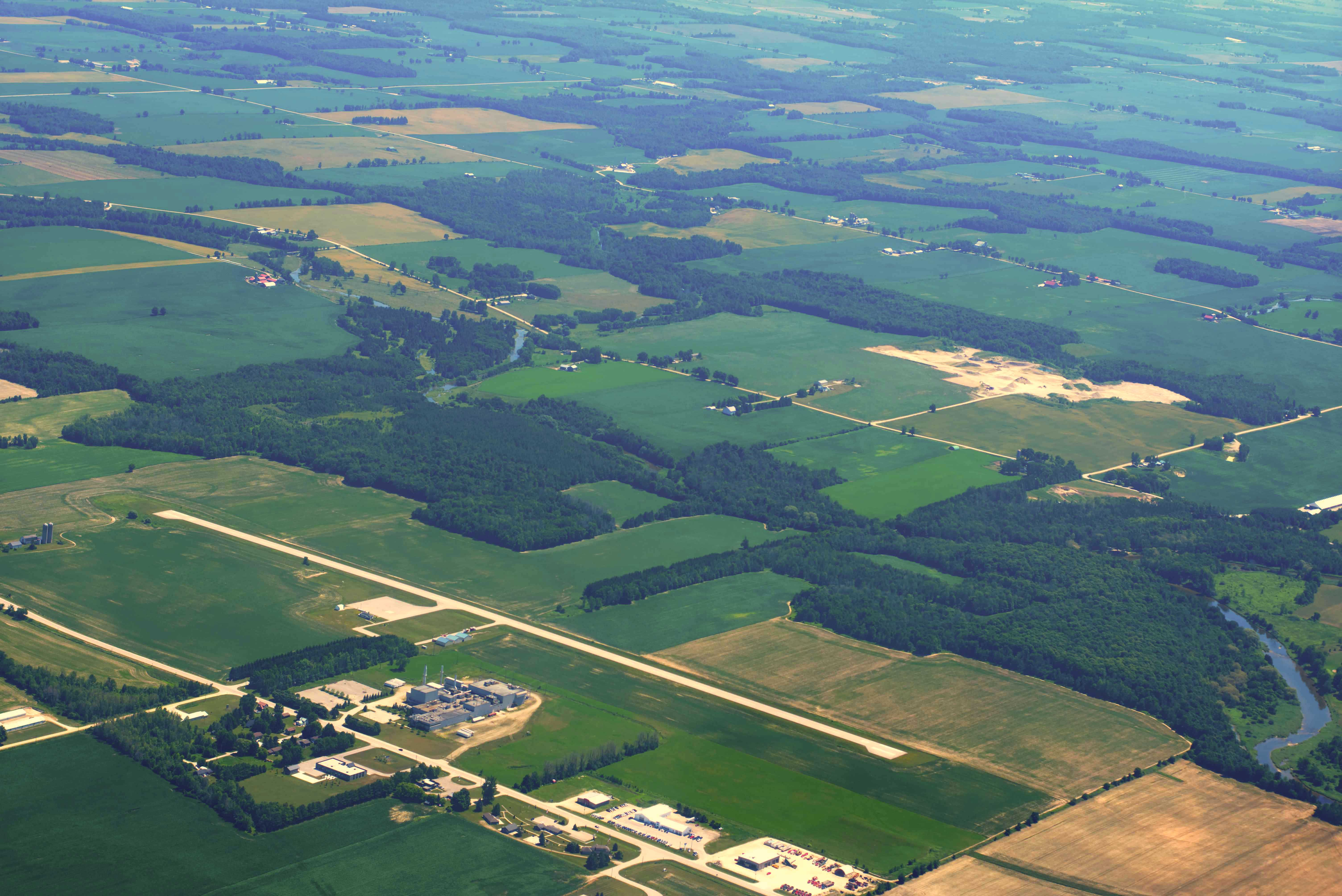
- Aerial view near Wingham Airport

- Location in southern Ontario
- Coordinates: 43°49′30″N 81°16′20″W
- Country: Canada
- Province: Ontario
- County: Huron
- Formed: January 1, 2001

Government
  - Mayor: Jamie Heffer
  - Fed. riding: Huron—Bruce
  - Prov. riding: Huron—Bruce

Area
  - Land: 376.89 km^{2} (145.52 sq mi)

Population (2021)
  - Total: 3,590
  - Density: 9.5/km^{2} (25/sq mi)
- Time zone: UTC-5 (EST)
  - Summer (DST): UTC-4 (EDT)
- Postal Code: N0G/N0K
- Area codes: 519, 226
- Website: morristurnberry.ca

Morris-Turnberry is a municipality in Huron County, Ontario, Canada. It is located in the north portion of Huron County, near the Bruce County border, southeast of Wingham.

It was formed as an amalgamation of the former Morris and Turnberry townships on January 1, 2001, in an Ontario-wide local government restructuring imposed by the government of that time. The two former townships now comprise the wards of the amalgamated municipality.

Morris-Turnberry's only significant settlement is Bluevale, located at the junction of Huron Roads 86 and 87 east of Wingham. This is where Elias Disney, father of Walt Disney, was born in 1859. The community of Sunshine is also located there.

== Demographics ==
In the 2021 Census of Population conducted by Statistics Canada, Morris-Turnberry had a population of 3,590 living in 1,195 of its 1,283 total private dwellings, a change of 2.7% from its 2016 population of 3,496. With a land area of 376.89 km^{2} (145.52 sq mi), it had a population density of 9.5/km^{2} (24.7/sq mi) in 2021.

Historical census populations – Morris-Turnberry
Year	Pop.	±%
1996	3,504	—
2001	3,413	−2.6%
2006	3,496	+2.4%
2011	3,413	−2.4%
2016	3,496	+2.4%
2021	3,590	+2.7%
Source: Statistics Canada

Prior to amalgamation (2001):

- Population total in 1996: 3,504
  - Morris (township): 1,732
  - Turnberry (township): 1,772
- Population in 1991:
  - Morris (township): 1,725
  - Turnberry (township): 1,582

== See also ==
- List of townships in Ontario
