= 2014 Dufferin County municipal elections =

Local election in Ontario, Canada

Elections were held in Dufferin County, Ontario on October 27, 2014 in conjunction with municipal elections across the province.

== Dufferin County Council ==
Dufferin County Council has 14 members, two from each constituent municipality except for East Garafraxa and East Luther Grand Valley which elect just one member.

Position	Elected
Amaranth Mayor	Don MacIver
Amaranth Deputy Mayor	Jane Aultman (acclaimed)
East Garafraxa Mayor	Guy Gardhouse (acclaimed)
Grand Valley Mayor	Steve Soloman
Melancthon Mayor	Darren White
Melancthon Deputy Mayor	Janice Elliott (acclaimed)
Mono Mayor	Laura Ryan (acclaimed)
Mono Deputy Mayor	Ken McGhee
Mulmur Mayor	Paul Mills (acclaimed)
Mulmur Deputy Mayor	Heather Hayes (acclaimed)
Orangeville Mayor	Jeremy Williams
Orangeville Deputy Mayor	Warren Maycock
Shelburne Mayor	Kenneth Bennington
Shelburne Deputy Mayor	Geoff Dunlop (acclaimed)

== Amaranth ==
Mayoral Candidate	Vote	%
Don McIver (X)	434	53.32
Walter Kolodziechuk	380	46.68

== East Garafraxa ==
Mayoral Candidate	Vote	%
Guy Gardhouse	Acclaimed	

== Grand Valley ==
Mayoral Candidate	Vote	%
Steve Soloman	807	82.43
John K. Oosterhof (X)	131	13.38
Denis Houle	41	4.19

== Melancthon ==
Mayoral Candidate	Vote	%
Darren White	470	54.78
David Thwaites	388	45.22

== Mono ==
Mayoral Candidate	Vote	%
Laura Ryan (X)	Acclaimed	

== Mulmur ==
Mayoral Candidate	Vote	%
Paul Mills (X)	Acclaimed	

== Orangeville ==
Mayoral Candidate	Vote	%
Jeremy Williams	3,940	52.84
Rob Adams (X)	3,517	47.16

== Shelburne ==
Mayoral Candidate	Vote	%
Kenneth Bennington	1,128	81.33
Frank Hunt, Jr.	259	18.67
