= List of numbered roads in Dufferin County =

List of county roads

This page lists all of the numbered county roads in Dufferin County, Ontario.

| Number | Names | Western/Southern Terminus | Eastern/Northern Terminus | Major Communities | Comments |
|---|---|---|---|---|---|
| 2 | 4th Line N.E. (Melancthon) | CR 9 | Melancthon-Artemesia (Grey County) Townline | | Passes through the very hilly "Roof of Ontario" tourist region. Continues north as Grey CR 2 to Maxwell and Thornbury. Prior to 1989, CR 2 was CR 10. |
| 3 | Orangeville-Fergus Road; 5th Sideroad (East Garafraxa) | East Garafraxa-West Garafraxa (Wellington County) Townline at Craigsholme | CR 109, just west of Orangeville | Orangeville | Continues west as Wellington CR 18 to Fergus. |
| 5 | Belwood Road; 9th Line (East Garafraxa); 15 Sideroad (East Garafraxa); 12th Line (East Garafraxa) | East Garafraxa-West Garafraxa (Wellington County) Townline | CR 109 just south of Grand Valley | None | Continues west as Wellington CR 19 to Belwood and Fergus. |
| 6 | Mill Street, 10th Line (Amaranth) | CR 109 | Station Street | Waldemar | Was downloaded to Amaranth in the 2000s. The 2006 Revision of the Dufferin County Map Book does not list this road. |
| 7 | Hockley Road | Intersection of CR 16 and Highway 10 in Biggles, 4 km (2.5 mi) north of Orangeville | Mono-Adjala (Simcoe County) Townline in Hockley. | Glen Cross, Hockley, Orangeville (skirts it to the north) | Travels through the Hockley Valley, and passes the Hockley Valley Ski Resort and Cedar Highlands Ski Resort. Continues east as Simcoe CR 1 to Loretto and Beeton, and west as Dufferin CR 16. |
| 8 | Mono Centre Road; 15th Sideroad (Mono); 2nd Line E.H.S. (Mono); 18th Sideroad (Mono); 3rd Line E.H.S. (Mono); 20th Sideroad (Mono) | Highway 10 in Camilla | CR 18, just east of Relessey | Mono Centre (Town of Mono) | |
| 9 | 230 Sideroad (Melancthon) | Highway 10 and Grey CR 9, just east of Dundalk | Grey CR 9 (Melancthon-Osprey Townline) | | Connects two segments of Grey CR 9. It separates lots 230 and 231 of the new survey of Melancthon (hence 230 Sideroad). Prior to 1989, it was Dufferin CR 23. |
| 10 | Concession Road 4-5 (East Luther); Amaranth-East Luther Townline; 10th Sideroad (Amaranth); 10th Sideroad (Mono) | CR 25, north of Grand Valley | Highway 10, just west of Cardwell | Laurel, Bowling Green | Prior to 1989, this was Dufferin CR 9. |
| 11 | "A" Line (East Garafraxa); 3rd Line (Amaranth); 30th Sideroad (Amaranth); 2nd Line (Amaranth) | CR 3 just west of Orangeville | Intersection of Highway 10/Highway 89 and CR 124 1 km (0.62 mi) east of Shelburne | Orangeville, Shelburne | The 30th Sideroad segment is called Warriors Way. |
| 12 | 5th Line (Amaranth) | CR 109 | Highway 89, 2 km west of Shelburne | Laurel | |
| 15 | Concession Road 10-11 (East Luther) | East Luther-West Luther (Wellington County) Townline | CR 25 | Monticello | Passes by the Luther Marsh Wildlife Management Area. Continues west as Wellington CR 15. |
| 16 | Orangeville-Amaranth Townline Mono-Amaranth Townline 5 Sideroad (Mono) | CR 109 | Intersection of Highway 10 and CR 7 in Biggles | Orangeville, Biggles | When CR 109 was rerouted onto Riddell Road in 2005, the segment of CR 109 between Riddell Road and CR 16 was redesignated CR 16. |
| 17 | 290 Sideroad (Melancthon); 5th Line O.S. (Melancthon); 10th Sideroad (Melancthon); 10th Sideroad (Mulmur) | Highway 89 in Jessopville | Mulmur-Tosorontio (Simcoe County) Townline | Melancthon | The segment between CR 19 and CR 18 was downloaded to Mulmur Township sometime in the 2000s; the Dufferin County Map Book calls this segment 10th Sideroad. CR 17 is the only Dufferin CR that is not continuous. Continues east as Simcoe CR 5 to Everett. |
| 18 | Airport Road; 6th Line E.H.S. (Mono); 6th Line East (Mulmur) | Highway 9 in Mono Mills | Mulmur-Nottawasaga (Simcoe County) Townline in Banda, Ontario | Mono Mills, Mansfield | CR18 is part of the much longer Airport Road, which is named after Toronto Pearson International Airport, from where it begins and is a popular route between the Greater Toronto Area and the Georgian Triangle (GTA); continues south as Peel RR 7 and continues north as Simcoe CR 42 to Stayner (although the name does not officially continue into Simcoe). This road travels through a variety of settings, from suburban in the GTA, to small hamlets, rural farmland, and through the scenic Niagara Escarpment. |
| 19 | Prince of Wales Road | Intersection of Highway 10 and 89 in Primrose, 5 km east of Shelburne | CR 17 | Primrose | |
| 21 | 260 Sideroad (Melancthon); 5th Line O.S. (Melancthon); 25th Sideroad (Melancthon); 25th Sideroad (Mulmur) | Highway 10 at Corbetton | Mulmur-Tosorontio (Simcoe County). | Honeywood | Continues east as Simcoe CR 12 to Lisle and C.F.B. Borden |
| 23 | "B" Line (East Garafraxa), Orangeville-Caledon Townline | CR 3 (just south of CR 109) | Peel RM Road 136 (Porterfield Road) | Orangeville | |
| 24 | 14th Line (East Garafraxa) | East Garafraxa-Erin (Wellington County) Townline | CR 109 | Reading, Waldemar | Formerly part of Highway 25, turned back in 1997. Continues south as Wellington CR 24 to Hillsburgh. |
| 25 | Sideroad 30-31 (East Luther), Water Street, Main Street | CR 109 | Highway 89 | Grand Valley | Was part of Highway 25, turned back in 1997. |
| 109 | East Luther-East Garafraxa Townline; Amaranth-East Garafraxa Townline | East-West Luther Townline | Highway 10 south of Orangeville | | Formerly part of Highway 9. In 2005, was rerouted south of the town of Orangeville. It is the only Dufferin CR whose route includes a segment completely outside the county (in Peel RM). |
| 124 | 2nd Line Melancthon | Intersection of Highway 10/Highway 89 and CR 11 1 km (0.62 mi) east of Shelburne. | Melancthon-Osprey Townline and Melancthon-Nottawasaga Townline | Shelburne, Horning's Mills | Formerly part of Highway 24, until segments north of Cambridge were turned back in 1998. Has a small diversion/bypass around community of Horning's Mills. Continues north as Grey and Simcoe CR 124 to Singhampton. |
