= Centre Dufferin District High School =

Location
- 150 Fourth Avenue; Shelburne, Ontario, L9V 3R5; Canada; 44°4′55.8″N 80°12′30″W

Information
- School type: Public, High school
- Motto: Partners learning together, creating successful tomorrows
- School board: Upper Grand District School Board
- Principal: Damon Ealey
- Grades: 9–12
- Enrollment: 815 (2019/2020)
- Language: English; French
- Colours: Purple and Gold
- Team name: Royals
- Classification: AAA
- Website: www.ugdsb.ca/cddhs/

Built and opened 1954 with principal J. Charles Sawyers, Centre Dufferin District High School is the public high school for Shelburne, Ontario. It has a student population of approximately 850 and serves the towns and townships of Grand Valley, Amaranth, Melancthon, Mulmur, and Mono. It is part of the Upper Grand District School Board.

== History ==
High school in Shelburne has a rich history of over one hundred years. Yearbook articles give a glimpse into the culture at Shelburne High School at the dawn of the 20th century.

"The old home, surrounded by a fertile country, the soil well tilled by an intelligent and industrious population, and blessed with magnificent crops for years, is the thriving rural business center that you would expect it to be. Our modern methods of living and the complex social fabric of recent years has brought with it a sort of unsettledness of abode, and the personnel of our leading citizens and business men in many ways is subject to more frequent change than obtained in years gone by, but many of the old faces still remain."

The original Shelburne Highschool, the 'old school on the hill' was built in 1900, a few blocks south of Centre Dufferin's current location. In 1943, 50 of the school's 122 students moved to work on farms to contribute to the war effort. The school's motto read 'in hoc signo vincimus.' In 1994, the original school was torn down after sustaining fire damage.

In Centre Dufferin's early years it served grades 8 through 13, major renovations took place in 1975, which added a gymnasium and technology classrooms.

== Extra Curriculars and Athletics ==
Athletic teams, known as the Royals, include badminton, basketball, cross country running, curling, field hockey, football, rugby, golf, ice hockey, soccer, track and field, volleyball, and Nordic skiing. Centre Dufferin plays in the Central Western Ontario Secondary Schools Association (CWOSSA) in Districts 4 & 10.

Student groups include Athletic Council, Black Chapter, Breakfast Club, Gender Sexuality Alliance, Jack Chapter, Student Council, and Yearbook Committee, which strive to achieve their own respective goals within the school community and regularly plan and host events within it.

=== Notable Highlights ===
- Received the 2016-2017 Quality Daily Physical Education award with strong fitness programs
- Won the Government Of Canada History Award having created The Digital Historian Project
- Won the 2025 Ontario High School Chess Championship (intermediate team)

== See also ==
- Education in Ontario
- List of secondary schools in Ontario
