= Ontario Highway 89 =

Ontario provincial highway

Highway 89
- Highway 89 highlighted in red

Route information
- Maintained by Ministry of Transportation
- Length: 107.0 km (66.5 mi)
- Existed: 1937–present

Major junctions
- West end: Highway 9 / Highway 23 – Harriston
- Highway 6 – Mount Forest; Highway 10 – Shelburne
- East end: Highway 400 – Cookstown

Location
- Country: Canada
- Province: Ontario
- Counties: Dufferin, Grey, Simcoe, Wellington
- Towns: Alliston, Cookstown, Harriston, Mount Forest, Shelburne

Highway system
- Ontario provincial highways; Current; Former; 400-series
← Highway 85	→ Highway 93
Former provincial highways
← Highway 88	Highway 90 →

King's Highway 89, commonly referred to as Highway 89, is an east–west provincially maintained highway in the south central portion of the Canadian province of Ontario, stretching 107 kilometres (66 mi) from the junction of Highway 9 and Highway 23 in Harriston in the west, to Highway 400 just east of Cookstown in the east. The principal urban centres along the highway include Alliston, Shelburne and Mount Forest. Outside these towns, the highway travels through rural farmland across a large part of southwestern Ontario.

Highway 89 was established in 1937 as a result of the rerouting of Highway 9 between Orangeville and Highway 27. In 1963, the route was extended west to Palmerston and east to Highway 400. Plans were conceived during the late 1970s to push the highway further east to Highway 12 via Ravenshoe Road, resulting in a brief extension to Highway 11. However, environmental protest over the chosen route through the Holland Marsh resulted in the cancellation of plans in 1986. In 1997, the section between Highway 400 and Highway 11 was decommissioned. The most recent change to the route took place in 2003, when the section of Highway 89 between Palmerston and Harriston was renumbered as part of Highway 23, creating a shared terminus at a junction with Highway 9.

== Route description ==
The route forms the main streets of several of the small towns that dot the highway east to west, namely Cookstown, Alliston and Shelburne. The highway also forms the backbone of many small villages and hamlets between the larger centres, such as Conn, Keldon, Primrose, Violet Hill, Rosemont and Nicolston.

The highway formerly continued past its current eastern terminus at Highway 400 to Yonge Street, formerly Highway 11, in the hamlet of Fennell. This section is now numbered as Simcoe County Road 89. East of Fennel, the roadway continues as Simcoe County Road 3 / Shore Acres Drive. The highway also continued past its current western terminus in Harriston, taking the route to Palmerston that is now numbered as Highway 23.

The highway mostly runs through farmland and small communities, although the route does pass by Earl Rowe Provincial Park and the Honda car manufacturing plant in the Alliston area. Other parks and natural areas that are close to the route are Boyne Valley Provincial Park and Mono Cliffs Provincial Park, both of which are located on the Niagara Escarpment. Further west is the Luther Marsh Conservation Area, a vast wilderness area that surrounds Luther Lake.

== History ==
Highway 89 was created out of a highway rerouting in the late 1930s. Originally, it formed the routing of Highway 9, which until then turned north at Orangeville, travelling concurrently with Highway 10, then turning east to Cookstown. On February 10, 1937, Highway 9 was rerouted along its present course east of Orangeville. By 1938, Highway 89 was designated along the former route of Highway 9.

Highway 89 remained as-is until the early 1960s, when it was extended west to Palmerston and east to Highway 400. On April 1, 1963, the highway was assumed through the counties of Dufferin, Grey and Wellington. The section between Highway 27 and Highway 400 was assumed the following day.

During the mid-1970s, Highway 89 was extended east to Highway 11 at Fennell. This section was eventually returned to the jurisdiction of Simcoe County on April 1, 1997. During the spring of 2003, the MTO renumbered several highways to improve route continuity. Among these was the renumbering of a section of Highway 89 between Harriston and Palmerston. The result of this renumbering was a shared terminus between Highway 89 and Highway 23 at an intersection with Highway 9.

=== Extension to Highway 12 ===
During the late 1970s, plans arose to create a new highway link on the south side of Lake Simcoe to connect Highway 400 and Highway 12. The route for this extension was announced on June 30, 1978. It was to follow 11th Line from Highway 400 east to the Holland Marsh, where it would cross towards the northeast onto the alignment of Ravenshoe Road (York Road 32). The extension would traverse the length of Ravenshoe Road to Lakeridge Road (Durham Road 23), where it would zig-zag onto Concession Road 7 to end immediately north of Sunderland. However, heavy environmental protests ensued over the chosen route through the marsh. Consequently, then Transportation Minister Ed Fulton officially cancelled the extension on April 21, 1986. The proposal has since been reborn as the Bradford Bypass.

== Major intersections ==
The following table lists the major junctions along Highway 89, as noted by the Ministry of Transportation of Ontario.

Division	Location	km	mi	Destinations	Notes
Perth–Wellington boundary	West Perth–Minto boundary	−9.7	−6.0	Highway 23 west – Listowel; County Line 93 east / County Road 123 east – Palmerston	Former Highway 89 western terminus; formerly Highway 23 east; present-day Highway 23 east follows former Highway 89
Wellington	Minto	−1.6	−0.99	County Road 87 west (Harriston Road)	Formerly Highway 87 west
Wellington	Harriston	0.0	0.0	Highway 9 north / County Road 109 south (Elora Street) – Clifford, Teviotdale Highway 23 ends Highway 89 begins	Highway 89 western terminus; present-day Highway 23 northern terminus; beginning of Harriston Connecting Link agreement
Wellington	Harriston	0.5	0.31		End of Harriston Connecting Link agreement
Wellington	Minto	5.3	3.3	County Road 2 west – Clifford	
Grey–Wellington boundary	West Grey–Minto–Wellington North boundary	13.8	8.6	Grey County Road 6 north Wellington County Road 6 south	
Wellington	Wellington North (Mount Forest)	15.1	9.4	Sligo Road / Lovers Lane	Beginning of Mount Forest Connecting Link agreement
Wellington	Wellington North (Mount Forest)	16.9	10.5	Highway 6 (Main Street) – Guelph, Owen Sound	
Wellington	Wellington North (Mount Forest)	18.2	11.3		End of Mount Forest Connecting Link agreement
Grey–Wellington boundary	Southgate–Wellington North boundary	30.2	18.8	Grey County Road 14 north – Flesherton; Wellington County Road 14 south – Arthur	Conn
Grey–Wellington boundary	Southgate–Wellington North boundary	35.6	22.1	County Road 16 south	
Grey–Dufferin boundary	Southgate–Grand Valley boundary	44.3	27.5	County Road 8 north	Keldon
Dufferin	Melancthon–Grand Valley boundary	47.9	29.8	County Road 25 south – Grand Valley	Formerly Highway 25 south
Dufferin	Melancthon–Amaranth boundary	50.7	31.5	County Road 17 east	
Dufferin	Melancthon–Amaranth boundary	58.1	36.1	County Road 12 south	
Dufferin	Shelburne	59.7	37.1		Beginning of Shelburne Connecting Link agreement
Dufferin	Shelburne	61.3	38.1	Highway 10 north – Owen Sound	Western end of Highway 10 concurrency
Dufferin	Shelburne	62.7	39.0	County Road 124 north – Collingwood; County Road 11 south (2nd Line)	Formerly Highway 24 north; former western end of Highway 24 concurrency
Dufferin	Shelburne	66.2	41.1	Highway 10 south – Orangeville	Eastern end of Highway 10 / former Highway 24 concurrency; end of Shelburne Connecting Link agreement
Dufferin	Mulmur–Mono boundary	75.7	47.0	County Road 18 (Airport Road)	
Simcoe	Adjala-Tosorontio	83.3	51.8	County Road 13 north – Everett	
Simcoe	Adjala-Tosorontio	84.5	52.5	County Road 50 south – Bolton	Formerly Highway 50 south
Simcoe	New Tecumseth (Alliston)	86.8	53.9	Industrial Parkway	Beginning of Alliston Connecting Link agreement
Simcoe	New Tecumseth (Alliston)	87.8	54.6	County Road 15 north (King Street)	
Simcoe	New Tecumseth (Alliston)	91.9	57.1	County Road 10 (Addison Road / Industrial Parkway)	End of Alliston Connecting Link agreement
Simcoe	Essa–New Tecumseth boundary	96.2	59.8	County Road 56 north	
Simcoe	Innisfil (Cookstown)	101.9	63.3		Beginning of Cookstown Connecting Link agreement
Simcoe	Innisfil (Cookstown)	102.5	63.7	County Road 27 (King Street)	Formerly Highway 27
Simcoe	Innisfil (Cookstown)	103.2	64.1		End of Cookstown Connecting Link agreement
Simcoe	Innisfil	106.1	65.9	County Road 53 (5th Sideroad)	
Simcoe	Innisfil	107.0	66.5	Highway 400 – Toronto, Barrie Highway 89 ends Simcoe County Road 89 begins	Highway 400 exit 75; Highway 89 eastern terminus
Simcoe	Innisfil	109.3	67.9	County Road 54 (10th Sideroad)	
Simcoe	Innisfil	112.4	69.8	County Road 4 (Yonge Street) County Road 89 ends County Road 3 east (Shore Acres Drive)	Fennell; formerly Highway 11; former Highway 89 eastern terminus
1.000 mi = 1.609 km; 1.000 km = 0.621 mi: Closed/former; Concurrency terminus; Route transition
