= Country 105 =

Country 105 may refer to one of the following country music stations:

- CFDC-FM, a Canadian station owned by Bayshore Broadcasting serving Shelburne, Ontario
- CKRY-FM, a Canadian station owned by Corus Entertainment serving Calgary, Alberta
