= Ontario Highway 10 =

Ontario provincial highway

Highway 10
- A map of Highway 10, in red

Route information
- Maintained by Ministry of Transportation of Ontario
- Length: 137.3 km (85.3 mi)
- History: Established September 1848; Designated February 26, 1920

Major junctions
- South end: Northern terminus of Highway 410 – Caledon
- Highway 9 – Orangeville; Highway 89 – Shelburne; Highway 6 – Chatsworth
- North end: Highway 6 / Highway 21 / Highway 26 – Owen Sound

Location
- Country: Canada
- Province: Ontario
- Major cities: Owen Sound, Brampton
- Towns: Markdale, Shelburne, Orangeville, Caledon

Highway system
- Ontario provincial highways; Current; Former; 400-series
← Highway 9	→ Highway 11

King's Highway 10, commonly referred to as Highway 10, is a provincially maintained highway in the Canadian province of Ontario. The highway connects the northern end of Highway 410 just north of Brampton with Owen Sound on the southern shores of Georgian Bay, passing through the towns of Orangeville and Shelburne as well as several smaller villages along the way. It historically followed the Toronto–Sydenham Road, the southern part of which later became the southern section of Hurontario Street. The section between Orangeville and Primrose was formerly part of Prince of Wales Road, which continues northwards after the highway turns west. Between Chatsworth and Owen Sound, Highway 10 is concurrent with Highway 6.

Highway 10 was established in 1920 as one of the original provincial highways in Ontario, connecting Highway 5 in Cooksville with Owen Sound. It was extended south by 1937 to Highway 2 in Port Credit. That same year, it became the site of the first highway interchange in Canada at its intersection with The Middle Road. Since the late 1990s, the southern portion has been truncated to its current terminus north of the Brampton–Caledon border. In September 2009, the extension of Highway 410 connected to Highway 10 for the first time; prior to provincial downloading in 1997, the Highway 10 routing ran further south along Hurontario Street where it was parallel to Highway 410 in Brampton and Mississauga.

== Route description ==
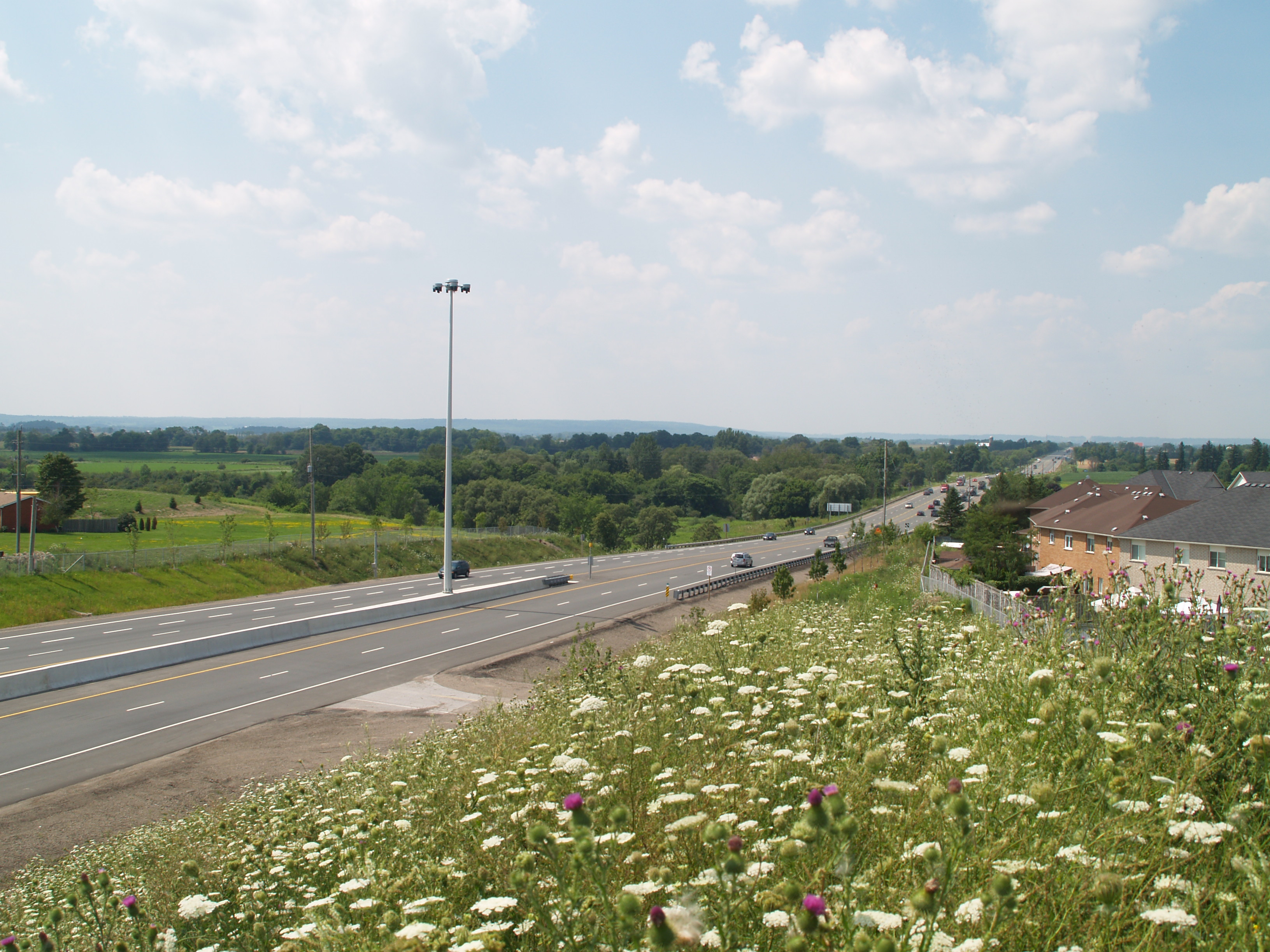
Highway 410 ends as Highway 10 begins

Since September 2009, Highway 10 begins at the northern end of Highway 410 in Caledon, immediately north of Brampton. It follows Hurontario Street, a route originally carved through the virgin forests of Upper Canada in 1848. Like the pioneer route it supplanted, the modern highway still divides many of the towns it serves. Within the Regional Municipality of Peel it acts as the meridian of the concession road system, with parallel sidelines described as being east or west of Hurontario (EHS and WHS, respectively) and perpendicular concession roads divided into eastern and western segments.

Passing to the west of Valleywood, a suburban community on the fringe of the Greater Toronto Area, Highway 10 begins as Highway 410 transitions from a divided freeway to a four-lane rural route with a centre turn lane. The highway presses north-northwest through farmland and rises gradually over the Niagara Escarpment, a UNESCO World Biosphere Reserve. To the west are the Forks of the Credit, a deep glacial ravine and provincial park renowned for its scenery. It passes between several large quarries and through Caledon Village before entering Orangeville at Highway 9, where it diverges from Hurontario Street.

Highway 10 passes to the east of Orangeville on a bypass, switching between Hurontario Street and Prince of Wales Road alignments to avoid the business district. At the north end of the bypass, the highway curves and proceeds northward. It narrows to four lanes immediately north of Orangeville and then to two lanes north of Camilla, which along with Elba is one of two communities interspersed among the farmland that otherwise occupies the distance between Orangeville and Shelburne. At the hamlet of Primrose, Highway 10 turns west and becomes concurrent with Highway 89 into the town of Shelburne. The concurrency ends in the centre of Shelburne, as Highway 10 branches north.

From Shelburne to Owen Sound, the road follows the northernmost part of the former Toronto–Sydenham Road, a colonization road that predates the division of the land in the area. As such, the road follows a diagonal path relative to the survey grid. While it generally passes through farmland, it also bisects the communities of Melancthon, Corbetton, Dundalk, Flesherton—where it meets a former portion of Highway 4—Markdale, Mount Pleasant, Berkeley and Arnott before meeting Highway 6 at Chatsworth. The two highways travel north for approximately 13 kilometres (8 mi) through the community of Rockford. Highway 10 ends at 10th Street East, where it meets the western terminus of Highway 26 as well as the northern terminus of Highway 21. Highway 6 continues northwest, concurrent with Highway 21 through Owen Sound.

== History ==
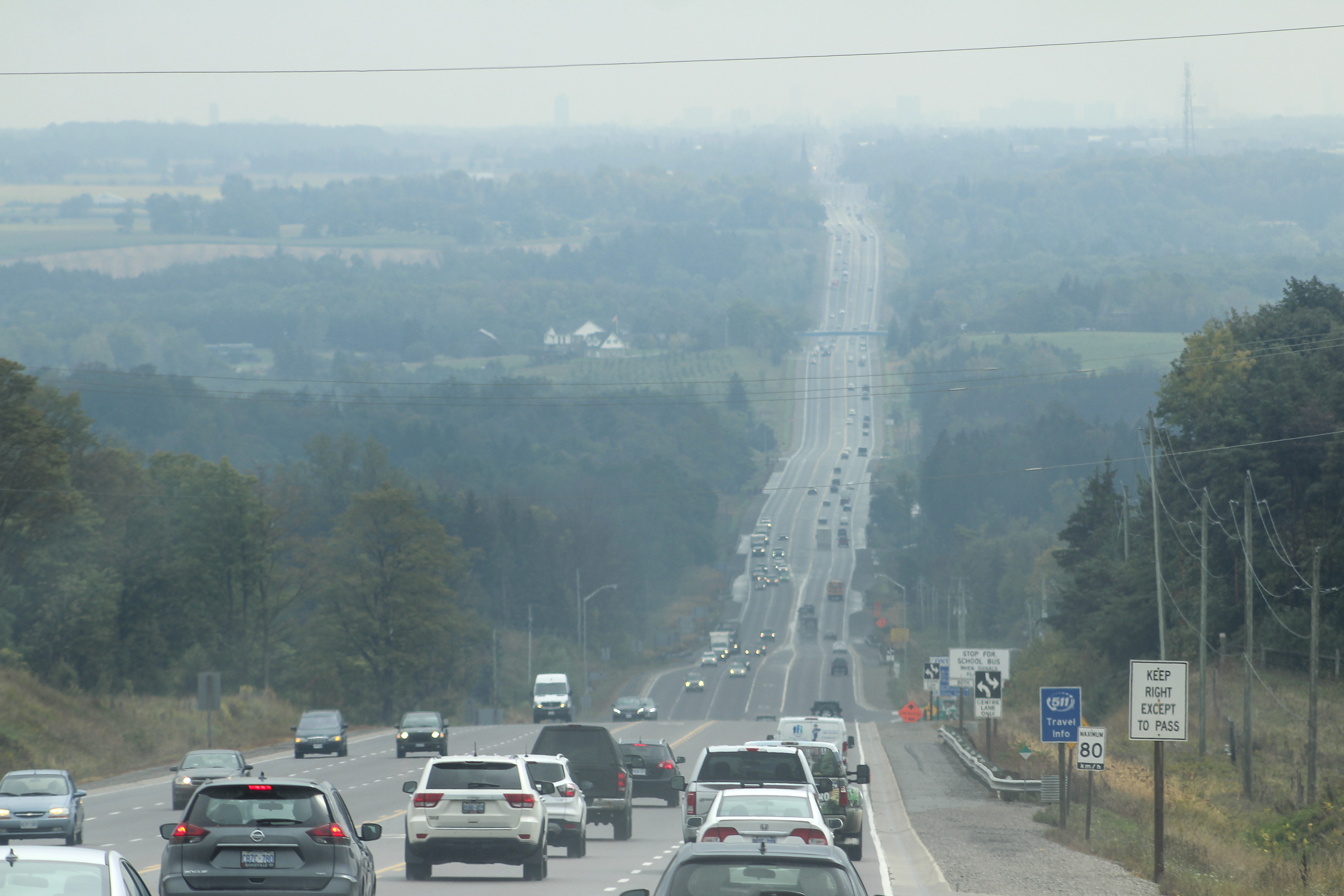
Highway 10 through Caledon

Historically, Highway 10 follows the 19th-century stagecoach route known as the Toronto–Sydenham Road (the southern half of which later became absorbed into Hurontario Street). It travelled north from Dundas Street (later Highway 5) in Cooksville through Brampton, Orangeville and Shelburne to Owen Sound.

In order to be eligible for federal funding, the Department of Public Highways (DPHO) established a network of provincial highways on February 26, 1920. Portions of the network were then assumed by the DPHO over the following year. The section of Highway 10 within Dufferin County between Orangeville and Dundalk was taken over on July 8, 1920. This was followed several weeks later by the portion within Peel County (now Peel Region) between Cooksville and Orangeville on July 22. Finally, the DPHO assumes the portion within Grey County on October 6. It was later extended south from Cooksville when the provincial government assumed the remaining stretch to Lakeshore Road (Highway 2) in Port Credit, on the north shore of Lake Ontario, on March 16, 1921. Until the mid-1920s, highways in Ontario were named rather than numbered. The 166-kilometre (103 mi) Sydenham Highway was designated as Provincial Highway 10 in the summer of 1925.

While initially unpaved, construction of a hard surface along Highway 10 began in 1923. That year saw completion of paving between Port Credit and Cooksville, as well as between Chatsworth and Owen Sound. Paving was completed between Cooksville and Brampton in 1925, and for 11.8 kilometres (7.3 mi) north of Brampton and 9.7 kilometres (6.0 mi) northwest of Melancthon in 1926. Further paving in 1928 and 1929 resulted in the highway having a continuous pavement from Port Credit to Dundalk. Pavement was laid in and near the villages of Flesherton and Markdale in 1931, and between Dundalk and Markdale in 1934. The pavement was extended from Markdale to Berkeley in 1936, leaving an approximately 17-kilometre (11 mi) gap between Berkeley and Chatsworth. This final gravel section was graded and paved in 1937 and 1938.

Highway 10 initially entered Owen Sound along 9th Avenue East, before turning west onto 6th Street East, then north along 2nd Avenue East to Highway 21 and Highway 26 at 10th Avenue East. The official Ontario road maps published between 1947 and 1967 show the route following 3rd Avenue East instead of 2nd Avenue East. Beginning in 1968, the combined highways followed 9th Avenue East directly to 10th Street East, as they do today. Within Orangeville, Highway 10 formerly turned west onto Highway 9 and ran concurrently with it through downtown along Broadway, then turned north to follow First Street (the Prince of Wales Road alignment). In mid-1971, a bypass around Orangeville was completed, bypassing Broadway and the short sections of both Hurontario and First Streets through the town.

The northern terminus of Highway 10 in Owen Sound

As Mississauga was established in 1968 from Toronto Township (which included Cooksville), and later Port Credit, and began to rapidly urbanize and as Brampton grew during the same period, portions of Highway 10 were designated as connecting links and transferred to municipal maintenance through the two cities. On April 1, 1970, a 5.2-kilometre (3.2 mi) segment of the route, from the Port Credit railway underpass to Burnhamthorpe Road, was designated as such. This was followed on December 10, 1970, with the creation of a 2.0 kilometres (1.2 mi) connecting link between Steeles Avenue to south of Clarence Street near downtown Brampton. In 1997, these connecting links were repealed and the highway designation dropped altogether through those cities, shortening the highway to its present length.

In September 2009, Highway 410 was extended and its new terminus feeds directly into Highway 10, directly linking both highways for the first time. In 2009, a major project to widen two-lane sections of the southern portions of the highway was completed, and the highway is now four lanes wide from Highway 410 north to Camilla. From Shelburne north to Owen Sound, it remains a two-lane highway with several passing lanes in hillier regions.

During winter, the northern stretches of the highway that pass through the snowbelt region of Grey County are subject to poor visibility and road closings during windy conditions or winter storms.

== Major intersections ==
The following table lists the major junctions along Highway 10, as noted by the Ministry of Transportation of Ontario.

Division	Location	km	mi	Destinations	Notes
Peel	Mississauga	−28.9	−18.0	Lakeshore Road	Formerly Highway 2
Peel	Mississauga	−26.9	−16.7	Queen Elizabeth Way – Toronto, Hamilton	QEW exit 132
Peel	Mississauga	−25.0	−15.5	Dundas Street	Formerly Highway 5
Peel	Mississauga	−22.9	−14.2	Burnhamthorpe Road	
Peel	Mississauga	−21.8	−13.5	Highway 403 – Toronto, Hamilton	Highway 403 exit 119
Peel	Mississauga	−20.8	−12.9	Eglinton Avenue	
Peel	Mississauga	−17.2	−10.7	Highway 401 – Toronto, London	Highway 401 exit 342
Peel	Brampton	−13.5	−8.4	407 ETR	Highway 407 exit 44
Peel	Brampton	−11.6	−7.2	Regional Road 15 (Steeles Avenue)	
Peel	Brampton	−8.5	−5.3	Queen Street	
Peel	Brampton	−5.4	−3.4	Regional Road 107 (Bovaird Drive) – Georgetown, Vaughan	Formerly Highway 7
Peel	Brampton	−1.0	−0.62	Regional Road 14 (Mayfield Road)	
Peel	Caledon	0.0	0.0	Highway 410 south	Highway 10 southern terminus; continues as Highway 410
Peel	Caledon	0.0	0.0	Hurontario Street / Valleywood Boulevard	Highway 410 exit 21
Peel	Caledon	2.7	1.7	Highway 413	Proposed interchange with future Highway 413
Peel	Caledon	5.2	3.2	Regional Road 9 (King Street) – Terra Cotta, Bolton	
Peel	Caledon	9.5	5.9	Regional Road 12 (Olde Baseline Road)	
Peel	Caledon	14.5	9.0	Regional Road 11 (Forks of the Credit Road)	
Peel	Caledon	18.9	11.7	Regional Road 24 (Charleston Sideroad) – Guelph	Caledon Village; formerly Highway 24 south; former southern end of Highway 24 concurrency
Peel–Dufferin boundary	Caledon–Orangeville boundary	28.3	17.6	County Road 109 west – Arthur	County road serving as a Highway 9 Orangeville bypass that links discontinuous sections of that highway
Peel–Dufferin boundary	Caledon–Orangeville boundary	28.9	18.0	Highway 9 east – Newmarket	Former southern end of Highway 9 concurrency; Highway 10 departs the Hurontario Street alignment
Dufferin	Orangeville	29.4	18.3	Broadway / Buena Vista Drive	Formerly Highway 9 west; former northern end of Highway 9 concurrency
Dufferin	Mono	32.2	20.0	County Road 7 east (Hockley Road) – Loretto; County Road 16 west (5th Sideroad)	
Dufferin	Mono	35.2	21.9	County Road 10 west	
Dufferin	Mono	38.3	23.8	County Road 8 east (Mono Centre Road) – Mono Centre	Camilla
Dufferin	Mono–Mulmur boundary	48.6	30.2	Highway 89 east – Alliston County Road 19 north (Prince of Wales Road)	Primrose; southern end of Highway 89 concurrency
Dufferin	Shelburne	52.6	32.7	County Road 124 north – Collingwood; County Road 11 south (2nd Line)	Formerly Highway 24 north; former northern end of Highway 24 concurrency
Dufferin	Shelburne	52.9	32.9		Beginning of Shelburne Connecting Link
Dufferin	Shelburne	53.9	33.5	Highway 89 west – Mount Forest	Northern end of Highway 89 concurrency
Dufferin	Shelburne	55.1	34.2		End of Shelburne Connecting Link
Dufferin	Melancthon	59.0	36.7	County Road 17	
Dufferin	Melancthon	53.9	33.5	County Road 21 east	Corbetton
Dufferin–Grey boundary	Melancthon–Southgate boundary	72.7	45.2	Dufferin County Road 9 west – Creemore; Grey County Road 9 east – Dundalk	
Grey	Grey Highlands	87.9	54.6	County Road 4 (Durham Street west / Collingwood Street east)	Flesherton Connecting Link; formerly Highway 4
Grey	Grey Highlands	89.8	55.8	County Road 32 east	
Grey	Grey Highlands	98.0	60.9	County Road 12 west	Markdale Connecting Link
Grey	Chatsworth	121.1	75.2	County Road 40 east	
Grey	Chatsworth	124.5	77.4	Highway 6 south – Durham	Southern end of Highway 6 concurrency
Grey	Chatsworth–Georgian Bluffs–Meaford boundary	126.7	78.7	County Road 16 west	
Grey	Georgian Bluffs–Meaford boundary	132.2	82.1	County Road 18	Rockford
Grey	Owen Sound	136.0	84.5	Superior Street / 4th Street East	Beginning of Owen Sound Connecting Link
Grey	Owen Sound	137.3	85.3	Highway 6 north / Highway 21 south (10th Street E) – Shallow Lake, Southampton Highway 26 east (9th Avenue E) – Collingwood, Barrie	Highway 10 northern terminus; Highway 21 northern terminus; Highway 26 western terminus
1.000 mi = 1.609 km; 1.000 km = 0.621 mi: Closed/former; Concurrency terminus; Route transition; Unopened

== See also ==
- Hurontario Street
