= Blacks Corners, Ontario =

Blacks Corners, Ontario may refer to:

- Blacks Corners, Dufferin County, Ontario
- Blacks Corners, Lanark County, Ontario
