= Connecting Link =

Ontario highway designation

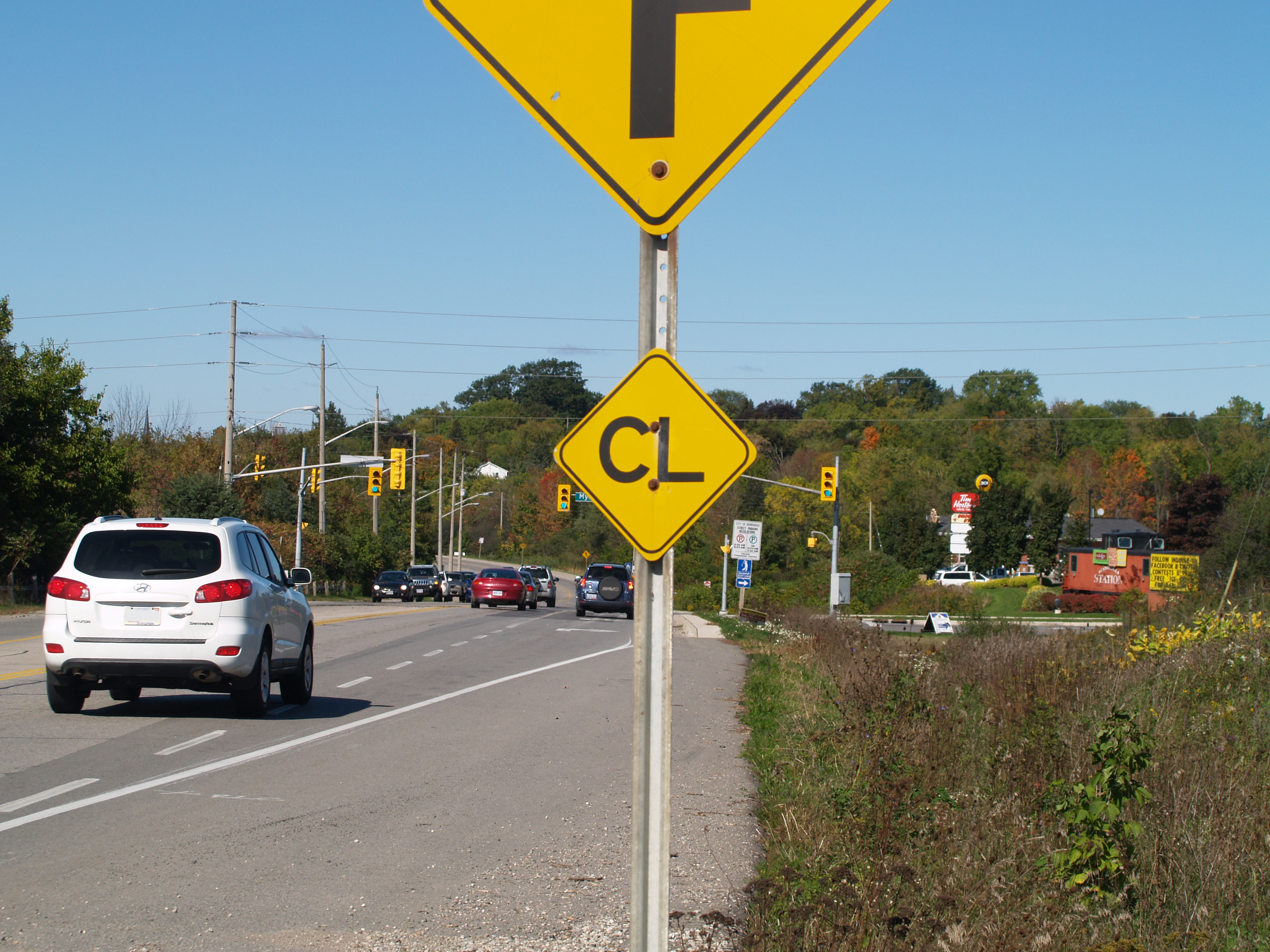
A sign denoting the beginning of a Connecting Link. This particular sign is located on Highway 24 south of Cambridge.

The Connecting Link program is a provincial subsidy provided to municipalities to assist with road construction, maintenance and repairs in the Canadian province of Ontario. Roads which are designated as connecting links form the portions of provincial highways through built-up communities which are not owned by the Ministry of Transportation (MTO). Connecting links are governed by several regulations, including section 144, subsection 31.1 of the Highway Traffic Act and section 21 of the Public Transportation and Highway Improvement Act. While the road is under local control and can be modified to their needs, extensions and traffic signals require the approval of the MTO to be constructed.

The Connecting Link program was established in 1927. Today, 355.4 kilometres (220.8 mi) of roadway in 77 municipalities are maintained under the program. These links cross 70 bridges also maintained under the program.

In return for that particular road being downloaded, the town or county receives money and assistance in maintaining it, and is able to still sign and list it as a provincial highway, though not all connecting links are signed as provincial highways. Some connecting links (typically in cases of municipal streets urbanized before the provincial highway system was established), however, were never provincial-maintained highways at all, but rather local streets or even county or regional roads that the town, city, county, or region has assistance in maintaining.

During the large-scale downloading of many provincial highways in 1997, many connecting links were repealed when their parent highways were decommissioned. However, in some cases, where a highway terminated in a city, only the connecting links through the urbanized areas were repealed, while the rest of the highway remained under provincial jurisdiction. An example of this was Highway 10 through Mississauga and Brampton. In one unique case, Highway 11A, the entire highway was decommissioned as a result of it being a connecting link for its full length.

Most connecting links are busy municipal or county roads that were once provincial highways, and are designated by small yellow squares or diamonds with the text "C/L" or "CL" on them at their start and end termini. These are similar to, but not always related to 7000-series highways.

== Current links ==
The following table lists the current connecting links in the province by highway.

Highway	Municipality (community)	Local street name(s)	Length
Highway 3	Aylmer	Talbot Street	2.25 km (1.40 mi)
Highway 3	Windsor	Huron Church Road	3.75 km (2.33 mi)
Highway 3	Haldimand (Cayuga)	Talbot Road	1.25 km (0.78 mi)
Highway 3	Haldimand (Dunnville)	Broad Street; George Street; Main Street	4.65 km (2.89 mi)
Highway 3	Haldimand (Jarvis)	Talbot Street	1.65 km (1.03 mi)
Highway 3	Norfolk (Delhi)	King Street; James Street	2.10 km (1.30 mi)
Highway 3	Norfolk (Simcoe)	Queensway East; Queensway West	4.00 km (2.49 mi)
Highway 4	Central Huron (Clinton)	Victoria Street	1.30 km (0.81 mi)
Highway 4	South Huron (Exeter)	Main Street	3.15 km (1.96 mi)
Highway 4	Lucan Biddulph (Lucan)	Main Street	2.00 km (1.24 mi)
Highway 4	London	Wonderland Road (from 401 Interchange to Sunningdale Road); Sunningdale Road (from Wonderland Road to Richmond Street); Richmond Street (from Sunningdale Road to northern city limits)	21.80 km (13.55 mi)
Highway 6	South Bruce Peninsula (Wiarton)	Berford Street	2.00 km (1.24 mi)
Highway 6	Chatsworth	Garafraxa Street	0.55 km (0.34 mi)
Highway 6	West Grey (Durham)	Garafraxa Street	2.25 km (1.40 mi)
Highway 6	Haldimand (Hagersville)	Main Street	1.60 km (0.99 mi)
Highway 6	Haldimand (Jarvis)	Main Street	2.30 km (1.43 mi)
Highway 6	Centre Wellington (Fergus)	St. David Street; Tower Street; Bridge Street	3.00 km (1.86 mi)
Highway 6	Guelph	Woolwich Street; Woodlawn Road.	2.55 km (1.58 mi)
Highway 6	Wellington North (Arthur)	Smith Street; George Street	1.90 km (1.18 mi)
Highway 6	Wellington North (Mount Forest)	Main Street; Market Street	2.65 km (1.65 mi)
Highway 6	NEMI (Little Current)	Meredith Street East; Manitowaning Road	1.60 km (0.99 mi)
Highway 6	Espanola	Centre Avenue	4.10 km (2.55 mi)
Highway 6 / Highway 10	Owen Sound	Highways 6/10; 9th Avenue East	1.20 km (0.75 mi)
Highway 6 / Highway 21	Owen Sound	Highways 6/21; 10th Avenue West	2.65 km (1.65 mi)
Highway 7	Halton Hills (Acton)	Queen Street; Young Street; Mill Street; Main Street	2.80 km (1.74 mi)
Highway 7	Halton Hills (Georgetown)	Guelph Street; Main Street	5.10 km (3.17 mi)
Highway 7	Stratford	Erie Street	4.00 km (2.49 mi)
Highway 7	Guelph	Woodlawn Road; Wellington Street; Wyndham Street; York Road	10.00 km (6.21 mi)
Highway 7	Marmora and Lake	Matthew Street	1.30 km (0.81 mi)
Highway 7	Havelock-Belmont-Methuen (Havelock)	Ottawa Street	1.90 km (1.18 mi)
Highway 7	Kawartha Lakes (Omemee)	King Street	2.35 km (1.46 mi)
Highway 7 / Highway 8	Stratford	Ontario Street	3.25 km (2.02 mi)
Highway 8	Central Huron (Clinton)	Huron Street; Ontario Street	2.10 km (1.30 mi)
Highway 8	Goderich	Toronto Street; Huron Road; Elgin Avenue	2.10 km (1.30 mi)
Highway 8	Huron East (Seaforth)	Goderich Street	1.45 km (0.90 mi)
Highway 8	Stratford	Huron Street	2.55 km (1.58 mi)
Highway 8	West Perth (Mitchell)	Ontario Road; Huron Road	2.90 km (1.80 mi)
Highway 9	South Bruce (Mildmay)	Elora Street	1.85 km (1.15 mi)
Highway 9	Minto (Clifford)	Elora Street	1.75 km (1.09 mi)
Highway 9	Minto (Harriston)	Elora Street	0.80 km (0.50 mi)
Highway 10	Shelburne	Owen Sound Street	1.20 km (0.75 mi)
Highway 10	Grey Highlands (Markdale)	Toronto Street	1.45 km (0.90 mi)
Highway 10	Grey Highlands (Flesherton)	Sydenham Street; Toronto Street	0.55 km (0.34 mi)
Highway 10 / Highway 89	Shelburne	Main Street	0.95 km (0.59 mi)
Highway 11	Hearst	Front Street (west of Sixth Street)	1.75 km (1.09 mi)
Highway 11	Kapuskasing	Government Road (Clear Lake Road westerly to Bonnieview Road)	6.80 km (4.23 mi)
Highway 11	Fort Frances	Scott Street; Rainy River Colonization Road; Mill Road	4.75 km (2.95 mi)
Highway 11	Rainy River	Atwood Avenue	2.70 km (1.68 mi)
Highway 11 / Highway 71	Fort Frances	Kings Highway; Rainy River Colonization Road; Third Avenue; Central Avenue; Church Street	4.30 km (2.67 mi)
Highway 15	Smiths Falls	Lombard Street; Beckwith Street; Elmsley Street; Cornelia Street; Union Street	4.65 km (2.89 mi)
Highway 17	Blind River	Causley Street (west of Lot 11/12 Concession 1 Stricker)	4.35 km (2.70 mi)
Highway 17	Sault Ste. Marie	Trunk Road; Black Road; Second Line East; Great Northern Road	19.40 km (12.05 mi)
Highway 17	West Nipissing (Sturgeon Falls)	Front Street (west of Coursol Road)	2.40 km (1.49 mi)
Highway 17	Dryden	Government Road; Grand Trunk Avenue	4.70 km (2.92 mi)
Highway 19	Tillsonburg	Broadway Street; Oxford Street; Simcoe Street; Vienna Street	5.45 km (3.39 mi)
Highway 21	Saugeen Shores (Port Elgin)	Goderich Street	4.25 km (2.64 mi)
Highway 21	Saugeen Shores (Southampton)	Albert Street; Railway Street	5.55 km (3.45 mi)
Highway 21	Goderich	Victoria Street; Bayfield Road; Britannia Road	2.55 km (1.58 mi)
Highway 21	Lambton Shores (Forest)	Main Street; King Street	3.55 km (2.21 mi)
Highway 21	Lambton Shores (Grand Bend)	Ontario Street	3.00 km (1.86 mi)
Highway 23	North Perth (Listowel)	Main Street; Wallace Avenue	2.45 km (1.52 mi)
Highway 23	West Perth (Mitchell)	Blanshard Road; Saint George Street	2.10 km (1.30 mi)
Highway 23	Minto (Harriston)	Arthur Street	0.65 km (0.40 mi)
Highway 24	Brantford	King George Road	2.30 km (1.43 mi)
Highway 24	Norfolk (Simcoe)	Norfolk Street	2.55 km (1.58 mi)
Highway 26	Barrie	Bayfield Street	2.40 km (1.49 mi)
Highway 26	Clearview (Stayner)	King Street; Main Street	2.00 km (1.24 mi)
Highway 26	Collingwood	Lakeshore Street; Front Street; First Street; Huron Street; Hume Street; Pretty River Parkway	11.10 km (6.90 mi)
Highway 26	The Blue Mountains (Thornbury)	Arthur Street; King Street	2.40 km (1.49 mi)
Highway 26	Meaford	Sykes Street	3.45 km (2.14 mi)
Highway 26	Owen Sound	Highway 26; 16th Street East	2.90 km (1.80 mi)
Highway 28	Bancroft	Monck Road; Bridge Street	3.85 km (2.39 mi)
Highway 33	Loyalist Township (Bath)	Main Street	2.75 km (1.71 mi)
Highway 33	Prince Edward (Picton)	Main Street; Bridge Street	2.70 km (1.68 mi)
Highway 34	Champlain (Vankleek Hill)	High Street; Queen Street	1.30 km (0.81 mi)
Highway 34	Hawkesbury	McGill Street; Main Street East; John Street	2.25 km (1.40 mi)
Highway 37	Tweed (Tweed)	Bridgewater Road; Victoria Street; Georgetown Street	2.10 km (1.30 mi)
Highway 40	Chatham-Kent (Chatham)	Grand Avenue East; Saint Clair Street	7.60 km (4.72 mi)
Highway 40	Chatham-Kent (Wallaceburg)	Dufferin Avenue; McNaughton Avenue; Murray Street	4.20 km (2.61 mi)
Highway 41	Bonnechere Valley (Eganville)	Bridge Street; Queen Street; Patrick Street Alice Street	1.20 km (0.75 mi)
Highway 41 / Highway 60	Bonnechere Valley (Eganville)	Bonnechere Street	0.80 km (0.50 mi)
Highway 41 / Highway 148	Pembroke	Pembroke Street East; McKay Street River Road; Muskrat Drive; Olympic Drive	6.15 km (3.82 mi)
Highway 60	Bonnechere Valley (Eganville)	Bonnechere Street; Cobden Road	1.30 km (0.81 mi)
Highway 60	Madawaska Valley (Barry's Bay)	Opeongo Road	1.40 km (0.87 mi)
Highway 60 / Highway 132	Renfrew	O'Brien Street; Coumbes Street; Raglan Street; Stewart Street (Highway 60 only); Lisgar Avenue (Highway 132 only); Munro Avenue (Highway 132 only)	6.80 km (4.23 mi)
Highway 62	Bancroft	Mill Street; Hastings Street	7.25 km (4.50 mi)
Highway 62	Belleville	North Front Street	2.80 km (1.74 mi)
Highway 62	Centre Hastings (Madoc)	Russell Street; St. Lawrence Street; Durham Street	2.00 km (1.24 mi)
Highway 62	Prince Edward (Bloomfield)	Stanley Street Main Street	2.80 km (1.74 mi)
Highway 63	North Bay	Trout Lake Road (Highways 11/17 east to Lee's Road)	3.35 km (2.08 mi)
Highway 64	West Nipissing (Sturgeon Falls)	Ottawa Street (north of Highway 17)	1.70 km (1.06 mi)
Highway 66	Kirkland Lake	Government Road (east of Goldthorpe Drive)	3.70 km (2.30 mi)
Highway 89	Innisfil (Cookstown)	Queen Street; Church Street	1.30 km (0.81 mi)
Highway 89	New Tecumseth (Alliston)	Young Street; King Street; Victoria Street	5.30 km (3.29 mi)
Highway 89	Shelburne	Main Street	0.65 km (0.40 mi)
Highway 89	Minto (Harriston)	Arthur Street	0.50 km (0.31 mi)
Highway 89	Wellington North (Mount Forest)	Queen Street	3.15 km (1.96 mi)
Highway 101	Wawa (Michipicoten)	Mission Road; Main Street	1.30 km (0.81 mi)
Highway 101	Timmins (Porcupine)	Harold Avenue (west of former railway crossing in Porcupine); Algonquin Boulevard; Riverside Drive (east to Kamiskotia Road)	21.35 km (13.27 mi)
Highway 101	Black River-Matheson	Fourth Avenue	0.65 km (0.40 mi)
Highway 108	Elliot Lake	Highway 108 (Esten Drive South north past Timber Road)	5.80 km (3.60 mi)
Highway 118	Dysart et al	Sunnyside Street; Maple Street; Mountain Street; Pine Street	1.15 km (0.71 mi)
Highway 129	Thessalon	Wharncliffe Road (north of Highway 17)	0.87 km (0.54 mi)
Highway 138	Cornwall	Brookdale Avenue	0.95 km (0.59 mi)
Highway 138	Cornwall	Route to Seaway International Bridge	3.80 km (2.36 mi)
Highway 420	Niagara (Niagara Falls)	From Stanley Avenue to Rainbow Bridge	1.50 km (0.93 mi)
Highway 520	Burk's Falls	From South Limit of Burk's Falls to Ryerson Crescent	1.05 km (0.65 mi)
Highway 522	Powassan (Trout Creek)	From junction of Highway 522B, southerly to Barrett St	0.55 km (0.34 mi)
Highway 533	Mattawa	First Street and Main Street (east of Highway 17)	0.95 km (0.59 mi)
Highway 540	NEMI (Little Current)	Meredith Street (Highway 6 to Worthington Street); Worthington Street (south of Meredith Street)	0.95 km (0.59 mi)
Highway 550	Sault Ste. Marie	Second Line West from Great Northern Road westerly	2.21 km (1.37 mi)
Highway 550B	Sault Ste. Marie	Carmen's Way (Second Line West to Queen Street); Queen Street (Carmen's Way to Huron Street)	2.88 km (1.79 mi)
Highway 594	Dryden	Duke Street; West River Road; Aubrey Road	3.90 km (2.42 mi)
Highway 631	Hornepayne	Leslie Avenue (Second Street easterly to Becker Road)	0.80 km (0.50 mi)
Highway 634	Smooth Rock Falls	Highway 634 by-pass (Highway 11 northerly to Cloutierville Road)	3.40 km (2.11 mi)

== See also ==
- List of Ontario provincial highways
- County roads in Ontario
