= Banda, Ontario =

Banda
- Unincorporated rural community
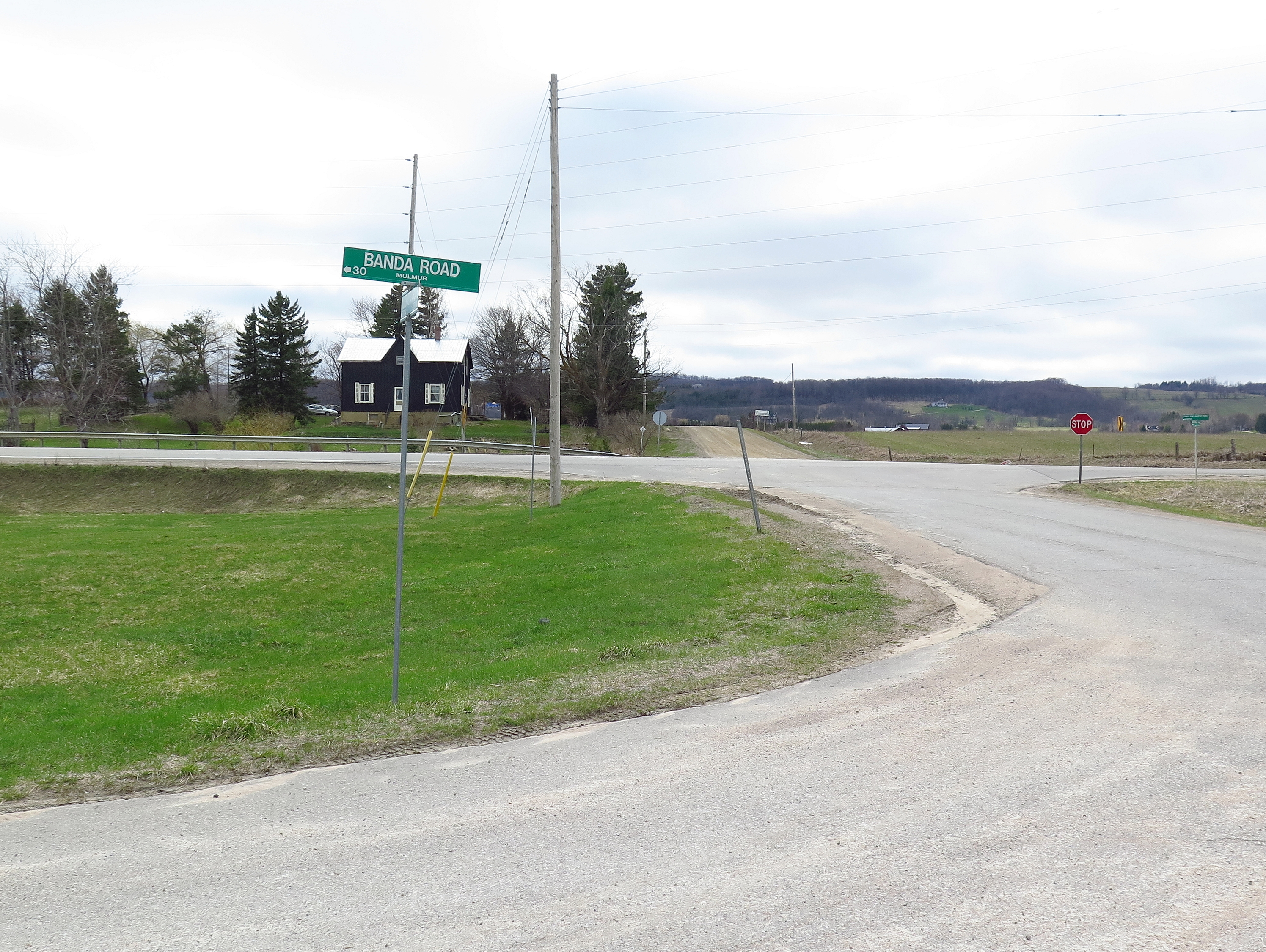
- Looking west on Mulmur–Nottawasaga Townline in Banda

- Location within Ontario Location within Canada
- Coordinates: 44°17′14″N 80°04′00″W
- Country: Canada
- Province: Ontario
- County: Dufferin
- Township: Mulmur
- Time zone: UTC-5 (Eastern (EST))
  - Summer (DST): UTC-4 (EDT)
- GNBC Code: FAESR

Banda is an unincorporated rural community in Dufferin County, Ontario, Canada.

Officially located in Mulmur Township, Banda has historically been associated with both Mulmur Township and Nottawasaga Township (now Clearview Township), because it is located on the boundary between both townships.

== History ==
Duff Lott and his grandson John were early settlers, arriving in the spring of 1845. A log schoolhouse, S.S. No. 6, was built in 1857, and a post office opened in 1860. The name "Banda" was selected by the first postmaster, John Clemenger, after looking at a map of the East Indies where the Banda Islands and Banda Sea are located. That same year, the population of Banda had reached 50. During the 1860s, Banda was noted as having a wagon shop, shoemaker, blacksmith, carpenter, cabinetmaker, and stores.

Christ Church Banda was established north of the settlement in 1865. The extant church and cemetery are today called Banda Anglican Christ Church. Banda Methodist Church (also called Baker's Church) was established west of the settlement in 1867, and in 1869, John Clemenger donated land for a cemetery there. The church closed in 1897 and has been removed, though the cemetery remains. Prior to the 1890s, a presbyterian church was also established.

Banda became known in the region for its cattle fairs, which began in the 1860s.

Orange Lodge No. 426 established in Banda around 1870. The lodge had a fife-and-drum band.

The Wilcox Inn, owned and operated by Joseph Wilcox, opened in Banda during the 1880s. The hotel later moved to Stayner.

By 1890, Banda was receiving daily mail, and a stagecoach stopped daily. The cost of the stagecoach was 25 cents.

The settlement was described in 1908 as a "good dairying and fruit district", when its population had decreased to 30.

The post office closed in 1915, and the school closed in 1965.

Banda was described in 1977 as "a tiny crossroads community".
