= Ruskview =

- Unincorporated rural community
- Location within Ontario Location within Canada
- Coordinates: 44°14′08″N 80°07′18″W
- Country: Canada
- Province: Ontario
- County: Dufferin
- Township: Mulmur
- Time zone: UTC-5 (Eastern (EST))
  - Summer (DST): UTC-4 (EDT)
- GNBC Code: FCMZK

Ruskview is an unincorporated rural community in Mulmur Township, Dufferin County, Ontario, Canada.

Located within the Niagara Escarpment, on the highest bluff overlooking the Pine River valley, Ruskview has been described as "the most scenic of the Escarpment's ghost towns", with a view described as "spectacular".

== History ==
The first settler was Joseph Lennox, who purchased crown land here in 1848.

The settlement was called "Blackbank" until 1875, when that name was given to a settlement a short distance west. In 1883, a post office opened at the original Blackbank and was named "Ruskview", after William Rusk, an early settler, as well as for the scenic view of the valley from the settlement. Mail was brought to Ruskview twice weekly by horseback or by foot, delivered by 15 year-old Seymour Newell. The first postmaster was Joseph Reid, who had built a house, store, and blacksmith shop. A second blacksmith shop later opened at the settlement.

A school was built in the early 1890s, and a Temperance Lodge had been founded by 1895. In 1908, an Orange Lodge was founded. That same year, Ruskview was noted as having a sawmill. In 1914, a branch of the Federated Women's Institute was founded.

The post office closed in 1916.

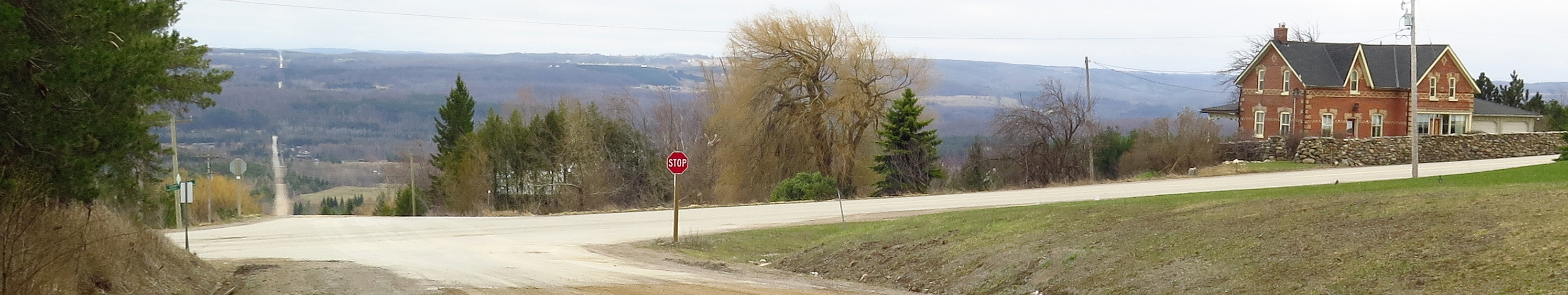
A view of the Pine River valley from Ruskview. The home on the right was formerly the general store and post office.
