= CFDC-FM =

Radio station in Shelburne, Ontario, Canada

Coordinates: 44°14′09″N 80°17′19″W

- Shelburne, Ontario; Canada
- Broadcast area: Dufferin County
- Frequency: 104.9 MHz
- Branding: Country 105

Programming
- Language: English
- Format: Country

Ownership
- Owner: Bayshore Broadcasting
- Sister stations: CISO-FM, CHGB-FM, CHWC-FM

History
- First air date: November 2015
- Call sign meaning: Country for Dufferin County

Technical information
- Class: B
- ERP: 15,600 kWs average 50.0 kW peak
- HAAT: 82 metres (269 ft)

Links
- Website: country105.ca

CFDC-FM (Country 105) is a radio station operating a country format on the frequency of 104.9 MHz/FM in Shelburne, Ontario, Canada.

== History ==
On February 29, 2012, Bayshore Broadcasting Corporation received CRTC approval to operate a new FM radio service to serve Shelburne, broadcasting on 104.9 MHz at a power of 50,000 watts. Bayshore owns a number of radio stations across central Ontario. That same day, a new radio station, owned by MZ Media was also approved in Collingwood, Ontario.

The new station was expected to launch in 2013; however, the new station faced delays for reasons unknown. According to the country104.ca website, the station was expected to launch in late spring 2015, but missed that target as well. It would not be until October 2015 when the station began on-air testing at 104.9 FM.

The station can be heard in Dufferin County and parts of Wellington, Simcoe and Grey counties, as well as the northern portion of Caledon.
