= Shelburne Police Service =

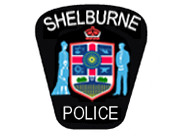
- Motto: A Tradition of Service

Agency overview
- Formed: 1879
- Dissolved: February 2021

Jurisdictional structure
- Legal jurisdiction: Municipal

Operational structure
- Headquarters: Shelburne, Ontario
- Sworn members: 15
- Unsworn members: 6
- Elected officer responsible: Hon. Sylvia Jones, Solicitor General of Ontario
- Agency executive: Kent Moore, chief of police

Website
- Official website

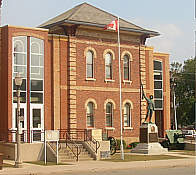
Shelburne Police Station

The Shelburne Police Service (SPS) was the police force for the Town of Shelburne, Ontario, Canada. It was established in 1879 and consisted of 23 members, including 15 police officers, 4 auxiliary police officers, 2 civilian support members. These members provided emergency responses to approximately 8500 residents, responding to more than 4000 calls per year.

Members worked out of Shelburne Town Hall located at 203 Main Street, East in Shelburne, Ontario.

== History ==
After 141 years of service, the Shelburne Police Department was replaced by the Ontario Provincial Police (O.P.P.), a decision that had been weighing over the town for some time. Town council decided to make the change to the OPP after two separate cost estimates.

In February 2021, the shift to the OPP took place, with staffing based out of the O.P.P Primrose Detachment.

The shift to the OPP will take place February 2021 in the town of Shelburne and staffing will be based out of the O.P.P. Primrose Detachment.

== Specialization ==
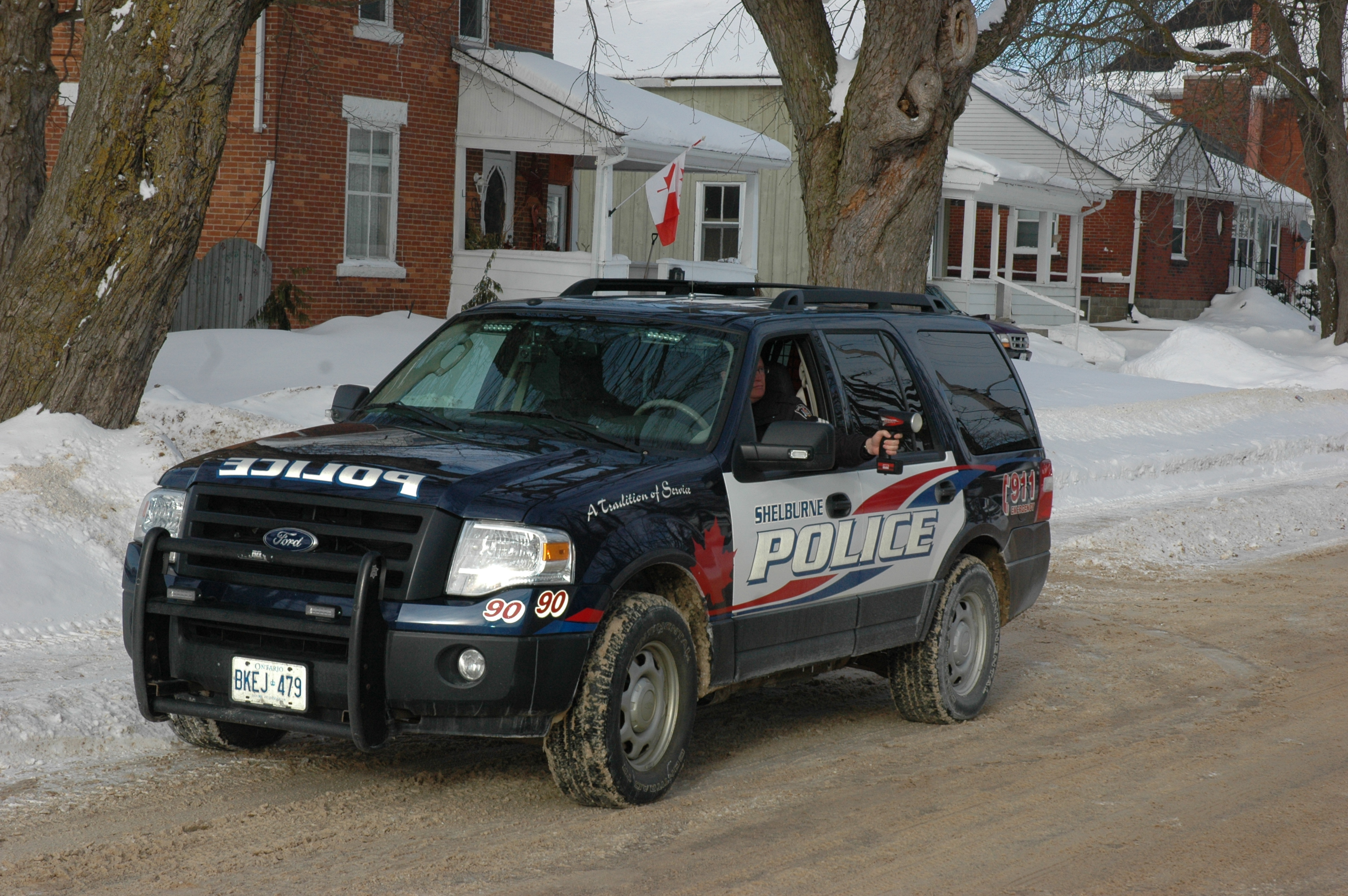
Shelburne police cruiser

The Shelburne Police Service had frontline members trained in the following areas:

- Qualified breath technician
- Community services Drug Abuse Resistance Education
- Bike patrol
- Ontario Sexual Assault Registry
- Freedom of information
- Scenes of crime (SOCO)
- Criminal Intelligence Service of Ontario (CISO)
- Domestic violence
- Media relations
- Major case management
- Violent crime linkage analysis system (ViCLAS)
- VITRA

== Community events ==
The Shelburne Police Service participated in fundraising initiatives for Special Olympics Ontario. Since 2011, the service raised more than $105,000 through events including the annual Law Enforcement Torch Run and, beginning in 2018, the Polar Plunge.

The Shelburne Police Service also participated actively in the annual Stuff A Cruiser, where items (clothing, toys, funds) collected during the holiday season are donated to the Salvation Army and Dufferin Child and Family Services.

== Command ==
The chief of police was the highest-ranking officer. The position belonged to Kent Moore, who was appointed in 2005. The Shelburne Police had two Sergeants: Mark Bennett and Paul Neumann.

== Police services board ==
The police services board was composed of three appointees, in addition to Chief Moore. On the current police services board are:

- Chairman Len Mikulich
- Provincial Appointee Sandra Lawrence
- Shelburne Mayor Wade Mills

Shelburne Police Services Board meetings

Location: police board room, Shelburne Police Service every third Tuesday of the month.

== Special investigations unit ==
The actions of the Shelburne Police were examined by the special investigations unit, a civilian agency responsible for investigating circumstances involving police and civilians that have resulted in a death, serious injury, or allegations of sexual assault.
