= Fennell, Ontario =

- Dispersed rural community
- Yonge Street in Fennell

- Location within Southern Ontario
- Coordinates: 44°12′49″N 79°35′20″W
- Country: Canada
- Province: Ontario
- County: Simcoe
- Township: Innisfil
- Time zone: UTC-5 (Eastern (EST))
  - Summer (DST): UTC-4 (EDT)
- GNBC Code: FBDVX

Fennell is a dispersed rural community in Innisfil Township, Simcoe County, Ontario, Canada.

== History ==
Yonge Street was built in 1825, enabling road travel through the area. Henry Croxon opened The Royal Hotel at Yonge Street and Highway 89, and the crossroads became known as "Croxon's Corners". The hotel prospered, as Highways 89 was used by farmers to deliver goods to the train station at Gilford, and Yonge Street was a main north-south thoroughfare for commerce and people. In 1870, a post office opened inside the hotel. The hotel was destroyed by fire in the 1930s.

A second hotel, Brown's Hotel, opened before 1850.

The early settlement contained a blacksmith, and had a population of 80 in 1873.

Croxon's Corners was renamed "Fennell" in 1896 in honour of Joseph Fennell, a local politician.

Fennell currently contains a baseball park, gas stations, and 63 homes. The population in 2024 was 159.
