= Mono Mills, Ontario =

Mono Mills
- Village
- Mono Mills within Canada Mono Mills (Canada)
- Coordinates: 43°56′42.7″N 79°58′08.9″W
- Country: Canada
- Province: Ontario
- Regional Municipality: Peel
- Town: Caledon
- Founded: 1820s

Population
  - Total: 755

Mono Mills is a small village in the town of Caledon, within Peel Regional Municipality in Ontario, Canada. The population is 755 people.

== Geography ==
Mono Mills is located directly south of the border of Caledon with the town of Mono. It is located orientally from Orangeville. Highway 9 runs through the core of the village.

== History ==
Mono Mills emerged as a hamlet in the 1820s. The first settlers were of Dutch origin. The Mono Mills name is derived from its location situated partly in Mono Township, combined with the fact that a grist mill once operated here. Industry and businesses sprung up around the mill and the population grew enough that the Mono Mills post office opened in 1839. By the 1870s the grist mill was flourishing and was supported by numerous businesses including a wagon works, blacksmith shop, harness shop, three general stores and four hotels as a lot of trade and commerce was conducted here. The hamlet itself also had three churches and a school.
