= Grand Valley, Ontario =

Grand Valley
- Town (lower-tier)
- Town of Grand Valley
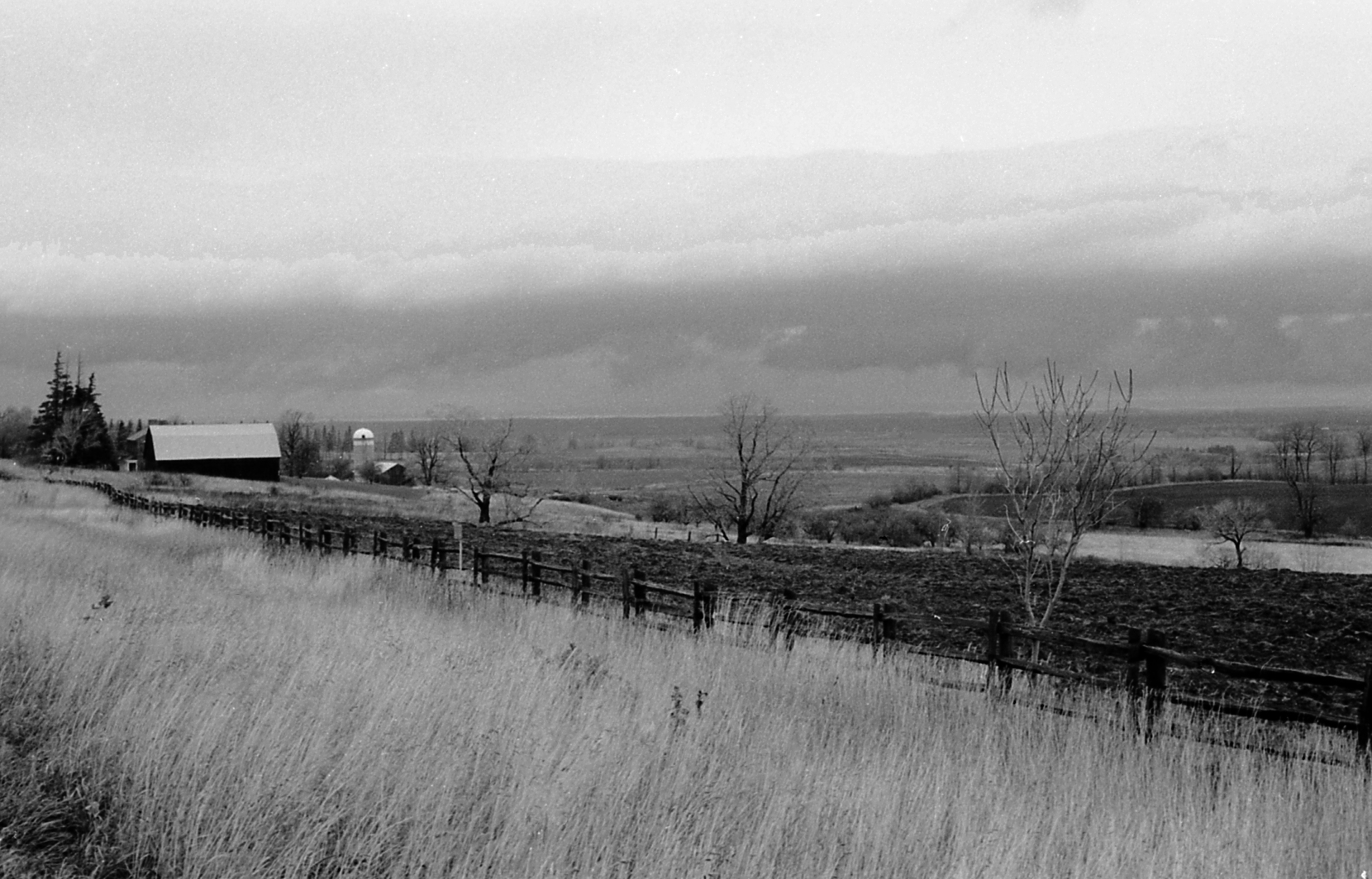

- Coat of arms
- Motto: Nature's Playground
- Grand Valley within Dufferin County

- Grand Valley in relation to southern Ontario
- Coordinates: 43°57′N 80°22′W
- Country: Canada
- Province: Ontario
- County: Dufferin
- Formed: January 1, 1995

Government
  - Mayor: Steve Soloman
  - Fed. riding: Dufferin—Caledon
  - Prov. riding: Dufferin—Caledon

Area
  - Land: 158.60 km^{2} (61.24 sq mi)

Population (2021)
  - Total: 3,851
  - Density: 24.3/km^{2} (63/sq mi)
- Time zone: UTC-5 (EST)
  - Summer (DST): UTC-4 (EDT)
- Postal code: L9W
- Area codes: 519, 226
- Website: www.townofgrandvalley.ca

Grand Valley (formerly The Township of East Luther Grand Valley) is a town in the Canadian province of Ontario. The town is located within Dufferin County, and includes part of the Luther Marsh. The marsh covers over 10,000 acres (40 km²) including Luther Lake. Its main namesake population centre, Grand Valley, is located along the Grand River.

== Geography ==
- The town's northern limit is Highway 10 and Highway 89; north of the limit is the township of Melancthon.
- The town's southern limit is Dufferin County Road 109; south of the limit is the township of East Garafraxa.
- The town's eastern limit is Amaranth-East Luther Townline; east of the limit is the township of Amaranth.
- The town's western limit is East Luther-West Luther Line; west of the limit is the township of Wellington North.

=== Communities ===
The Town of Grand Valley comprises a number of villages and hamlets, including the following communities:

- Colbeck, Damascus
- Grand Valley
- Leggatt
- Monticello
- Peepabun
- Tarbert
- Erasmus
- Hill Settlement
- Keldon
- Wesley
- Chatter's Corners
- Doyle's Settlement

== History ==
The formation of the town under the name Township of East Luther Grand Valley was a result of an amalgamation effective January 1, 1995, of the Township of East Luther and the Village of Grand Valley. In September 2012, the name was changed to the Town of Grand Valley.

Grand Valley was hit by an F4 tornado on May 31, 1985, that destroyed much of the town's infrastructure, which has since been rebuilt.

== Demographics ==
In the 2021 Census of Population conducted by Statistics Canada, Grand Valley had a population of 3,851 living in 1,397 of its 1,445 total private dwellings, a change of 30.3% from its 2016 population of 2,956. With a land area of 158.6 km^{2} (61.2 sq mi), it had a population density of 24.3/km^{2} (62.9/sq mi) in 2021.

Canada census – Grand Valley community profile

	2021	2016	2011
Population	3,851 (+30.3% from 2016)	2,956 (8.4% from 2011)	2,726 (-4.1% from 2006)
Land area	158.60 km^{2} (61.24 sq mi)	158.23 km^{2} (61.09 sq mi)	158.23 km^{2} (61.09 sq mi)
Population density	24.3/km^{2} (63/sq mi)	18.7/km^{2} (48/sq mi)	17.2/km^{2} (45/sq mi)
Median age	36.8 (M: 36.4, F: 37.2)	40.9 (M: 40.1, F: 41.8)	41.5 (M: 41.1, F: 41.8)
Private dwellings	1,445 (total) 1,397 (occupied)	1,145 (total)	1,048 (total)
Median household income	$101,000	$80,691

References: 2021 2016 2011

Historical census populations – Grand Valley, Ontario
Year	Pop.	±%
1991	2,501	—
1996	2,773	+10.9%
2001	2,842	+2.5%
2006	2,844	+0.1%
2011	2,726	−4.1%
2016	2,956	+8.4%
2021	3,851	+30.3%
Source: Statistics Canada

== Local government ==
Municipal council (as of 2026):

- Mayor: Steve Soloman
- Deputy Mayor: Philip Rentsch
- Councillors:
  - Paul Latam
  - Lorne Dart
  - James Jonker

== Grand Valley B.I.A. ==
The Grand Valley B.I.A. is encouraging commerce developments in the town. In an attempt to accommodate new development, the town is in the process of updating the By-laws.

The Grand Valley B.I.A., is the smallest Business Improvement Area in Ontario.

== Movies filmed in Grand Valley ==
- The Prize Winner of Defiance, Ohio (2007)
- Aftermath: Population Zero (2008) Aftermath: Population Zero Small segment from 9:00 to 9:12 in the film

== See also ==
- List of towns in Ontario
