= Shelburne, Ontario =

Shelburne
- Town (lower-tier)
- Town of Shelburne
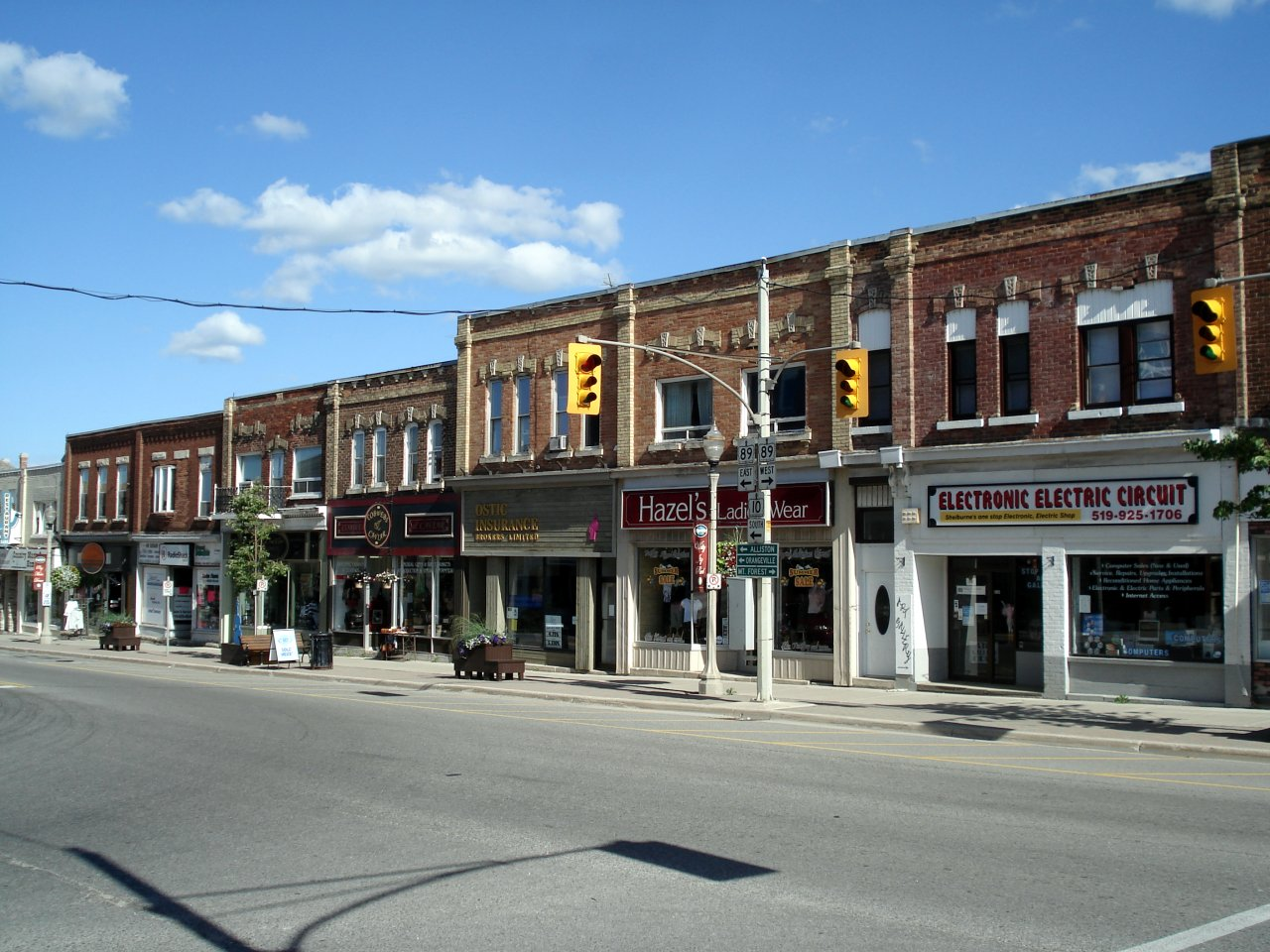
- Shelburne's Town Centre, at the intersection of Highway 89 and Highway 10
- Motto: A people place – A change of pace
- Shelburne within Dufferin County

- Location within Southern Ontario
- Coordinates: 44°05′N 80°12′W
- Country: Canada
- Province: Ontario
- County: Dufferin
- Settled: Early 1860s
- Incorporated: March 22, 1879 (village)
- Incorporated: December 31, 1976 (town)

Government
  - Mayor: Wade Mills
  - Deputy Mayor: Shane Hall
  - Councillors: List: Walter Benotto; Lindsay Wegener; Dan Sample; Kyle Fregan; Len Guchardi
  - Fed. riding: Dufferin—Caledon
  - Prov. riding: Dufferin—Caledon

Area
  - Land: 6.56 km^{2} (2.53 sq mi)

Population (2021)
  - Total: 8,994
  - Density: 1,370.8/km^{2} (3,550/sq mi)
- 2021 Canada census
- Time zone: UTC−5 (EST)
  - Summer (DST): UTC−4 (EDT)
- Postal code: Various L9V
- Area codes: 519, 226
- Highways: Highway 89; Highway 10
- Website: www.shelburne.ca

Shelburne is a town in Dufferin County, Ontario, Canada, located at the intersection of Highway 10 and Highway 89. Shelburne is known for hosting the Annual Canadian Championship Old Time Fiddling Contest that is was held in August.

== History ==
In the early 1860s, the founder of the town Shelburne, William Jelly, found his way through the bushes to choice lots in Melancthon and built several cabins in the area.

As Melancthon began developing in the late 1840s, the construction of the Toronto-Sydenham Road (now Highway 10) began and led to settlers moving into the Shelburne area in the 1860s. In 1865, William Jelly established the British Canadian Hotel. A post office was built shortly after, named after the Earl of Shelburne. Rapid economic growth followed and the population increased from 70 villagers in 1869 to 750 villagers in 1877, due to the new railways that were built. Shelburne was incorporated as a town in 1877.

== Demographics ==
In the 2021 Census of Population conducted by Statistics Canada, Shelburne had a population of 8,994 living in 3,025 of its 3,150 total private dwellings, a change of 10.7% from its 2016 population of 8,126. With a land area of 6.56 km^{2} (2.53 sq mi), it had a population density of 1,371.0/km^{2} (3,551.0/sq mi) in 2021.

Historical census populations – Shelburne, Ontario

Year	Pop.	±%
1881	733	—
1891	1,202	+64.0%
1901	1,188	−1.2%
1911	1,113	−6.3%
1921	1,072	−3.7%
1931	1,077	+0.5%
1941	1,005	−6.7%
1951	1,184	+17.8%

Year	Pop.	±%
1956	1,245	+5.2%
1961	1,239	−0.5%
1966	1,354	+9.3%
1971	1,790	+32.2%
1976	2,928	+63.6%
1981	2,862	−2.3%
1986	2,987	+4.4%
1991	3,436	+15.0%

Year	Pop.	±%
1996	3,790	+10.3%
2001	4,122	+8.8%
2006	5,149	+24.9%
2011	5,846	+13.5%
2016	8,126	+39.0%
2021	8,994	+10.7%

Population counts are not adjusted for boundary changes.
Source: Statistics Canada

Canada 2016 Census		Population	% of Total Population
Visible minority group Source:	Black	750	9.5
Visible minority group Source:	South Asian	390	4.9
Visible minority group Source:	Filipino	75	0.9
Visible minority group Source:	Latin American	60	0.8
Visible minority group Source:	Southeast Asian	15	0.2
Visible minority group Source:	Other visible minority	115	1.5
Total visible minority population		1,410	17.9
Aboriginal group Source:	First Nations	95	1.2
Aboriginal group Source:	Métis	80	1.0
Total Aboriginal population		180	2.3
European		6,536	80
Total population		8,126	100

== Economy ==
Major local employers have included automotive part manufacturers Johnson Controls (until 2009) and KTH Manufacturing. Other major companies include Ice River Springs and its Blue Mountain Plastics subsidiary. The latter manufactures water bottles from recycled plastics using 29,000 tonnes of plastic annually, obtained from municipal recycling programmes. In July 2020, the company announced that it would be buying all of the Canadian bottling operations of Nestlé Waters.

An industrial area has been established in the south end of town. Roads have been constructed to provide access to potential industries. The objective of this industrial area is to encourage industrial growth within the town. Shelburne is also home to a small retail sector and many residents commute to Orangeville, Brampton and other centres in the Greater Toronto Area.

== Local government ==
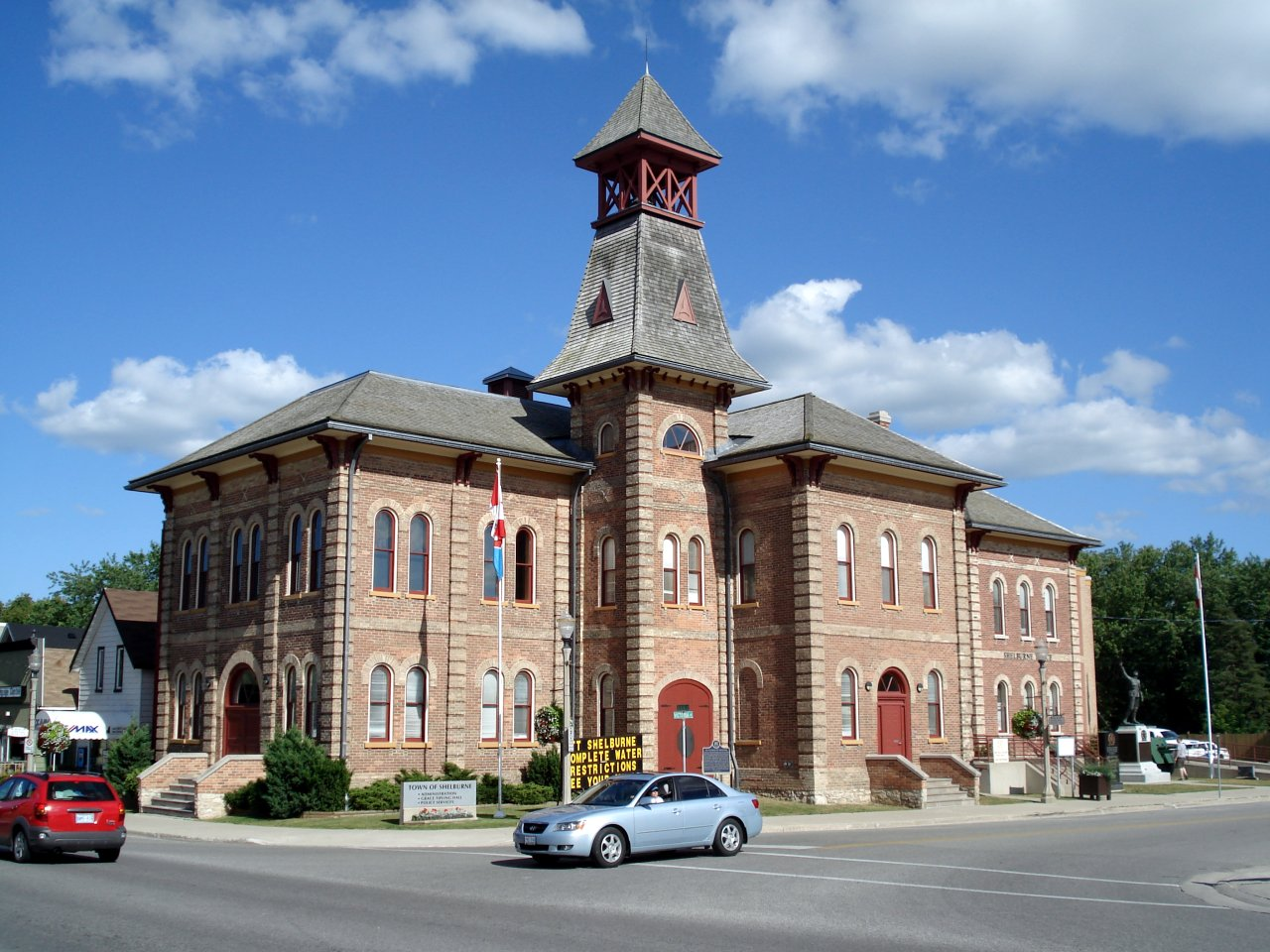
Town Hall c. 1883

The Town's Council includes the Mayor, Deputy Mayor, and five Councillors elected on the basis of one per ward. The members of council elected as of the 2022 Municipal Election: are:

- Mayor: Wade Mills
- Deputy Mayor: Shane Hall
- Councillors:
  - Walter Benotto
  - Lindsay Wegener
  - Dan Sample
  - Kyle Fegan
  - Len Guchardi

== Sports teams ==
- Shelburne Muskies – WOAA Senior AA Hockey League- Shelburne Cricket Club – SCC House League and Dufferin County Cup – DCC

== Emergency services ==
The residents of the town are protected by the Ontario Provincial Police. Formerly protected by members of the Shelburne Police Service from 1879 to 2021.

Fire protection is provided by the Shelburne and District Fire Department with one station.

== Education ==
Shelburne is part of the Upper Grand District School Board. The town's high school is Centre Dufferin District High School. Elementary schools include Glenbrook Elementary, Hyland Heights Elementary and Centennial Hylands Elementary.

== Media ==
The Shelburne Free Press publishes weekly in Shelburne. CFDC-FM 104.9, licensed to and based in Shelburne, broadcasts country music on 104.9, branded as Country 105. The regional weekly Orangeville Banner is also distributed to Shelburne.

== Notable residents ==
- Eric Nagler — singer, actor
- Jesse Sebastiani — YouTuber (NELK)
- Aaron Downey — Former NHL player
- Harry Gozzard — jazz musician from big band era
- Ruby Waters – singer/songwriter

== See also ==
- List of towns in Ontario
