= Melancthon, Ontario =

Melancthon
- Township (lower-tier)
- Township of Melancthon
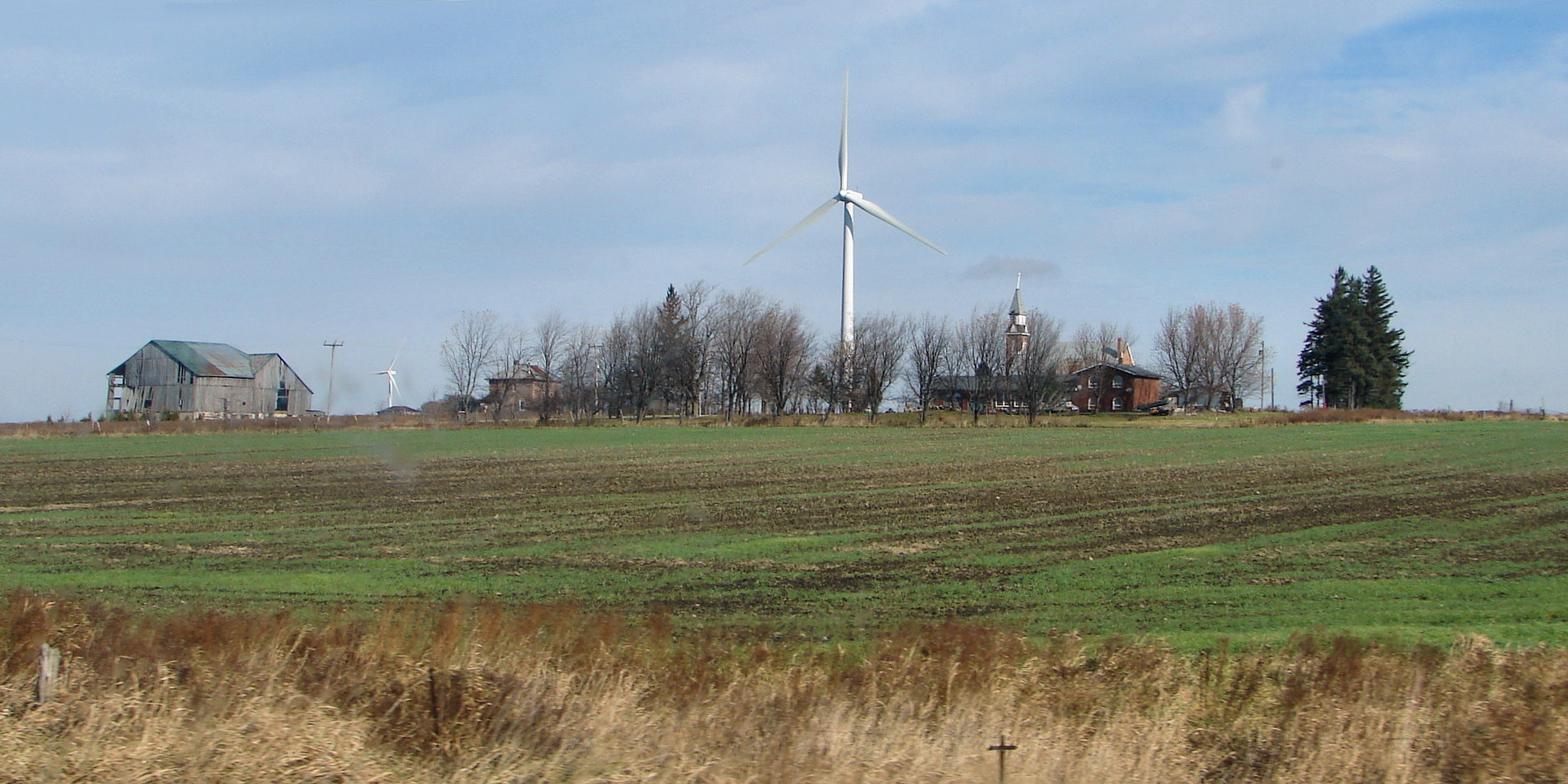

- Melancthon Township within Dufferin County

- Melancthon in southern Ontario
- Coordinates: 44°9′N 80°16′W
- Country: Canada
- Province: Ontario
- County: Dufferin
- Settled: 1818
- Incorporated: January 1, 1853

Government
  - Mayor: Darren White
  - Fed. riding: Dufferin—Caledon
  - Prov. riding: Dufferin—Caledon

Area
  - Land: 310.39 km^{2} (119.84 sq mi)

Population (2021)
  - Total: 3,132
  - Density: 10.1/km^{2} (26/sq mi)
- Time zone: UTC-5 (EST)
  - Summer (DST): UTC-4 (EDT)
- Postal Code: L9V
- Area codes: 519, 226, 548
- Website: melancthontownship.ca

Melancthon is a rural Canadian township in the northwest corner of Dufferin County, Ontario, bordered on the east by Mulmur Township, Amaranth Township and East Luther Grand Valley to the south, Southgate Township to the west, and the Municipality of Grey Highlands to the north. The township does not include the town of Shelburne on its southern border. It has one of the lowest population densities in southwestern Ontario.

The primary industry of the township is farming, with limited beef, dairy, sheep and horse farming. It is also home to the Melancthon EcoPower Centre wind farm.

The township was founded in 1853 as a part of Grey County and transferred to Dufferin County in 1881. As of 2026, Township council comprises Mayor Darren White, Deputy Mayor James McLean, and three councillors.

== Communities ==
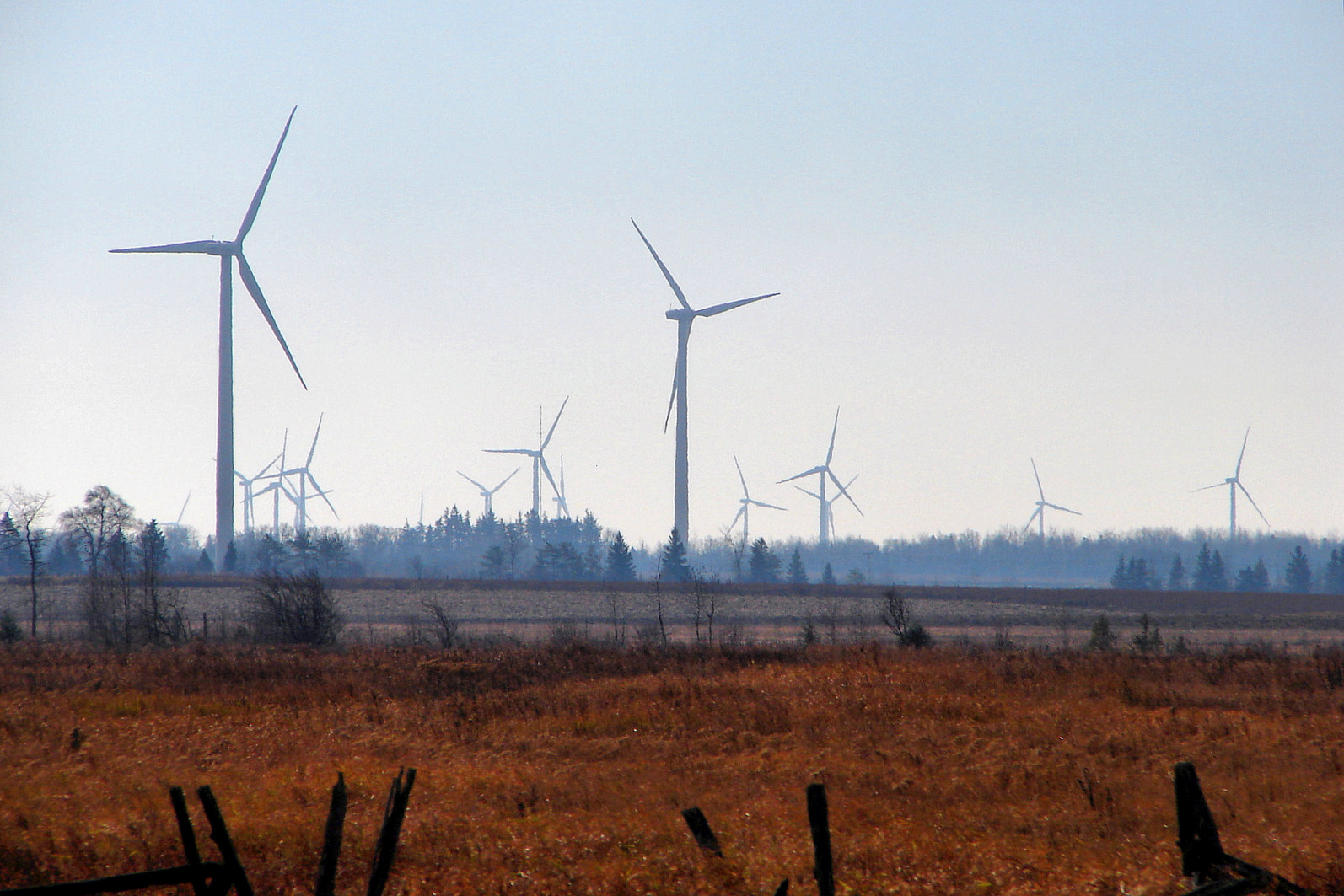
Wind farm in Melancthon

The township of Melancthon comprises a number of villages and hamlets, including the following communities:

- Auguston
- Corbetton
- Horning's Mills
- Masonville
- Mayburne
- Melancthon
- Ostrander
- Redickville
- Riverview
- Shrigley
- Wrigglesworth Corner

== Demographics ==
In the 2021 Census of Population conducted by Statistics Canada, Melancthon had a population of 3,132 living in 1,035 of its 1,104 total private dwellings, a change of 4.1% from its 2016 population of 3,008. With a land area of 310.39 km^{2} (119.84 sq mi), it had a population density of 10.1/km^{2} (26.1/sq mi) in 2021.

Historical census populations – Melancthon, Ontario

Year	Pop.	±%
1871	2,043	—
1881	3,099	+51.7%
1891	3,822	+23.3%
1901	3,831	+0.2%
1911	3,080	−19.6%
1921	2,804	−9.0%
1931	2,571	−8.3%
1941	2,344	−8.8%

Year	Pop.	±%
1951	2,289	−2.3%
1956	2,275	−0.6%
1961	2,147	−5.6%
1966	2,070	−3.6%
1971	2,096	+1.3%
1976	2,152	+2.7%
1981	2,143	−0.4%
1986	2,149	+0.3%

Year	Pop.	±%
1991	2,450	+14.0%
1996	2,607	+6.4%
2001	2,796	+7.2%
2006	2,895	+3.5%
2011	2,839	−1.9%
2016	3,008	+6.0%
2021	3,132	+4.1%

Population counts are not adjusted for boundary changes.
Source: Statistics Canada

== See also ==
- List of townships in Ontario
