= Mulmur =

- Township (lower-tier)
- Township of Mulmur
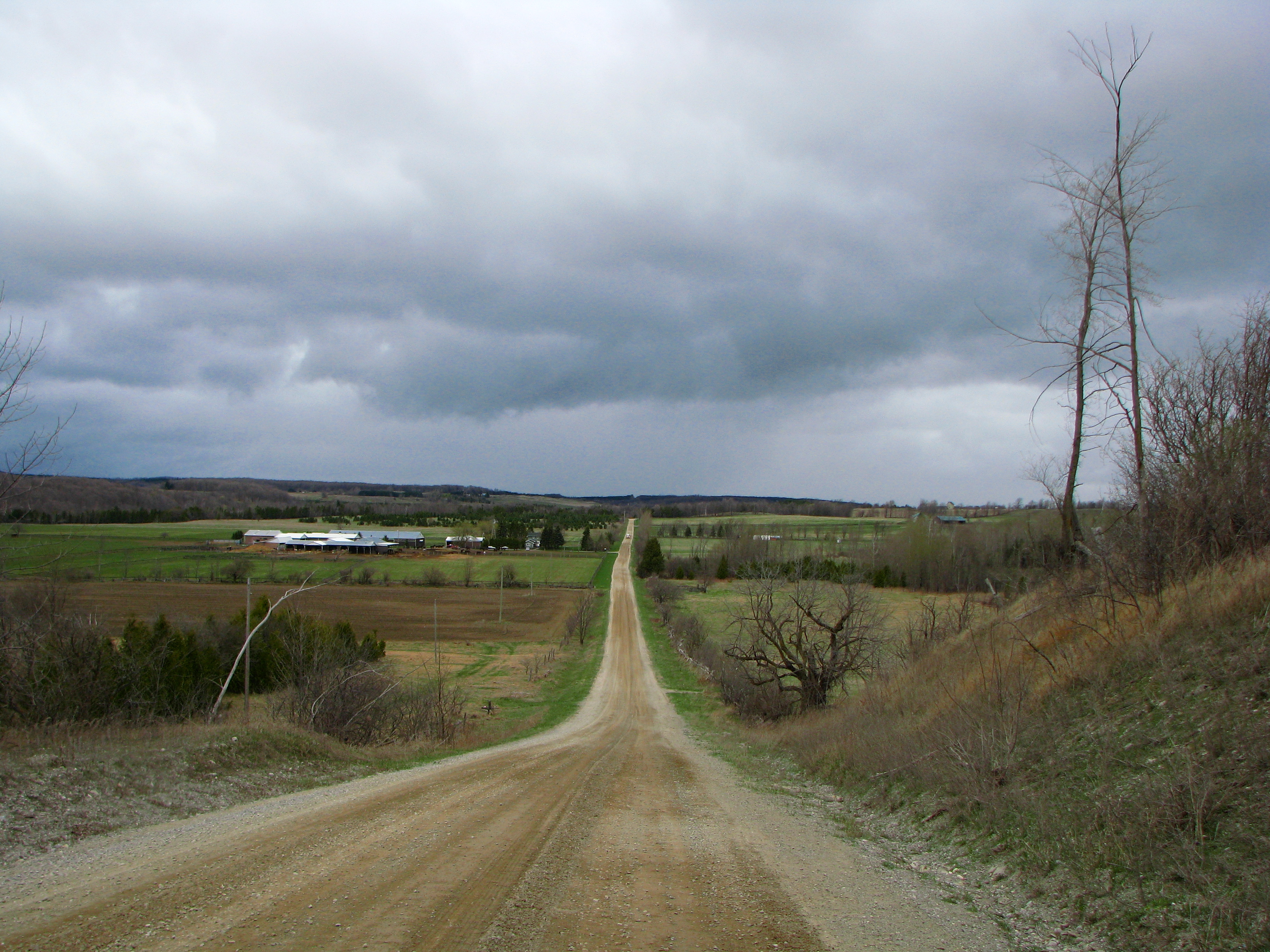

- Mulmur within Dufferin County

- Location of Mulmur within Ontario
- Coordinates: 44°11′15″N 80°06′07″W
- Country: Canada
- Province: Ontario
- County: Dufferin
- Incorporated: January 1, 1851

Government
  - Mayor: Janet Horner
  - Fed. riding: Dufferin—Caledon
  - Prov. riding: Dufferin—Caledon

Area (2021)
  - Land: 286.17 km^{2} (110.49 sq mi)

Population (2021)
  - Total: 3,571
  - Density: 12.5/km^{2} (32/sq mi)
- Time zone: UTC−05:00 (EST)
  - Summer (DST): UTC−04:00 (EDT)
- Postal Code: L9V
- Area codes: 519, 226, 548
- Website: mulmur.ca

Mulmur is a township in Dufferin County in Southern Ontario, Canada. There are a number of original settlements such as Mulmur Corners, some of which can still be identified as to location, including Rosemont and Stanton.

== Geography ==
=== Communities ===
The township of Mulmur comprises a number of villages and hamlets, including:

- Airlie (partially)
- Banda (partially)
- Black Bank
- Earnscliffe
- Happy Valley
- Honeywood
- Kilgorie
- Lavender (partially)
- Mansfield
- Mulmur
- Mulmur Corners (partially)
- Perm
- Ponton Mills
- Randwick
- Rookery Creek
- Rosemont (partially)
- Ruskview
- Scarlet Hill
- Slabtown
- Stanton
- Terra Nova
- Violet Hill (partially)
- Whitfield
- Conover
- Henderson's Corners (partially)
- Hipson's Corners
- Boyne Mill
- Hall's Corners
- Old Egypt
- Primrose (partially)

=== Climate ===
Climate data for Ruskview (Mulmur) Climate ID: 6147229; coordinates 44°14′N 80°08′W; elevation: 472.4 m (1,550 ft); 1981−2010 normals, extremes 1985–2006
Month	Jan	Feb	Mar	Apr	May	Jun	Jul	Aug	Sep	Oct	Nov	Dec	Year
Record high °C (°F)	13.5 (56.3)	12.0 (53.6)	22.5 (72.5)	28.5 (83.3)	31.5 (88.7)	33.0 (91.4)	34.0 (93.2)	35.0 (95.0)	33.0 (91.4)	28.0 (82.4)	20.0 (68.0)	16.0 (60.8)	35.0 (95.0)
Mean daily maximum °C (°F)	−3.6 (25.5)	−2.9 (26.8)	2.3 (36.1)	10.1 (50.2)	17.1 (62.8)	22.3 (72.1)	24.7 (76.5)	23.7 (74.7)	19.5 (67.1)	11.9 (53.4)	4.9 (40.8)	−1.3 (29.7)	10.7 (51.3)
Daily mean °C (°F)	−7.3 (18.9)	−6.8 (19.8)	−1.9 (28.6)	5.4 (41.7)	12.1 (53.8)	17.4 (63.3)	19.7 (67.5)	18.8 (65.8)	14.7 (58.5)	7.9 (46.2)	1.7 (35.1)	−4.3 (24.3)	6.4 (43.5)
Mean daily minimum °C (°F)	−10.9 (12.4)	−10.7 (12.7)	−6.0 (21.2)	0.8 (33.4)	7.0 (44.6)	12.4 (54.3)	14.7 (58.5)	13.9 (57.0)	9.9 (49.8)	3.8 (38.8)	−1.6 (29.1)	−7.3 (18.9)	2.2 (36.0)
Record low °C (°F)	−31.5 (−24.7)	−30.0 (−22.0)	−29.0 (−20.2)	−13.0 (8.6)	−3.5 (25.7)	2.0 (35.6)	5.0 (41.0)	4.0 (39.2)	−3.0 (26.6)	−7.0 (19.4)	−18.5 (−1.3)	−29.5 (−21.1)	−31.5 (−24.7)
Average precipitation mm (inches)	85.6 (3.37)	69.8 (2.75)	68.0 (2.68)	73.9 (2.91)	86.9 (3.42)	90.8 (3.57)	81.5 (3.21)	79.4 (3.13)	95.4 (3.76)	83.3 (3.28)	100.3 (3.95)	80.9 (3.19)	995.8 (39.20)
Average rainfall mm (inches)	21.1 (0.83)	15.7 (0.62)	31.2 (1.23)	60.7 (2.39)	86.7 (3.41)	90.8 (3.57)	81.5 (3.21)	79.4 (3.13)	95.4 (3.76)	73.8 (2.91)	60.8 (2.39)	21.0 (0.83)	718.0 (28.27)
Average snowfall cm (inches)	64.6 (25.4)	54.1 (21.3)	36.6 (14.4)	13.2 (5.2)	0.2 (0.1)	0.0 (0.0)	0.0 (0.0)	0.0 (0.0)	0.0 (0.0)	9.4 (3.7)	39.5 (15.6)	59.9 (23.6)	277.5 (109.3)
Average precipitation days (≥ 0.2 mm)	15.7	12.7	12.6	13.0	13.2	12.2	11.4	12.1	13.4	17.3	18.1	15.0	166.8
Average rainy days (≥ 0.2 mm)	3.2	3.0	6.0	11.5	13.2	12.2	11.4	12.1	13.5	16.5	12.5	4.1	119.1
Average snowy days (≥ 0.2 cm)	13.5	10.3	7.6	2.7	0.1	0.0	0.0	0.0	0.0	1.8	6.9	11.6	54.4
Source: Environment and Climate Change Canada

== Demographics ==
In the 2021 Canadian census conducted by Statistics Canada, Mulmur had a population of 3,571 living in 1,388 of its 1,682 total private dwellings, a change of 2.7% from its 2016 population of 3,478. With a land area of 286.17 km^{2} (110.49 sq mi), it had a population density of 12.5/km^{2} (32.3/sq mi) in 2021.

Canada census – Mulmur community profile

	2021	2016	2011
Population	3,571 (+2.7% from 2016)	3,478 (+2.6% from 2011)	3,391 (+2.2% from 2006)
Land area	286.17 km^{2} (110.49 sq mi)	286.77 km^{2} (110.72 sq mi)	286.73 km^{2} (110.71 sq mi)
Population density	12.5/km^{2} (32/sq mi)	12.1/km^{2} (31/sq mi)	11.8/km^{2} (31/sq mi)
Median age	50 (M: 50.8, F: 49.6)	47.9 (M: 48.3, F: 47.5)	45.2 (M: 45.6, F: 44.7)
Private dwellings	1,682 (total) 1,388 (occupied)	1,674 (total)	1,643 (total)
Median household income	$114,000	$97,344

References: 2021 2016 2011

Historical census populations – Mulmur

Year	Pop.	±%
1871	3,505	—
1881	4,211	+20.1%
1891	3,661	−13.1%
1901	3,253	−11.1%
1911	2,750	−15.5%
1921	2,294	−16.6%
1931	2,185	−4.8%
1941	1,910	−12.6%

Year	Pop.	±%
1951	1,777	−7.0%
1956	1,749	−1.6%
1961	1,673	−4.3%
1966	1,471	−12.1%
1971	1,581	+7.5%
1976	1,787	+13.0%
1981	1,905	+6.6%
1986	2,086	+9.5%

Year	Pop.	±%
1991	2,591	+24.2%
1996	2,903	+12.0%
2001	3,099	+6.8%
2006	3,318	+7.1%
2011	3,391	+2.2%
2016	3,478	+2.6%
2021	3,571	+2.7%

Source: Statistics Canada

== See also ==
- List of townships in Ontario
