= Dufferin County =

- County (upper-tier)
- County of Dufferin
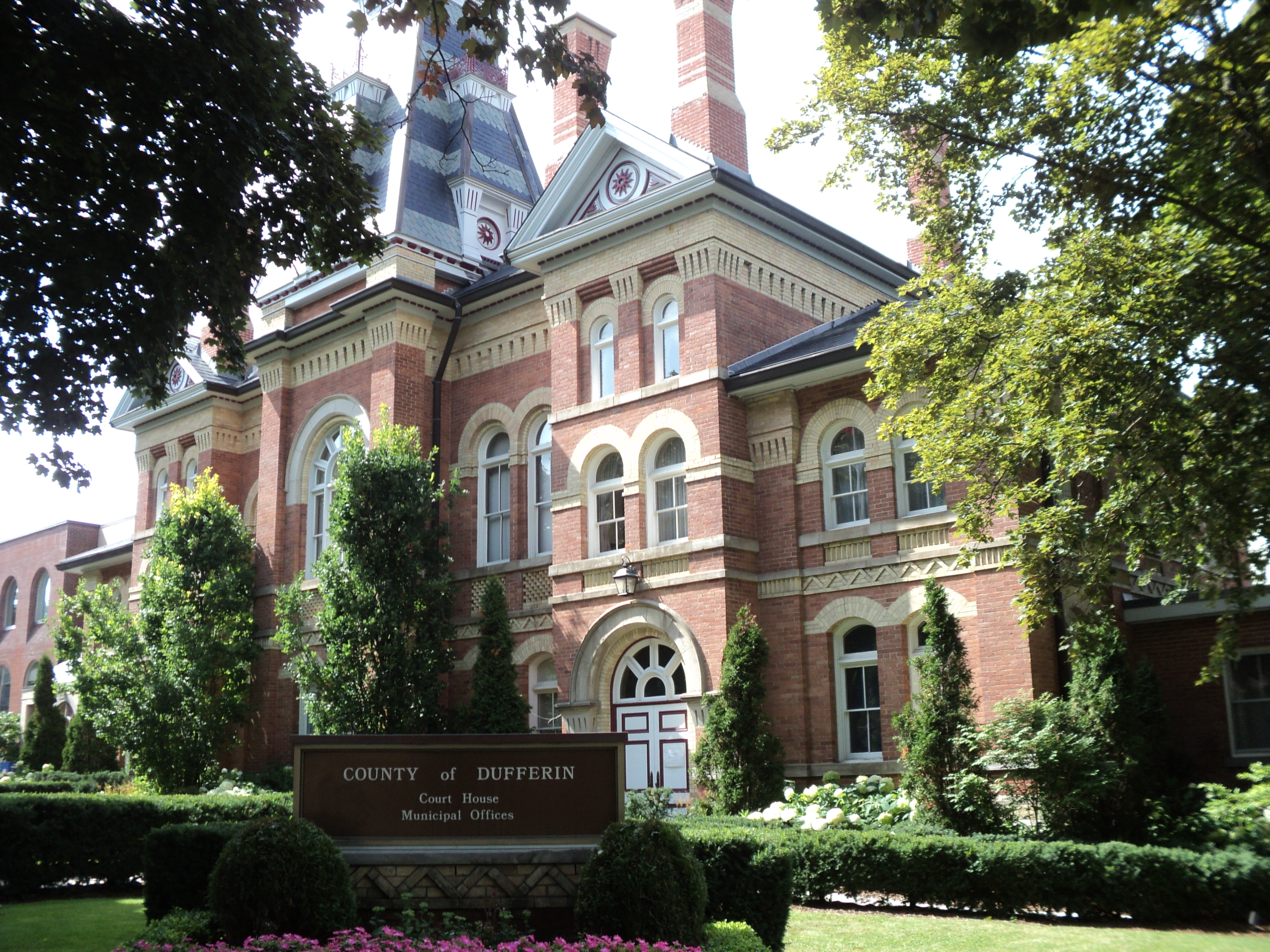
- Dufferin County Courthouse

- Seal

- Location of Dufferin County
- Coordinates: 44°03′43″N 80°11′03″W
- Country: Canada
- Province: Ontario
- County seat: Orangeville
- Municipalities: List: Town of Mono; Town of Orangeville; Town of Shelburne; Township of Amaranth; Township of East Garafraxa; Township of Grand Valley; Township of Melancthon; Township of Mulmur

Area
  - Land: 1,486.77 km^{2} (574.05 sq mi)

Population (2021)
  - Total: 66,257
  - Density: 44.6/km^{2} (116/sq mi)
- Time zone: UTC-5 (EST)
  - Summer (DST): UTC-4 (EDT)
- Website: www.dufferincounty.ca

Dufferin County is a county and census division located in Central Ontario, Canada. The county seat is Orangeville, and the current Warden is Janet Horner. The current chief administrative officer is Sonya Pritchard. Dufferin covers an area of 1,486.77 square kilometres (574.05 sq mi), and its population was 66,257 at the time of the 2021 Census.

== History ==
It was originally organized as the "Provisional County of Dufferin", with preparatory work authorized by the Legislative Assembly of Ontario in 1875 and the actual formation taking effect in 1881, being created from parts of the counties of Grey and Simcoe, on the north and east, and from the County of Wellington on the south and west.

Initial municipalities of Dufferin County
From	Formation (1881)	Extension (1883)
Grey County	Township of Melancthon; Village of Shelburne	
Simcoe County	Township of Mono; Township of Mulmur	
Wellington County	Township of Amaranth; Township of East Garafraxa; Town of Orangeville	Township of East Luther

The Village of Grand Valley was erected from East Luther in 1897, and the two municipalities amalgamated in 1995 to form the Township of East Luther Grand Valley, which was erected into the Town of Grand Valley in 2012.

The county gets its name from Frederick Hamilton-Temple-Blackwood, 1st Marquess of Dufferin and Ava, who was Governor General of Canada between 1872-1878. Originally an agriculturally based economy, Dufferin's economy has diversified to include commercial and retail businesses, industries related to residential and commercial construction (building, supplies, aggregates, real estate) and manufacturing. A portion of Dufferin’s economy still depends on agriculture but tourism is becoming more important as the county takes a more positive role in attracting visitors.

Historical townships
Township	Area	Origin
Amaranth	63,471 acres (99 sq mi; 257 km^{2})	Opened in 1821 and named from a common weed-plant (Amaranth) with green or purplish flowers, or it might be named after the "un-fading flower" of the classic poets. Settled mainly between 1840 and 1873. Communities were Orangeville, Laurel, Shelburne, Waldemar, Bowling Green
East Garafraxa	40,835 acres (64 sq mi; 165 km^{2})	Opened in 1821. Settled mostly between 1833 and 1850. (community centre, Marsville)
East Luther	38,599 acres (60 sq mi; 156 km^{2})	Settled mainly between 1860 and 1875. Community centres: Grand Valley, Monticello and Colbeck.
Melancthon	74,705 acres (117 sq mi; 302 km^{2})	Opened in 1821 and named after one of the leaders of the German Reformation (Philipp Melanchthon). A swampy township like East Luther so it was slow to be settled. Not generally settled until after 1850. Community centres: Melancthon, Corbetton, Riverview, Hornings Mills.
Mono		
Mulmur	70,291 acres (110 sq mi; 284 km^{2})	Opened in 1822. Origin of the name is forgotten, possibly a corruption of an Indigenous word or name. Settled mainly after 1867. Community centres: Mansfield, Honeywood, Terra Nova, Primrose.

== Geography ==
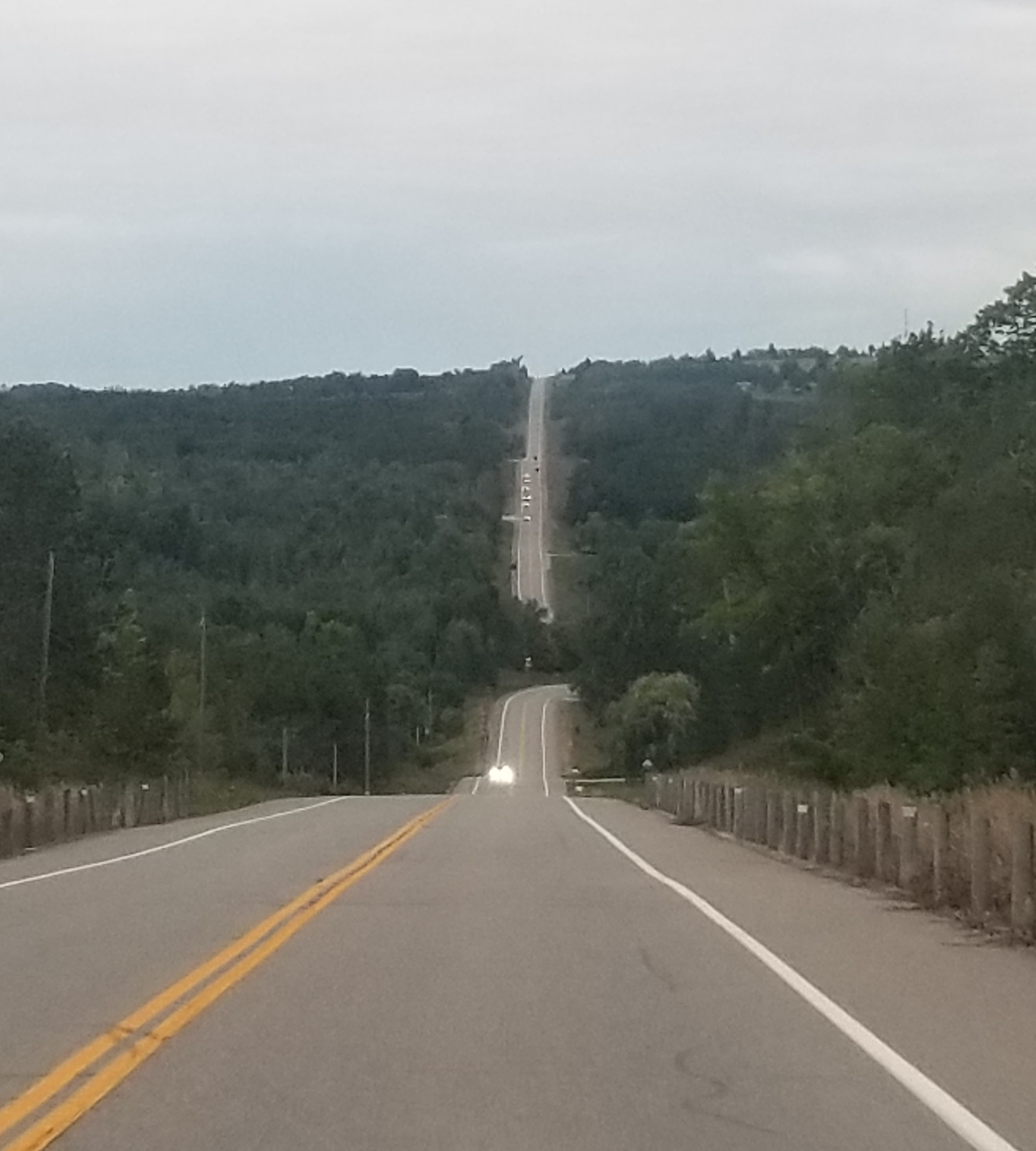
Airport Road passing through the hilly terrain of the Niagara Escarpment

Dufferin County is the highest plateau immediately south of Georgian Bay, and as such forms the watershed divide between the four lakes: Huron, Erie, Ontario and Simcoe. Four rivers — Saugeen, Grand, Credit and Nottawasaga — take their rise in Dufferin or in adjacent areas nearby and drain through the county.

The county is a lofty table-land that is about 518 metres (1,700 ft) above sea-level and about 427 metres (1,400 ft) above the level of downtown Toronto, as a result of being mostly situated in the Niagara Escarpment, although the highest peaks are still lower than the Blue Mountains north of Dufferin. The County of Dufferin, sits on the fringe of the Greater Toronto Area, about 100 kilometres (62 mi) northwest of Toronto. It is largely a rural county that contains three urban-centre towns; Grand Valley, Shelburne, and Orangeville. Orangeville, the county seat, is situated on the southern border of the county and is the largest urban centre, with just over half the population.

=== Climate ===
Climate data for Ruskview (Mulmur) Climate ID: 6147229; coordinates 44°14′N 80°08′W; elevation: 472.4 m (1,550 ft); 1981−2010 normals, extremes 1985–2006
Month	Jan	Feb	Mar	Apr	May	Jun	Jul	Aug	Sep	Oct	Nov	Dec	Year
Record high °C (°F)	13.5 (56.3)	12.0 (53.6)	22.5 (72.5)	28.5 (83.3)	31.5 (88.7)	33.0 (91.4)	34.0 (93.2)	35.0 (95.0)	33.0 (91.4)	28.0 (82.4)	20.0 (68.0)	16.0 (60.8)	35.0 (95.0)
Mean daily maximum °C (°F)	−3.6 (25.5)	−2.9 (26.8)	2.3 (36.1)	10.1 (50.2)	17.1 (62.8)	22.3 (72.1)	24.7 (76.5)	23.7 (74.7)	19.5 (67.1)	11.9 (53.4)	4.9 (40.8)	−1.3 (29.7)	10.7 (51.3)
Daily mean °C (°F)	−7.3 (18.9)	−6.8 (19.8)	−1.9 (28.6)	5.4 (41.7)	12.1 (53.8)	17.4 (63.3)	19.7 (67.5)	18.8 (65.8)	14.7 (58.5)	7.9 (46.2)	1.7 (35.1)	−4.3 (24.3)	6.4 (43.5)
Mean daily minimum °C (°F)	−10.9 (12.4)	−10.7 (12.7)	−6.0 (21.2)	0.8 (33.4)	7.0 (44.6)	12.4 (54.3)	14.7 (58.5)	13.9 (57.0)	9.9 (49.8)	3.8 (38.8)	−1.6 (29.1)	−7.3 (18.9)	2.2 (36.0)
Record low °C (°F)	−31.5 (−24.7)	−30.0 (−22.0)	−29.0 (−20.2)	−13.0 (8.6)	−3.5 (25.7)	2.0 (35.6)	5.0 (41.0)	4.0 (39.2)	−3.0 (26.6)	−7.0 (19.4)	−18.5 (−1.3)	−29.5 (−21.1)	−31.5 (−24.7)
Average precipitation mm (inches)	85.6 (3.37)	69.8 (2.75)	68.0 (2.68)	73.9 (2.91)	86.9 (3.42)	90.8 (3.57)	81.5 (3.21)	79.4 (3.13)	95.4 (3.76)	83.3 (3.28)	100.3 (3.95)	80.9 (3.19)	995.8 (39.20)
Average rainfall mm (inches)	21.1 (0.83)	15.7 (0.62)	31.2 (1.23)	60.7 (2.39)	86.7 (3.41)	90.8 (3.57)	81.5 (3.21)	79.4 (3.13)	95.4 (3.76)	73.8 (2.91)	60.8 (2.39)	21.0 (0.83)	718.0 (28.27)
Average snowfall cm (inches)	64.6 (25.4)	54.1 (21.3)	36.6 (14.4)	13.2 (5.2)	0.2 (0.1)	0.0 (0.0)	0.0 (0.0)	0.0 (0.0)	0.0 (0.0)	9.4 (3.7)	39.5 (15.6)	59.9 (23.6)	277.5 (109.3)
Average precipitation days (≥ 0.2 mm)	15.7	12.7	12.6	13.0	13.2	12.2	11.4	12.1	13.4	17.3	18.1	15.0	166.8
Average rainy days (≥ 0.2 mm)	3.2	3.0	6.0	11.5	13.2	12.2	11.4	12.1	13.5	16.5	12.5	4.1	119.1
Average snowy days (≥ 0.2 cm)	13.5	10.3	7.6	2.7	0.1	0.0	0.0	0.0	0.0	1.8	6.9	11.6	54.4
Source: Environment and Climate Change Canada

Climate data for Orangeville MOE Climate ID: 6155790; coordinates 43°55′06″N 80°05′11″W; elevation: 411.5 m (1,350 ft); 1981−2010 normals, extremes 1961–2006
Month	Jan	Feb	Mar	Apr	May	Jun	Jul	Aug	Sep	Oct	Nov	Dec	Year
Record high °C (°F)	14.5 (58.1)	13.0 (55.4)	22.5 (72.5)	28.5 (83.3)	32.0 (89.6)	34.0 (93.2)	35.0 (95.0)	35.5 (95.9)	33.0 (91.4)	28.3 (82.9)	22.8 (73.0)	18.0 (64.4)	35.5 (95.9)
Mean daily maximum °C (°F)	−3.4 (25.9)	−2.1 (28.2)	2.8 (37.0)	10.6 (51.1)	17.6 (63.7)	22.8 (73.0)	25.2 (77.4)	24.2 (75.6)	19.9 (67.8)	12.7 (54.9)	5.6 (42.1)	−0.6 (30.9)	11.3 (52.3)
Daily mean °C (°F)	−7.5 (18.5)	−6.5 (20.3)	−2.1 (28.2)	5.3 (41.5)	11.7 (53.1)	16.9 (62.4)	19.4 (66.9)	18.4 (65.1)	14.3 (57.7)	7.8 (46.0)	2.0 (35.6)	−4.1 (24.6)	6.3 (43.3)
Mean daily minimum °C (°F)	−11.6 (11.1)	−10.9 (12.4)	−7.0 (19.4)	0.0 (32.0)	5.7 (42.3)	10.9 (51.6)	13.5 (56.3)	12.6 (54.7)	8.7 (47.7)	3.0 (37.4)	−1.7 (28.9)	−7.5 (18.5)	1.3 (34.3)
Record low °C (°F)	−36.0 (−32.8)	−36.5 (−33.7)	−34.4 (−29.9)	−20.0 (−4.0)	−6.1 (21.0)	−2.2 (28.0)	0.6 (33.1)	−1.1 (30.0)	−5.6 (21.9)	−10.6 (12.9)	−18.0 (−0.4)	−33.0 (−27.4)	−36.0 (−32.8)
Average precipitation mm (inches)	64.3 (2.53)	54.5 (2.15)	60.9 (2.40)	70.1 (2.76)	86.6 (3.41)	81.3 (3.20)	80.8 (3.18)	88.2 (3.47)	87.0 (3.43)	76.6 (3.02)	87.1 (3.43)	64.2 (2.53)	901.5 (35.49)
Average rainfall mm (inches)	25.7 (1.01)	22.7 (0.89)	38.2 (1.50)	63.5 (2.50)	86.6 (3.41)	81.3 (3.20)	80.8 (3.18)	88.2 (3.47)	87.0 (3.43)	74.3 (2.93)	72.4 (2.85)	29.4 (1.16)	750.1 (29.53)
Average snowfall cm (inches)	38.5 (15.2)	31.8 (12.5)	22.7 (8.9)	6.6 (2.6)	0.0 (0.0)	0.0 (0.0)	0.0 (0.0)	0.0 (0.0)	0.0 (0.0)	2.3 (0.9)	14.7 (5.8)	34.9 (13.7)	151.5 (59.6)
Average precipitation days (≥ 0.2 mm)	14.3	10.9	11.3	12.2	12.9	11.9	10.5	11.9	12.2	14.3	14.6	14.1	151.0
Average rainy days (≥ 0.2 mm)	3.6	3.3	5.6	10.7	12.9	11.9	10.5	11.9	12.2	14.0	10.8	4.5	112.0
Average snowy days (≥ 0.2 cm)	11.3	8.1	6.2	1.9	0.0	0.0	0.0	0.0	0.0	0.8	4.5	10.0	42.8
Source: Environment and Climate Change Canada

== Demographics ==
As a census division in the 2021 Census of Population conducted by Statistics Canada, Dufferin County had a population of 66,257 living in 23,310 of its 24,388 total private dwellings, a change of 7.3% from its 2016 population of 61,735. With a land area of 1,486.77 km^{2} (574.05 sq mi), it had a population density of 44.6/km^{2} (115.4/sq mi) in 2021.

Historical census populations – Dufferin County

Year	Pop.	±%
1986	32,650	—
1991	39,897	+22.2%
1996	45,657	+14.4%
2001	51,013	+11.7%

Year	Pop.	±%
2006	54,436	+6.7%
2011	56,881	+4.5%
2016	61,735	+8.5%
2021	66,257	+7.3%

Source: Statistics Canada: 2016, 2011, 2006, 1996/2001, 1986/1991

Panethnic groups in Dufferin County (2001−2021)
Panethnic group	2021		2016		2011		2006		2001	
Panethnic group	Pop.	%	Pop.	%	Pop.	%	Pop.	%	Pop.	%
European (Note: Statistic includes all persons that did not make up part of a visible minority or an indigenous identity.)	53,700	82%	54,750	89.98%	52,590	93.77%	51,330	95.19%	48,305	95.92%
African	3,590	5.48%	1,595	2.62%	750	1.34%	660	1.22%	645	1.28%
South Asian	3,125	4.77%	1,245	2.05%	465	0.83%	580	1.08%	290	0.58%
Indigenous	1,395	2.13%	1,170	1.92%	695	1.24%	525	0.97%	445	0.88%
Southeast Asian (Note: Statistic includes total responses of "Filipino" and "Southeast Asian" under visible minority section on census.)	890	1.36%	625	1.03%	385	0.69%	165	0.31%	120	0.24%
Latin American	815	1.24%	405	0.67%	285	0.51%	160	0.3%	110	0.22%
East Asian (Note: Statistic includes total responses of "Chinese", "Korean", and "Japanese" under visible minority section on census.)	575	0.88%	375	0.62%	390	0.7%	310	0.57%	305	0.61%
Middle Eastern (Note: Statistic includes total responses of "West Asian" and "Arab" under visible minority section on census.)	470	0.72%	160	0.26%	45	0.08%	85	0.16%	50	0.1%
Other (Note: Statistic includes total responses of "Visible minority, n.i.e." and "Multiple visible minorities" under visible minority section on census.)	925	1.41%	520	0.85%	465	0.83%	105	0.19%	90	0.18%
Total responses	65,485	98.83%	60,845	98.56%	56,085	98.6%	53,925	99.06%	50,360	98.72%
Total population	66,257	100%	61,735	100%	56,881	100%	54,436	100%	51,013	100%
Note: Totals greater than 100% due to multiple origin responses

== Education ==
Upper Grand District School Board operates secular Anglophone public schools. The Dufferin-Peel Catholic District School Board operates Anglophone Catholic public schools. The Conseil scolaire Viamonde operates secular Francophone schools serving the area. The Conseil scolaire de district catholique Centre-Sud (CSDCCS) operates Catholic Francophone schools serving the area.

== Travel region ==
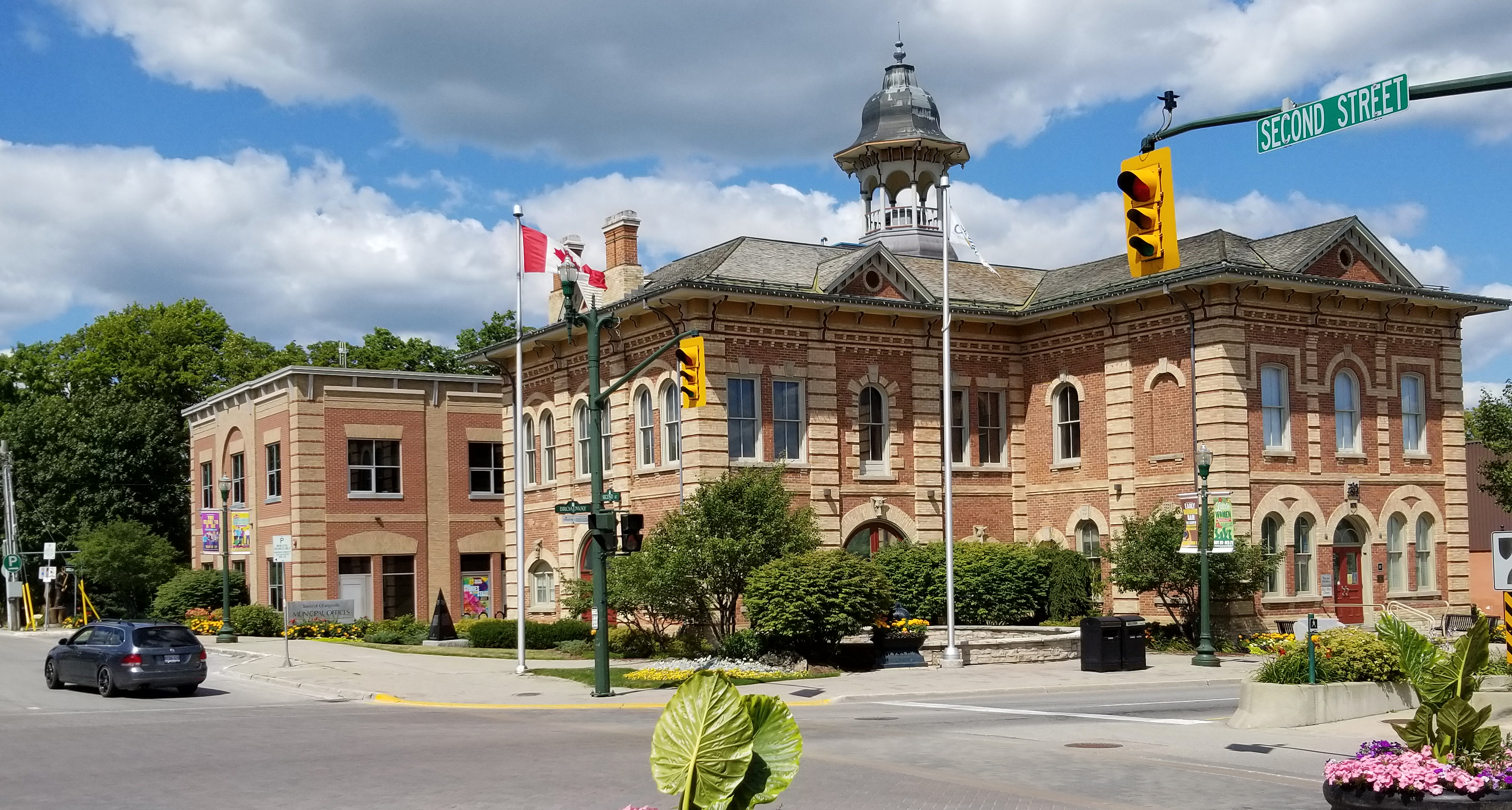
Built c.1871, the Orangeville Town Hall contains an opera hall, used by the Theatre Orangeville company

Dufferin County is part of two Ontario travel regions. Headwaters Tourism Association represents the county and the adjacent municipalities of Caledon and Erin. Central Counties of Ontario combines the Headwaters area and a larger adjacent region.

== See also ==
- List of municipalities in Ontario
- List of Ontario Census Divisions
- List of townships in Ontario
- Southern Ontario
