= Amaranth, Ontario =

Amaranth
- Township (lower-tier)
- Township of Amaranth
- Amaranth within the Dufferin County

- Location within Southern Ontario
- Coordinates: 43°59′N 80°14′W
- Country: Canada
- Province: Ontario
- County: Dufferin
- Incorporated: January 2, 1854

Government
  - Mayor: Chris Gerrits
  - Fed. riding: Dufferin—Caledon
  - Prov. riding: Dufferin—Caledon

Area
  - Land: 265.02 km^{2} (102.32 sq mi)

Population (2021)
  - Total: 4,327
  - Density: 16.3/km^{2} (42/sq mi)
- Time zone: UTC-5 (EST)
  - Summer (DST): UTC-4 (EDT)
- FSA: L9V & L9W
- Area code(s): 519, 226, 548
- Website: www.amaranth.ca

Amaranth is a township located in Dufferin County, Ontario, Canada, with a 2021 population of 4,327. It is named after the plant which grows abundantly within its borders. It is bordered by Mono to the east and East Luther to the west.

The hamlet of Laurel is located on the 5th Line (or County Road 12) and 10th Sideroad (or County Road 10). Laurelwoods Elementary School is located just outside this community, on the 6th Line and 10th Sideroad. The township building is also at this location, and has a park with baseball diamonds and soccer fields on its property.

Amaranth's system of naming roads is similar to that of the Dufferin County townships of Mono and Mulmur, and the Simcoe County townships of Adjala and Tosorontio. The system names roads running parallel to Highway 10 in Amaranth "Lines." Each is assigned a number from the town line westward in sequence. Roads running perpendicular to the Lines are numbered Sideroads, and are numbered using multiples of five ascending northward from County Road 109.

== Communities ==
The township of Amaranth comprises a number of villages and hamlets, including the following communities:

- Amaranth Station
- Blacks Corners
- Bowling Green
- Campania
- Crombie
- Farmington
- Fraxa
- Jessopville
- Laurel
- Laurel Station
- Maple Grove
- Waldemar
- Whittington
- Bates' Corners
- Coleridge
- Fern Bank
- Hall's Corners
- Kennedy's Corners
- Rich Hill
- The Gore

== Demographics ==
In the 2021 Census of Population conducted by Statistics Canada, Amaranth had a population of 4,327 living in 1,372 of its 1,428 total private dwellings, a change of 6.1% from its 2016 population of 4,079. With a land area of 265.02 km^{2} (102.32 sq mi), it had a population density of 16.3/km^{2} (42.3/sq mi) in 2021.

Canada census – Amaranth community profile

	2021	2011
Population	4,327 (+6.1% from 2016)	3,963 (+3.1% from 2006)
Land area	265.02 km^{2} (102.32 sq mi)	264.5 km^{2} (102.1 sq mi)
Population density	16.3/km^{2} (42/sq mi)	15.0/km^{2} (39/sq mi)
Median age	42.4 (M: 42.0, F: 43.2)	42.5 (M: 42.4, F: 42.5)
Private dwellings	1,428 (total) 1,372 (occupied)	1,312 (total)
Median household income	$127,000

References: 2021 2011

Historical census populations – Amaranth, Ontario

Year	Pop.	±%
1871	1,943	—
1881	2,914	+50.0%
1891	2,799	−3.9%
1901	2,798	−0.0%
1911	2,209	−21.1%
1921	1,907	−13.7%
1931	1,673	−12.3%
1941	1,602	−4.2%

Year	Pop.	±%
1951	1,581	−1.3%
1956	1,612	+2.0%
1961	1,643	+1.9%
1966	1,743	+6.1%
1971	1,957	+12.3%
1976	2,358	+20.5%
1981	2,643	+12.1%
1986	2,771	+4.8%

Year	Pop.	±%
1991	3,156	+13.9%
1996	3,450	+9.3%
2001	3,770	+9.3%
2006	3,845	+2.0%
2011	3,963	+3.1%
2016	4,079	+2.9%
2021	4,327	+6.1%

Population counts are not adjusted for boundary changes.
Source: Statistics Canada

== See also ==
- List of municipalities in Ontario
- List of townships in Ontario
