= Ontario Highway 131 =

Former Ontario provincial highway

Highway 131
- Townline Road, Simcoe County Road 27
- A map of Highway 131, highlighted in red (as of December 31, 1997)

Route information
- Maintained by County of Simcoe, City of Barrie
- Length: 6.7 km (4.2 mi)
- Existed: 1984–January 1, 1998

Major junctions
- South end: Highway 27 (Essa Road)
- North end: Highway 90 (Dunlop Street West)

Location
- Country: Canada
- Province: Ontario
- Counties: Simcoe
- Major cities: Barrie

Highway system
- Ontario provincial highways; Current; Former; 400-series
← Highway 130	→ Highway 132

Highway 131 was a provincially maintained highway in the Canadian province of Ontario, located in Simcoe County and the city of Barrie. The route, which connected Highway 27 with Highway 90, existed from 1984 until 1998, after which it was transferred to the responsibility of Simcoe County. Highway 131 was a straight rural highway, located west of Barrie's suburban fringe, though since then those suburbs have grown out to reach the former highway. Otherwise, the highway is abutted by the occasional farm and surrounded by several forests.

== Route description ==
Highway 131 facing north, south of Highway 90

Highway 131 began at an intersection with Highway 27 (Essa Road), travelling north through the outskirts of Barrie. Although the city of 125,000 residents lay immediately east of the highway, Highway 131 was a two lane road throughout its length. North of Highway 27, the route travelled north through farmland, then west of the suburb of Holly. North of Mapleview Drive, the route entered a forested area. After travelling through a valley, the highway met Ardagh Road. It crossed the newly commissioned Barrie Collingwood Railway and shortly thereafter ended at Highway 90 (Dunlop Street), which travelled east to Barrie and west to Angus and CFB Borden.

== History ==
The original Highway 131 was in Thunder Bay, ON. The city’s Harbour Expressway, built in 1979, was initially designated as Highway 131. However, it was downloaded to the Thunder Bay municipal government in 1981, freeing up the number 131 to be recycled. It was recycled four years later and assigned to this highway in Barrie, distant from its predecessor in Northern Ontario.

In 1984 or 1985, the Ministry of Transportation of Ontario (MTO) assumed ownership of Simcoe County Road 31. The purpose was to divert Georgian Bay and Wasaga Beach -bound traffic from Highway 26 in Downtown Barrie. Highway 131 remained unchanged throughout its existence.

As part of a series of budget cuts initiated by premier Mike Harris under his Common Sense Revolution platform in 1995, numerous highways deemed to no longer be of significance to the provincial network were decommissioned and responsibility for the routes transferred to a lower level of government, a process referred to as downloading. Highway 131 was downloaded in its entirety on January 1, 1998, and responsibility for the maintenance and signing of the route transferred to the County of Simcoe and City of Barrie. The route was redesignated as Simcoe County Road 27; the former route of Highway 27 into Barrie is now known as Essa Road.

== Major intersections ==
The following table lists the major junctions along Highway 131, as noted by the Ministry of Transportation of Ontario. The entire route is located in Simcoe County.

Location	km	mi	Destinations	Notes
Innisfil	0.0	0.0	Highway 27 – Toronto	Now Simcoe County Road 27 (Essa Road)
Barrie	6.7	4.2	Highway 90 – Barrie	Now Simcoe County Road 90 (Dunlop Street West)
1.000 mi = 1.609 km; 1.000 km = 0.621 mi

== See also ==
- York Regional Road 27
