= List of numbered roads in Simcoe County =

List of county roads

A list of current and former county roads in Simcoe County, Ontario, Canada.

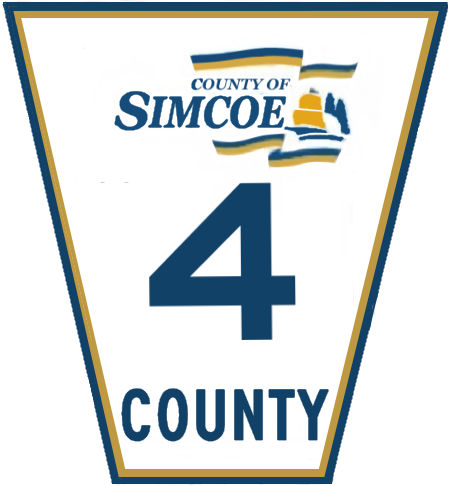
A newer-style Simcoe County Road shield.

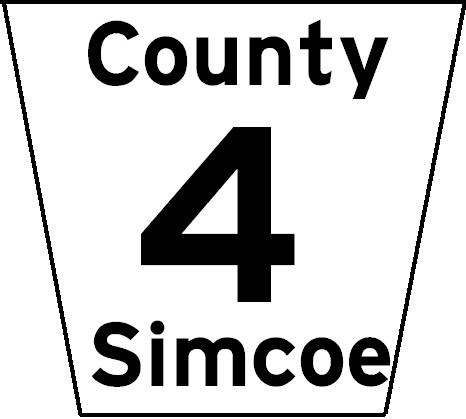
An older-style Simcoe County Road shield.

== Current county roads ==
The table below lists all currently existing county roads in commission.

| County road # | Local name(s) | Western/northern terminus (&) | Eastern/southern terminus (&) | Cities it passes by (within Simcoe County) | Additional notes/traffic |
|---|---|---|---|---|---|
| | 8th Line; Main Street | Simcoe County / Dufferin County Boundary | Simcoe County Road 27 | New Tecumseth; Bradford West Gwillimbury; Adjala–Tosorontio | Continues west as Dufferin County Road 7. Continues east as Bradford West Gwillimbury 8th Concession. |
| | Shores Acres Drive | Simcoe County Road 4 | Simcoe County Road 39 | Innisfil | |
| | Barrie Street; Yonge Street | Mapleview Drive East | Line 8 | Bradford West Gwillimbury; Innisfil | Formerly part of Ontario Highway 11 Extension of the original Yonge Street. CR 4 does not extend through Bradford to meet up with the northern terminus of York Regional Road 1 (the southward continuation of former Highway 11), which causes confusion to some drivers following the former highway. |
| | Simcoe County Road 5; Main Street Everett | Mulmur Tosorontio Townline Road/Dufferin County Road 17 Intersection (Simcoe County/Dufferin County Boundary) | Simcoe County Road 15 | Everett, Adjala-Tosorontio | |
| | Simcoe County Road 6 | Lafontaine Road | Simcoe County Road 27 | Wyevale, Perkinsfield, Tiny | |
| | Simcoe County Road 7 | Wasaga Beach/Clearview Boundary | Ontario Highway 26 | Clearview | |
| | Simcoe County Road 9; Louisa Street | Simcoe County Road 124/Grey County Road 124 | Simcoe County Road 10 | New Lowell, Creemore, Springwater, Clearview, Cashtown Corners, Dunedin | |
| | Queen Street; Tottenham Road; Mill Street; Brentwood Road; Sunnidale Road | Wasaga Beach/Clearview Boundary | Highway 9 | New Tecumseth; Essa; Clearview | Road is split into 2 portions. First portion goes from Highway 9 to Simcoe County Road 90 in Angus. Follow Simcoe County Road 90 east to access the second portion from Simcoe County Road 90 to Wasaga Beach |
| | Old Barrie Road | Simcoe County Road 93 | Ontario Highway 11/Ontario Highway 12 South interchange | Orillia, Oro–Medonte | |
| | Simcoe County Road 12; Main Street Lisle | Mulmur-Tosorontio Townline (Simcoe County/Dufferin County Boundary) | Simcoe County Road 13 | Adjala-Tosorontio, Lisle, Airlie | Originally had an eastern terminus of Canadian Forces Base Borden |
| | Simcoe County Road 13 | Main Street Lisle | Ontario Highway 89 | Everett, Lisle, Adjala-Tosorontio | |
| | 5th Line | Simcoe County Road 50 | Ontario Highway 400 | New Tecumseth; Adjala–Tosorontio;Bradford West Gwillumbury | Original Eastern terminus of Simcoe County Road 10. New Eastern terminus became Highway 400 when new interchange between Highway 400 and Line 5 opened December 19, 2018. Road separated in two portions. 1st portion runs from County Road 50 to County Road 10. Second portion runs from County Road 27 to Highway 400. |
| | King Street North | Canadian Forces Base Borden | Ontario Highway 89 | Essa | |
| | Simcoe County Road 16 | Highway 12/Highway 400 Interchange | Highway 12/Sturgeon Bay Road Intersection | Tiny, Coldwater, Waubaushene | Former Route of Highway 12 before it ran concurrent with Highway 400 between Exits 141 and 147 |
| | Upper Big Chute Road; River Street | Big Chute Marine Railway Crossing (Simcoe County/Muskoka Region Boundary) | Sturgeon Bay Road, Coldwater | Severn Falls, Coldwater, Severn Township | |
| | Queen Street East; South Orr Lake Road; Moonstone Road | Simcoe County Road 27 | Ontario Highway 12 | Moonstone, Orr Lake, Elmvale, Oro-Medonte, Springwater | Continuation of CR 92 |
| | Shanty Bay Road; Ridge Road; Oro-Medonte Line 11 | Barrie/Oro-Medonte Town Boundary | Ontario Highway 11 | Oro–Medonte | |
| | Innisfil Beach Road; Robert Street; Murphy Road | Simcoe County Road 15 | 20th Sideroad | Innisfil | Road is split into 2 portions. First portion is from Simcoe County Road 15 to Simcoe County Road 27 in Thornton. Follow Simcoe County Road 27 north to access second portion of road from Simcoe County Road 27 to Simcoe County Road 39. |
| | Horseshoe Valley Road | Ontario Highway 26 | Ontario Highway 12 | Springwater; Oro-Medonte | Horseshoe Valley Road is considered Horseshoe Valley Road West from Highway 26 to Simcoe County Road 93 and is Horseshoe Valley Road East from Simcoe County Road 93 to Highway 12. |
| | Vasey Road | Ontario Highway 93 | Ontario Highway 400/Ontario Highway 12 | Waverley, Vasey, Coldwater, Tay, Oro-Medonte | Runs along the border of Tay Township and Oro-Medonte Township |
| | Balm Beach Road | Simcoe County Road 6 | Simcoe County Road 93 | Midland, Tiny, Perkinsfield | |
| | Lafontaine Road | Cedar Point Road | Robert Street West (Penetanguishene/Tiny Township Town Boundary) | Penetanguishene, Lafontaine, Tiny | |
| | Highway 27 | Ontario Highway 93 | Highway 9 | New Tecumseth; Bradford West Gwillimbury; Innisfil; Essa; Elmvale | Former Hwy. 27. Split into 2 portions. First portion from Highway 9 to Simcoe County Road 90. Second portion is from Midhurst (Bayfield Street/Highway 26 intersection) to Waverley. |
| | George Johnston Road | Highway 26 | Simcoe County Road 90 | Springwater | |
| | Crossland Road | Horseshoe Valley Road | Concession Road 4 W, Tiny Township | Crossland, Allenwood, Gibson, Springwater | |
| Simcoe Road 32 | Sixth Street, Poplar Sideroad, Nottawasaga Concession 10 North | Simcoe County Road 34/Grey County Road 19 (Simcoe County/Grey County Boundary) | Ontario Highway 26 | Clearview, Collingwood | |
| | Osler Bluff Road | Highway 26 | Grey County Road 19/Collingwood Clearview Townline intersection | | Follows boundary between Simcoe County and Grey County. Concurrently known as Grey County Road 19 |
| | Sunnidale Road; Pinegrove Road | Simcoe County Road 90 | Barrie/Springwater Town Boundary | Springwater | Road was shortened in distance when County Road 90 was widened to five lanes and to accommodate new traffic light controlled intersection at County Road 56. |
| | Airport Road (Former) | Highway 26 | Simcoe County/ Dufferin County Boundary | | Links Simcoe County with Toronto Pearson International Airport. One of the busiest rural roads in Simcoe County. |
| | Snow Valley Drive | George Johnston Road | Highway 26 | Springwater | |
| Simcoe Road 44 | Rama Road | Simcoe County Road 169 | Highway 12 | Rama | |
| Simcoe Road 45 | Monck Road | Rama Road | Simcoe County Road 46; Simcoe County/Kawartha Lakes Boundary | Ramara | |
| Simcoe Road 46 | Kirkfield Road; Simcoe County Road 46 | Simcoe County Road 169 | Simcoe County/Kawartha Lakes Boundary | Ramara | |
| Simcoe Road 47 | Mara Carden Boundary Road; Simcoe County Road 47 | Ontario Highway 12 | Simcoe County/Kawartha Lakes Boundary | Ramara | |
| Simcoe Road 49 | Memorial Avenue | Ontario Highway 11/Oro-Medonte Line 15 Interchange | Woodland Drive (Orillia/Oro-Medonte Boundary) | Oro–Medonte; Orillia | |
| | Simcoe County Road 50 | Ontario Highway 89 | Highway 9, or the Simcoe County/Peel Region Boundary | Adjala–Tosorontio | Formerly Highway 50. |
| Simcoe Road 52 | Coopers Falls Road | Ontario Highway 11 | Simcoe County/Kawartha Lakes Boundary | Ramara | Continues as Kawartha City Road 6 |
| Simcoe Road 53 | Wilson Drive; Ferndale Drive North; 5th Sideroad Innisfil; 5th Sideroad Bradford West Gwillimbury | Ontario Highway 26 | Simcoe County Road 88 | Springwater, Bradford West Gwillimbury, Innisfil | Road split into two portions. First portion runs from Ontario Highway 26 to Barrie/Springwater town boundaries. Second portion runs from Barrie/Innisfil town boundaries to Simcoe County Road 88. |
| Simcoe Road 54 | Huronia Road, 10th Sideroad | Barrie/Innisfil Townline | 8th Concession | Bradford West Gwillimbury, Innisfil | |
| Simcoe Road 56 | Simcoe County Road 56 | Simcoe County Road 90 | Ontario Highway 89 | Essa | |
| Simcoe Road 58 | Old Fort Road | Ontario Highway 12 | Vasey Road | Vasey, Tay | |
| Simcoe Road 64 | 30/31 Sideroad Nottawasaga | Ontario Highway 26 | Site 10 Nottawasaga Landfill | Clearview | |
| | Simcoe County Road 88 | Simcoe County Road 27 | 10th Sideroad | Bradford West Gwillimbury | Formerly Ontario Highway 88 |
| | Simcoe County Road 89 | Highway 400 | Simcoe County Road 4 | Innisfil | Extension of Ontario Highway 89 |
| | Mill Street; Simcoe County Road 90 | Mill Street/Canadian Forces Base Borden | Barrie/Essa Town Boundary | Essa | Formerly Ontario Highway 90 |
| | Simcoe County Road 91 | Simcoe County Road 95/Grey County Road 31(Grey County/Simcoe County Boundary) | Ontario Highway 26 | Stayner, Duntroon, Clearview | Formerly Ontario Highway 91 for portion between Stayner and Duntroon |
| Simcoe Road 92 | Simcoe County Road 92; Queen Street | Wasaga Beach/Springwater Boundary | Simcoe County Road 27 | Wasaga Beach, Springwater, Elmvale | Formerly Highway 92. Highway 92 continued west through Wasaga Beach and terminated at Highway 26. Continues east as CR 19 |
| Simcoe Road 93 | Penetanguishene Road | Robert Street | Springwater/Oro-Medonte/Barrie Townline | Springwater, Midland, Dalston, Penetanguishene, Craighurst | Formerly Ontario Highway 93, Split into 2 sections (First Section from Barrie to Highway 400/Highway 93 interchange, Second portion from Highway 12 to Penetanguishene) |
| Simcoe Road 95 | Osprey-Clearview Townline Road | Grey County Road 31/Osprey-Clearview Townline Road intersection | Simcoe County Road 124/Grey County Road 124 | Clearview | Follows Simcoe County/Grey County Boundary. Concurrently labeled as Grey County Road 31. |
| Simcoe Road 96 | Nottawasaga Sideroad 27/28 | Ontario Highway 26 | Simcoe County Road 7 | Clearview | |
| | Simcoe County Road 124, Hurontario Street | Collingwood/Clearview Boundary | Nottawasaga/Mulmur Townline Road, Dufferin County (Simcoe County/Grey County/Dufferin County Boundary) | Collingwood, Duntroon, Nottawa, Clearview, Singhampton | Formerly Ontario Highway 24, shares portion of road between Singhampton and Nottawasaga/Mulmur Townline with Grey County (Concurrently labeled as Simcoe County Road 124/Grey County Road 124). |
| Simcoe Road 169 | Simcoe County Road 169 | Ontario Highway 11 | Ontario Highway 12 | Washago | Formerly Ontario Highway 169. |

== Former county roads ==
The following table list county roads that once existed, but were decommissioned, and transferred to local municipalities.

| County road # | Local name(s) | Western/northern terminus (&) | Eastern/southern terminus (&) | Cities it passes by (within Simcoe County) | Additional notes/traffic |
|---|---|---|---|---|---|
| | Canal Road | South of Grencer Road | Highway 9 | Bradford West Gwillimbury | Downloaded to the town of Bradford West Gwillimbury sometime in the 2010s. Old signage for the route can still be found on the road. |
| | West Street;Burnside Line | | | Orillia; Port Severn | |
| Simcoe Road 24 | Big Bay Point Road | 20th Sideroad | 25th Sideroad | Innisfil | |
| Simcoe Road 30 | Essa Road | Athabaska Road | Simcoe County Road 27 | Barrie; | Downloaded to the expanded city of Barrie as of January 1, 2010., No longer signed as Simcoe County Road 30. |
| Simcoe Road 33 | Nottawasaga Sideroad 33/34 | Simcoe County Road 34/Grey County Road 19 (Simcoe County/Grey County Boundary) | Simcoe County Road 124 | Clearview | Decommissioned and no longer signed as Simcoe County Road 33 |
| Simcoe Road 37 | Talbot Street | Paradise Point | Highway 12 | Port McNicoll | Decommissioned. Formerly the access road to Port McNicoll from Ontario Highway 12 |
| Simcoe Road 38 | South Sparrow Lake Road | | Highway 11 | Orillia; Port Severn; | Decommissioned. Only indication that road was formerly a county road is signage on Ontario Highway 11 |
| | 20th Sideroad | Simcoe County Road 21 | Shore Acres Road | Innisfil | |
| Simcoe Road 41 | Simcoe Road | 6th Concession | Canal Road | Bradford West Gwillimbury | |
| Simcoe Road 51 | Talbot Road | Talbot River bridge (terminus of Durham Regional Road 51 / Talbot Road) | Concession Road A | Brechin, Ontario | Road was the former route of Ontario Highway 12 |
| Simcoe Road 55 | 15th Sideroad New Tecumseth | | Ontario Highway 9 | New Tecumseth | No longer signed. Only indication that road was formerly a county road is signage on Ontario Highway 9. |
| Simcoe Road 57 | Oro–Medonte Line 3 | | | Oro–Medonte | Often referred to as Gasoline Alley, for there are many gas stations and pumps along the intersection of this road and Highway 11 |
| Simcoe Road 59 | Quarry Road | Ontario Highway 400 | | | No longer signed. Only indication that road was formerly a county road is signage on Ontario Highway 400 |
| Simcoe Road 60 | River Road East, Tiny Beaches Road South, Concession Road 4 West | Main Street, Wasaga Beach | Simcoe County Road 6 | Wasaga Beach, Tiny | Former county road, no longer signed. Some GPS systems may still refer to road(s) as County Road 60 |
