= Smart Bros. Ltd. =

Canadian agricultural company, 1890–1970

Smart Bros. Ltd. was a Canadian agricultural, horticultural, and food processing company based in Collingwood, Ontario. Founded in 1890 as a market gardening business, the family-owned company expanded into fruit and vegetable production, canning, and food distribution. At its peak, Smart Bros. Ltd. was one of Collingwood's largest employers and one of Ontario's largest fruit and vegetable producers. The company operated until 1970 and played a significant role in the economic development of Collingwood.

== History ==
=== Founding ===
Smart Bros. Ltd. traces its origins to 1890, when retired Northern Railway conductor John Smart purchased a seven-acre farm on Campbell Street in Collingwood with his son, Norman. In 1892, another son, George (W.G.) Smart, joined the business and the brothers assumed management. Initially established as a market garden, the business expanded through the acquisition of additional farmland for the cultivation of fruits, vegetables, and flowers.

=== Expansion ===
During the early twentieth century, Smart Bros. Ltd. expanded from agricultural production into food processing and canning. After outgrowing its original Campbell Street cannery, the company constructed a larger facility in 1925 at the corner of First and Hurontario Streets with direct railway access for shipping products throughout Canada and overseas. The company also developed an extensive drainage system that enabled the construction of greenhouses and the expansion of commercial flower production, and in 1950 it developed a high grade irrigation system for their crops, capable of pumping approximately 250 gallons (950 L) of water per minute. At its peak, the company operated approximately 500 acres of farmland and produced more than 120 products. Its products were exported to markets including the United Kingdom and West Germany. Products included canned peas, beans, tomatoes, rhubarb, asparagus, apples, pickles, preserves, and cut flowers.

=== Employment and economic impact ===
Smart Bros. Ltd. became one of Collingwood's largest employers. During peak production, the company employed more than 500 workers across its farming, canning, greenhouse, floral, and transportation operations. The company continued to provide employment throughout the Great Depression and purchased produce from local farmers, contributing to the regional economy. Women formed much of the cannery workforce, while students commonly worked seasonally harvesting fruits and vegetables.

=== Decline ===
Following changes in ownership and management, Smart Bros. Ltd. was sold to Canada Vinegars in 1964. Although plans initially called for continued operation and expansion, the business gradually declined, and its corporate charter was dissolved in 1970.

== Legacy ==
Although Smart Bros. Ltd. ceased operations in 1970, several former Smart Bros. buildings, including the original cannery and rhubarb house, remain in Collingwood, while interpretive panels commemorate the company's history. In 2025, the Collingwood Museum presented Growing Roots: The Legacy of Smart Bros. Ltd. in Collingwood, 1890–1970, an exhibition highlighting the company's history, followed by a permanent display and a self-guided heritage driving tour.
