= Ontario Highway 90 =

Former Ontario provincial highway

King's Highway 90

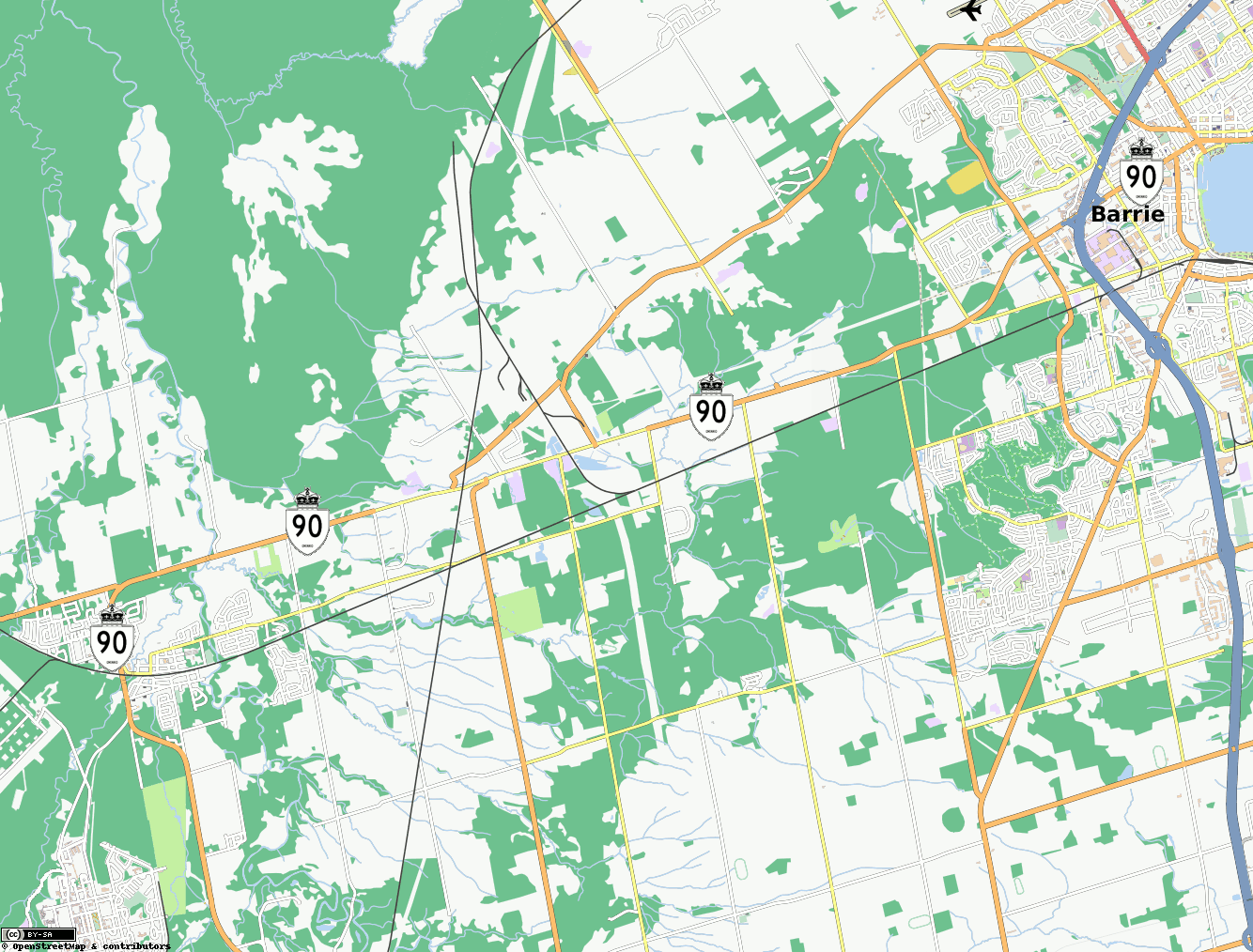

Route information
- Maintained by the Ministry of Transportation of Ontario
- Length: 19.0 km (11.8 mi)
- Existed: October 6, 1937–January 1, 1998

Major junctions
- West end: Camp Borden Road in Angus (continues south as Simcoe County Road 10)
- Highway 131
- East end: Highway 11 / Highway 27 (Bradford Street) in Barrie

Location
- Country: Canada
- Province: Ontario
- Major cities: Barrie
- Towns: Angus

Highway system
- Ontario provincial highways; Current; Former; 400-series
← Highway 89	→ Highway 93
Former provincial highways
← Highway 88	Highway 91 →

King's Highway 90, commonly referred to as Highway 90, was a provincially maintained highway in the Canadian province of Ontario. The route connected Barrie with the town of Angus and CFB Borden. The highway was designated in 1937. During the early 1960s, the highway was realigned within Barrie in order to have it interchange with Highway 400; originally the route followed Tiffin Street. At the beginning of 1998, the entire highway was transferred to the City of Barrie and Simcoe County; it is now known as Simcoe County Road 90.

== Route description ==
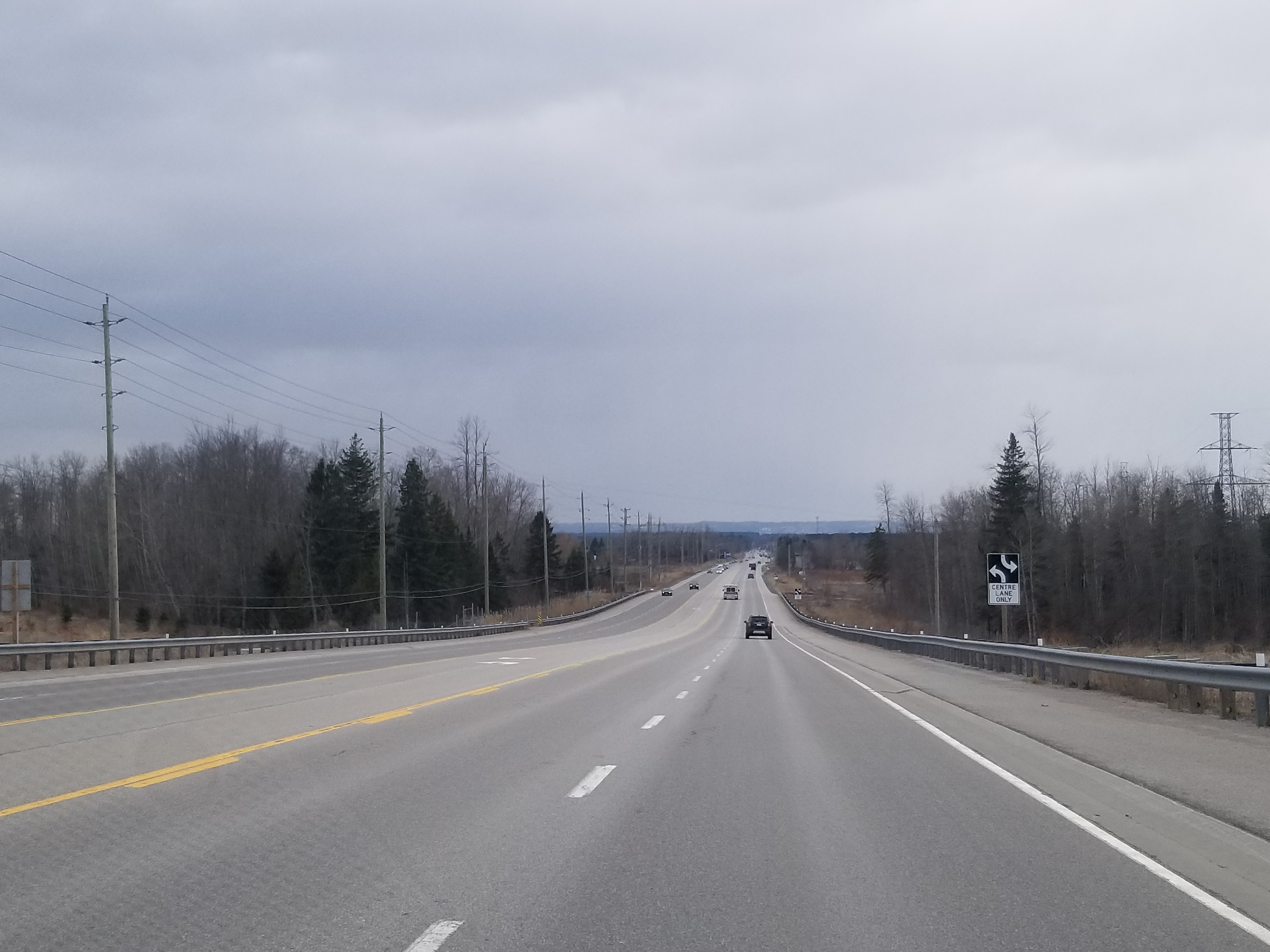
Simcoe County Road 90 (former Hwy. 90) east of Angus

Highway 90 ended at the entrance to CFB Borden, for which it serves as the primary connection to Highway 400

Today, the former Highway 90 is known as Simcoe County Road 90 outside of Barrie, and (as it was during its status as a provincial highway) Dunlop Street within Barrie. The route begins at a split between Cambrai Road, which provides access to Camp Borden, and Simcoe County Road 10, which continues south to Alliston and Tottenham. The four lane Simcoe County Road 90 progresses north through the centre of Angus. North of the Barrie Collingwood Railway overhead, it acts as the principal commercial strip for the town. North of Angus, the highway makes a broad 90-degree turn to the east and skims the southern edge of the Minesing Wetlands, an internationally significant bog.

East of the swamp, the road enters Essa, where it intersects the Sunnidale Road (Simcoe County Road 40). From there to Barrie, the highway passes through a largely rural area. It intersects former Highway 131, now Simcoe County Road 27, then enters Barrie at Miller Drive, curving northeast. East of Ferndale Drive, the route crosses Highway 400 at Exit 96. Shortly thereafter, as it approaches the waterfront of Kempenfelt Bay, the route ends at High Street in downtown Barrie.

Simcoe County Road 90 is two lanes wide between McKinnon Road, north of Angus, and Ferndale Drive in Barrie, although a passing lane is provided for eastbound traffic between Angus and Essa. The road also widens to four lanes briefly at the junction with former Highway 131 west of Barrie, as well as within the city and within Angus. The land use surrounding the route is mixed, with pastures and forests composing the majority of the setting. Residences and small businesses are also scattered throughout the length of the route.

== History ==
Highway 90 was originally assumed by the Department of Highways (DHO), the predecessor to today's Ministry of Transportation of Ontario (MTO), during the late 1930s. The primary purpose for the highway was to connect the CFB Borden military base at Angus with the main north–south routes of central Ontario. At that time, these were Highway 27 and Highway 11. On October 6, 1937, the DHO designated the Barrie to Angus Road as King's Highway 90. The initially unimproved road was paved shortly after the outbreak of World War II; a contract was awarded to Brennan Paving of Hamilton during the autumn of 1939, and work completed by the end of the year.

Initially, Highway 90 followed Tiffin Street through Barrie, ending just short of the waterfront of Kempenfelt Bay at the intersection of Essa Street (Highway 27) and Bradford Street (Highway 11/27).

Highway 90 approaching Barrie from the west

However, during the early 1960s the route was modified so as to provide an interchange with Highway 400. A new interchange was constructed during the late 1950s at what was then known as Elizabeth Street in order to provide better access to downtown Barrie from the freeway. By 1960, Highway 90 had been rerouted northwest along Ferndale Drive and northeast along Elizabeth Street. Though it still ended at Bradford Street, it intersected it 1.5 kilometres (0.93 mi) to the north.

By 1961, Elizabeth Street was renamed as Dunlop Street West. By 1964, Dunlop Street was extended southwest of Ferndale Drive to merge with Tiffin Street at Miller Drive (the present city limits).

The highway remained unchanged for over three decades, with the exception of a Connecting Link agreement established between the MTO and the City of Barrie. However, during the late 1990s, the MTO transferred many highways to lower levels of government as a cost-cutting measure. Highway 90 was transferred to Simcoe County on January 1, 1998. The Connecting Link through Barrie was also discontinued. Simcoe County has since renamed its portion of the route as Simcoe County Road 90.

== Major intersections ==
The following table lists the major junctions along Highway 90, as noted by the Ministry of Transportation of Ontario.

Division	Location	km	mi	Destinations	Notes
Simcoe	Angus	0.0	0.0	County Road 10 south	Roadway continues south as Camp Borden Road
Simcoe	Angus	1.8	1.1	County Road 10 north (Brentwood Road) – Wasaga Beach	
Simcoe	Essa–Springwater	7.4	4.6	County Road 56 south	
Simcoe	Essa–Springwater	12.1	7.5	County Road 28 north (George Johnston Road)	
Simcoe	Essa–Springwater	13.9	8.6	Former Highway 131 south	Now Simcoe County Road 27
Simcoe	Essa–Barrie	14.9	9.3		Barrie city limits; beginning of Connecting Link agreement
Barrie		14.9	9.3		Barrie city limits; beginning of Connecting Link agreement
Barrie		17.4	10.8	Highway 400 – Toronto	Exit 96
Barrie		19.0	11.8	Highway 11 / Highway 27 (Bradford Street)	End of Connecting Link agreement
1.000 mi = 1.609 km; 1.000 km = 0.621 mi

== Current construction ==
The current construction to widen the highway to 5 lanes could last until 2020.
