= Colltrans =

Transit system in Ontario, Canada

COLLTRANS
- Parent: Town of Collingwood, Engineering Dept.
- Headquarters: 97 Hurontario St.
- Locale: Collingwood, ON
- Service type: bus service
- Routes: 5
- Fleet: 8
- Fuel type: biodiesel
- Operator: Sinton Transportation
- Website: COLLTRANS

Colltrans is the municipal transit system in the Town of Collingwood in Central Ontario, Canada. Although this is a small system, running only three routes on 30 minute loops from the downtown terminal, it provides service to the community seven days a week, with the exception of statutory holidays. The terminal is an outdoor curbside location on the southeast corner of Second Street and Pine Street with no facilities other than two bus shelters. Fares are $2.00, with students receiving a 50 cent discount and children riding for free.

== Services ==
There are three routes that operate Monday to Sunday from 7:00 am to 9:00 pm. In addition, there are also two other non-Colltrans routes; one operated by Simcoe County LINX, which connect to other communities in Simcoe County such as Wasaga Beach and The Blue Mountains.

- Crosstown Route- Via Cranberry Trail, Hwy 26, First/Second Streets, Hume/Ontario Streets, Pretty River Parkway
- East Route- Via Paul Street, Simcoe Street, Raglan Street, Erie Street, Peel Street, Gooden Street, Lockhart Road, Hurontario Street, Patterson Street
- West Route- Via Third Street, Balsam Street, High Street, Fifth Street, Tenth Street, Campbell Street, Cameron Street, Maple Street

=== Other services ===
- Collingwood-Blue Mountain Link
- Simcoe County LINX - Route 4 Collingwood-Wasaga Beach.

== Fleet ==
All buses are wheelchair accessible and have bike racks.

- 2 - Eldorado E-Z Rider II
- 2 - NFI XD40
- 1 - ADL Enviro 200
- 2 - NFI MD30
- 1 - Ford Girardin G5

== See also ==
- Public transport in Canada
