= Hurontario Street =

Road in Ontario, Canada

Hurontario Street Main Street Centre Road Lavender Hill Road Concession 8
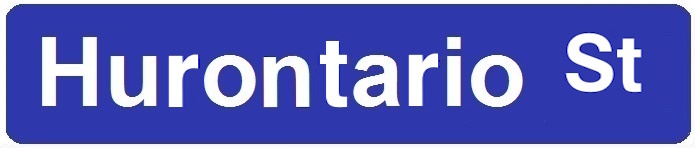
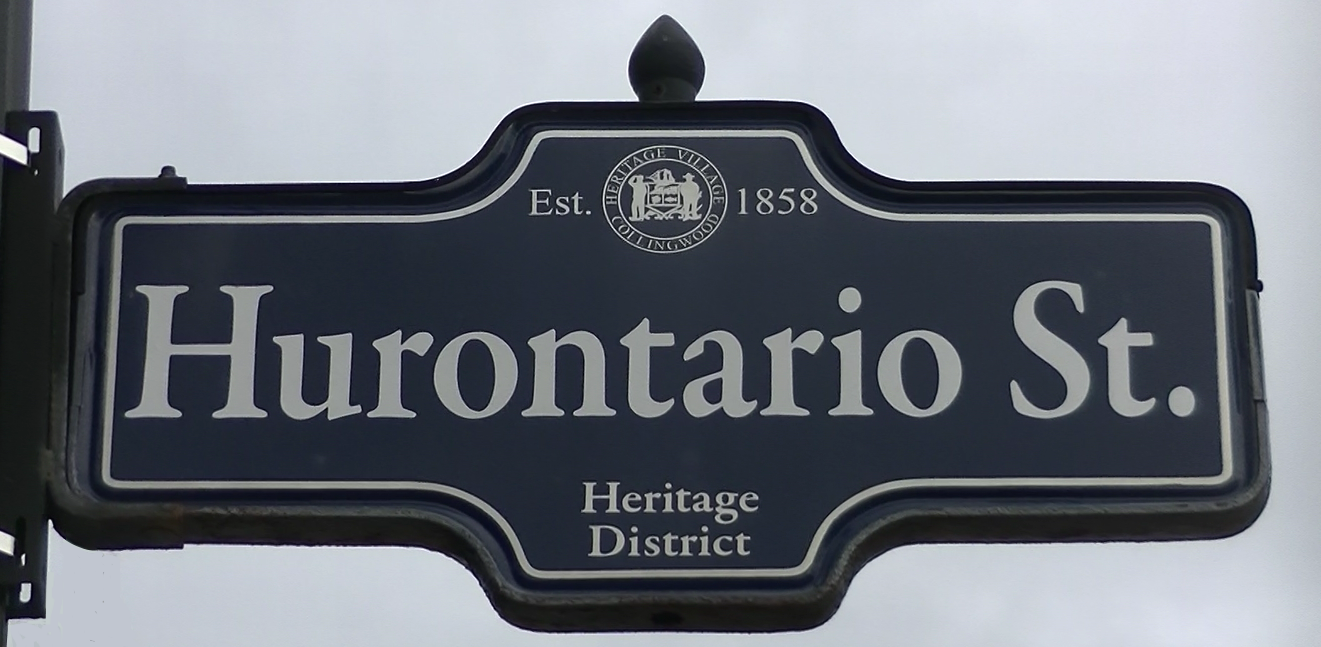
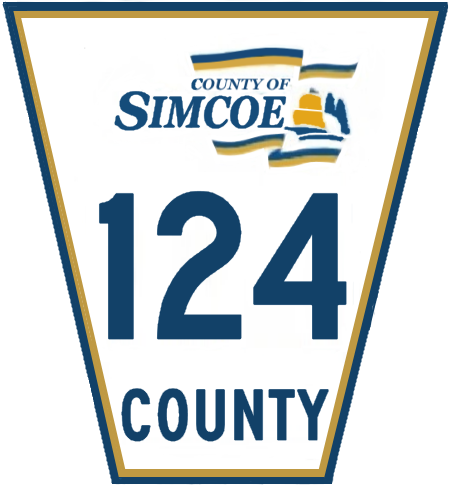
- Highway 10; Simcoe County Road 124
- Map of Hurontario Street
- Namesake: Lake Huron and Lake Ontario
- Maintained by: City of Mississauga; City of Brampton; Ontario Ministry of Transportation; Town of Orangeville; Town of Mono; Township of Mulmur; Township of Clearview; Simcoe County; Town of Collingwood
- Location: Mississauga; Brampton; Caledon; Orangeville; Mono; Collingwood
- South end: Lakeshore Road in Mississauga
- Major junctions: Queen Elizabeth Way; Queensway; Dundas Street; Burnhamthorpe Road; Highway 403; Eglinton Avenue; Britannia Road; Highway 401; Derry Road; 407 ETR; Steeles Avenue; Queen Street; Bovaird Drive; Highway 410; Charleston Sideroad; Highway 9; — Name/Course break —; Hockley Road; Highway 89; County Road 9; County Road 124 (Resumes as); Simcoe Road 91; Highway 26 (First/Huron Streets)
- North end: Side Launch Way in Collingwood

Construction
- Inauguration: 1818

Other
Nearby arterial roads
← Mavis Road / Chinguacousy Road; Simcoe Road 124 (North of Shelburne)	Cawthra Road; Highway 403; Highway 410; Dixie Road; Airport Road →

Hurontario Street is a roadway running in Ontario, Canada between Lake Ontario at Mississauga and Lake Huron's Georgian Bay at Collingwood. Within Peel Region, it is a major urban thoroughfare within the cities of Mississauga and Brampton, which serves as the divide from which cross-streets are split into East and West, except at its foot in the historic Mississauga neighbourhood of Port Credit. Farther north, with the exception of the section through Simcoe County, where it forms the 8th Concession, it is the meridian for the rural municipalities it passes through. In Dufferin County, for instance, parallel roads are labelled as EHS or WHS for East (or West) of Hurontario Street.

Provincial Highway 10 follows the road through Caledon as far north as Orangeville. The highway designation formerly continued south through Brampton and Mississauga, but the highway was downloaded to both cities in 1997 due to its increasingly urbanized nature and the presence of the 400-series Highways 410 and 403. Highway 24 followed much of the street's northern section (as well as the central section where it ran concurrently with Highway 10) from near Glen Huron to Collingwood, but was also downloaded (to Simcoe County), as it was deemed by the province to be of insufficient importance to be retained in the highway system, and is now known as Simcoe County Road 124 through that stretch.

In addition to these two highways that followed most of its course, Highways 7 and 26 jogged along it for short distances through Brampton and Collingwood, respectively, before being rerouted.

== Name and vernacular ==
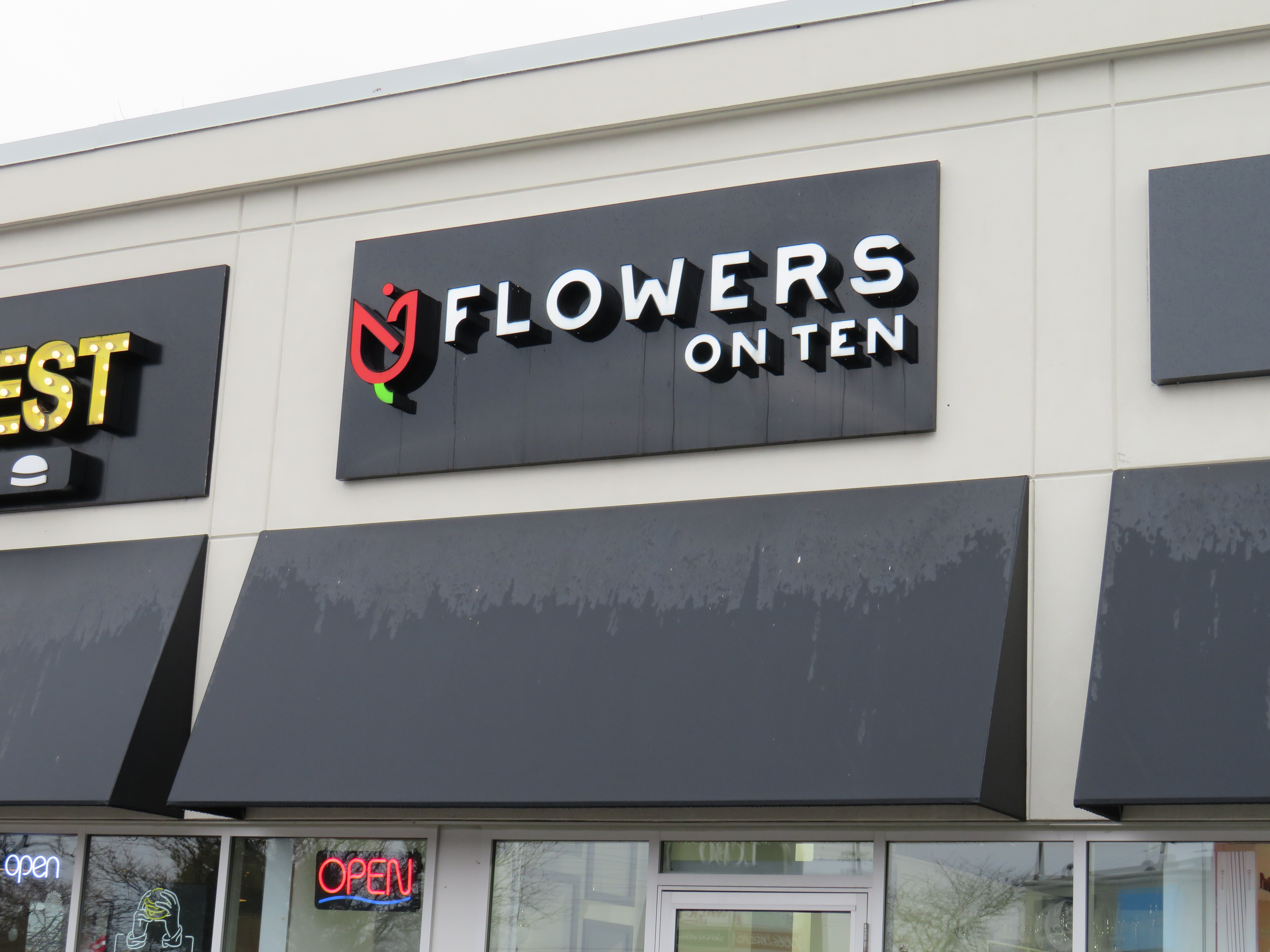
Two examples of continued use of the "Highway 10" vernacular in Mississauga: By a business (top) and at the Hurontario & 407 Park and Ride lot (bottom); the latter being a rare case of present official usage along the street through the city.

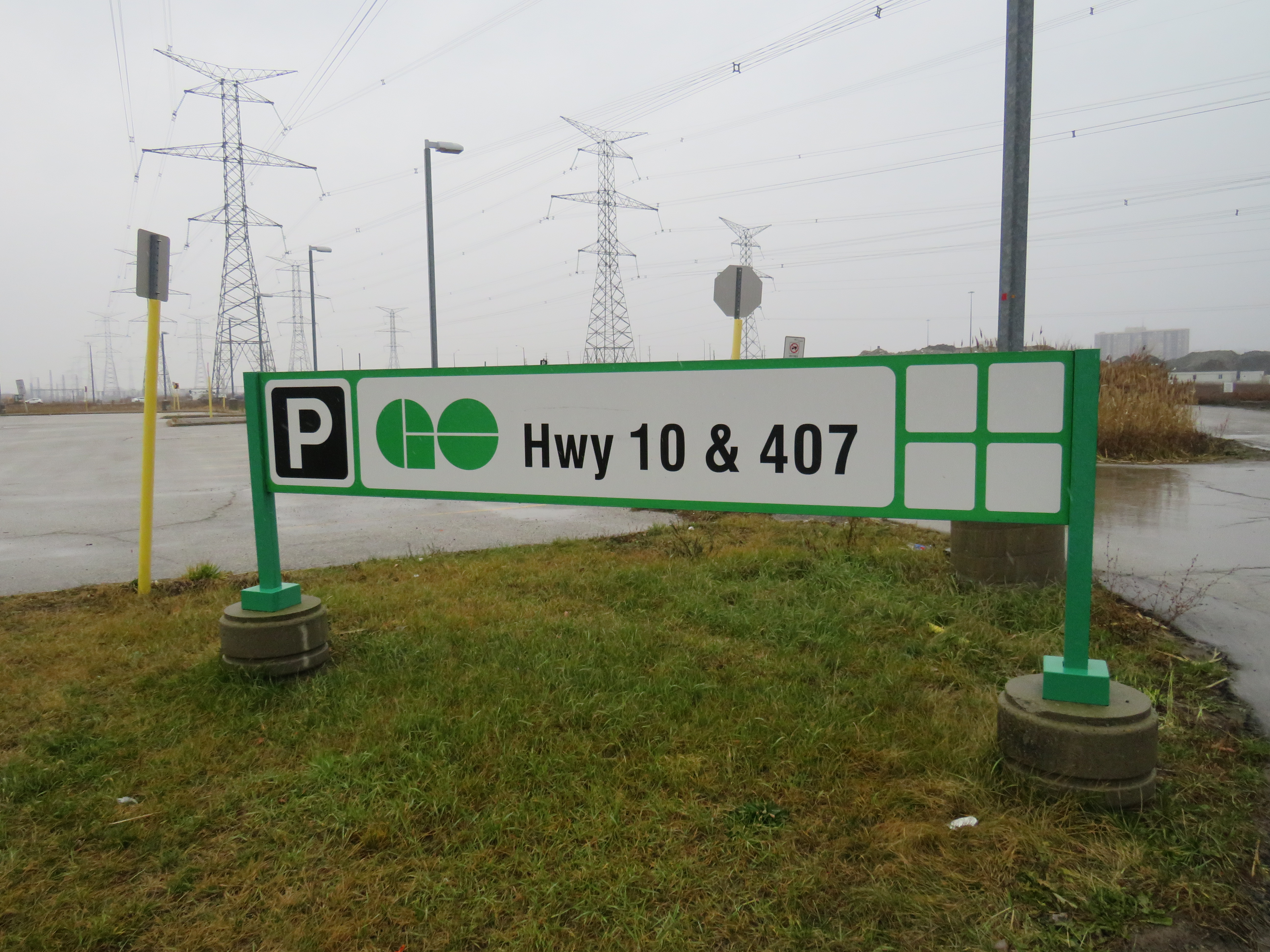

The street's name is a portmanteau of its two terminating Great Lakes: Huron and Ontario. However, most of the street was alternately named Centre Road, due to its role as a divider for much of its length, and still is today in parts. Within the central part of Brampton, the road is named Main Street. In the Townships of Mulmur and Clearview, the road is bypassed and breaks up and has several names; Centre Road, Lavender Hill Road, and Nottawasaga Concession 8. In addition, two parts form short sections of diagonal roads through this area.

In the cities of Mississauga and Brampton (with the exception of the latter's central area), the street is still colloquially referred to by traffic reporters, and even by residents, as "Highway 10" rather than by its street names, despite the high degree of urbanization and the fact that the provincial highway designation is defunct in these cities. A prime example of this is the common reference to the street's intersection with Dundas Street as "Five and Ten", likely because Mississauga is not a traditional city, but was established much later as a reincorporation of the rural Toronto Township, thus the road never had a history of being an urban thoroughfare prior to receiving its highway designation, resulting in continued use of the highway number out of habit. Some businesses use the number in their names, and even the Ministry of Transportation's traffic camera website continues to identify the street as "Hwy 10", as does some signage at the Hurontario & 407 Park and Ride lot and transit terminal. However, the street name predominates in Collingwood.

One result of the use of the terminology is the frequent conflation of Hurontario St. as corresponding to the entire length of Highway 10 to Owen Sound, due to the highway's northern terminus being in that city, which is coincidentally also situated on Lake Huron's Georgian Bay, 62 km. (39 mi.) west of Collingwood (See diagram in 'History' section below for route comparison).

== History ==
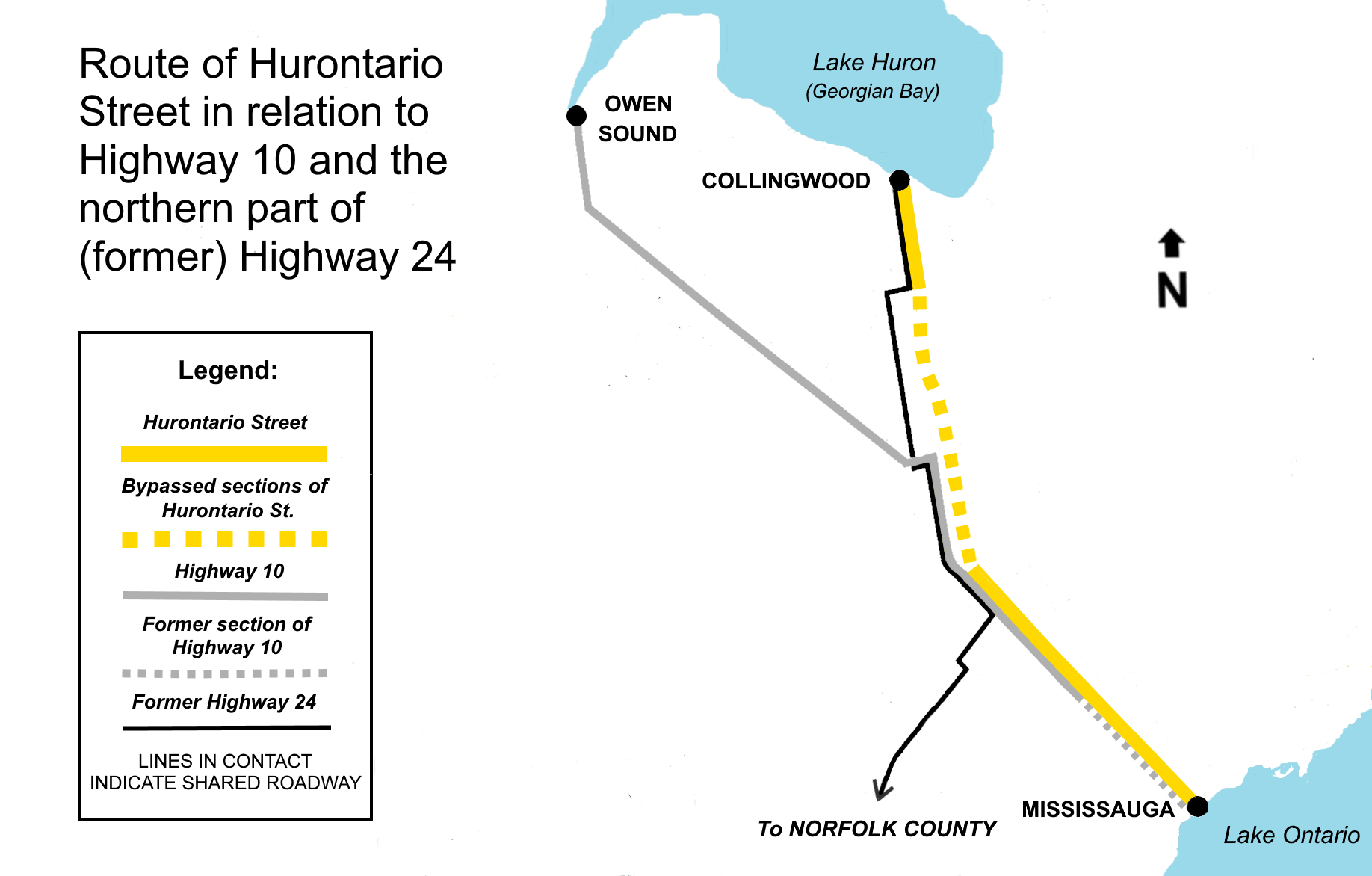
(Click to enlarge) Route of Hurontario St. in relation to Highway 10 and the northern part of former Highway 24

Hurontario Street was created in 1818 by incorporating the combination of the 8th Concession leading south from the harbour on Georgian Bay that later became the site of Collingwood, and the southern part of the Toronto-Sydenham Road, which ran between Toronto Township and Sydenham (present and former Highway 10 between what is today Mississauga and Owen Sound), effectively creating a branched interlake route. As previously mentioned, parts were also alternatively called Centre Road. That name continued to be used interchangeably at least until the 1950s, and a section bypassed by former Highway 24 is still named Centre Road today.

During the construction of the interchange with the Highway 410 extension and Valleywood Boulevard, Hurontario Street was temporarily diverted between August 2007 and November 16, 2009, onto an alternative alignment. After work was complete this road section was bypassed and renamed Hutchinson Farm Lane.

== Route description ==
Mississauga and Brampton

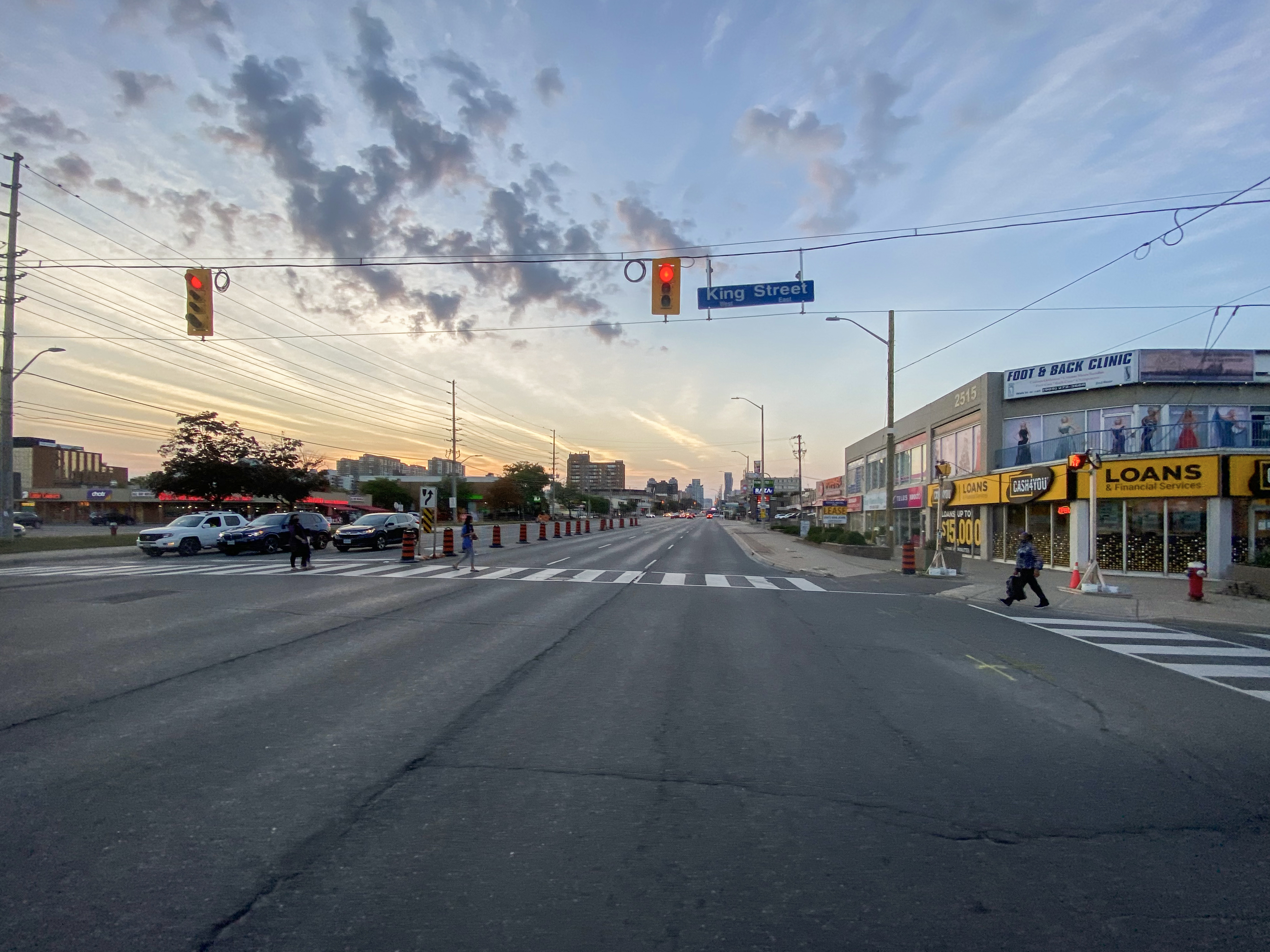
Looking north up Hurontario St. from King St. in Mississauga

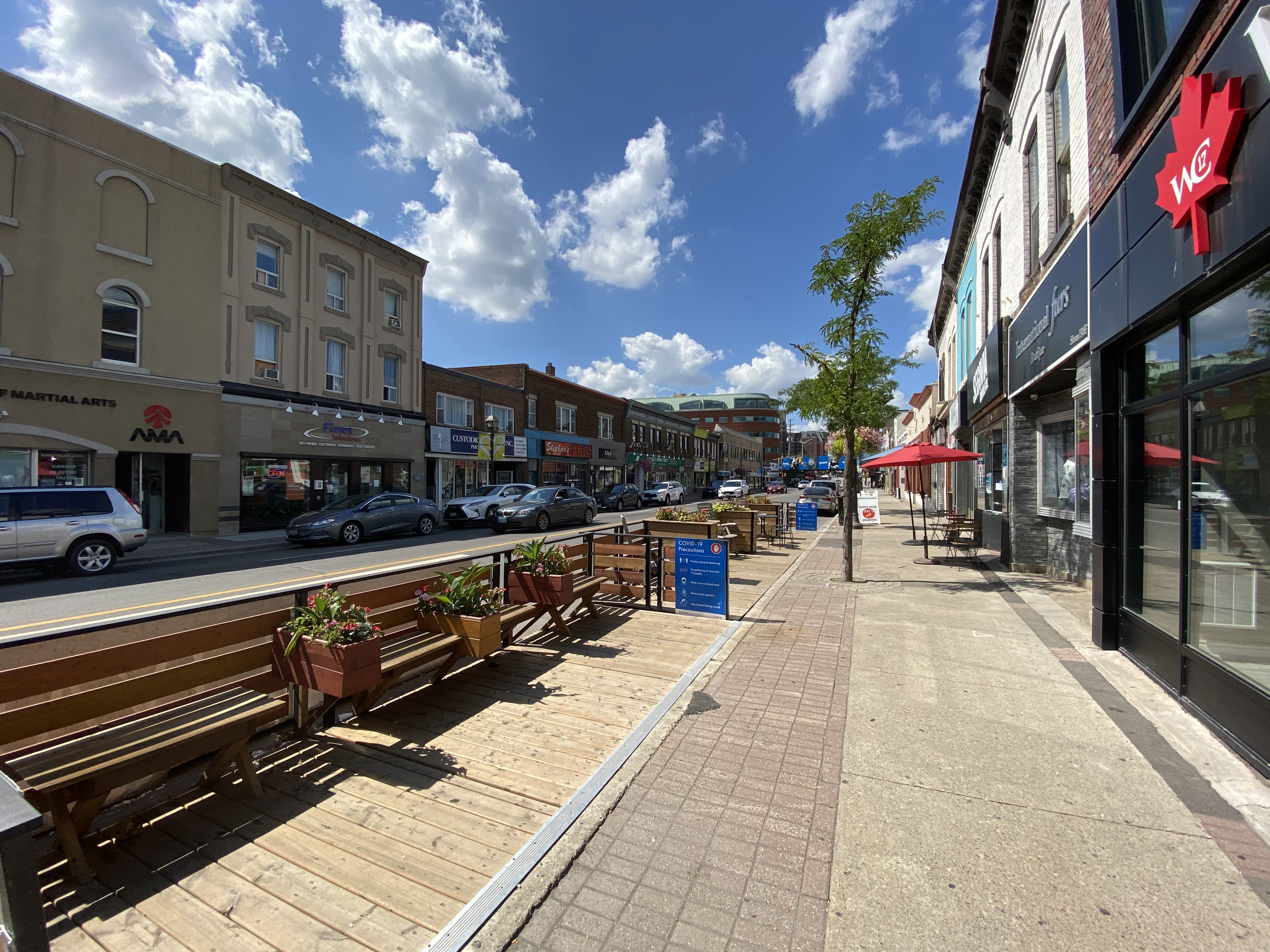
Main St. in downtown Brampton

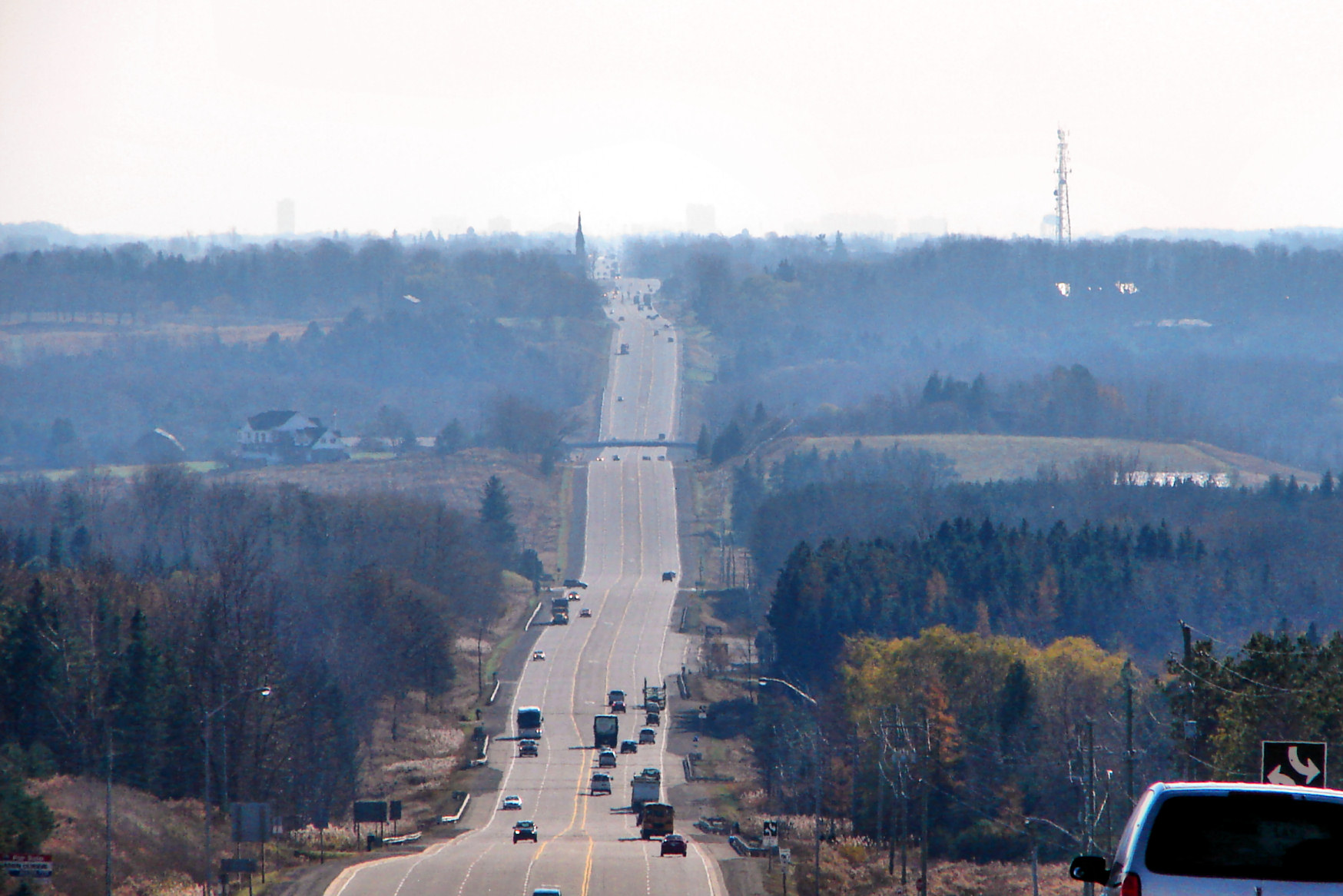
Hurontario as Hwy. 10 through Caledon

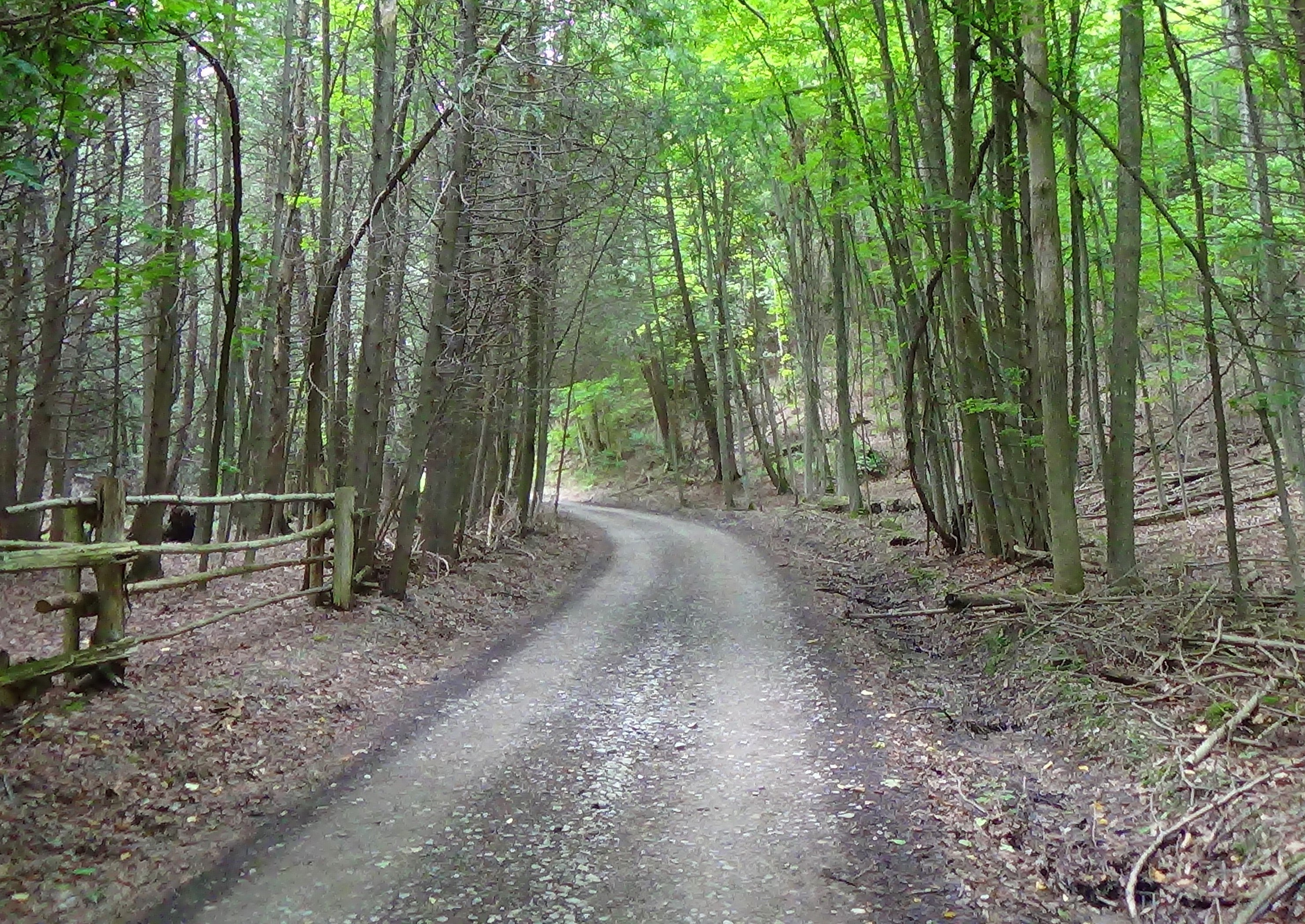
Centre Rd. in Mulmur

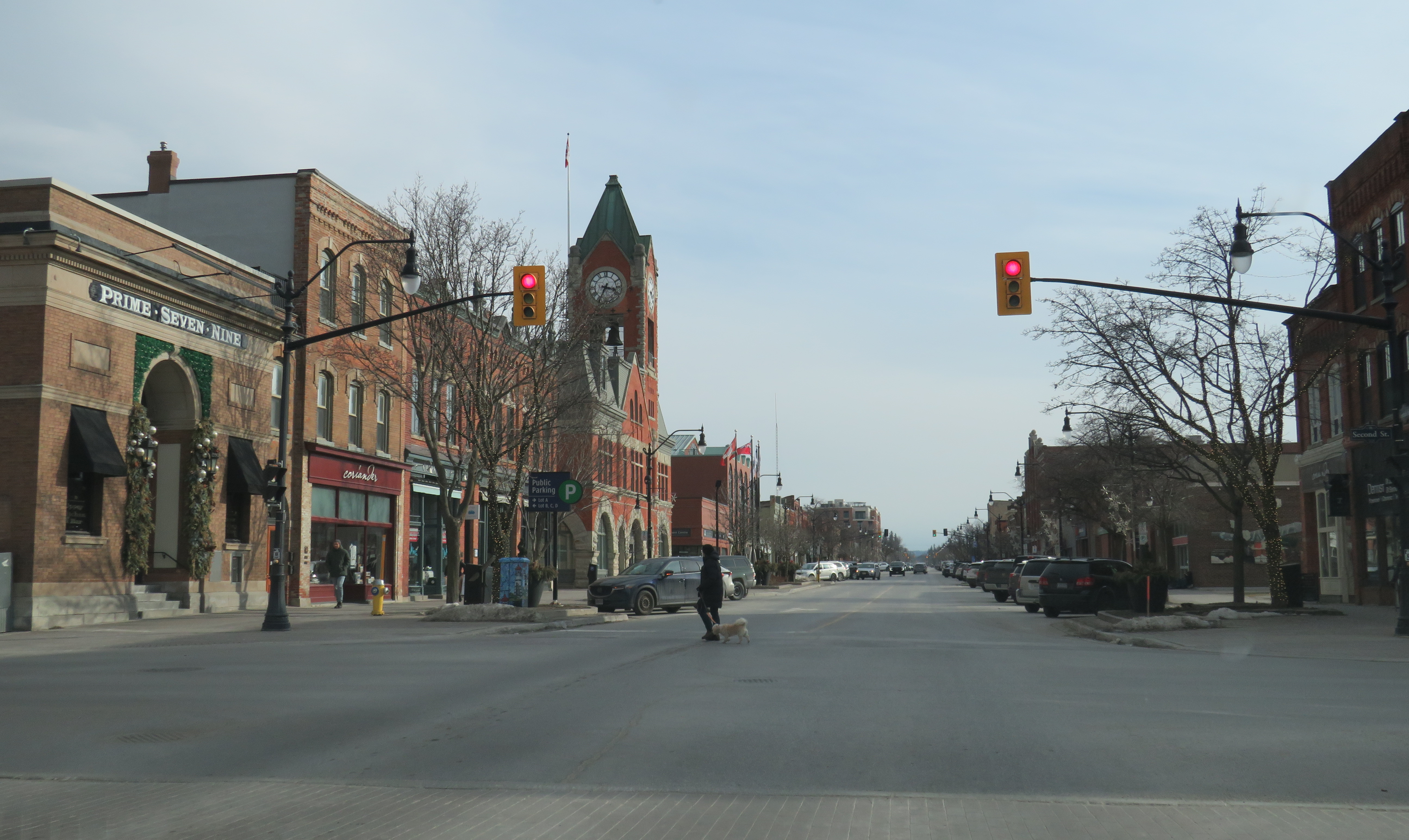
Hurontario St. in downtown Collingwood

The street begins in Mississauga at Lakeshore Road in Port Credit, which forms after the end of St Lawrence Drive, a fairly short street. North of the Canadian National rail underpass, it enters the low-density residential district of Mineola, which extends north to the Queen Elizabeth Way. Then it enters the Cooksville neighbourhood, a higher-density area of highrises and commercial development. At Burnhamthorpe Road, Hurontario passes through Mississauga's City Centre, with the Absolute World condominium towers rising at the northeast corner. After crossing Highway 403, it passes by more high-rise condominiums and suburban mid-density development until it approaches Matheson Boulevard, where a preserved historic farmstead, the Britannia Farm, operated by the Peel District School Board, is located. The road then enters an industrial and commercial area, still under development, which extends beyond Highway 401 all the way to the city limits near Highway 407.

Hurontario then enters Brampton, where it changes name to Main Street after crossing Steeles Avenue. Main St. runs alongside the Etobicoke Creek valley until reaching Brampton's downtown, where it passes landmarks such as Gage Park, Brampton City Hall, and the Rose Theatre Brampton. At Bovaird Drive (formerly Highway 7), the name Hurontario resumes, and the street passes through a lengthy mixed residential/industrial rural-urban fringe zone until it reaches Highway 410 at Brampton's northern city limits.

Caledon to Collingwood

At Highway 410, the Highway 10 designation begins as the street enters rural Caledon, and it has a discontinuity through the interchange as it defaults onto Valleywood Boulevard northbound and the 410 southbound, with ramps connecting the two sections. The road continues northward as the undivided four-lane Highway 10 until reaching Orangeville, where the highway leaves the Hurontario Street alignment to head for the City of Owen Sound, although it parallels it very closely for 21 km. (13 mi.) as it follows First Line WHS. The reason for the highway's chosen alignment was due to a desire to pass through Orangeville's business district farther to the west (before the construction of its present bypass), and in the case of the former Highway 24 segment to the north, difficult terrain through the Niagara Escarpment. In Orangeville, it runs as a residential side street through the town's eastern fringe and breaks at the Orangeville Reservoir. In Mono, it resumes as a minor sideroad to Highway 89, where it breaks again. It picks up again north of Boyne Valley Provincial Park through Mulmur and Clearview townships as a series of broken minor roads with several names (including its historic alternate name; Centre Rd.), running through the hamlets of Dunedin and Glen Huron. North of Glen Huron, it becomes a major road again as it joins Simcoe County Road 124 (which, along with Highway 10, carries the Orangeville-Collingwood through traffic south of this point), until its terminus in Collingwood at Side Launch Way, one block north of First and Huron Streets (Highway 26). The final block is a short one-way northbound extension built in 2009 to serve a residential redevelopment project on the site once occupied by the now-closed Collingwood Shipyards.

== Public transit ==
Hurontario St. is one of the busiest transit corridors in the 905 Region of the Greater Toronto Area. Mississauga and Brampton each run separate systems, but routes cross city boundaries. In addition to local routes operated by both cities, Brampton Transit operates a bus rapid transit line along it, branded as Züm, and Mississauga's MiWay runs a limited-stop express bus route. The MiWay express bus and the southern portion of Zűm are slated to be replaced by a light rail transit line, the Hurontario LRT, along the street in Mississauga and a short distance into Brampton. Construction began in 2020.

In Caledon, GO Transit runs a commuter bus route along the road to Orangeville from Brampton's downtown bus terminal. There is also partial service along the street in Collingwood, provided by Colltrans.

The base trunk routes serving the street are:

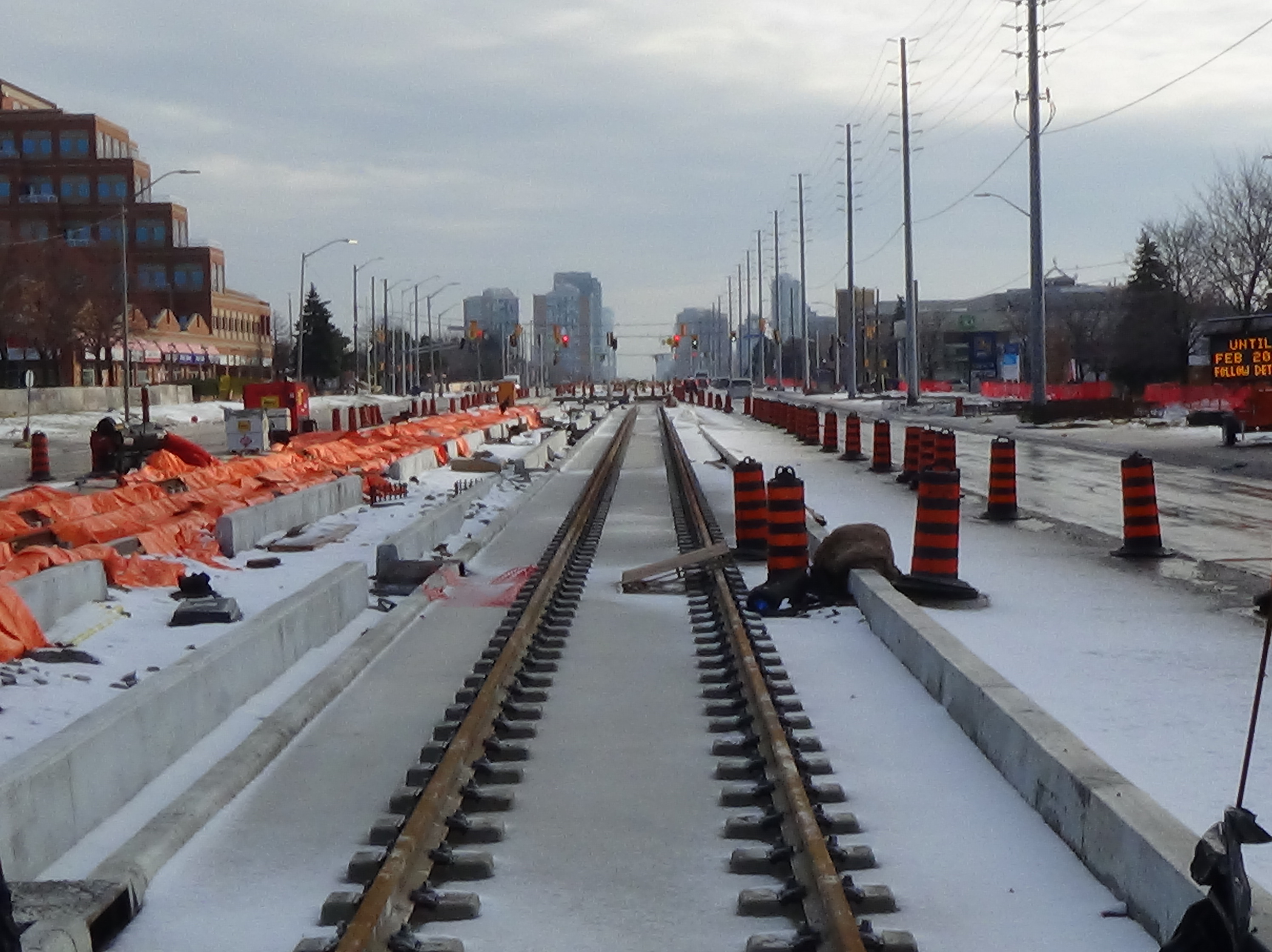
Construction of the Hurontario LRT in December 2022

Mississauga (MiWay):

Route		Direction and Termini			
2	Hurontario (South)	NB	To Mississauga City Centre Transit Terminal	SB	To Port Credit GO station
17	Hurontario (North)	NB	To Hurontario & 407 Park and Ride	SB	To Mississauga City Centre Transit Terminal
103	Hurontario Express	NB	To Brampton Gateway Terminal (Steeles Avenue)	SB	To Mississauga Hospital; Bypasses City Centre Transit Terminal

Brampton (Brampton Transit):

Route		Direction and Termini			
2	Main	NB	To Heart Lake Town Centre via Sandalwood Parkway	SB	To Maritz Drive (Derry Road) via Highway 407 Park and Ride
502	Züm Main	NB	To Sandalwood Parkway	SB	To Mississauga City Centre Transit Terminal; Bypasses Highway 407 Park and Ride and Downtown Brampton Terminal

Caledon (GO Transit)

Route		Direction and Termini			
37	Orangeville/Brampton	NB	To Orangeville GO Park and Ride	SB	To Brampton Downtown Terminal; Some trips detour to Bramalea GO

Collingwood (Colltrans)

The East Route operates along Hurontario for part of its run.

== Landmarks ==
Landmarks and notable sites along Hurontario from south to north

Landmark	Cross street/location	Notes	Image
Port Credit	Lakeshore Road	Historic neighbourhood at Mississauga's central waterfront	
Absolute World condominiums	Burnhamthorpe Road	Nicknamed the Marilyn Monroe Towers	
Britannia Farm	Bristol Road	Preserved agricultural lands used as an educational facility. Owned by the Peel District School Board	
Peel District School Board Headquarters	Matheson Boulevard		
Dufferin-Peel Catholic District School Board Headquarters	Matheson Boulevard		
A. Grenville and William Davis Courthouse	County Court Boulevard	Expansion of existing courthouse complex. Opened in 2000	
Shoppers World Brampton	Steeles Avenue	Street changes name to Main Street though central Brampton	
Gage Park	Wellington Street		
Peel Art Gallery, Museum and Archives	Wellington Street	Former Peel County Courthouse	
Brampton City Hall	Wellington Street		
The Rose	Queen Street		
Orangeville Reservoir	Orangeville	Artificial lake within Island Lake Conservation Area	
Glen Huron	Nottawasaga 15/16 Sideroad	Community within Clearview Township	
Nottawa	South of Poplar Sideroad	Community within Clearview Township	
Collingwood Town Hall	Simcoe Street		
