= Ontario Highway 27 =

Ontario provincial highway

Highway 27
- York Regional Road 27; Simcoe County Road 27
- Highway 27 highlighted in red

Route information
- Maintained by Ministry of Transportation of Ontario, City of Toronto, the Regional Municipality of York and the County of Simcoe
- Length: 1.6 km (0.99 mi)
- Existed: September 14, 1927–present

Major junctions
- South end: Highway 427 – Toronto
- Eglinton Avenue
- North end: End of divided highway north of Mimico Creek culvert

Location
- Country: Canada
- Province: Ontario

Highway system
- Ontario provincial highways; Current; Former; 400-series
← Highway 26	→ Highway 28

King's Highway 27, commonly referred to as Highway 27, is a provincially maintained highway in the Canadian province of Ontario. The Ministry of Transportation of Ontario was once responsible for the length of the route, when it ran from Long Branch to Highway 93 in Waverley. Highway 27 followed a mostly straight route throughout its length, as it passed through the suburbs of Toronto, then north of Kleinburg the vast majority of the highway was surrounded by rural farmland. Today, only the southernmost one mile (1.6 km) from Highway 427 north to Mimico Creek is under provincial jurisdiction, the remainder of the route is maintained by the city of Toronto, York Region and Simcoe County.

Highway 27 was created in 1927, connecting Barrie with Penetanguishene. It was extended south to Schomberg in 1934, and later to Toronto by the late 1930s. Between Barrie and Toronto, the route served as a redundancy to Highway 11 (Yonge Street), and later Highway 400. Through the 1950s, the portion of Highway 27 between Evans Avenue and north of Eglinton Avenue was expanded into a four-laned dual highway known as the Toronto Bypass (which included portions of the new Highway 401 through Toronto). Beginning in the mid-1960s, this dual highway was expanded into the current collector–express system and renumbered as Highway 427 upon completion at the end of 1971. The majority of the remainder of the route was decommissioned in the late 1990s; the majority of the former highway is now designated and signed as York Regional Road 27 and Simcoe County Road 27. Within the City of Toronto, it retains "Highway 27" as a name along the decommissioned section, but has no route shields, as Toronto does not have a numbered road system.

== Route description ==
The southern terminus of Highway 27, where it transitions into the collector lanes of Highway 427 south of Eglinton Avenue

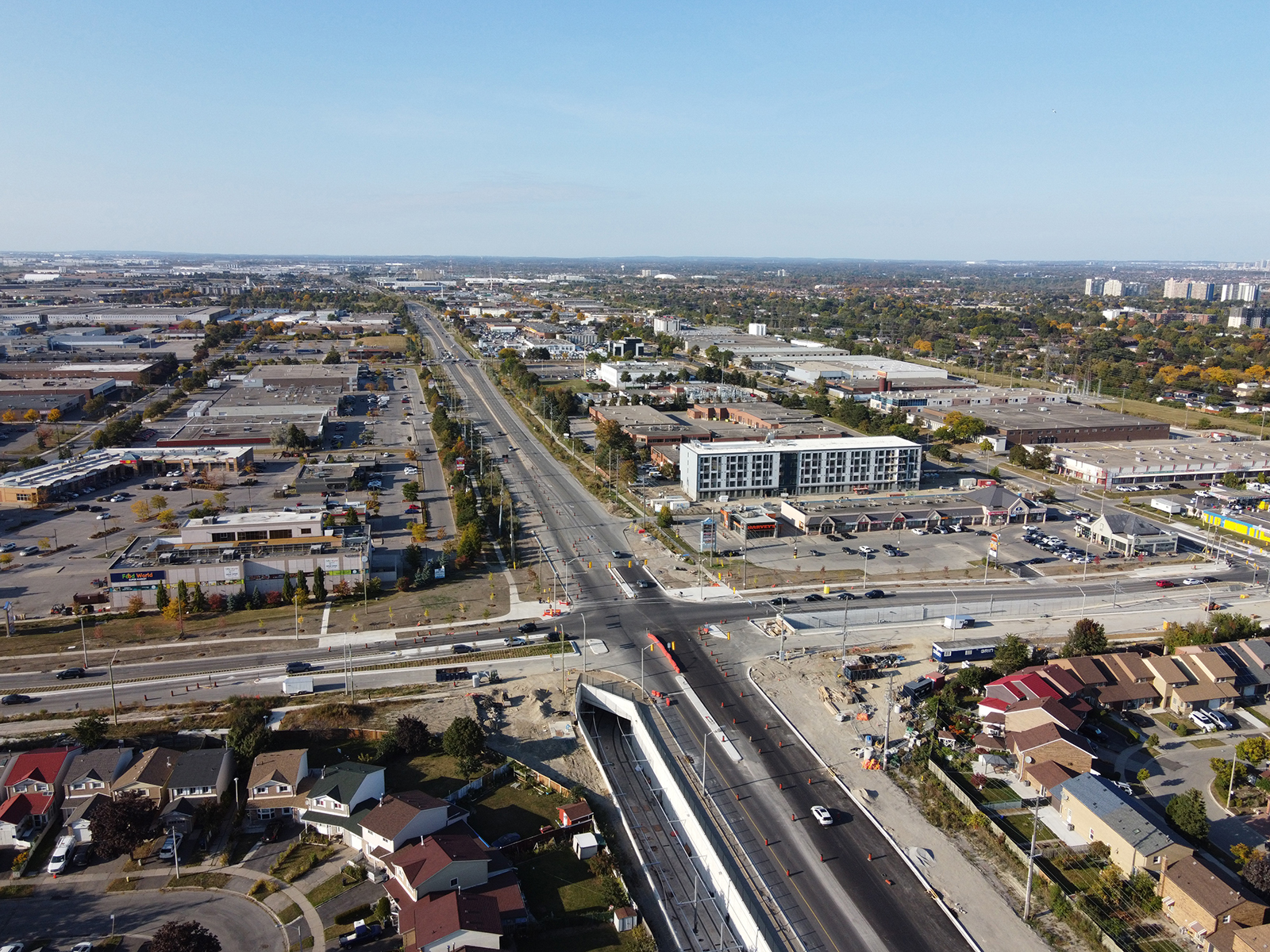
"Former" Highway 27 at Finch Avenue

As of 2021, Highway 27 begins to the south at the offramps from the collector lanes of Highway 427 as a four-lane, divided highway. While the express lanes, constituting the mainline Highway 427, curve around the Richview Memorial Cemetery and shift west by approximately 1 kilometre (0.62 miles), the collector lanes transitioning to Highway 27 continue northward and cross Eglinton Avenue at a half-cloverleaf interchange (originally meant for the never-built Richview Expressway) before diving under Highway 401. While there are no longer any visible route markers for Highway 27 along this stretch, the northbound on-ramp from westbound Eglinton Avenue still has signage displaying the highway number within the outline of the crown, signifying that this section of the highway is still provincially owned. Highway 27 ends north of Mimico creek at the end of the divided highway, transitioning into an undivided highway with a rural cross-section with a wide right-of-way (rather than a typical suburban arterial street) of the same name.

=== Former route (1997) ===
Through Etobicoke, it encountered mostly industrial surroundings, meeting Dixon Road at a cloverleaf interchange near the Toronto Congress Centre, then crossing (but not interchanging with) Highway 409. Highway 27 followed a mostly straight route throughout its length, as it passed through the suburb of Rexdale, then north of Kleinburg, with the vast majority of the highway being surrounded by rural farmland. Within Etobicoke, Highway 27 travelled along the 3rd Concession, and in York Region followed the 9th Concession of Vaughan and King Township; both being approximately 16 kilometres west of Yonge Street. It passed along the western edge of suburban sprawl in Vaughan, near the community of Woodbridge. South of Kleinburg, the highway dipped into the Humber River valley, connecting with Islington Avenue. North of the valley, it continued through King Township into the Oak Ridges Moraine, dividing the village of Nobleton and entering Schomberg immediately south of Highway 9, north of which the highway entered Simcoe County.

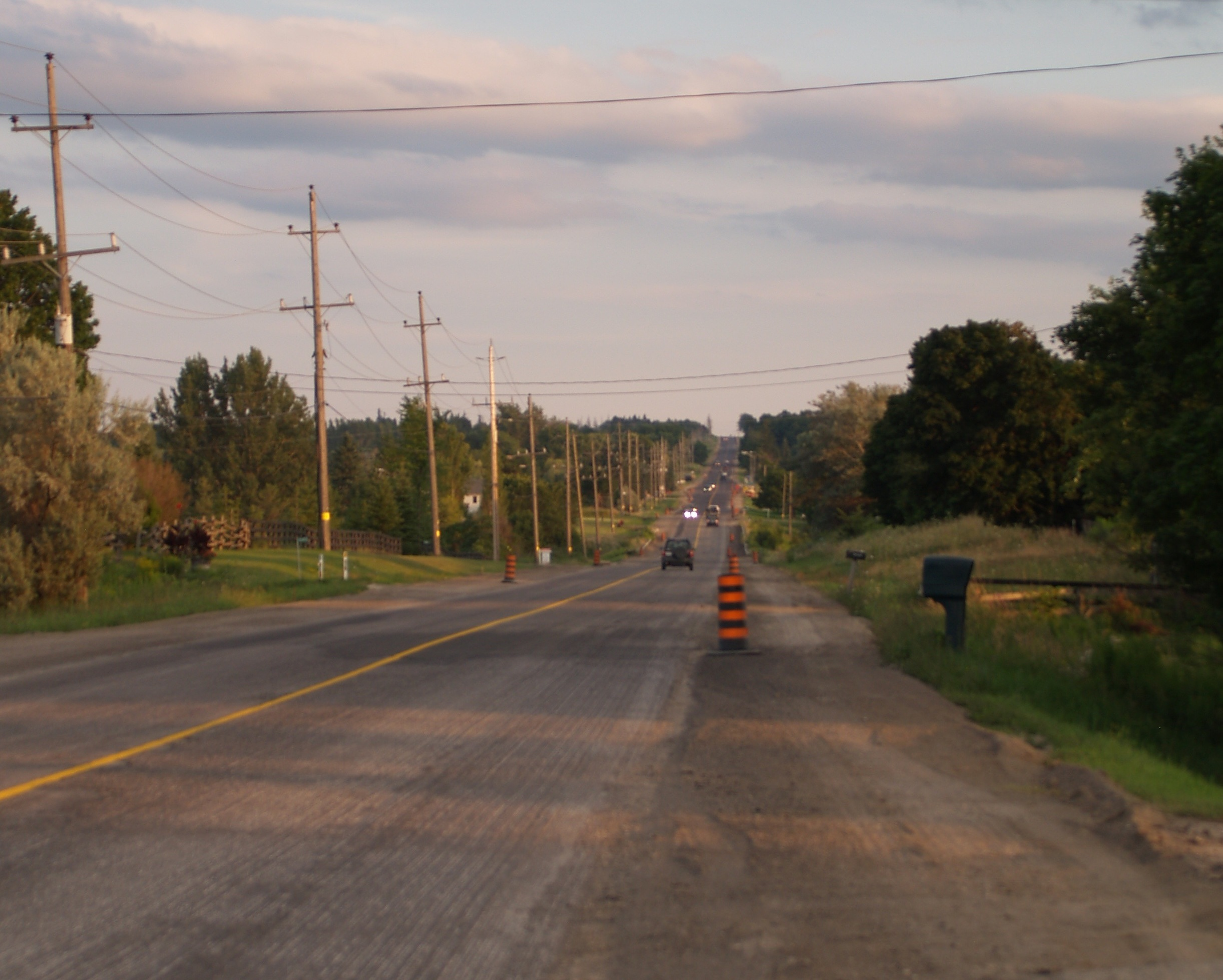
Former Highway 27 south of Schomberg

North of Highway 9, the route curved 1.5 kilometres (0.93 miles) to the east, then continued north, parallel to Highway 400. It followed the townline between Tecumseth and West Gwillimbury townships. It travelled through the village of Bond Head and thereafter met Highway 89 in Cookstown. As the highway approached Barrie, it curved and followed Essa Road northeast until it met Highway 400. Through Barrie, it was concurrent with Highway 400 between Exit 94 and Exit 98, after which it was concurrent with Highway 26 along Bayfield Street, travelling north and exiting the city. At Midhurst, Highway 27 diverged from its concurrency to continue north, parallel to and four kilometres (2.5 mi) west of Highway 400. After passing through the village of Elmvale and the end of Highway 92, the highway abruptly turned to the east to a junction with Highway 93 in the community of Waverley, which assumed the section north of here in the 1980s. Continuing north again, the highway meandered towards Georgian Bay, departing from the old Penetanguishene Road at Mertz's Corner. The route curved around the western side of a large marsh before entering the community of Wyebridge, where it crossed the Wye River. Several kilometres north of Wyebridge, Highway 27 met Highway 12 on the outskirts of Midland. It then rejoined Penetanguishene Road and continued north into Penetanguishene, ending at Robert Street near Penetanguishene Harbour.

== History ==
The original alignment of Highway 27 required drivers to travel along Highway 9 briefly. The current Leonard Road was formerly Highway 27 connecting from Highway 9 to 27 north of 2 Line.

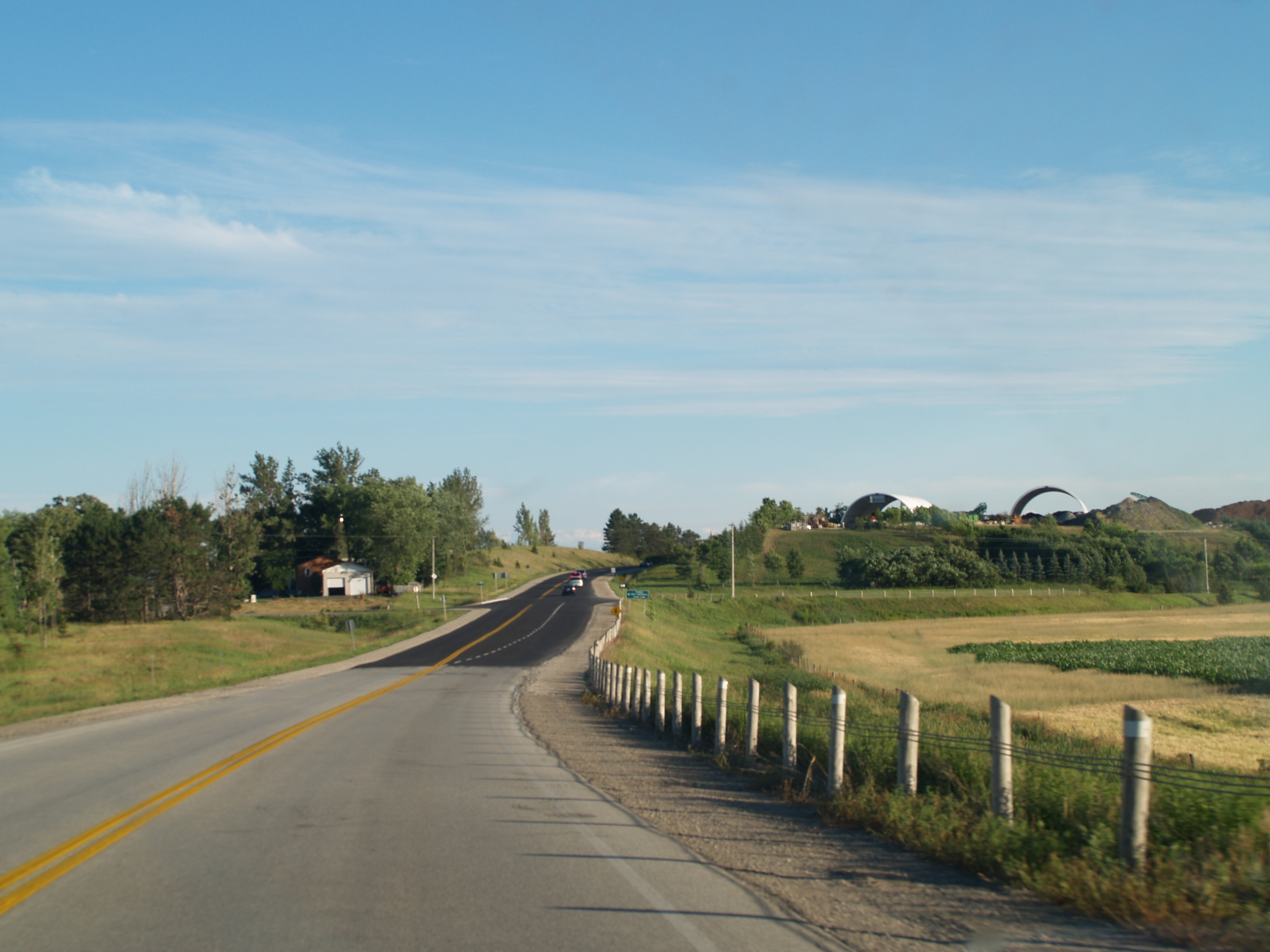
The alignment (Schomberg Bypass) completed in 1968 provided a direct route between the two discontinuous sections of Highway 27.

Highway 27 was first designated between Barrie and Penetanguishene on September 14, 1927. On March 28, 1934 it was extended south to Schomberg via county roads south of Barrie. On August 12, 1936, Browns Line and Eaton Road were designated as part of Highway 27, creating an isolated section of the route between Long Branch and Elder Mills (at the modern intersection of Rutherford Road). On the same date, the road between Schomberg and Kleinburg was designated as part of Highway 27, leaving a gap between Elder Mills and Kleinburg, through the Humber valley. This gap was closed beginning in late 1936. It was completed and opened to traffic in 1938, bringing Highway 27 to its peak length of 148.1 km (92.0 mi).

In the mid-1950s, the Toronto Bypass was constructed between Highway 2A and the Queen Elizabeth Way (QEW), widening Highway 27 to a four lane freeway in the process. This section was reconstructed again starting in 1968 and continuing until the early 1970s to turn it into a twelve-lane collector-express system. The junction with the QEW was built over 48.5 ha (120 acres) and required the construction of 19 bridges and the equivalent of 42 km (26 mi) of two lane roadway. The junction with Highway 401 sprawls over 156 ha (385 acres) and required the construction of 28 bridges and the equivalent of 46.6 km (29 mi) of two lane roadway, the largest interchange in Canada. The former was opened to traffic on November 14, 1969, while the latter required several more years of construction staging, fully opening on December 4, 1971 (though portions were opened in the weeks prior to that), just prior to the renumbering of Highway 27 as Highway 427. The rest of the route was rebuilt prior to the completion of these interchanges. In the new configuration, with Highway 27 being the continuation of Highway 427 collector lanes as they split off from the express lanes approaching Highway 401, Highway 27 received a half-cloverleaf interchange with Eglinton Avenue (originally meant for the never-built Richview Expressway), however Highway 27 lost its direct access to Highway 401 (although indirect access is available via Dixon Road). The isolated section of Highway 27 following Browns Line from south of the QEW to Lake Shore Boulevard (then Highway 2) was subsequently decommissioned.

On June 21, 1968, a new bypass north of Schomberg opened. Originally, northbound traffic had to turn east at Highway 9 then north at Leonard Road; a smooth curve is visible at this latter intersection, though it now forms the driveways of several residences. The new bypass made Highway 27 a through route at Highway 9. In 1982, the section between Waverley and Penetanguishene was renumbered as an extension of Highway 93. The remainder of the route, from Eglinton Avenue north to Waverley, was decommissioned on January 1, 1998. Within the City of Toronto it is locally maintained, and still known as Highway 27; a proposal to rename it to "Etobicoke Drive" was rejected. North of Toronto, it is known as York Regional Road 27 and Simcoe County Road 27, depending on the jurisdiction.

== Major intersections ==
The following table lists the major junctions along Highway 27, as noted by the Ministry of Transportation of Ontario. Former sections of Highway 27 are based upon lengths from the 1989 distance tables.

Division	Location	km	mi	Destinations	Notes
Toronto		0.0	0.0	Highway 427 south	Northbound exit and southbound entrance; southern end of provincially maintained section
Toronto		0.6	0.37	Eglinton Avenue	Grade-separated interchange; no southbound to westbound exit
Toronto		0.9	0.56	Highway 401	No direct access from Highway 27; accessible via Dixon Road
Toronto		1.6	0.99	Highway 27 ends	Northern end of provincially maintained section; divided highway ends
Toronto		2.9	1.8	Dixon Road	Grade-separated interchange
Toronto		6.1	3.8	Rexdale Boulevard	
Toronto		9.3	5.8	Albion Road	Formerly Highway 50
Toronto–York boundary	Toronto–Vaughan boundary	10.6	6.6	York Regional Road 27 begins Steeles Avenue	
York	Vaughan	11.0	6.8	407 ETR	Highway 407 exit 59
York	Vaughan	12.7	7.9	Regional Road 7 (Highway 7)	Formerly Highway 7; Highway 7 was decommissioned through York Region on the same day as Highway 27
York	Vaughan	20.7	12.9	Regional Road 49 west (Nashville Road)	Formerly Highway 49 west
York	Vaughan	21.2	13.2	Islington Avenue	
York	King	27.5	17.1	Regional Road 11 (King Road)	Nobleton
York	King	33.8	21.0	Sideroad 17	Formerly Regional Road 15
York	King	37.8	23.5	Regional Road 16 east (Lloydtown Road) – Lloydtown, Pottageville	
York–Simcoe boundary	King–New Tecumseth boundary	39.9	24.8	Highway 9 – Orangeville, Newmarket York Regional Road 27 ends Simcoe County Road 27 begins	Schomberg
Simcoe	Bradford West Gwillimbury	49.4	30.7	County Road 88 east – Bradford	Bond Head; formerly Highway 88 east
Simcoe	Bradford West Gwillimbury	50.8	31.6	County Road 1 west (8th Line) – Beeton	
Simcoe	Innisfil	60.9	37.8	Highway 89 (Queen Street) – Alliston, Shelburne	Cookstown
Simcoe	Essa	69.7	43.3	County Road 21 west (Robert Street)	Thornton
Simcoe	Essa	70.2	43.6	County Road 21 east (Innisfil Beach Road)	
Barrie		73.1	45.4	County Road 27 north	Formerly Highway 131 north; previous Highway 27 alignment; former Highway 27 follows Essa Road
Barrie		80.0	49.7	Highway 400	Highway 400 exit 94
Barrie		80.9	50.3	Burton Avenue	Formerly Highway 11 south; former southern end of Highway 11 concurrency
Barrie		82.9	51.5	Dunlop Street West	Formerly Highway 90 west; former Highway 11 / Highway 27 follows Dunlop Street
Barrie		83.2	51.7	Dunlop Street East / Bayfield Street	Former Highway 26 southern terminus; formerly Highway 11 north; former northern end of Highway 11 concurrency; former southern end of Highway 26 concurrency; former Highway 26 / Highway 27 follows Bayfield Street
Barrie		84.5	52.5	Highway 26 begins Highway 400	Highway 400 exit 98; present-day Highway 26 eastern terminus
Simcoe	Springwater (Midhurst)	89.6	55.7	County Road 43 west (Snow Valley Road)	
Simcoe	Springwater (Midhurst)	90.4	56.2	Highway 26 west – Collingwood, Owen Sound County Road 27 resumes	Former southern end of Highway 26 concurrency; former Highway 27 continues along Simcoe County Road 27
Simcoe	Springwater	98.1	61.0	County Road 22 (Horseshoe Valley Road) – Horseshoe Valley	
Simcoe	Elmvale	109.2	67.9	County Road 92 west (Queen Street) – Wasaga Beach; County Road 19 east (South Orr Lake Road)	Formerly Highway 92 west
Simcoe	Saurin	111.0	69.0	County Road 6 north	
Simcoe	Tay	119.4	74.2	Highway 93 (Penetanguishene Road) – Barrie, Crown Hill	Waverley; 1982-1997 Highway 27 northern terminus; former Highway 27 previously followed present-day Highway 93 north
Simcoe	Midland	130.6	81.2	Highway 12 south – Orillia, Coldwater Highway 93 ends County Road 93 begins	Present-day northern terminus of Highway 93 and Highway 12
Simcoe	Penetanguishene	138.1	85.8	Robert Street County Road 93 ends	Pre-1982 Highway 27 northern terminus
1.000 mi = 1.609 km; 1.000 km = 0.621 mi: Closed/former; Incomplete access

== Former exits ==
There were some exits to the highway that were removed after the southern portion of the highway from Highway 401 to the QEW was rebranded as Highway 427. This includes:

-Courtwright Drive; southbound entrance only.

-Wellesworth Drive; southbound entrance and exit.

-West Deane Valley Drive; northbound entrance and exit.

== See also ==
- Cancelled expressways in Toronto
