= Midhurst, Ontario =

Midhurst
- Unincorporated community
- Location within Ontario
- Coordinates: 44°26′36″N 79°43′18″W
- Country: Canada
- Province: Ontario
- County: Simcoe County

Population (2011)
  - Total: 3,000
- Time zone: UTC-5 (Eastern (EST))
  - Summer (DST): UTC-4 (EDT)
- Area code: 705
- Website: midhurstontario.com

Midhurst is a community in the Township of Springwater, Simcoe County, Ontario, Canada. It is the county seat, and with nearly 3,000 people, the largest population centre in Springwater.

It is the location of the Barrie Baycats of the Intercounty Baseball League. Midhurst has a public elementary school, Forest Hill Public School, which is a part of the Simcoe County District School Board.

== History ==
Midhurst was named after the town of Midhurst, in the United Kingdom. Cowdray Park is also named after the main park in that town. A tree nursery and a saw mill on Willow Creek existed in Midhurst that supplied trees for the province. 'Finlay Mill Road' is so named, as Alex Finlay was its owner. The Midhurst Pioneer Cemetery, no longer in operation, exists near the United Church, along with the non-denominational Midhurst Union Cemetery. Willow Creek featured a grist-mill and hydro power house that supplied electricity to Barrie from 1826 to 1888. The old grist-mill stone stands as a monument near the Finlay Mill bridge.

== Arts and culture ==
Midhurst Autumnfest, an annual fall fair, has run from 1969 to the present.

== Attractions ==
- Green Pine Park and Doran Park are the two public parks in Midhurst, connected by Willow Creek.
- Barrie Community Sports Complex opened in 2000.
- Willow Creek runs through Midhurst and much of the surrounding marshland, alongside Hunter-Russel Trail.
- The Springwater Public Library is located in Midhurst.

== Infrastructure ==
=== Transportation ===
Midhurst is located at the junction of Ontario Highway 26 and Ontario Highway 27.

The community has two Simcoe County LINX stops on its Line 1 Penetanguishene/Midland–Barrie bus route, which connects Midhurst to locations along the roughly north-south route.

== Notable people ==
- Robert Dick Orok (1958) served in the Legislative Assembly of Manitoba from 1912 to 1915, as a member of the Conservative Party.
- Matthew Beleskey (1988) former NHL left winger
- Alexandra Paul (1991) is an Olympic ice dancer. She won silver at the 2010 World Junior Figure Skating Championships, and bronze at the Canadian Figure Skating Championships, with partner Mitchell Islam.
- Mitchell Hooper is a professional strongman competitor and holder of the 2023 World's Strongest Man title.
