= Ontario Highway 92 =

Former Ontario provincial highway

King's Highway 92

Route information
- Maintained by the Ministry of Transportation
- Length: 23.9 km (14.9 mi)
- Existed: August 5, 1936–January 1, 1998

Major junctions
- West end: Highway 26 in Wasaga Beach
- East end: Highway 27 in Elmvale

Location
- Country: Canada
- Province: Ontario
- Towns: Wasaga Beach, Elmvale

Highway system
- Ontario provincial highways; Current; Former; 400-series
← Highway 91	→ Highway 93

King's Highway 92, also known as Highway 92, was a provincially maintained highway in the Canadian province of Ontario. The route connected Highway 26 west of Wasaga Beach with Highway 27 in Elmvale. Highway 92 was established in 1936, although it did not extend through Wasaga Beach to Highway 26 until the early 1980s. The entire route was downloaded in 1997 and transferred to Simcoe County. Today, the section of the former highway outside Wasaga Beach is known as Simcoe County Road 92.

== Route description ==
When it was downloaded at the beginning of 1998, Highway 92 connected Highway 26 near Collingwood with former Highway 27 in Elmvale. Through Wasaga Beach, the highway travelled to Ansley Road before turning onto River Road West and exited the town heading east. The highway was surrounded by residences and a few commercial establishments throughout this distance. Between Sunnidale Road and Blueberry Trail, the route travelled parallel to the Nottawasaga River, which drains into nearby Nottawasaga Bay to the north.

East of Blueberry Trail, the route curved eastwards and progressed out of the town and into farmland. The route was straight for the remainder of its length, intersection County Road 29 (Crossland Road) midway between Wasaga Beach and Elmvale. Entering Elmvale, the route crossed a former railway and became surrounded by residences. It ended at Highway 27 (Yonge Street) in the centre of the village.

Today, the western end of the former highway is no longer part of Highway 26, as that route was realigned in 2012 to bypass the exurban stretch between Wasaga Beach and Collingwood; the former routing is now known as Beachwood Road. Mosley Street was extended to meet the new bypass, and a roundabout was built there as well as at the intersection with Beachwood Road.

== History ==
Highway 92 was first established by the Department of Highways in 1936 to connect Highway 27 at Elmvale with Wasaga Beach. On August 5, 1936, 8.87-mile (14.27 km) of local roadway was assumed from Flos Township into the expanding provincial highway network. Originally, the unpaved highway ended at the intersection of Main Street and River Road East, and did not connect with Highway 26 to the west. Aside from paving, which was completed by 1949, the route remained unchanged until the early 1980s. In 1980 or 1981, Highway 92 was extended through Wasaga Beach to Highway 26 via River Road West and Mosley Street after the Schoonertown Bridge over the Nottawasaga River was completed.

Highway 27 was transferred to Simcoe County on April 1, 1997, temporarily resulting in Highway 92 ending at a county road. On January 1, 1998, the entire highway was transferred to Simcoe County, decommissioning the route in the process. Simcoe County subsequently transferred the section through Wasaga Beach to that town, but maintains the remainder of the former highway as Simcoe County Road 92.

== Major intersections ==
The following table lists the major junctions along Highway 92, as noted by the Ministry of Transportation of Ontario. The entire route is located in Simcoe County.

Location	km	mi	Destinations	Notes
Wasaga Beach	0.0	0.0	Highway 26 – Collingwood, Barrie	Presently Beachwood Road / Lyons Court. Since 2012, Highway 26 has been bypassed to the west and is now accessed by an extension of Mosely Street.
Wasaga Beach	2.6	1.6	45th Street	
Wasaga Beach	4.2	2.6	Sunnidale Road	
Wasaga Beach	10.8	6.7	Main Street	
Wasaga Beach	13.6	8.5		Eastern town limits
Springwater	17.6	10.9	County Road 29 (Crossland Road)	
Elmvale	22.9	14.2		Western limits
Elmvale	23.9	14.9	Highway 27 – Barrie	
1.000 mi = 1.609 km; 1.000 km = 0.621 mi: Closed/former
