= Ontario Highway 88 =

Former Ontario provincial highway

Highway 88
- Highway 88 (highlighted in red)

Route information
- Maintained by The Ministry of Transportation of Ontario
- Length: 9.7 km (6.0 mi)
- Existed: 1938–1998

Major junctions
- West end: Highway 27 (now Simcoe County Road 27) in Bond Head
- East end: Highway 11 (now Simcoe County Road 4) in Bradford

Location
- Country: Canada
- Province: Ontario
- Counties: Simcoe County
- Towns: Bond Head, Bradford

Highway system
- Ontario provincial highways; Current; Former; 400-series
← Highway 87	→ Highway 89

King's Highway 88, commonly referred to as Highway 88, was a provincially maintained highway in the Canadian province of Ontario, located in what is now the town of Bradford West Gwillimbury, that connected former Highway 27, in the village of Bond Head, with former Highway 11 in the town of Bradford. The short 9.7-kilometre (6.0 mi) route was established in 1938, though the road it followed had existed for over a century at that time.

A toll road was created between Bond Head and Holland Landing in 1836, known as the West Gwillimbury Road. Through the 1850s it was planked, and served as a major route for wheat and other agricultural goods headed for Toronto markets. The upkeep undid the profits, and the planks were removed by the end of the decade, reverting the road to dirt. Nonetheless, it was the first road in Simcoe County with a "paved" surface.

As a provincial highway it remained generally unchanged except for the construction of Highway 400 that resulted in the construction of an interchange with the route in the early 1950s, and the paving of the gravel highway in 1956. The route was decommissioned in 1998 and transferred to Simcoe County. Since then it has been known as Simcoe County Road 88.

== Route description ==
Highway 88 facing west, near Highway 400

Highway 88 began at an intersection with what was then Highway 27, but is now known as Simcoe County Road 27, in the community of Bond Head. It proceeded eastward into farmland, where it intersected 5th Sideroad just prior to encountering an interchange with Highway 400 at Exit 64. At the northwest corner of the interchange was Yogi Bear's Jellystone Park and Camp Resort. East of Highway 400, the highway continued through farmland, intersecting 10th Sideroad; the ghost community of Middleton (sometimes spelt Middletown) formerly existed at this crossroad. It entered the urban area of Bradford at what is now Professor Day Drive, before ending at an intersection with former Highway 11. The roadway continued through this intersection as Highway 11 (Holland Street East), turning southeast towards Newmarket and Toronto; Highway 11 continued northwards to Barrie along Barrie Street.

== History ==
The Old Plank Road (Main Street) in Bond Head, circa 1868, facing east along what would become Highway 88

The road that would become Highway 88 was originally built after an act to build and maintain the 7th concession of West Gwillimbury as a toll road was passed on April 20, 1836. The toll road connected Bond Head with Holland Landing and featured two toll booths: one at Middleton and the second on the south side of the Holland River. In the spring of 1851, planking of what was then known as the West Gwillimbury Road began under a funding agreement with the government of Upper Canada. It was completed in October, featuring 3-inch thick planks laid on stringers, and was wide enough for a wagon; the first "paved" road in Simcoe County. Loaded wagons had the right-of-way, and the well-established farmland around Bond Head led to it becoming a major transport route to markets in Toronto. Although initially profitable, the deteriorating condition of the planks, frequent upkeep, and payments to those injured by the condition of the road led to it costing money by 1857. Consequently, in October 1858, Simcoe County council repealed the act that established the plank road, and instructed the county surveyor to remove the planks and level the road.

Highway 88 overpass of Highway 400 in May 1962. New structures built in recent years have used recreated coat of arms as are visible on this structure.

The portion of the plank road between Bradford and Holland Landing followed what is now Bridge Street along the south side of the Ontario, Simcoe and Huron Railway (opened June 15, 1853, now the CNR and GO Transit Barrie line) across the Holland River, then crossed to the north side of the tracks, following what is still today known as Toll Road. A part of this, from Barrie Street in Bradford to the south side of the Holland River, was incorporated into Highway 11 on August 18, 1920. Highway 88 would be established nearly 18 years later, when the remainder of the former plank road between Bradford and Bond Head became a provincial highway on April 13, 1938. While still a dirt road, it was improved to a gravel surface the following year.

Planning for a new "superhighway" between Toronto and south of Barrie was carried out between 1944 and 1947, with construction beginning later that year. When Highway 400 fully opened to traffic on July 1, 1952, a cloverleaf interchange with Highway 88 was included. It was one of the last remaining in Ontario when the loops were removed in 2011, converting it to a diamond interchange. Highway 88 was paved in its entirety in 1956.

As part of a series of budget cuts initiated by premier Mike Harris under his Common Sense Revolution platform in 1995, numerous highways deemed to no longer be of significance to the provincial network were decommissioned and responsibility for the routes transferred to a lower level of government, a process referred to as downloading. Highway 88 was downloaded entirely on January 1, 1998, and transferred to Simcoe County, which designated it as County Road 88.

== Major intersections ==
The following table lists the major junctions along Highway 88, as noted by the Ministry of Transportation of Ontario. The entire route was located in Simcoe County.

Location	km	mi	Destinations	Notes
Bond Head	0.0	0.0	County Road 27 – Vaughan, Barrie	Formerly Highway 27
Bradford West Gwillimbury	3.9	2.4	Highway 400 – Toronto, Barrie	Exit 64
Bradford	8.4	5.2	Melbourne Drive / Professor Day Drive	Edge of Bradford urban area in 1997
Bradford	9.7	6.0	County Road 4 (Barrie Street) to Barrie; Bridge Street to Newmarket	Formerly Highway 11
1.000 mi = 1.609 km; 1.000 km = 0.621 mi: Closed/former
