= Ontario Highway 91 =

Former Ontario provincial highway

King's Highway 91

Route information
- Maintained by the Ministry of Transportation
- Length: 7.9 km (4.9 mi)
- Existed: August 11, 1937–January 1, 1998

Major junctions
- West end: Highway 24 in Duntroon
- East end: Highway 26 in Stayner

Location
- Country: Canada
- Province: Ontario
- Towns: Duntroon, Stayner

Highway system
- Ontario provincial highways; Current; Former; 400-series
| ← Highway 89 | → Highway 93 |
Former provincial highways
| ← Highway 90 | Highway 92 → |

King's Highway 91, commonly referred to as Highway 91, was a provincially maintained highway in the Canadian province of Ontario that connected Highway 24 south of Collingwood with Highway 26 in Stayner, a distance of 7.9 km (4.9 mi). The majority of the route travels through farmland, with the exception of the portion within Stayner. Highway 91 was established in mid 1937 along an existing road. Aside from paving in 1965, the highway remained unchanged until it was decommissioned at the beginning of 1998 and transferred to Simcoe County. Today the route is officially known as Simcoe County Road 91.

== Route description ==
Former Highway 91 facing west from Stayner

Highway 91 began at Highway 24 in the community of Duntroon, lying 10 km (6.2 mi) south of Collingwood within Simcoe County. From there it travelled east through farmland, passing north of the Stayner Aerodrome at its midpoint. East of Fairgrounds Road, the route entered Stayner. On the outskirts of the community several industrial and commercial buildings line the route, but are quickly replaced by residential housing moving eastward. In the centre of town, the highway encountered Highway 26 at its eastern terminus. Today, the route of former Highway 91 is known as Simcoe County Road 91. This route continues west of former Highway 24 to the Simcoe–Grey County boundary at Grey County Road 91. The entire route is straight, following an old concession line.

== History ==
The Duntroon to Stayner Road was first assumed by the Department of Highways as Highway 91 on August 11, 1937, the same date as the portion of Highway 24 lying within Simcoe County. Although some initial improvement was carried out on the muddy farm road, the new highway remained gravel-surfaced until 1965. Beyond that, the highway remained unaltered until it was transferred, or downloaded, to Simcoe County on January 1, 1998. Simcoe County subsequently redesignated the road as Simcoe County Road 91.

== Major intersections ==
The following table lists the major junctions along Highway 91, as noted by the Ministry of Transportation of Ontario. The entire route is located in Simcoe County.

| Location | km | mi | Destinations | Notes |
|---|---|---|---|---|
| Duntroon | 0.0 | 0.0 | Highway 24 – Collingwood | |
| Stayner | 6.6 | 4.1 | West Street | Stayner western limits; beginning of former Connecting Link agreement |
| Stayner | 7.9 | 4.9 | Highway 26 (King Street) – Barrie | End of former Connecting Link agreement |
1.000 mi = 1.609 km; 1.000 km = 0.621 mi
