= Ontario Highway 26 =

Ontario provincial highway

Highway 26
- A map of Highway 26; Highway 26 Connecting Links

Route information
- Maintained by the Ministry of Transportation of Ontario
- Length: 116.7 km (72.5 mi)
- Existed: July 2, 1927–present

Major junctions
- West end: Highway 6 / Highway 10 / Highway 21 in Owen Sound
- Hurontario Street
- East end: Highway 400 in Barrie

Location
- Country: Canada
- Province: Ontario
- Major cities: Owen Sound, Barrie
- Towns: Meaford, Collingwood, Wasaga Beach, Stayner (in Clearview)

Highway system
- Ontario provincial highways; Current; Former; 400-series
← Highway 24	→ Highway 27
Former provincial highways
← Highway 25

King's Highway 26, commonly referred to as Highway 26, is a provincially maintained highway in the Canadian province of Ontario, connecting the cities of Owen Sound and Barrie. Between these two cities, the highway serves the southern shoreline of Georgian Bay, passing through Meaford, Collingwood and Stayner, as well as passing the Blue Mountain Resort. In addition, the highway serves as the main route to Wasaga Beach, a popular recreational destination during the summer months.

Highway 26 was first assumed by the Department of Highways, predecessor to the Ministry of Transportation of Ontario, in 1927, along an existing trunk route between Barrie and Owen Sound. Various bypasses, mostly around Collingwood, have improved the route through the intervening years.

== Route description ==
Highway 26 facing west towards Owen Sound; the highway dives through several large valleys between here and Meaford.

Highway 26 serves as a major link between Barrie and the Greater Toronto Area, via Highway 400, and the popular tourist region on the southern shore of Georgian Bay. Over the past several years the popularity of this region has increased, and traffic levels have increased accordingly. The routing of the highway takes it from the junction with Highway 6, Highway 10 and Highway 21 in Owen Sound to its terminus at Highway 400 in Barrie at the Bayfield street interchange. For a time, the highway continued southward to Dunlop street, formerly Highway 11, in Barrie, cosigned with Highway 27. The southern portion of Bayfield street was downloaded to the City of Barrie along with Dunlop street in 1997, when these sections of Highway 27 and Highway 11 were eliminated. This shortened the highway's length by 1.2 kilometres (0.75 mi) and removed the 7.2-kilometre (4.5 mi) concurrency with Highway 27. The current length of the highway is 116.7 kilometres (72.5 mi).

Highway 26 between Owen Sound and Meaford in the west is not as highly travelled as the tourist areas to the east. From Meaford eastwards, the highway runs along the Georgian Bay shoreline, and in The Blue Mountains, extending from Thornbury eastwards through to the west limits of Collingwood. It passes through a nearly continuous corridor of low-density resort-style residential developments, mostly concentrated in the Blue Mountain Resort area. Between Collingwood and Wasaga Beach, the highway is a four-lane divided roadway with roundabouts transitioning to the undivided sections at both ends: one at Mosely Street in Wasaga Beach, and the other at Poplar Sideroad in Collingwood.

It is also not a very straight route, as the highway makes four 90 degree turns: three at signalised intersections, including at High Street in western Collingwood, Hume Street in eastern Collingwood, the intersection with Simcoe Roads 91 and 42 in Stayner, and the unsignalised junction with Simcoe Road 27 (formerly Highway 27) north of Barrie.

Several portions of Highway 26 are maintained under a Connecting Link agreement. Within Owen Sound, Meaford, Thornbury, Collingwood, Stayner and Barrie, maintenance of the route is shared between the MTO and the local municipality.

== History ==
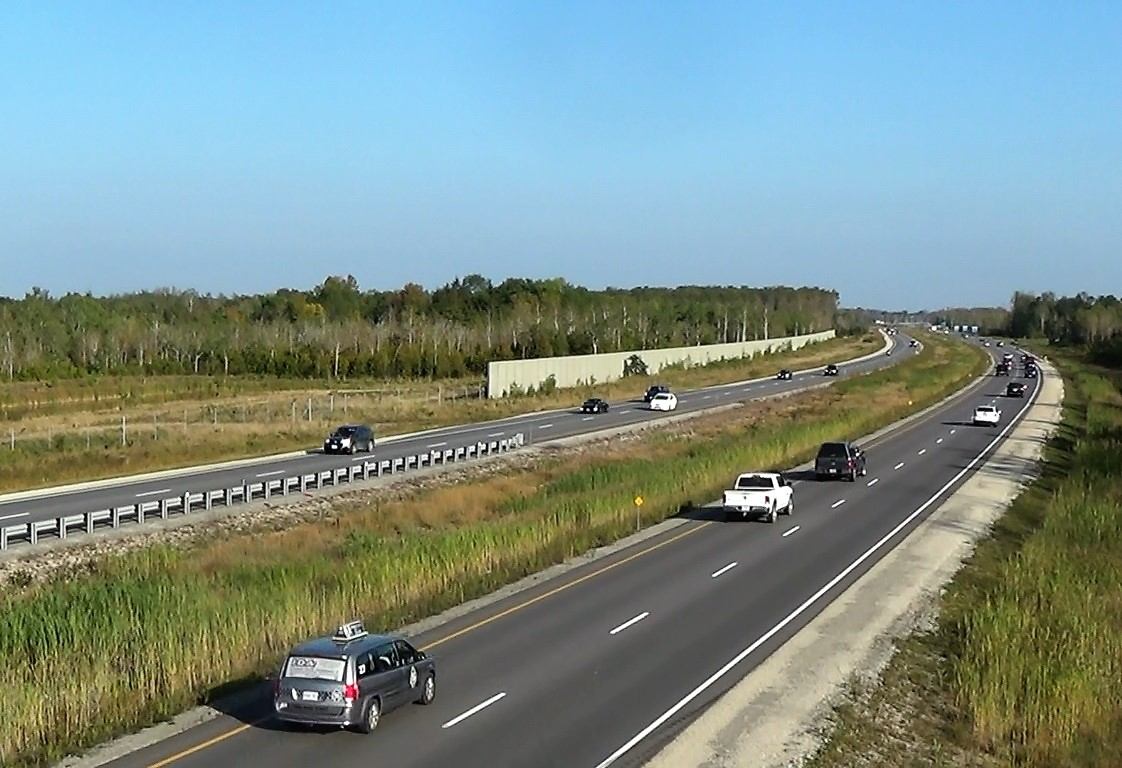
The Highway 26 bypass between Collingwood and Wasaga Beach

Highway 26 was first assumed by the Department of Highways on July 2, 1927, along an existing trunk route between Barrie and Owen Sound. It began at a shared terminus with Highway 6 and Highway 10 in downtown Owen Sound, at the present intersection of 2nd Avenue East and 10th Street, and travelled 120.3 kilometres (74.8 mi) to Highway 11 in Barrie, at the intersection of Bayfield Street and Dunlop Street.

When it was established, the route was paved between Meaford and Thornbury, as well as for approximately 20 kilometres (12 mi) east of Owen Sound through Woodford; the remainder was gravel-surfaced. The gap between Woodford and Meaford was paved in 1930, followed by the section from the current intersection of Simcoe County Road 53 (Wilson Drive) east to Midhurst and south to Highway 11 in Barrie in 1931. In 1932, the section from the Grey and Simcoe County boundary (at Simcoe County Road 34 / Grey County Road 21) to Stayner was paved. Due to the lack of resource available at the height of the depression, a 3-metre (10 ft)-wide pavement (one lane) was constructed approximately 20 kilometres (12 mi) east from Stayner to the present intersection of Simcoe County Road 22 (Horseshoe Valley Road West). The gap between there, through Minesing, to Simcoe County Road 53 was paved with a single lane in 1934. That year also aw the section between Thornbury and the Simcoe–Grey County line paved, completing a continuous pavement between Owen Sound and Barrie. The second lane of pavement between Stayner and west of Midhurst was completed over a decade later, in 1947.

Construction of the bypass at the Mosley Street roundabout in Wasaga Beach in July 2012

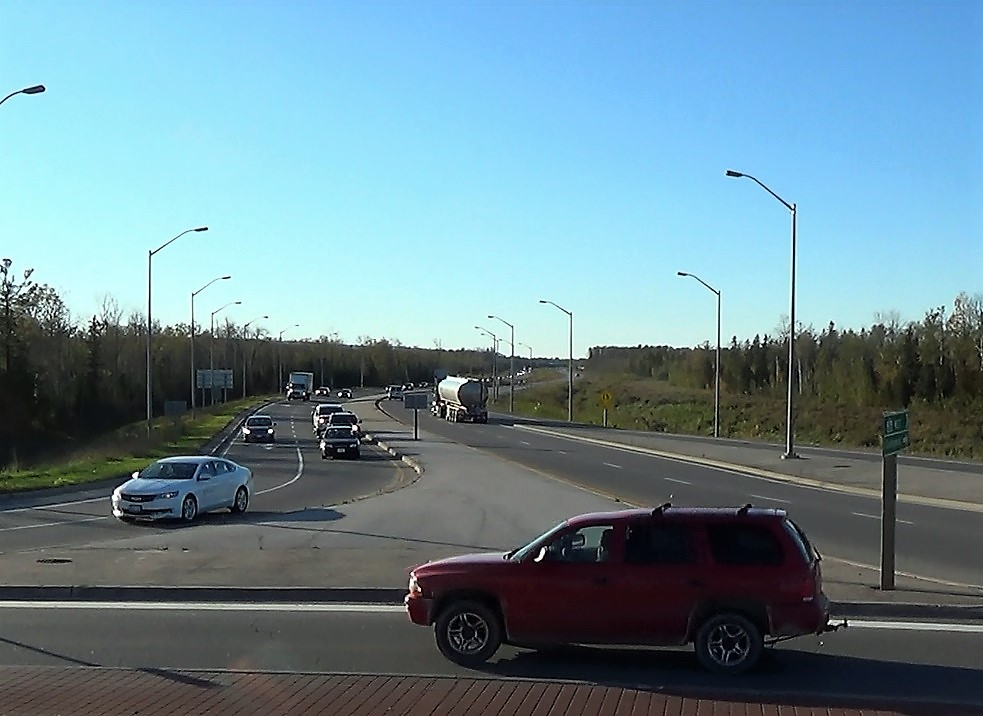
The roundabout in 2017

Since then, the route has remained almost unchanged, except in the Collingwood and Barrie areas. Prior to the completion of the Pretty River Parkway in Collingwood in the mid-1970s, Highway 26 was routed through Collingwood along Hume Street, before making a 90 degree right turn (north) at the intersection with Highway 24 (Now Simcoe Road 124, Hurontario Street) with which it was concurrent until the terminus of Highway 24 at First Street, where Highway 26 makes a 90 degree left turn (west) onto First Street, continuing on the present route. The Pretty River Parkway was a bypass of this highly congested downtown route, branching off to the north from Hume Street and swinging gradually westward along the shoreline until becoming Huron Street, which is the eastward extension of First Street beyond Hurontario. In 2003, Pretty River Parkway was widened to four lanes to match the existing sections of Huron and First Streets.

In 2001, the Georgian Triangle Area Transportation Study determined that traffic levels along Highway 26 both east and west of Collingwood were exceeding capacity. The Simcoe Area Transportation Network Needs Assessment repeated this analysis the following year. Subsequently, work on a new bypass east of Collingwood began on April 11, 2003. The old route was a dangerous section of road with numerous intersecting side streets and private residences with direct highway entrances, while the bypass is a fully-controlled access four-lane divided highway without any at-grade crossings. The new alignment has the highway veer west in the west end of Wasaga Beach, and from a roundabout with Mosley Street it runs parallel to and south of the old route to a roundabout at Poplar Sideroad, near the eastern town limits of Collingwood. The bypass opened on November 14, 2012. The former route is now known as Beachwood Road from Collingwood to Mosley Street in Wasaga Beach. The remaining section of the former alignment south of Mosley Street has been renamed Lyons Court.

Within Barrie, a portion of Highway 26 was transferred to the city in 1998, truncating it at Highway 400. This former portion is now known simply as Bayfield Street.

== Major intersections ==
The following table lists the major junctions along Highway 26, as noted by the Ministry of Transportation of Ontario.

Division	Location	km	mi	Destinations	Notes
Grey	Owen Sound	0.0	0.0	Highway 6 / Highway 10 south / Highway 21 south (9th Avenue E / 10th Street E) – Chatsworth, Shallow Lake, Southampton	Beginning of Owen Sound Connecting Link agreement; Highway 26 western terminus
Grey	Owen Sound	1.7	1.1	14th Avenue E	End of Owen Sound Connecting Link agreement
Grey	Owen Sound	3.0	1.9	County Road 5 south (28th Avenue E)	Owen Sound city limits
Grey	Meaford	4.4	2.7	County Road 15 north	
Grey	Meaford	5.8	3.6	County Road 11 south	
Grey	Meaford	15.4	9.6	County Road 18 south	Woodford
Grey	Meaford	22.3	13.9	County Road 112	
Grey	Meaford	26.7	16.6		Beginning of Meaford Connecting Link agreement
Grey	Meaford	28.2	17.5	County Road 12 west (Nelson Street)	
Grey	Meaford	29.6	18.4	County Road 7 south (St. Vincent Street)	
Grey	Meaford	30.0	18.6		End of Meaford Connecting Link agreement
Grey	The Blue Mountains	38.9	24.2	County Road 113 east (10th Line)	
Grey	The Blue Mountains	39.8	24.7	Peel Street	Beginning of Thornbury Connecting Link agreement
Grey	The Blue Mountains	40.9	25.4	County Road 13 south (Bruce Street)	
Grey	The Blue Mountains	42.1	26.2	Grey Street	End of Thornbury Connecting Link agreement
Grey	The Blue Mountains	42.7	26.5	County Road 2 south	
Grey	The Blue Mountains	45.3	28.1	County Road 40 west	
Grey	The Blue Mountains	52.3	32.5	County Road 19 south	Craigleith
Grey–Simcoe boundary	The Blue Mountains–Collingwood boundary	55.0	34.2	County Road 21 south / County Road 34 south (Osler Bluff Road) / Long Point Road	Beginning of Collingwood Connecting Link agreement
Simcoe	Collingwood	62.2	38.6	Hurontario Street	Formerly Highway 24 south; to County Road 124 south
Simcoe	Collingwood	66.5	41.3	County Road 32 west (Poplar Sideroad)	End of Collingwood Connecting Link agreement; beginning of 4-lane divided highway
Simcoe	Wasaga Beach	72.2	44.9	Mosley Street / Nottawasaga Sideroad 33/34	End of 4-lane divided highway; formerly Highway 92 east / County Road 33 west
Simcoe	Clearview	73.8	45.9	County Road 64 east	
Simcoe	Clearview	75.6	47.0	County Road 96 east (Nottawasaga Sideroad 27/28)	
Simcoe	Clearview	75.7	47.0		Beginning of Stayner Connecting Link agreement
Simcoe	Clearview	77.4	48.1	County Road 91 west (Main Street W) County Road 42 east (King Street S)	Formerly Highway 91 west; to Airport Road
Simcoe	Clearview	78.2	48.6	Mowat Street	End of Stayner Connecting Link agreement
Simcoe	Clearview	80.0	49.7	County Road 7 north	
Simcoe	Clearview	86.7	53.9	County Road 10 (Sunnidale Road)	Sunnidale Corners
Simcoe	Springwater	99.2	61.6	County Road 22 east (Horseshoe Valley Road) – Horseshoe Valley	
Simcoe	Springwater	102.0	63.4	County Road 28 south (George Johnson Road)	Minesing
Simcoe	Springwater	107.3	66.7	County Road 53 south (Wilson Drive)	
Simcoe	Springwater (Midhurst)	110.8	68.8	County Road 27 north	Formerly Highway 27 north; former western end of Highway 27 concurrency
Simcoe	Springwater (Midhurst)	111.6	69.3	County Road 43 west (Snow Valley Road) / Finlay Mill Road	
Barrie		114.2	71.0		Barrie city limits; beginning of Barrie Connecting Link agreement
Barrie		116.7	72.5	Highway 400 – Sudbury, North Bay, Toronto	Highway 26 eastern terminus; Highway 400 exit 98; cities not listed on signage
Barrie		117.9	73.3	Dunlop Street	Former Highway 26 eastern terminus; formerly Highway 11 / Highway 27 south
1.000 mi = 1.609 km; 1.000 km = 0.621 mi: Closed/former

== Gallery ==
Highway 26 facing north through Meaford

Highway 26 serves the southern shoreline of Georgian Bay, but seldom comes within sight of it. This section southeast of Thornbury is one of the few exceptions.

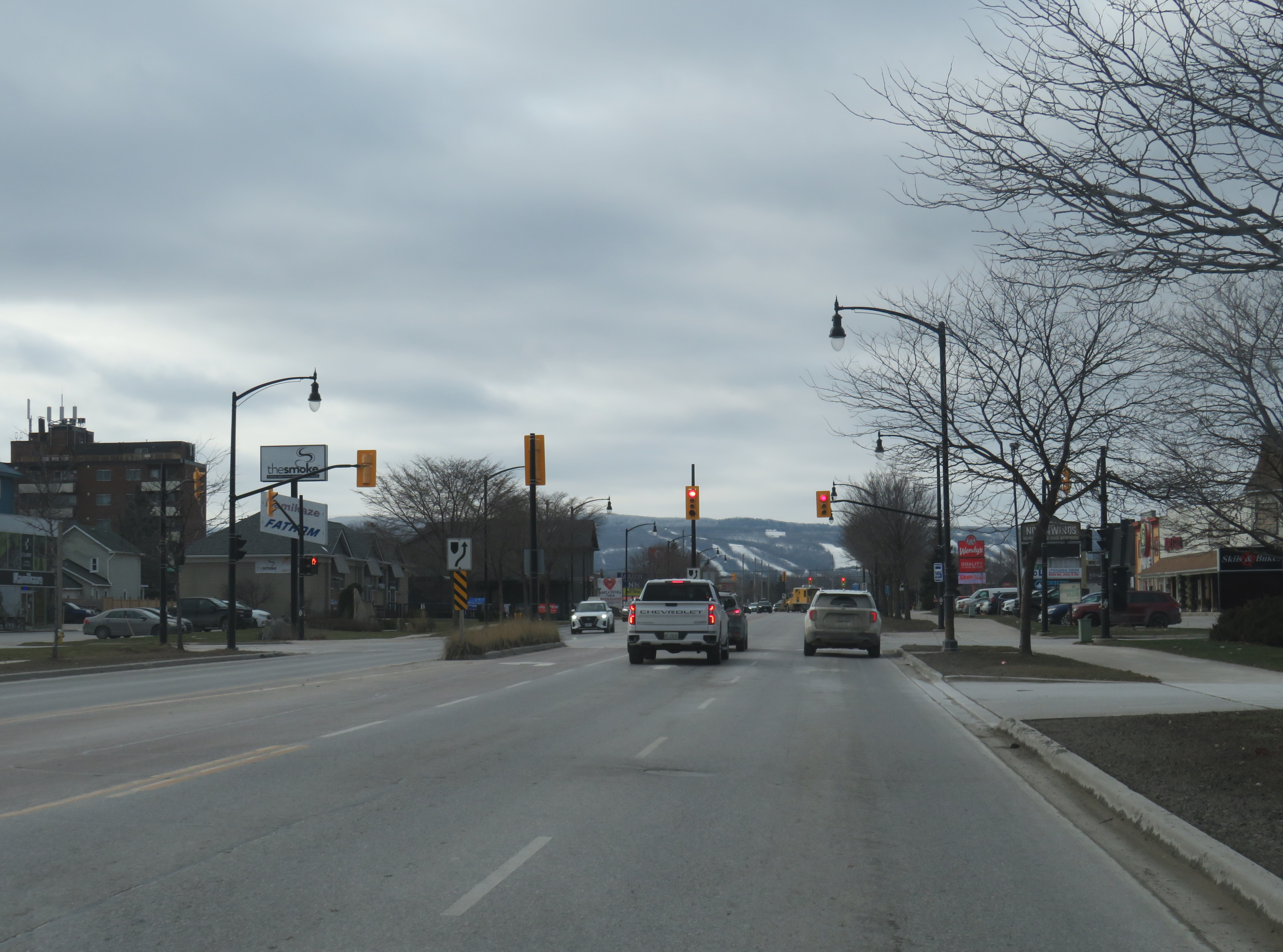
Highway 26 as First Street in Collingwood, facing west towards Blue Mountain

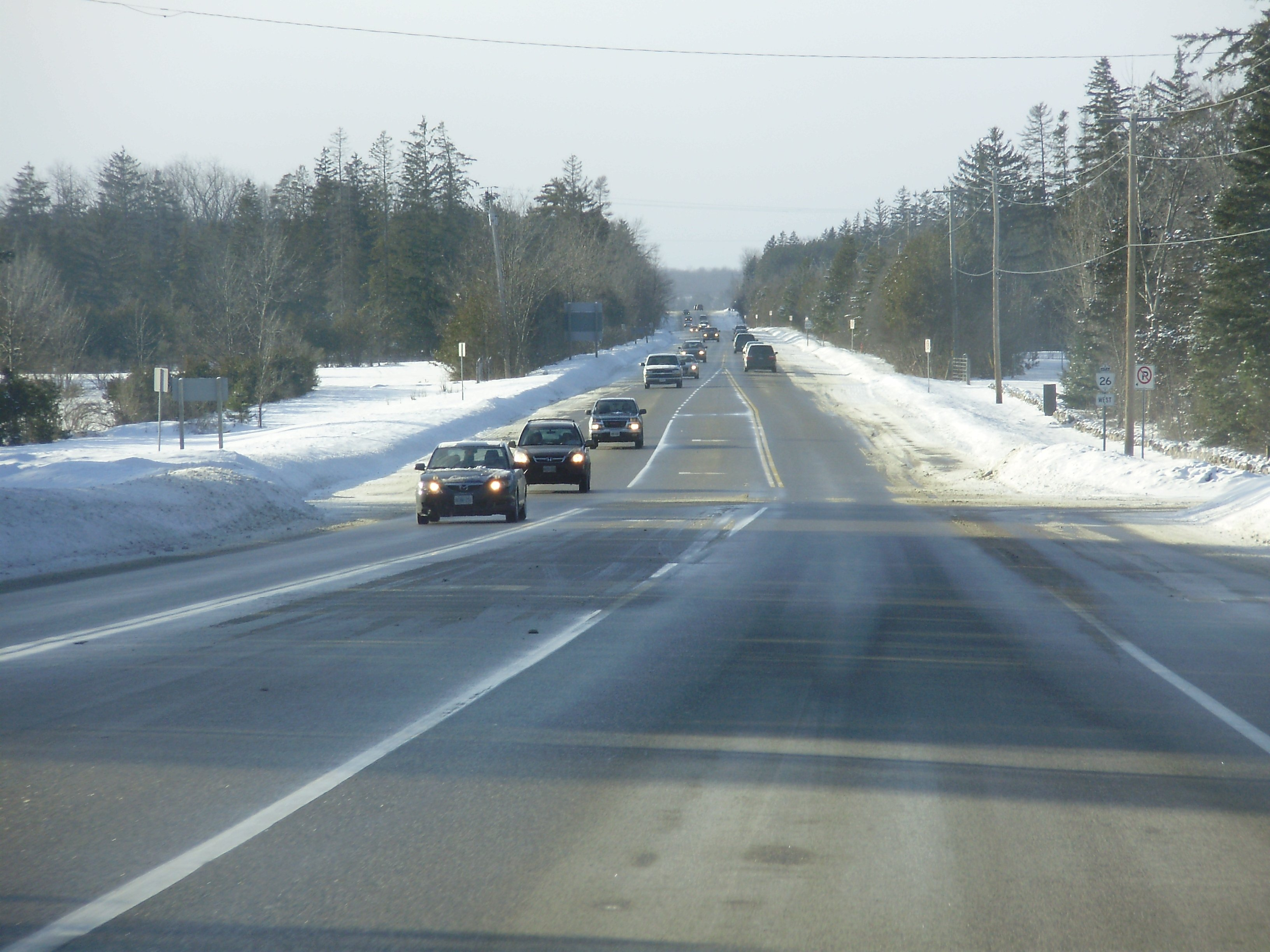
Highway 26 in Springwater, facing west
