= List of numbered roads in Grey County =

This is a list of numbered county roads in Grey County, Ontario.

County Road #	Local name(s)	Southern/Western Terminus	Northern/Eastern Terminus	Settlements served	Additional Notes
	County Road 1	10th Street, Owen Sound	Bruce County line	Owen Sound, Balmy Beach, East Linton, Hogg, Big Bay, Oxenden	
	County Road 2	Melancthon-Osprey Townline	Highway 26	Victoria Corners, Ravenna, Kolapore, Feversham, Maxwell	
	County Road 3	Minto-Normanby Townline	Highway 21	Ayton, Lamlash, Louise, Peabody, Keady, Jackson	
	County Road 4	Bruce County line	Simcoe County Road 124	Hanover, Allan Park, Vickers, Durham, Glen, Priceville, Ceylon, Flesherton, Rock Mills, Maxwell	a.k.a. 10th Street in Hanover, Bruce Street and Lambton Street in Durham, and Collingwood Street in Flesherton, formerly Ontario Highway 4
	28th Avenue; 8th Street; 2nd Avenue; County Road 5	Grey - Bruce Line (County Line with Bruce County)	Highway 26	Owen Sound	
	County Road 6	Highway 89	Highway 6	none	minor connecting route
	County Road 7	County Road 13	Highway 26	Epping, Griersville, Kent, Meaford	
	County Road 8	Highway 89	County road 9	none	minor rural route
	Queen Street; County Road 9 Main street	County Road 10	Highway 10	Neustadt, Ayton, Nenagh, Orchardville, Hopeville, Dundalk	
	County Road 10, Grey-Bruce Line	Wellington County limits	Highway 6	Hepworth, Park Head, Alvanley, Scone, Elmwood, Hanover, Neustadt, Moltke, Biemans Corners	Grey Road 10 from the Wellington County Boundary to Grey Road 28, Jacob Street in Neustadt, 7th Avenue in Hanover, Signed as Bruce Road 10 between Hanover and Scone but under the jurisdiction of Grey County, Grey-Bruce Line between Scone and Alvanley, and Bruce Road 10 between Alvanley and Hepworth.
	County Road 11	County Road 18	Highway 26	none	minor rural route
	County Road 12	Highway 6	Highway 26	Meaford, Oxmead, Temple Hill, Goring, Markdale, Barhead, Waudby	a.k.a. Nelson Street in Meaford and Main Street in Markdale
	County Road 13	County Road 4	Highway 26	Thornbury, Clarksburg, Slabtown, Heathcote, Kimberley, Eugenia	
	County Road 14	Highway 89	County Road 4	Hopeville, Gildale, Cedarville, Conn	
	County Road 15	County Road 5 (6th St E)	Highway 26	Owen Sound, Leith, Annan	
	County Road 16	Grey-Bruce Line	Highway 6	Keady	
	Gordon Sutherland Parkway; County Road 17	County Road 17B	Highway 6	Benallen, Copperkettle, Wolseley, Zion	
	County Road 17A	County Road 17	County Road 1	none	minor connecting route
	Derby-Sarawak Townline	Highway 6	Highway 21	Owen Sound	
	Concession 5 Derby; Derry Line; 1st Concession	Highway 21	Highway 26	Springmount, Squire, Rockford, Woodford	
	County Road 19	County Road 2	Highway 26	Castle Glen, McMurchy Settlement, Craigleith	
	Osler Bluff Road	County Road 19	Highway 26	Mair Mills	
	County Road 23	County Road 4	County Road 9	Glen, Dromore	
	County Road 25	Grey-Bruce Line	Highway 6	Dornoch	
	Durham Road West	County Road 4	Highway 6	Durham	
	Concession 2 Drive In Road; Concession 18	County Road 10	County Road 10	none	Hanover suburban route
	County Road 29	County Road 40	County Road 18	Bognor, Walters Falls	
	County Road 30	County Road 12	County Road 13	Hutchisons Corners	
	County Road 31	County Road 2	Simcoe County line	Rob Roy	
	County Road 32	Highway 10	County Road 30	Vandeleur	
	County Road 40	Grey-Bruce Line	Highway 26	Chatsworth, Desboro, Marmion	a.k.a. McNab Street in Chatsworth
	County Road 109	County Road 6	County Road 9	Holstein	
	9th Line	County Road 12	Central Area Army Training Centre	none	service road to National Defence facility
	Alfred Street West	County Road 13	Highway 26	Thornbury	
	Grey Road 119, Scenic Caves Road	County Road 13	County Road 19	Craigleith	
	County Road 124	Melancthon-Osprey Townline / Dufferin County line	Simcoe County Road 124	Maple Valley, Singhampton	Formerly Highway 24. Runs concurrently with Simcoe County Road 124
	County Road 170; Cruikshank Street	Highway 6	County Road 17	Copperkettle, Shouldice, Shallow Lake	
