= Trafalgar Road =

Road in Southern Ontario, Canada

- Halton Regional Road 3 Wellington Road 24; Dufferin Road 24
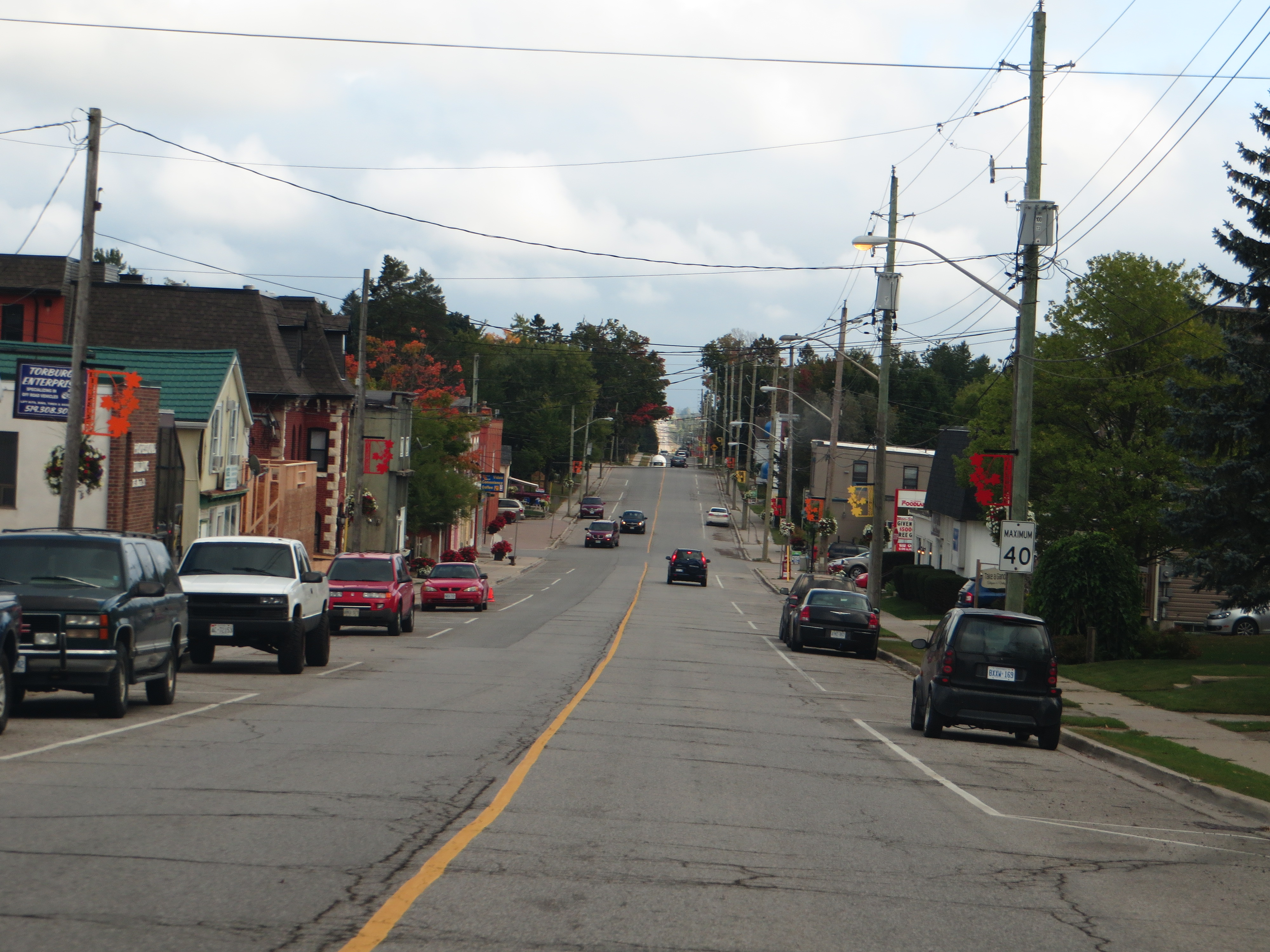
- View of southbound Trafalgar Road in Hillsburgh
- Former names: 7th Line; 14th Line; Dundas Street
- Namesake: Trafalgar Township
- Maintained by: Region of Halton; Wellington County; Dufferin County
- Length: 70 km (43 mi)
- South end: Lakeshore Road in Oakville
- Major junctions: QEW/Highway 403; Dundas Street; Burnhamthorpe Road; Highway 401; Steeles Avenue; 17 Sideroad/Maple Avenue; Highway 7 Halton-Erin Road/32 Sideroad/Wellington Road 42; Wellington Road 124; Wellington Road 22; Erin-East Garafraxa Townline; Orangeville-Fergus Road
- North end: Dufferin Road 109 in East Garafraxa

Other
Nearby arterial roads
← Neyagawa Boulevard / James Snow Parkway	Mountainview Road; 9 Line; Wellington Road 23 →

Trafalgar Road is a long north-south roadway located in Halton Region, Wellington County, and Dufferin County, Ontario, Canada. The road begins at Lakeshore Road (formerly the Highway 2) in Oakville and ends at Dufferin County Road 109 (formerly the Highway 9) in East Garafraxa.

A part of the road is superseded with the Highway 7 northwest of Georgetown.

== History ==
The road was once named 7th Line, later on being renamed a couple more times until it's renamed to its current name after the amalgamation of Oakville and Trafalgar Township. The road is named after the former township, which in turn was named after Cape Trafalgar when English fleets defeated Spanish and French fleets at the Battle of Trafalgar.

In 1831, 7th Line was built so people can move to Oakville from Lower Base Line. Several years later, the road had to be boarded with wood because of the traffic.

During the 1850s, the road was made as a toll road because of maintenance The tolls later on stopped being collected and the state of the road later on turned back into dirt. The main exporting product (wheat) was transported using this specific road for shipping. Some businessmen took advantage of the production they had to buy plots of land from the farmers to build warehouses for the product.

Trafalgar Road was once part of the former Highway 25 starting from Wellington Road 124 until it's fully downgraded in 1996.

== Route Description ==
Starting southbound, Trafalgar Road starts at a dead end in Oakville, later on passing downtown. It later on follows part of the Sixteen Mile Creek and then slants on to the interchange with the Queen Elizabeth Way. It later on passes through some urbanized areas until Dundas Street and later on passes through some rural areas, passing Burnhamthorpe Road, and interchanging with the Highway 407, followed by Lower Base Line and Britannia Road, passing Drumquin, then Agerton.

After passing Derry Road, it interchanges with the Highway 401 where you pass the Toronto Premium Outlets at the intersection with Steeles Avenue, followed with a western curve in Hornby. At 15 Sideroad, you get to pass the community of Stewarttown, and later on Georgetown. It later on supersedes with the Highway 7 for 3 kilometres until it gets back to itself passing the community of Silver Creek. After 4 kilometres, the road passes the community of Ballinafad and enters Wellington County.

In Wellington County, it passes Wellington Road 50 and then later on the former Highway 24. After passing that, the road curves slightly to the left and approaches the community of Hillsburgh, later intersecting the Elora Cataract Trailway. After 3 kilometres, the road curves slightly west again approaching Dufferin County. The road ends at the former Highway 9.

== Public Transit ==
In Oakville, the road is served by Oakville Transit as Line 1, starting at the Oakville GO Station ending at a Park & Ride near the Highway 407. It has 2 major stops at the line one near the Oakville Campus of Sheridan College and the other one near the intersection of Dundas (Uptown Core). There are no other public transit services.
