= List of numbered roads in Wellington County =

List of county roads

This page lists all of the numbered county roads in Wellington County, Ontario, Canada.

In the late 1990s, when the provincial government downloaded many portions of Ontario highways to the municipalities, Wellington County became responsible for portions of former highways 9, 23, 24 and 25. These are now named 109, 123, 124 and 125 respectively. Currently, five provincial highways run through Wellington County. These are highways 6, 7, 9, 23, and 89.

Road numbers in Wellington County mainly follow a system in which the numbers correspond to the township in which the road has its county terminus. Roads 1-6 are in Minto; 7-12 in Mapleton; 14-16 in Wellington North; 17-21 in Centre Wellington; 22-26 in Erin; 27-29 in former Eramosa Township (now a part of Guelph-Eramosa); and 30-41 in former Guelph Township (also now a part of Guelph-Eramosa) and Puslinch, many of which are roads that originate in the City of Guelph. Highways 86 and 87 are named for the county road of the same name that continue past the boundaries of Waterloo Region and Huron County respectively. Highway 46 is the former routing of Highway 6 before the highway was rerouted along the Hanlon Parkway. All other roads were numbered after this system was put into place, and are mostly very short routes connecting villages or other points of interest to the main county road system.

| Arterial Sign | Name | Western/Southern Terminus | Eastern/Northern Terminus | Township | Major Communities |
|---|---|---|---|---|---|
| 1 | Heritage St. through Clifford | Highway 9 at Clifford | Minto-Normanby Townline at Grey County boundary | Minto | Clifford |
| 2 | Mill St. through Clifford | Highway 9 at Clifford | Highway 89 | Minto | Clifford, Drew |
| 3 | Ayton Rd. | CR 2 at Drew | Minto-Normanby Townline at Grey County boundary | Minto | Drew |
| 4 | | Huron County boundary | Highway 23 at Palmerston | Minto | Palmerston |
| 5 | Whites Rd. | CR 123 at Palmerston | CR 109 | Minto | Palmerston |
| 6 | Seven Bridges Road | CR 109 near Teviotdale | Highway 89 near Mount Forest at Grey County boundary | Wellington North/Minto boundary | |
| 7 | Elora Rd.; Guelph Rd. through Elora and Salem | Highway 6 North of Guelph | CR 109 at Teviotdale | Guelph-Eramosa, Centre Wellington, Mapleton | Elora, Salem, Alma, Rothsay, Teviotdale |
| 8 | Main St. through Drayton | CR 17 | CR 9, Perth County boundary | Mapleton | Drayton |
| 8 | King St. through Palmerston | CR 123 | Perth County boundary | Minto | Palmerston |
| 9 | | Waterloo Region boundary at Regional Road 86 | CR 123 and CR 109 at Teviotdale | Mapleton | Teviotdale |
| 10 | McGivern St. and Muir St. through Moorefield; Catherine St. South through Rothsay | Waterloo Region boundary at Regional Road 86 | CR 109 | Mapleton | Moorefield, Rothsay |
| 11 | Wellington Street through Drayton | Waterloo Region boundary at Regional Road 86 | CR 109 | Mapleton | Drayton |
| 12 | | Waterloo Region boundary at Regional Road 86 | CR 109 in Arthur | Mapleton, Wellington North | Arthur |
| 14 | Conn Rd.; Charles St. West, Frederick St. and Eliza St. through Arthur | CR 109 in Arthur | Highway 89 at Conn | Wellington North | Arthur, Conn |
| 15 | | CR 15 at Monck | East Luther-West Luther Townline, Dufferin County boundary | Wellington North | Monck |
| 16 | | CR 19 near Belwood | Highway 89 | Centre Wellington, Wellington North | Monck, Damascus |
| 17 | Peel St. through Alma | Waterloo Region boundary at Arthur St. North | Highway 6 | Mapleton/Centre Wellington boundary | Alma |
| 18 | Woolwich St. through Salem; Geddes St., Metcalfe St. and East Mill St. through Elora; St. Andrew St. and Belsyde Ave. through Fergus; Orangeville Rd. after Fergus | Waterloo Region boundary turns into Regional Road 22 | Dufferin County boundary at East Garafraxa-West Garafraxa Townline | Centre Wellington | Salem, Elora, Fergus |
| 19 | Belwood Rd.; Garafraxa St. East through Fergus | Highway 6 in Fergus | Dufferin County boundary at East Garafraxa-West Garafraxa Townline | Centre Wellington | Fergus, Belwood |
| 21 | South River Rd. | Waterloo Region boundary at Woolwich-Pilkington Townline | CR 7 at Elora | Centre Wellington | Inverhaugh, Elora |
| 22 | | Highway 6 | Peel Region boundary at CR 25 | Centre Wellington/Guelph-Eramosa boundary, Erin | Hillsburgh |
| 23 | Shamrock Rd. through Erin | CR 124 at Erin | CR 22 | Erin | Erin |
| 24 | Trafalgar Rd.; Main St. through Hillsburgh | Halton Region boundary at CR 42 | Dufferin County boundary at Erin-East Garafraxa Townline | Erin | Brisbane, Hillsburgh |
| 25 | Winston Churchill Boulevard | Halton Region boundary at CR 42 | CR 22 | Erin | |
| 26 | Eramosa-Erin Townline | CR 124 | CR 19 at Belwood | Guelph-Eramosa/Erin boundary, Centre Wellington | Belwood |
| 27 | Main St. North through Rockwood | Highway 7 in Rockwood | CR 124 at Brucedale | Guelph-Eramosa | Rockwood, Brucedale |
| 29 | | Halton Region boundary at Barden St. (Eden Mills) | CR 18 at Fergus | Guelph-Eramosa, Centre Wellington | Eramosa, Fergus |
| 30 | Marden Rd. | Waterloo Region boundary at Woolwich-Guelph Townline | Highway 6 at Marden | Guelph-Eramosa | Marden |
| 31 | CR 32 | Waterloo Region boundary at Woolwich-Guelph Townline | City of Guelph boundary at Whitelaw Rd. | Guelph-Eramosa | |
| 32 | | Waterloo Region boundary at CR 33 | Highway 7 | Puslinch, Guelph-Eramosa | |
| 33 | Townline Rd. through Cambridge | Waterloo Region boundary at Gore Rd. | CR 34 | Puslinch | |
| 34 | | Waterloo Region boundary at CR 33 | Halton Region boundary at Concession 11 | Puslinch | Aberfoyle |
| 35 | Downey Rd. | City of Guelph boundary at Forestell Rd. | City of Hamilton boundary at Gore Rd. | Puslinch | |
| 36 | Badenoch St. through Morriston | Highway 6 in Morriston | Halton Region boundary at Concession 11 | Puslinch | Morriston |
| 37 | Arkell Rd. | City of Guelph boundary at Victoria Rd. | Halton Region boundary at Nassagaweya-Puslinch Townline | Puslinch | Arkell |
| 38 | Victoria Rd. | City of Guelph boundary at Speed River | Highway 6 | Guelph-Eramosa | |
| 39 | Silvercreek Parkway | City of Guelph boundary | CR 51 | Guelph-Eramosa | |
| 41 | Watson Rd. | CR 37 at Arkell | City of Guelph boundary at Stone Rd. | Puslinch | Arkell |
| 42 | Ballinafad Rd. | CR 24 at Ballinafad | Peel Region boundary at CR 25 | Erin | |
| 43 | Scotland St. and Gartshore St. through Fergus | CR 18 (Belsyde Ave.) Fergus | Sideroad 10 North of Fergus | Centre Wellington | Fergus |
| 44 | Guelph Line | Halton Region boundary at Wilson St. (Eden Mills) | Highway 7 | Guelph-Eramosa | |
| 45 | | CR 12 | CR 11 | Mapleton | |
| 46 | Brock Rd.; Queen St. through Morriston | City of Guelph boundary at Maltby Rd. | Highway 401 | Puslinch | Aberfoyle |
| 49 | Wellington St. through Everton | Eramosa River, Everton | CR 124 | Guelph-Eramosa | Everton |
| 50 | Harris St. through Rockwood | Highway 7 in Rockwood | CR 24 | Guelph-Eramosa | Rockwood |
| 51 | | CR 86 at Ariss | Highway 6 | Guelph-Eramosa | Ariss |
| 52 | | CR 124 (Main St.) in Erin | Peel Region boundary at CR 25 | Erin | Erin |
| 53 | | CR 34 | Wellington Road 54 | Puslinch | |
| 54 | | Concession 7 in Puslinch | City of Guelph boundary at Crawley Road and Maltby Road West | Puslinch | |
| 86 | | City of Guelph boundary | Waterloo Region boundary at Sideroad 16 | Guelph-Eramosa | Ariss |
| 87 | | Huron County boundary at Howick-Minto Line | Highway 23 at Harriston | Minto | |
| 109 | Elora Rd. from Harriston to Teviotdale (Elora Rd. continues on CR 7); Catherine St. through Arthur; Formerly Highway 9 | Highway 89 in Harriston | Dufferin County boundary at East Garafraxa-West Garafraxa Townline | Minto, Mapleton, Wellington North | Harriston, Teviotdale, Arthur |
| 123 | Main St. through Palmerston; Formerly Highway 23 | Highway 23 in Palmerston | CR 109 at Teviotdale | Minto | Palmerston |
| 124 | Eramosa Rd.; Main St. through Erin; Formerly Highway 24 | Waterloo Region boundary at Guelph Twp Rd. 1 | Peel Region boundary at CR 25 | Guelph-Eramosa, Erin | Eramosa, Brucedale, Ospringe, Brisbane, Erin |
| 125 | Formerly Ontario Highway 25 | Halton Region boundary at Erin-Halton Hills Townline | CR 124 at Ospringe | Erin | Ospringe |
