= Palermo, Ontario =

Palermo Hagartown
- Former hamlet
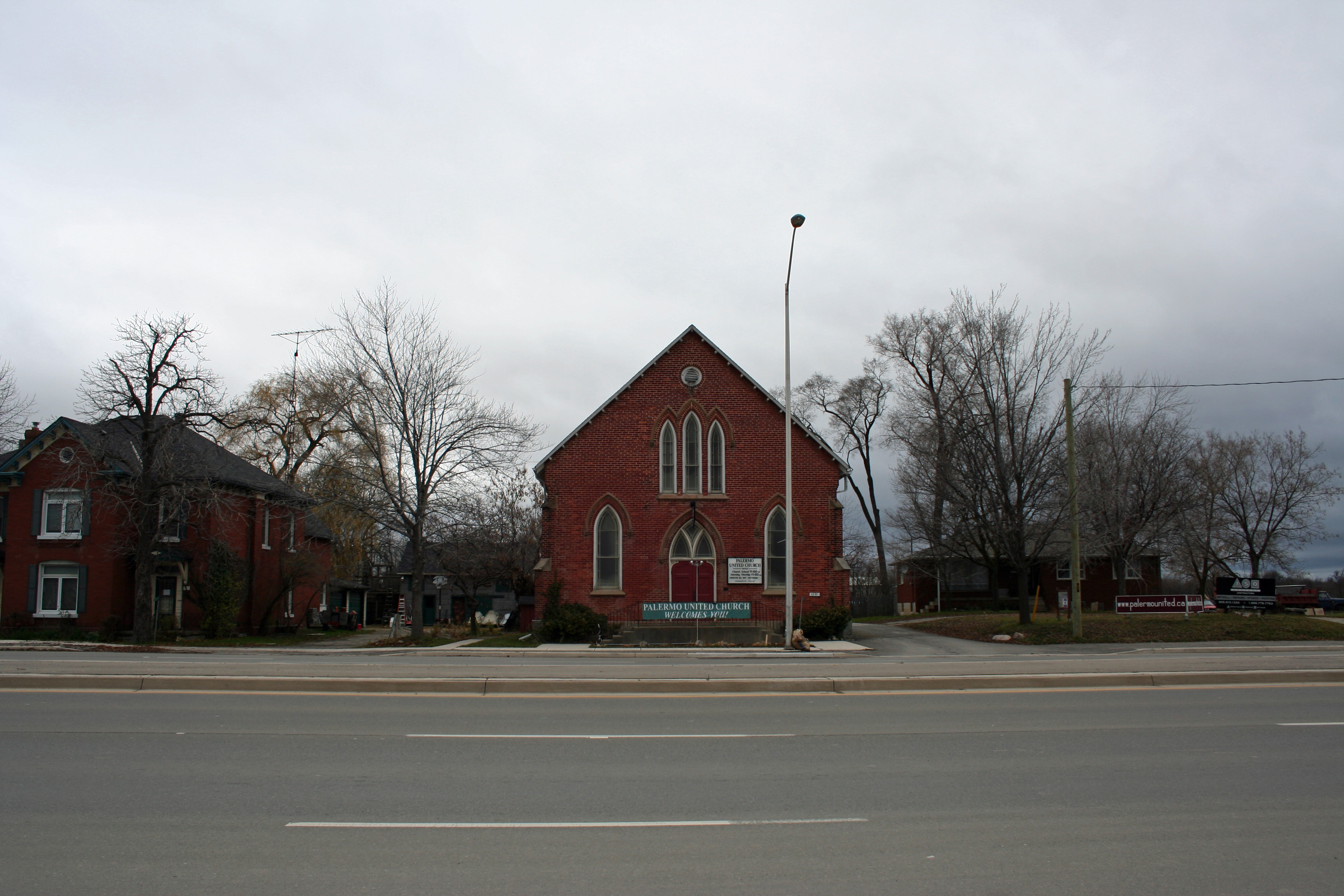
- Palermo United Church

- Location of Palermo, Ontario Palermo (Southern Ontario)
- Coordinates: 43.43464°N 79.77748°W
- Country: Canada
- Province: Ontario
- Regional municipality: Halton Region
- Town: Oakville
- Established: 1805
- Renamed: 1836
- Amalgamated: 1962
- Founder: Lawrence Hagar
- Time zone: UTC-5 (Eastern (EST))
  - Summer (DST): UTC-4 (EDT)
- Postal code: L6M

Palermo, founded as Hagartown, is a former hamlet in Halton County (today Halton Region), Ontario, Canada, within the town of Oakville.

The hamlet was located around what is now the intersection of Dundas Street and Bronte Road. The settlement was established in 1805 by Lawrence Hagar, a settler to Upper Canada from Pennsylvania. The village was named Hagartown until 1836 when it was renamed to Palermo in honour of Horatio Nelson, Lord of Palermo.

In 1869, the population was 300. In 1875, the village had an iron foundry, two stores, and a hotel. At that time its population was 150. By the 1870s, the village also had a wagon shop, blacksmith shop, harness shop, brick school house, churches, a telegraph office and drill shed. The village, along with other villages in Trafalgar Township, became part of Oakville in 1962, when the township was amalgamated into Oakville.
