= Winston Churchill Boulevard =

Street in Ontario, Canada

Winston Churchill Boulevard Adamson Street
- Peel Regional Road 19; Halton Regional Road 19 (unsigned); Wellington County Road 25
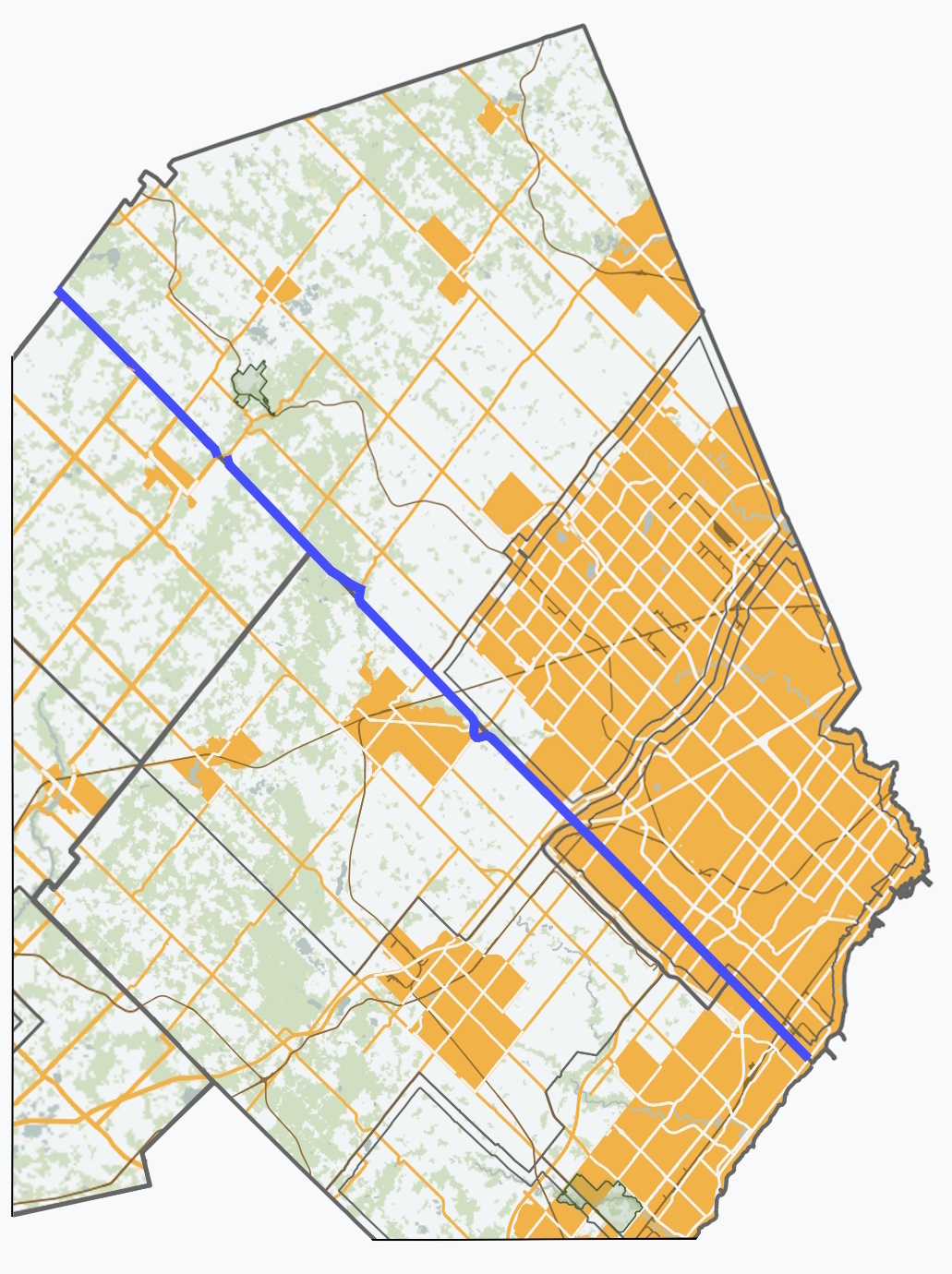
- Route of Winston Churchill Boulevard through Peel and Halton Regions, and Wellington County (blue line)
- Namesake: British Prime Minister Winston Churchill
- Maintained by: City of Mississauga; Region of Peel; Wellington County; Town of Caledon; Town of Erin; Township of East Garafraxa
- Length: 60 km (37 mi)
- Location: Mississauga; Brampton Oakville; Milton; Halton Hills; Caledon; Erin
- South end: Lakeshore Road
- Major junctions: Queen Elizabeth Way; Dundas Street; Burnhamthorpe Road; Highway 403; Eglinton Avenue; Britannia Road; Derry Road; Highway 401; Steeles Avenue; Highway 7 (Guelph Street); Mayfield Road / 17th Sideroad; King Street (Bush Street) / Wellington County Road 52; Charleston Sideroad / Wellington County Road 124
- North end: East Garafaxa-Caledon Townline

Other
Nearby arterial roads
← Ninth Line / Mountainview Road	Erin Mills Parkway / Mississauga Road →

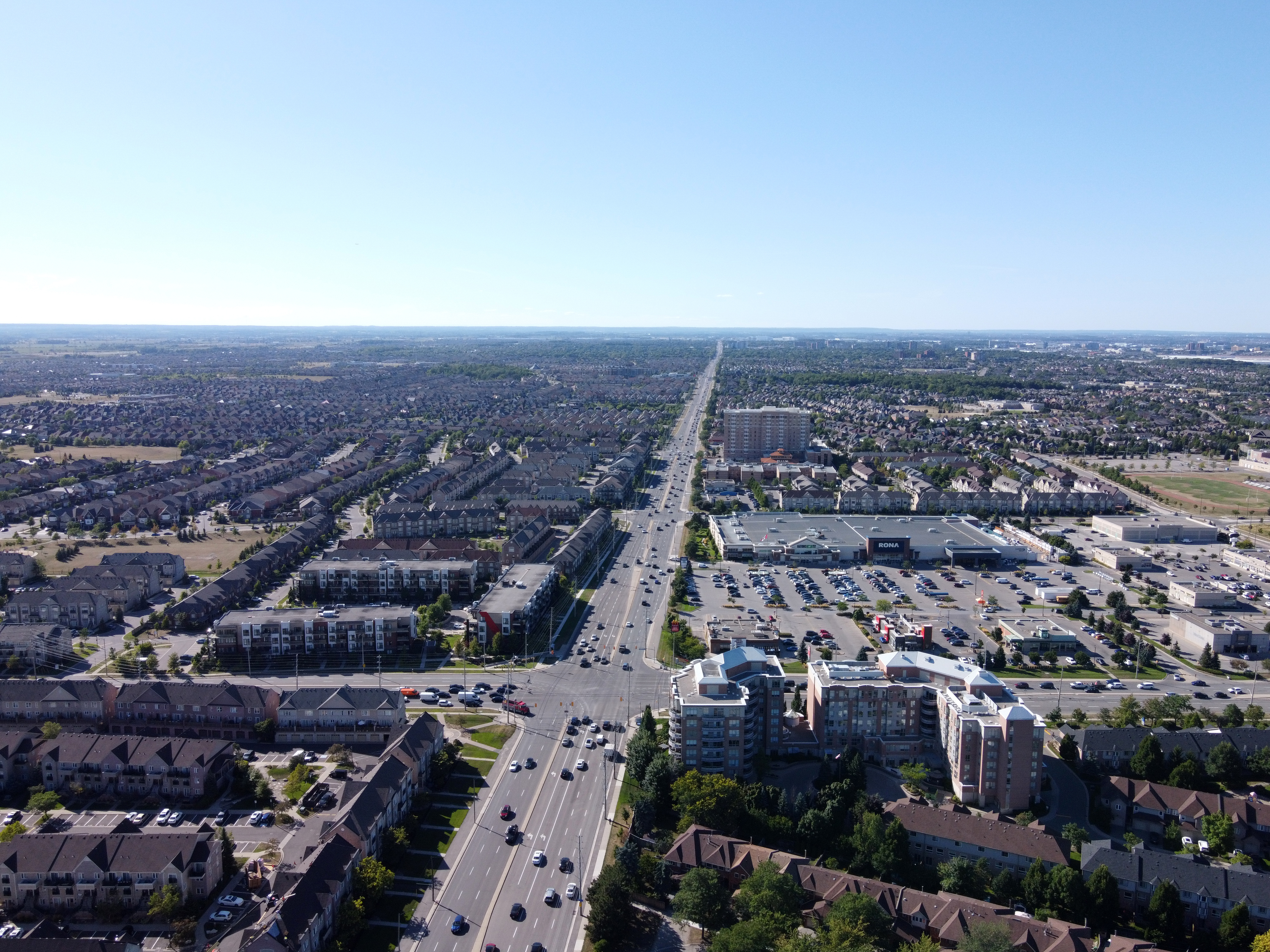
Aerial view of Winston Churchill Boulevard in Erin Mills, Mississauga

Winston Churchill Boulevard is a long north-south roadway that predominantly forms the western boundary of Peel Region with the eastern boundaries of Halton Region and part of Wellington County, in Ontario, Canada. The road begins at Lakeshore Road in the south at the boundaries of the City of Mississauga and the Town of Oakville, and ends at the Caledon-East Garafraxa boundary where it curves east to become a road named Caledon/East Garafraxa Townline at the Peel Region-Dufferin County line. The road is named in honour of British prime minister Winston Churchill.

The road is designated as Peel Regional Road 19 in the two segments where it forms Peel's boundary with the aforementioned divisions:

- In the south, between Lakeshore Road and Dundas Street.
- In the north, between Highway 401 at the boundary of Brampton and Halton Hills, and Wellington County Road 52 / Peel Regional Road 11 (Bush Street) at the Erin/Caledon boundary.

Halton Region shares jurisdiction with the Region of Peel over segments of the road along the Halton-Peel boundary between Highway 401 and Mayfield Road and designates it as Halton Regional Road 19, although only Peel Road 19 signs are posted. The town of Halton Hills shares jurisdiction with the Region of Peel over the segments along the Halton-Peel boundary between Mayfield Road and 32 Sideroad. Wellington County shares jurisdiction with the Region of Peel over the segment between 32 Sideroad and Beech Grove Sideroad, and designates it as Wellington County Road 25. The remaining northerly segment between Beech Grove Sideroad and East Garafaxa-Caledon Townline is unnumbered and under joint jurisdiction between the Towns of Caledon and Erin, and Township of East Garafraxa, where Winston Churchill forms the boundary between any two of these municipalities. The segment between Dundas Street and Highway 401 is entirely within Peel Region (the regional boundary shifts west to Highways 403 and 407 between them), and is under the jurisdiction of the City of Mississauga. Formerly, this section also formed the divisional boundary, but was changed due to municipal restructuring in 1974 resulting in transferring of the lands to the west to Mississauga.

In the community of Norval, Winston Churchill Boulevard deviates westward to be situated entirely within Halton Region and is locally named Adamson Street. Despite this, it is still signed exclusively as Peel Regional Road 19.

Within Terra Cotta, Winston Churchill deviates eastward to be situated entirely within the Town of Caledon in Peel, where it jogs along Peel Regional Road 9 (King Street) for approximately 550 metres. There is another short jog at Wellington Road 52 and Peel Road 11, where the designation changes from Peel Road 19 to Wellington Road 25.

== Public transit ==
In Mississauga, the road is served by MiWay routes 45 Winston Churchill (All Week) and 45A Winston Churchill (Peak only), both of which run from Clarkson GO Station to Meadowvale Town Centre. The Mississauga Transitway's western terminus, Winston Churchill Station is located just north of Highway 403. In Brampton, 511 Züm Steeles (a bus rapid transit route) serves a short section of the road en route to the Lisgar GO station in Mississauga.
