= List of numbered roads in Halton Region =

List of regional roads

This article lists all of the numbered regional roads in the Regional Municipality of Halton, Ontario, Canada.

Number	Names	Western/Southern Terminus	Eastern/Northern Terminus	Major Communities	Comments
	Guelph Line	Fairview Street	Eramosa-Milton Townline (boundary with Wellington County, Ontario, continues as Wellington County Road 44 - 4th Line Concession)	Burlington, Milton, Campbellville	Passes by the Mohawk Raceway
	Trafalgar Road	Cornwall Road	Intersection with Erin-Halton Hills Townline, Wellington CR 24, and Wellington County Road 42 (32nd Sideroad, boundary with Wellington County, continues as Wellington County Road 24).	Oakville, Hornby, Georgetown	Very busy road which serves as the primary north-south artery of Oakville, and connects Oakville with Georgetown via Halton Hills. Has a 4 km break northwest of Georgetown as Highway 7 is channelled along its baseline, and continues south of Speers Road to Lakeshore Road under the jurisdiction of the Town of Oakville.
	Neyagawa Boulevard, James Snow Parkway	Regional Road 38 (Upper Middle Road)	Roundabout intersection of Dublin Line/Tremaine Road/Campbellville Road/James Snow Parkway	Milton, Oakville	Currently short, but extensions are planned, and the northern extension is already under construction. Named for former provincial cabinet minister James Snow.
	Dundas Street	Evans Road (boundary with the City of Hamilton; continues as Hamilton City Road 5)	Winston Churchill Boulevard (boundary with the Regional Municipality of Peel; Dundas continues unnumbered into Mississauga)	Burlington, Oakville	Major artery in the southern part of Halton RM, quite busy at times.
	Britannia Road	Halton Regional Road 22 (Tremaine Road)	Highway 407 (exit 28) (boundary with Peel RM, continues as Peel Regional Road 3)	Milton	Originally Number 5 Sideroad until 1966.
	Derry Road	Milburough Line (boundary with the City of Hamilton)	Highway 407 (exit 31) (boundary with Peel RM, continues as Peel Regional Road 5)	Kilbride, Milton	Originally Number 10 Sideroad until 1966.
	Steeles Avenue	Halton Regional Road 22 (Tremaine Road)	Winston Churchill Boulevard (Halton RR 25/Peel Regional Road 19, boundary with Peel RM, continues as Peel Regional Road 15)	Milton	Brief concurrency with RR 25. Continuation of street from Peel and Toronto. Known as Upper Base Line until 1966.
	Campbellville Road	Milburough Line (boundary with City of Hamilton, continues as Hamilton CR 518)	Halton Regional Road 1 (Guelph Line)	Milton (Campbellville)	
	10th Sideroad	Halton Regional Road 3 (Trafalgar Road)	Halton RR 25/Peel RR 19	Georgetown, Norval	Passes along the southern edge of Georgetown before merging with RR25 on the west end of Norval.
	9th Line, Ford Drive	(Southern Section) Cornwall Road, (Northern Section) Highway 401	(Southern Section) Highway 407 and Highway 403 exchange passover (Milton/Oakville/Mississauga border), (Northern Section) Halton Regional Road 10 (10th Sideroad)	Oakville, Halton Hills	One of the main roads into Georgetown, discontinuous between Burnhamthorpe Road/William Halton Parkway (RR#40) and Highway 401, where Ninth Line is maintained by the City of Mississauga; has a jog at Steeles Ave. (RR#8)
	Dorval Drive	Speers Road	Halton Regional Road 38 (Upper Middle Road)	Oakville	
	Brant Street	Fairview Street	Halton Regional Road 5 (Dundas Street)	Burlington	Named for Joseph Brant.
	Winston Churchill Boulevard, Adamson Street, King Street	(Southern Section) Lakeshore Road in Oakville, (Northern Section) Highway 401 (exit 333)	(Southern Section) Dundas Street, (Northern Section) Intersection with Wellington CR 42 (Boundary with Wellington County, continues as Peel RR 19/Wellington CR 25)	Terra Cotta, Norval, Georgetown, Oakville	Shared regional road with Peel Region, but signed as Peel RR19 only. Named after Sir Winston Churchill, former British Prime Minister during the Second World War. Acts as the boundary between Peel RM and Halton RM. Discontinuous from Highway 401 to Dundas Street (RR 5), as the Region line moves west and the road is fully in Peel RM (Mississauga). Known as East Town Line until 1966.
	Appleby Line	Fairview Street	Halton Regional Road 7 (Derry Road)	Burlington	
	Burloak Drive	Wyecroft Road/Harvester Road	Halton Regional Road 38 (Upper Middle Road)	Oakville, Burlington	Burloak and Tremaine were formerly known as West Town Line before 1967.
	Tremaine Road	Halton Regional Road 5	Campbellville Road	Milton, Milton Heights	Intersection at Steeles being re-routed with traffic circle further west. Burloak and Tremaine were formerly known as West Town Line before 1967. Current Tremaine Road overpass will be re-located to the east with an interchange and to align with re-routing of road south of the 401 along with the closure of Peru Road north of the 3rd Side Road (and future re-alignment of Dublin Line north of 401).
	Milburough Line	Kilbride Street	Halton Regional Road 7 (Derry Road)	Kilbride	
	Bronte Road, Ontario Street, Steeles Avenue, Martin Street, Main Street	Speers Road	Erin-Halton Hills Townline (boundary with Wellington County, continues as Wellington County Road 125)	Burlington, Milton, Milton Heights, Acton	Formerly Highway 25. Has a brief concurrency with RR 8. Note: Peel Regional Road 19 is also signed as Halton RR 25 on maps from the Region boundary to Terra Cotta (roughly 5 km).
	Burnhamthorpe Road	Halton Regional Road 4 (Neyagawa Boulevard)	Sixth Line	Oakville	Continuation of street from Mississauga. It was previously called Back Concession Road in the former Halton County before 1967. Now mostly bypassed by RR40 (William Halton Parkway).
	Eramosa-Milton Townline	Halton Regional Road 1 (Guelph Line)	Highway 7		Boundary with Wellington County
	20th Sideroad	Concession 11 (boundary with Wellington County, continues as Wellington County Road 34)	Halton Regional Road 1 (Guelph Line)		Continuation of Wellington County Road 34
	Upper Middle Road	Guelph Line	Halton Regional Road 19/Peel Regional Road 19 (Winston Churchill Boulevard)	Burlington, Oakville	
	William Halton Parkway	Halton Regional Road 25 (Bronte Road)	Halton Regional Road 13 (Ninth Line)	Oakville	Partial bypass of RR 27 (Burnhamthorpe Road), with extension planned. Opened November 2020.
"Halton Region 45"	Wyecroft Road (West)	Burloak Drive	RioCan Burloak (planned extension to Bronte Road)	Burlington, Oakville (planned)	Construction on extension and bridge to Bronte Rd. started in 2019 and is planned to be completed in 2026.
