= Ontario Highway 25 =

Former Ontario provincial highway

King's Highway 25
- Highway 25 in 1997 Decommissioned section (1928–1946)

Route information
- Maintained by the Ministry of Transportation of Ontario
- Length: 98.1 km (61.0 mi)
- Existed: April 14, 1925–January 1, 1998

Major junctions
- South end: Queen Elizabeth Way in Burlington
- Highway 401 in Milton
- North end: Highway 89 near Shelburne

Location
- Country: Canada
- Province: Ontario
- Major cities: Simcoe, Paris, Brantford, Cambridge

Highway system
- Ontario provincial highways; Current; Former; 400-series
← Highway 24	→ Highway 26

King's Highway 25, commonly referred to as Highway 25, was a highway in the Canadian province of Ontario. The north–south route connected several towns on its route northward from Burlington. The first section of Highway 25, designated in 1925, travelled north from Highway 5 to Milton. In 1928, the route was extended south into Burlington, following portions of Lower Middle Road to Highway 2. The highway was extended north to Highway 7 in 1937. That same year, a portion of Highway 25 was made concurrent with The Middle Road, which would be renamed as the Queen Elizabeth Way (QEW) two years later. The route remained relatively unchanged for two decades, save for the southern end being truncated at the QEW in 1946. In 1963 it was extended north to Ospringe to meet Highway 24. Another extension was added in 1974 to bring the route to Highway 89 near Shelburne. The entire route was decommissioned in 1997 and 1998 as part of a province-wide downloading of highways deemed to be of regional importance.

== Route description ==
At the time of its decommissioning, Highway 25 began at an interchange with the QEW, at Exit 111; however, it originally continued south to Highway 2 (Lakeshore Road) at Bronte. It travelled along the eastern edge of Bronte Creek Provincial Park north to Highway 5 (Dundas Street) at Palermo, bearing the local name of Bronte Road. Today, the route encounters an interchange with Highway 407, Exit 13, just north of Dundas Street, though the toll highway wasn't yet built in the area at the time Highway 25 was decommissioned. The route continued north into Milton as Ontario Street, jogging westward for a short distance along Steeles Avenue before resuming a northward course along Martin Street.

Highway 25 then crossed over an interchange with Highway 401 (Exit 320). It passed through the rolling hillside of Halton Hills into the community of Acton, where it encountered Highway 7. The two highways travelled concurrently through Acton, after which Highway 7 branched westerly to Guelph. North of Acton, the highway crossed from the Regional Municipality of Halton into Wellington County and continued to Ospringe, meeting Highway 24 and becoming concurrent with it for the next 6.9 kilometres (4.3 mi) eastward to Brisbane.

At Brisbane, Highway 24 continued east while Highway 25 turned north to Highway 9, meeting it midway between Arthur and Orangeville. It then turned west concurrent with Highway 9 for 2.8 kilometres (1.7 mi) before turning north into Grand Valley. North of that town, it continued through rolling farmland before ending at Highway 89 west of Shelburne.

== History ==
The history of Highway 25 dates back to 1925 when the Department of Public Highways, predecessor to the Ministry of Transportation of Ontario (MTO), assumed control of the Halton County road between Palermo (since amalgamated into a neighbourhood of Oakville) and Milton on April 14, 1925. On August 22, 1928, the route was extended to Highway 2 (King Road) in Burlington via Guelph Line and the Lower Middle Road, the latter which would soon be incorporated into the QEW. This established a 10.5 km (6.5 mi) concurrency with Highway 5 between Nelson and Palermo. In 1937, Highway 25 was extended north to Highway 7 when the renamed Department of Highways (DHO) assumed the Milton to Acton Road. This short extension was established on August 25, 1937.

During the mid-1930s, construction of The Middle Road resulted in 4.1 km (2.5 mi) of the route being twinned, from King Road easterly. When the new divided highway opened in 1937, the Highway 25 designation was retained for a number of years. However, in 1946 the southern end of the highway was truncated at the QEW–Guelph Line interchange.

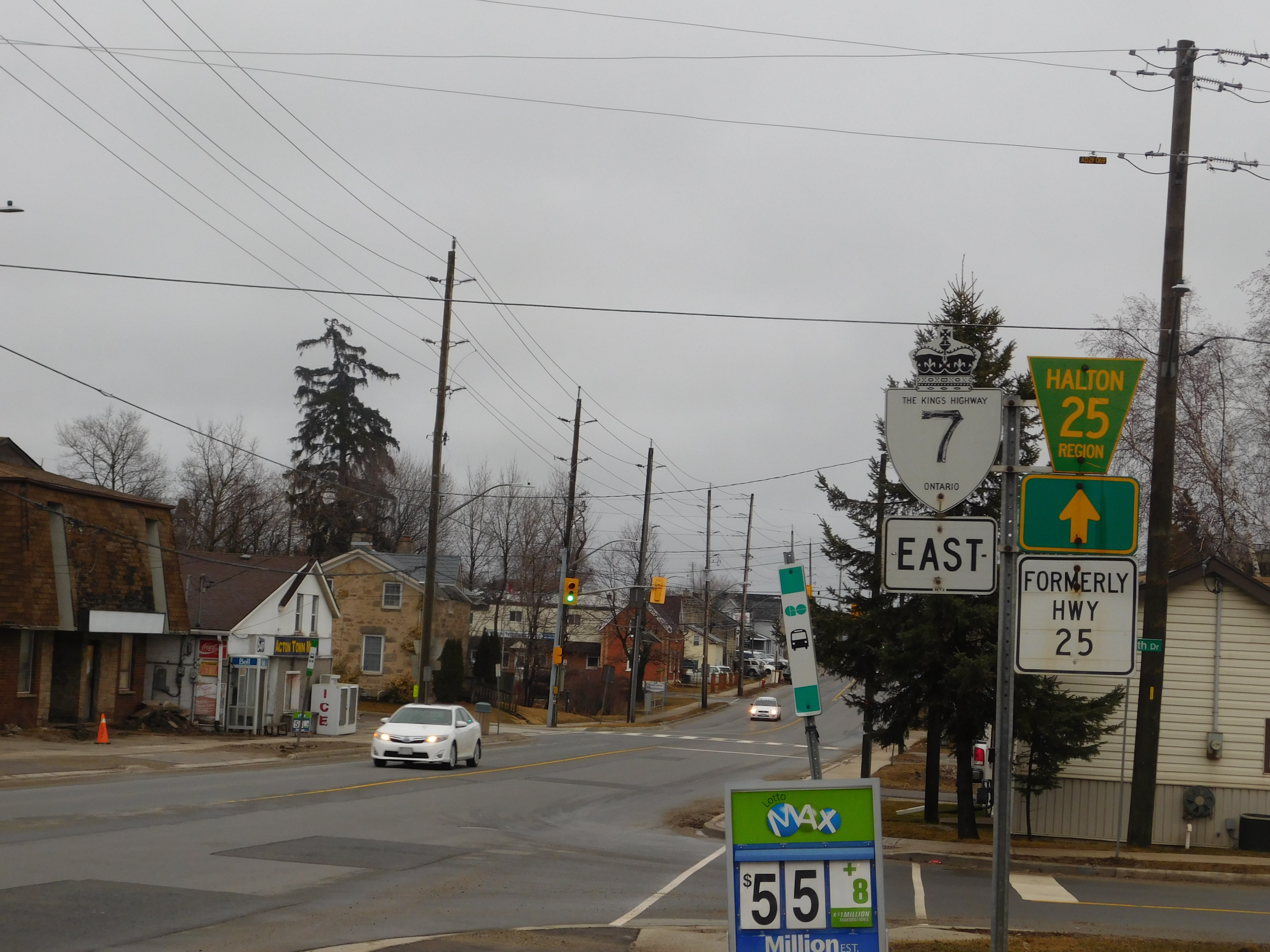
Signage on Halton 25 denoting its former designation

The route remained unchanged for nearly 20 years, until 1963. On April 25, the route was extended north by 10.0 km (6.2 mi) to Highway 24 in Ospringe. On April 1, 1970, the southern end of the highway was rerouted. The section along Guelph Line was decommissioned and the concurrency with Highway 5 was removed. A new direct routing south to the QEW along Bronte Road was established. During the spring of 1974, the route was extended 51.6 km (32.1 mi) north to Highway 89. A concurrency with Highway 24 was established east of Ospringe to Trafalgar Road, which the route followed north to Highway 9. The entire route of Highway 104 became part of Highway 25, and a concurrency with Highway 9 created.

Highway 25 was now 98.1 km (61.0 mi) long. However, provincial budget cuts under the Mike Harris government resulted in the removal of Highway 25 from the highway system during mass highway transfers performed in 1997 and 1998. On April 1, 1997, the section from the QEW to Highway 401 and the section north of Ospringe was decommissioned. This was followed several months later when the remainder of the highway was decommissioned on January 1, 1998.

== Major intersections ==
The following table lists the major junctions along Highway 25, as noted by the Ministry of Transportation of Ontario. The table lists the road as it existed in 1989, prior to being decommissioned.

Division	Location	km	mi	Destinations	Notes
Halton	Oakville	0.0	0.0	Queen Elizabeth Way – Hamilton, Toronto	
Halton	Oakville	4.0	2.5	Highway 5 (Dundas Street)	
Halton	Milton	11.4	7.1	Regional Road 6 (Britannia Road)	
Halton	Milton	14.5	9.0	Regional Road 7 (Derry Road)	
Halton	Milton	16.6	10.3	Regional Road 36 (Main Street)	
Halton	Milton	17.6– 18.3	10.9– 11.4	Regional Road 8 (Steeles Avenue)	Highway 25 follows Steeles Avenue between Ontario and Martin Streets
Halton	Milton	19.5	12.1	Highway 401 – London, Toronto	Exit 320
Halton	Halton Hills	28.0	17.4	15th Sideroad	
Halton	Halton Hills	32.2	20.0	22nd Sideroad	
Halton	Halton Hills	34.1	21.2	25th Sideroad	
Halton	Acton	35.9	22.3	Highway 7 east (Mill Street East) – Brampton	Locally known as Main Street
Halton	Acton	36.5	22.7	Highway 7 west (Guelph Street West) – Guelph	Locally known as Main Street
Wellington	Erin	41.8	26.0	County Road 50 (Sideroad 5)	
Wellington	Erin	46.5	28.9	Highway 24 south	Ospringe; beginning of concurrency with Highway 24
Wellington	Erin	53.4	33.2	Highway 24 north	Brisbane; end of concurrency with Highway 24
Wellington	Erin	59.5	37.0	County Road 22	Hillsburgh
Dufferin	East Garafraxa	68.5	42.6	County Road 3 (Orangeville–Fergus Road)	Reading
Dufferin	East Garafraxa	75.6	47.0	Highway 9 east – Orangeville	Beginning of Highway 9 concurrency
Dufferin	East Garafraxa	78.4	48.7	Highway 9 west – Arthur	End of Highway 9 concurrency
Dufferin	Grand Valley	80.5	50.0	Emma Street	
Dufferin	East Luther-Grand Valley	83.9	52.1	County Road 10 east (10th Sideroad)	
Dufferin	East Luther-Grand Valley	92.7	57.6	County Road 15 west	
Dufferin	East Luther-Grand Valley	98.1	61.0	Highway 89 – Mount Forest, Shelburne	
1.000 mi = 1.609 km; 1.000 km = 0.621 mi
