= Garafraxa =

Garafraxa may refer to:

- East Garafraxa, a township in Dufferin County, Ontario, Canada
- West Garafraxa, part of the township of Centre Wellington in Wellington County, Ontario, Canada
