= Lakeshore Road =

Road in Ontario, Canada

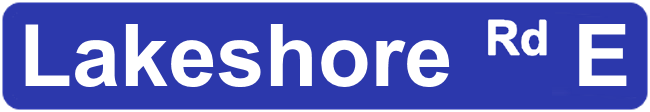

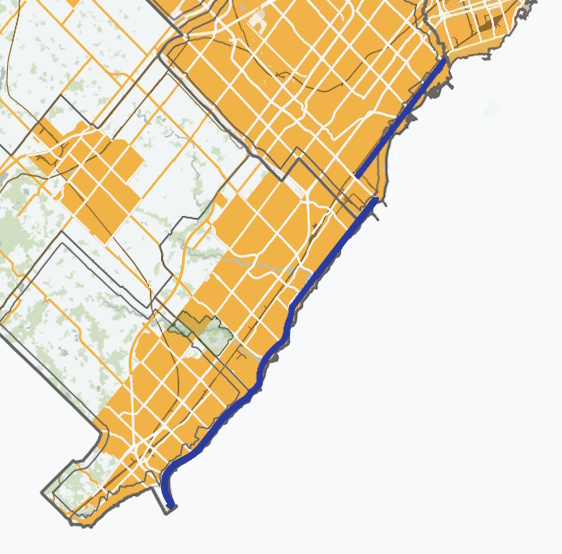
- Lakeshore Road through Mississauga and Halton Region (blue line)
- Maintained by: City of Burlington; Town of Oakville; City of Mississauga
- Length: 38.5 km (23.9 mi)
- Location: Burlington, Mississauga, Oakville
- West end: Queen Elizabeth Way / Eastport Drive in Burlington
- Major junctions: North Shore Boulevard/Maple Avenue; Brant Street; Guelph Line; Walkers Line; Appleby Line; Great Lakes Boulevard; Bronte Road; Dorval Drive; Trafalgar Road; Ford Drive; Winston Churchill Boulevard; Southdown Road; Hurontario Street; Cawthra Road; Dixie Road
- East end: Mississauga–Toronto boundary (continues as Lake Shore Boulevard)

Other
Nearby arterial roads
Queen Elizabeth Way →

Lakeshore Road (originally Lake Shore Road) is a historic roadway in the Canadian province of Ontario, running through the city of Burlington and the town of Oakville in Halton Region, as well as the city of Mississauga in Peel Region. As its name implies, the road closely follows the shoreline of Lake Ontario, although the lake itself is not visible from the road in most areas. Lakeshore Road was once a key section of the historic Highway 2 (as well as a short section of Highway 20), which traversed the province, but has since been downloaded to local municipalities. Despite this historical role as a major route, however, most of the road is a lower-capacity picturesque residential and historic commercial street with only two through lanes until it becomes a four-lane, higher-volume artery after it enters Mississauga and jogs to the north.

Lakeshore Road historically continued east into Toronto, as far east as the Parkdale neighbourhood, where it tied into Queen Street, but that section was later redesignated as Lake Shore Boulevard as it was gradually extended into the city's downtown during the first half of the 20th century.

== Route description ==
Lakeshore Road begins in Burlington beside the Burlington Bay James N. Allan Skyway (which carries the Queen Elizabeth Way over the canal cut across the sandbar separating Hamilton Harbour from the main body of Lake Ontario) where Eastport Drive continues an offramp from the QEW. The road formerly interlined with Beach Boulevard in Hamilton via the Burlington Canal Lift Bridge (and was formerly a part of Highway 20 through this stretch), but the construction of Eastport Drive in 1982 resulted in that link being severed as the new road was routed over the bridge. Lakeshore proceeds along Burlington Beach as a three-lane road (the third being a centre turning lane), passing the Joseph Brant Hospital. It comes to the intersection of North Shore Boulevard, where it turns right, the former Highway 2 came in from the west to follow its course eastwards, and where Highway 20 terminated.

The road continues east along the downtown Burlington waterfront and passes the Brant Street Pier. East of downtown, Lakeshore enters a long, predominantly wealthy, leafy residential stretch consisting of a mix of lakefront mansions, parklands, and a few apartment buildings, a setting which characterizes the road through most of Halton Region. Upon entering Oakville, the street passes through an area of newer residential developments that were built on the site of a closed oil refinery; the Shell Oakville Refinery. Shortly thereafter, Lakeshore crosses the Bronte Creek and enters the once-independent historic Bronte Village. After passing through more residential areas, it travels through Kerr Village, crosses the Sixteen Mile Creek and comes into downtown Oakville. Further east, the road continues on through the Eastlake neighbourhood before leaving Oakville at Winston Churchill Boulevard.

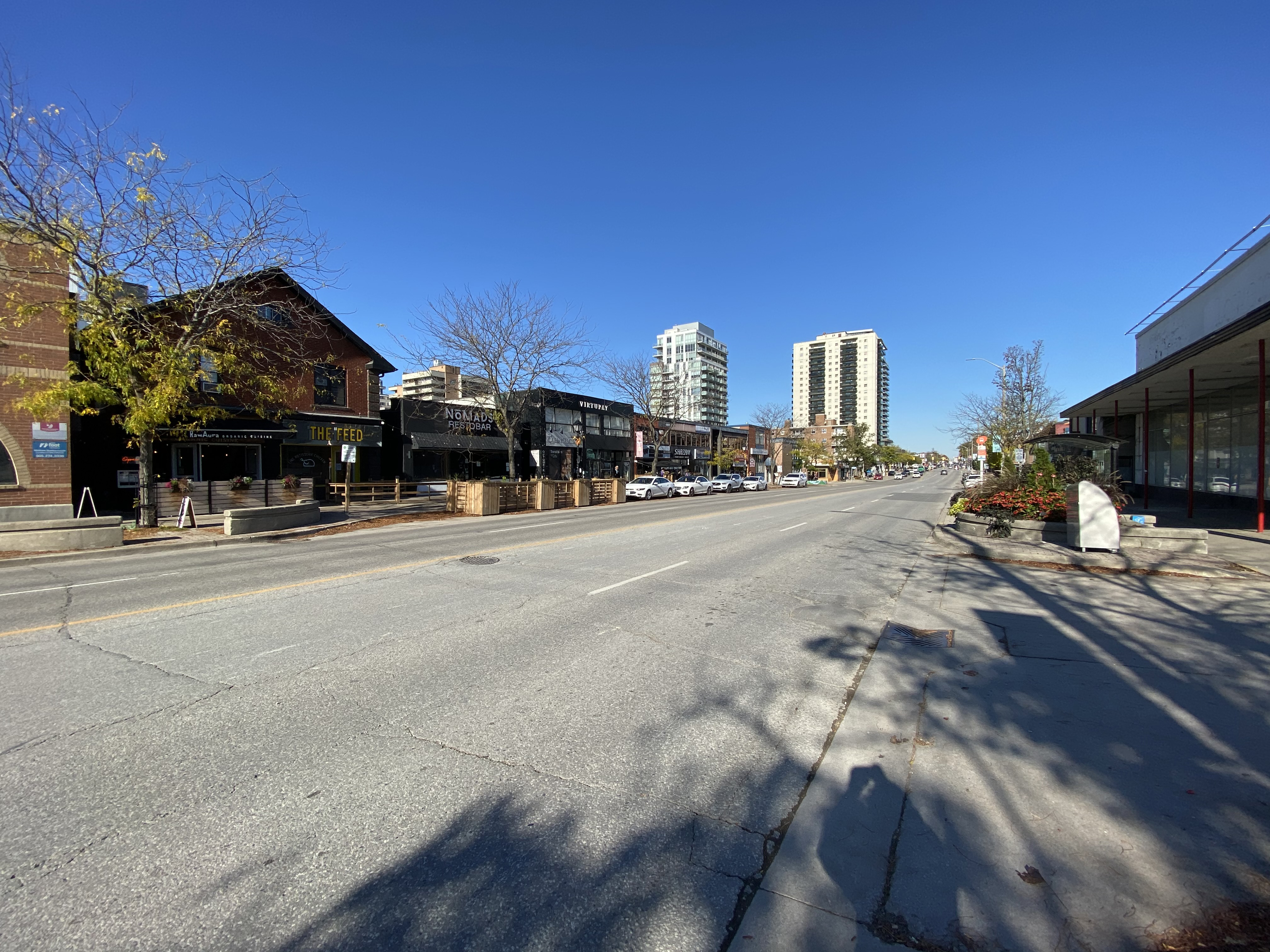
Lakeshore Road in Port Credit, Mississauga

The residential surroundings end abruptly as Lakeshore enters Mississauga (and Peel Region), coming into a semi-rural industrial zone which contains a cement plant and another oil refinery; the Mississauga Lubricants Centre, among other industries. At the refinery, the road bends sharply to the left and turns into Southdown Road, along which it jogs north for 2 kilometres (1.2 mi) until reaching Royal Windsor Drive in Clarkson Village, where it turns right, widens to four lanes, and returns to attractive surroundings once again. East of Clarkson, it passes through Lorne Park, originally a cottage resort community, and Jack Darling Park. Lakeshore then enters another historic district, Port Credit, crosses the Credit River, and intersects Hurontario Street (formerly Highway 10), which is Mississauga's main street and a historic route to Collingwood. Beyond Port Credit, the street traverses older and more typical mixed residential and commercial suburban areas through Lakeview, where the Lakeview Generating Station, a coal-fired power plant decommissioned in 2005, was located. Lakeshore ends at Mississauga's eastern boundary at the Etobicoke Creek beside Marie Curtis Park, where it continues as Toronto's Lake Shore Boulevard.

== History ==
=== Establishment of the route ===
Lakeshore Road originated as a Native trail running along the shore of Lake Ontario east from the vicinity of present-day downtown Burlington as far as today's Fourth Line in Oakville. Later, in the colonial era, after the concession road system was laid out, it was improved and linked to continue east along the Third Concession South of Dundas Street, in the historic Nelson, Trafalgar, and Toronto townships; and the First Concession in Etobicoke Township. The sections in the old village cores of Burlington, Bronte, and Oakville, were named Water Street, Triller Street, and Colborne Street, respectively.

=== Street railways on Lakeshore ===
An interurban radial line operated by the Toronto and Mimico Electric Railway and Light Company ran along (then) "Lake Shore" Road beginning in 1892, running west as a short stub from Parkdale in Toronto to the Humber River. The line was extended to Mimico on July 10, 1893 and reached Long Branch on July 1, 1895. It arrived in Port Credit, first to Hurontario Street on December 24, 1905, and then to the Credit River, on November 19 of the following year.

The line was proposed to be extended to Oakville to meet up with the Hamilton Radial Electric Railway interurban line running from Hamilton; on the south side of Randall Street, Rebecca Street, and New Street, to the Oakville Station at Thomas Street, although the connection was never constructed due to financial difficulties.

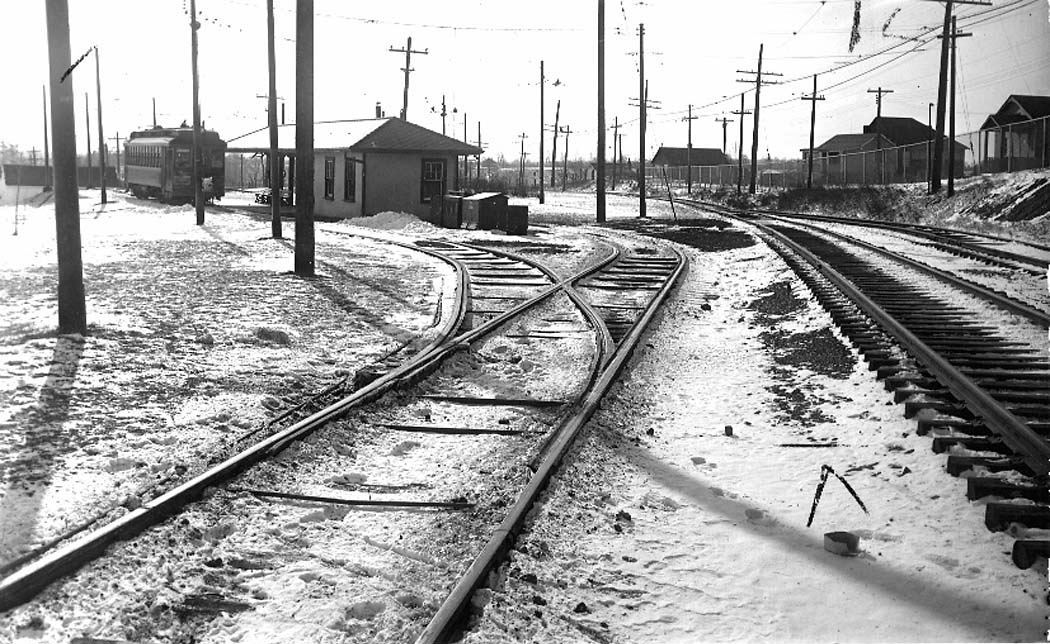
Long Branch Loop in 1935, showing the last radial car to go west to Port Credit

The line was taken over by the Toronto Transportation Commission on December 1, 1920, and in 1928 the portion from Mimico to Long Branch was converted to a double-track urban streetcar line which still carries cars along Lake Shore Blvd. in Toronto to the present day (routes 501 Queen, 507 Long Branch, 508 Lake Shore, and the overnight 301 Queen). The remainder of the route west to Port Credit was abandoned in 1935, due to competition from automobiles and intercity bus service. The Hamilton Radial Electric Railway's radial line shut down completely in 1929.

But street railways would return to Lake Shore Road west of Toronto, albeit only temporarily: During World War II. the TTC extended its Long Branch line tracks a short distance into Toronto Township (now Mississauga) and ran city streetcars to serve an armaments factory from October 1942 until October 1945, but removed them shortly after the end of the war.

=== Upgrading to highway status ===
Lake Shore Road was macadamized during the 19th century, although it was frequently damaged by erosion. With the advent of automobile use in the early 20th century, it was chosen as the route of the proposed Toronto–Hamilton Highway in 1914 as part of the Provincial Highway (Highway 2). The Toronto-to-Hamilton highway which, when completed in 1917, was both Ontario's first concrete highway and one of the longest such inter-city stretches in the world.

Over the next decade, vehicle usage increased substantially, and by 1920 Lake Shore Road was again congested, particularly during weekends. In response, the Department of Highways examined improving another road between Toronto and Hamilton. The road was to be more than twice the width of Lake Shore Road at 12 m (39 ft) and would carry two lanes of traffic in either direction. The new highway was named The Middle Road, which later became the Queen Elizabeth Way. As a result of the new highway, Lake Shore was relieved of its heavy traffic, and was able to retain its narrow width for most of its length, which it still has today.

At about the same time, Lake Shore Rd. was extended east towards Exhibition Place, and in the 1950s, all the way into downtown Toronto and beyond. The portion in what became Metropolitan Toronto was rechristened as Lake Shore Boulevard during this time period, officially truncating it to the Etobicoke Creek at what is today's Mississauga-Toronto city limits.
