= Andreas Laupacis =

Canadian physician, health services researcher and palliative care specialist

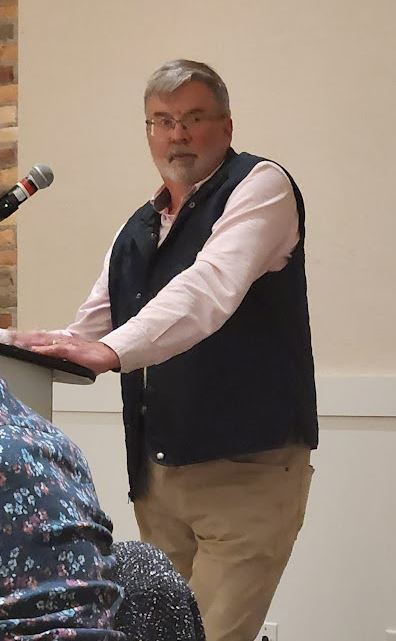
- Andreas Laupacis in 2022
- Born: Arthur, Ontario, Canada
- Education: Queen's University, McMaster University
- Known for: leadership in evidence‐based medicine and health policy; inaugural President and CEO of the Institute for Clinical Evaluative Sciences; directing the Li Ka Shing Knowledge Institute
- Awards: Officer of the Order of Canada
- Scientific career
- Fields: Medicine, Health services research, Palliative care, Clinical epidemiology, Health policy
- Workplaces: St. Michael’s Hospital (Toronto), University of Toronto, Li Ka Shing Knowledge Institute, Institute for Clinical Evaluative Sciences, Loeb Health Research Institute

Andreas Laupacis OC is a Canadian physician, researcher, and administrator specializing in health services research, palliative care, and health policy. He is recognized for his contributions to evidence‐based medicine and for fostering public engagement in health care. He was the executive director of the Li Ka Shing Knowledge Institute at St. Michael’s Hospital in Toronto, where he also directed the Keenan Research Centre — a hub for innovative research in clinical epidemiology and health policy. He is a professor in the Department of Medicine and the Institute of Health Policy, Management and Evaluation at the University of Toronto. He was CEO of the Institute for Clinical Evaluative Sciences (IC/ES) and directing the Clinical Epidemiology Unit at the Loeb Health Research Institute at Ottawa Civic Hospital.

== Early life and education ==
Laupacis was born in Arthur, Ontario. He earned his MD and BA from Queen's University and completed a Master of Science in design, measurement and evaluation at McMaster University.

== Career ==
Beginning his career as a general internist, Dr. Laupacis rapidly emerged as a leader in clinical research and health services evaluation. His extensive body of academic work is thematic around methodologies in clinical epidemiology, health technology assessment, and evidence‐based policy.

Laupacis was instrumental in shaping health services research in Canada. Laupacis founded the Clinical Epidemiology Unit at the Loeb Health Research Institute at Ottawa Civic Hospital, where his contributions have advanced methods for evaluating clinical interventions and outcomes. He then was the CEO of the Institute for Clinical Evaluative Sciences (IC/ES) from 2001 to 2006, a role in which he championed the rigorous evaluation of health care practices and policies.

At St. Michael’s Hospital, Laupacis founded and has directed the Li Ka Shing Knowledge Institute, a premier centre for health research and education. In this capacity, he also established the Keenan Research Centre, which supports cutting-edge research in clinical epidemiology and health policy. He also held a Canada Research Chair in Health Policy and Citizen Engagement.

=== Editorial and Public Engagement Roles ===
Laupacis is the founding Editor-in-Chief of Healthy Debate, an online forum designed to engage the public in discussions about health care policy and reform. He also serves as the Editor-in-Chief of the Canadian Medical Association Journal.

== Awards and recognition ==
Laupacis' work has garnered numerous accolades. In November 2022, he was appointed an Officer of the Order of Canada in recognition of his outstanding contributions to medicine and health policy. He has also been honoured as the Justice Emmett Hall Laureate and has received the Health Services Research Advancement Award as well as the Jill M. Sanders Award of Excellence in Health Technology Assessment.

== Personal life ==
Laupacis is married with two children.
