= Burnhamthorpe Road =

Road in the Greater Toronto Area in Ontario, Canada

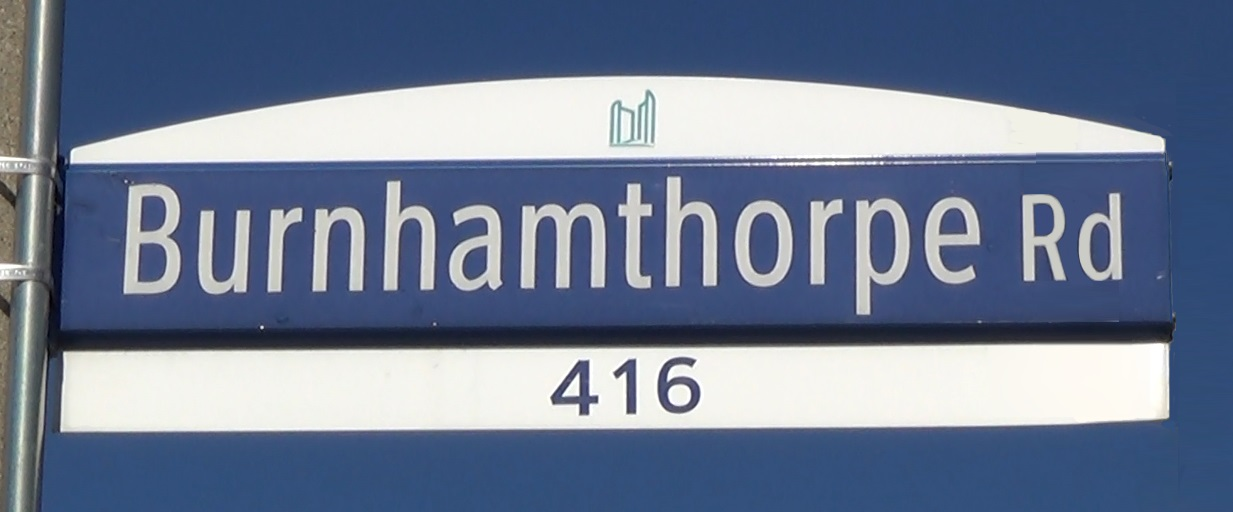
- Halton Regional Road 27
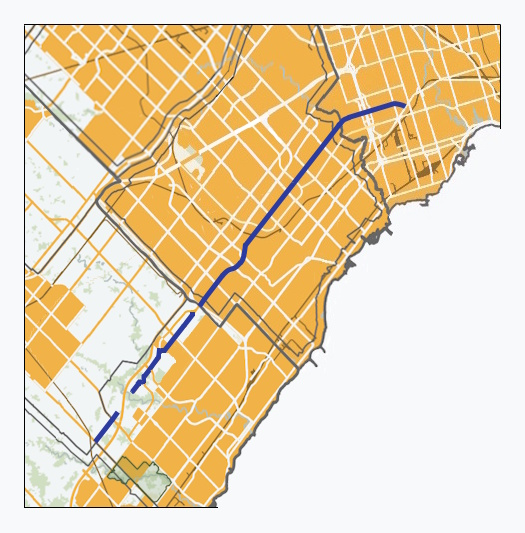
- Route of Burnhamthorpe Road through Toronto, Mississauga, and Oakville (blue line)
- Maintained by: City of Toronto; City of Mississauga; Region of Halton; Town of Oakville
- West end: Tremaine Road (Continues west as No. 1 Side Road)
- Major junctions: Bronte Road; Neyagawa Boulevard; William Halton Parkway (1); Trafalgar Road; William Halton Parkway (2) —Subsumed by W.H. Pkwy.— Ninth Line; Winston Churchill Boulevard; Erin Mills Parkway; Mavis Road; Hurontario Street; Cawthra Road; Dixie Road; Highway 427; Kipling Avenue
- East end: Dundas Street

Other
Nearby arterial roads
← Lower Baseline; Eglinton Avenue	Dundas Street; Bloor Street →

Burnhamthorpe Road is a major arterial road in the cities of Toronto and Mississauga, Ontario; beginning at Dundas Street (from which it initially angles away from before running parallel with), near Islington Avenue, running west and becoming a rural road in the Town of Oakville, where it terminates (after breaking) at Tremaine Road, where it changes name.

Unlike most major streets originating in Toronto and continuing into the "905" suburbs, only a short portion is located in Toronto and the street is strongly Mississauga-centric. Also, although Burnhamthorpe is commonly seen as the latter city's main east–west street, the parallel arteries of Dundas Street and Eglinton Avenue are (with the notable exception of the City Centre area) busier and have heavier commercial uses along them overall.

The north side of the right-of-way on the street's eastern half through Mississauga is unusually wide as the result of being reserved for either a light rail transit line, and later as a potential route segment of the proposed GO-ALRT network, neither of which were built. The reserve was converted into a bicycle trail, with another transit facility (the Mississauga Transitway) being constructed along the Highway 403 corridor farther north instead.

In Mississauga, the street, unlike most other arterial roads in the regional municipalities surrounding Toronto proper, is not a regional road. However, in Oakville it is signed as Halton Regional Road 27 as far west as Neyagawa Boulevard.

== History ==
Burnhamthorpe Road was originally laid out in 1806 as the first concession road north of Dundas Street in Toronto Township (now Mississauga). It is named after a former hamlet in Mississauga, which in turn was named by settler John Abelson for his hometown of Burnham Thorpe, England. In Toronto, the road was a tolled plank road built in the 1840s running west from the former Village of Islington though Etobicoke Township and was referred to as Mono Sixth Line Road. It was informally also as the Back Line, Adamson Sideroad, and Rogers Road in Toronto Township west of the Credit River, and Back Concession Road in Halton County (present Region) until 1966. The "Back" in these earlier names referred to the practice of backing 200-acre (81 hectare) rectangular farm lots onto the road, while having their access fronting onto the adjacent Dundas Street and what is today Eglinton Avenue.

The street was broken by the Credit River until the 1980s, when it was made continuous thanks to the construction of a high-level twin bridge across the river's deep and wide valley. Further west, to facilitate the crossing of the smaller Mullet Creek ravine by a new alignment, the street deviated southward from its original course, parts of which make up three residential streets; Fifeshire Court, Burbank Road, and Rogers Road (the latter being a historic name) today.

In November 2020, a new arterial road bypass of Burnhamthorpe, named William Halton Parkway (Halton Regional Road 40), was opened through Oakville, subsuming a brief section of it west of Ninth Line.

== Route description ==
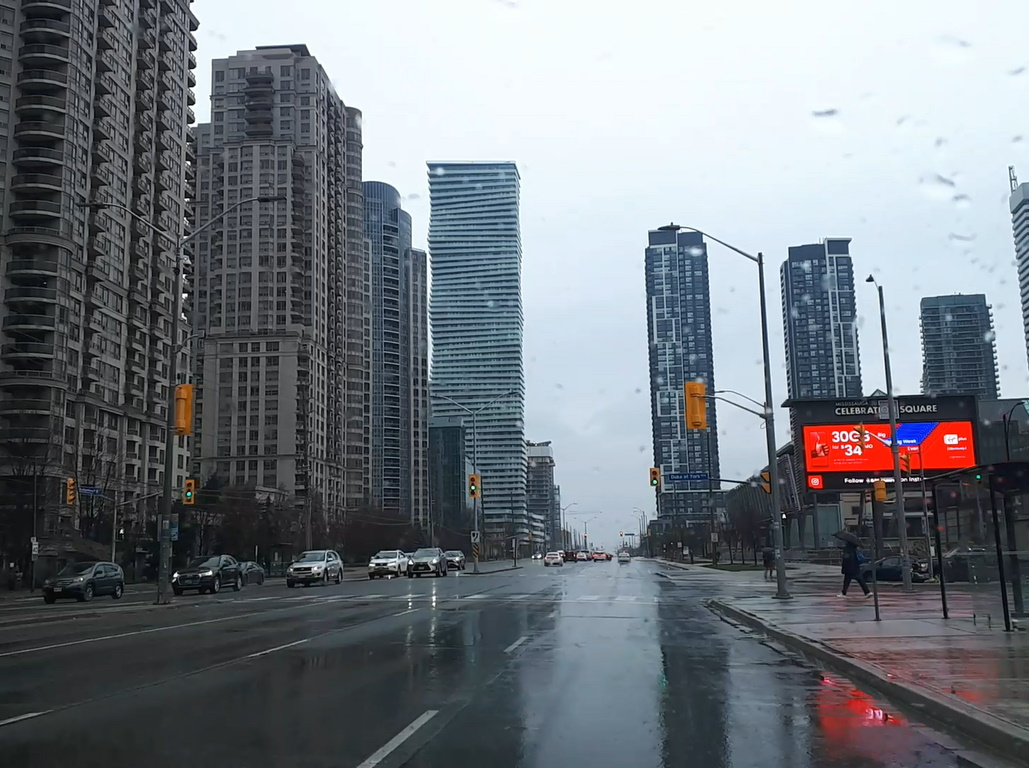
Burnhamthorpe Road in Mississauga City Centre on a rainy day

Burnhamthorpe begins at Dundas Street in the Islington neighborhood in Toronto's west end and heads west, interchanging with Highway 427. At Renforth Creek there road was re-routed resulting in a stub to the north that runs as Old Burnhamthrope Road.

After crossing the Etobicoke Creek, it enters Mississauga and is designated Burnhamthorpe Road East. At Hurontario Street, it passes by the iconic Absolute World condominium towers, enters Mississauga City Centre, and changes to a West designation. A linear park, lined with residential towers, runs along the south side of the street through here. Landmarks located in the City Centre on or near Burnhamthorpe include Square One Shopping Centre; the Living Arts Centre; and Mississauga Celebration Square; with the Mississauga Civic Centre situated just to the north. Continuing west past the city centre area, it traverses a mixed commercial and residential zone, before crossing over the wide Credit River valley on a high-level bridge, and entering the leafy Erin Mills district. Just west of Winston Churchill Boulevard, it narrows to two lanes and crosses over (but has no interchange with) Highway 403, just south of the latter's interchange with Highway 407.

At Ninth Line, it enters still-predominantly rural northern Oakville, and is briefly subsumed by William Halton Parkway, a new road which is still under construction (in phases) and mostly bypasses Burnhamthorpe through Oakville, but turns off 600 metres (0.4 mile) to the west where William Halton curves northwards. At Sixth Line, the road enters an area where the first development along it through the town is underway (as of 2020). West of Sixth Line it rejoins William Halton Parkway as the latter roads swings in from the northeast, widening to four lanes as it defaults into and becomes Burnhamthorpe West of that point, although project documentation suggests this section of Burnhamthorpe Road may be renamed William Halton Parkway after the project is completed. After another, 4 km (2.5 miles), it breaks at Highway 407-ETR and the Sixteen Mile Creek. It resumes briefly west of the creek, and terminates at Tremaine Road. Its course is continued west by the Number 1 Side Road.

== Public transit ==
Toronto Transit Commission (TTC)

Within the City of Toronto, TTC Route 50 Burnhamthorpe serves the street from Islington subway station to Mill Road.

MiWay

In Mississauga, MiWay Route 26 Burnhamthorpe operates from the South Common Centre (located just west of Erin Mills Parkway), to Islington station in Toronto, serving the Mississauga City Centre Transit Terminal and Kipling Bus Terminal at Kipling station en route. It operates with a "closed-door" policy within Toronto, with westbound-only (to Mississauga) pick-up, and eastbound-only (from Mississauga) drop-off, with the exception of transfers between connecting Miway buses as part of a continuous trip.

=== Mississauga bus routing controversy ===
Burnhamthorpe Road was a relatively minor artery through Etobicoke, which was a separate city within the then-Metropolitan Toronto, until traffic increased due to the growth of Mississauga in the 1970s and 80's. Much of this new traffic consisted of a growing number of city buses operated by MiWay (then known as Mississauga Transit) traveling to and from the Toronto Transit Commission's Islington subway station. Etobicoke residents saw increasing congestion on Burnhamthorpe Road without any benefit to themselves, since these MiWay buses could not pick up passengers in Etobicoke.

These added MiWay buses were attributed to Mississauga not investing heavily in public transit infrastructure, instead relying upon existing connections to the TTC. Hazel McCallion, then-mayor of Mississauga, rejected extending the Bloor–Danforth subway line to Square One. A proposed regional transit centre at Kipling station had not yet materialized due to disagreements over cost-sharing between Mississauga, Metro Toronto (soon replaced by the newly amalgamated City of Toronto), and the province of Ontario.

By the late 1990s, the number of MiWay buses had gotten so high that Etobicoke residents on Burnhamthorpe Road begun complaining and leading to intervention by municipal politicians, in what became known as the Battle of the Buses. Etobicoke residents occasionally blockaded buses, and demanded that the MiWay buses use Highway 427 and Dundas Street (which has HOV lanes) to reach Islington station, however MiWay rejected this routing which would have added $500,000 in operating costs. A temporary compromise was struck between TTC chief general manager Rick Ducharme and Mississauga Transportation Commissioner Angus McDonald which would have seen MiWay reduce the number of Burnhamthorpe Road buses from 308 to 266. However this deal was rejected by TTC commissioners, who also voted to ban MiWay buses from using the bus bays at the subway station in 1998 until it was lifted in 2001.

In 2021, the long-delayed regional bus terminal at Kipling station opened, and all MiWay buses were re-routed to terminate there and no longer travel on Burnhamthorpe Road east of Highway 427, with the exception of 26 Burnhamthorpe itself.
