= Brucedale, Ontario =

Brucedale
- Unincorporated rural community
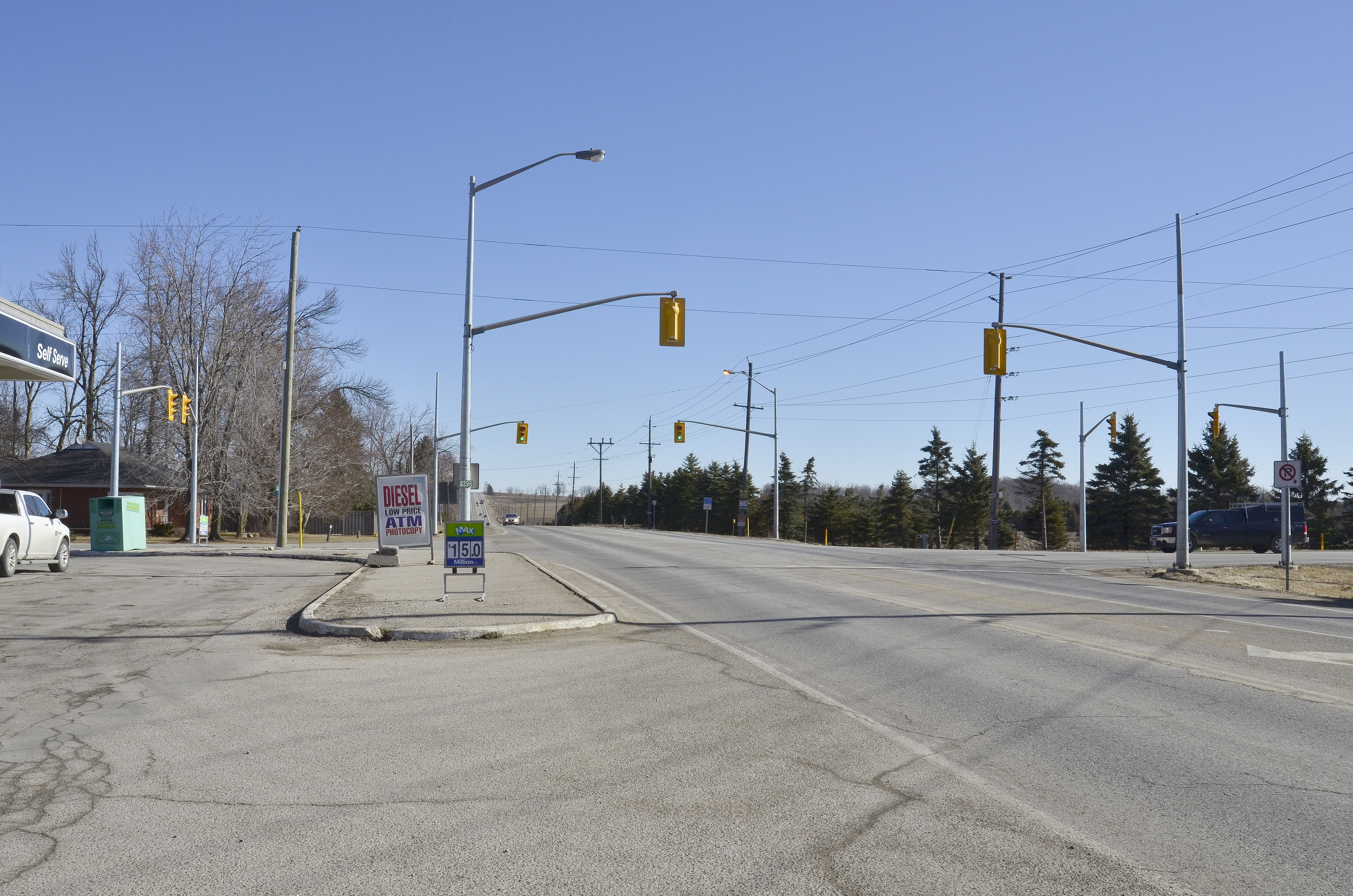
- Looking northeast on Highway 124 in Brucedale

- Location of Brucedale in Canada Brucedale (Ontario)
- Coordinates: 43°38′52″N 80°11′11″W
- Country: Canada
- Province: Ontario
- County: Wellington
- Township: Guelph/Eramosa
- Time zone: UTC-5 (Eastern (EST))
  - Summer (DST): UTC-4 (EDT)
- GNBC Code: FAMDO

Brucedale is an unincorporated rural community in Guelph/Eramosa Township, Wellington County, Ontario, Canada.

The Guelph/Eramosa municipal office is located at the southwest boundary of Brucedale.

== History ==
In 1907, a school was built on the Eramosa Gravel Road (later Ontario Highway 24, now County Road 124) on the south side of lot 14, concession 4, to serve School Section No. 10. The school burned down in 1934, and was rebuilt that same year. When the new Eramosa Public School opened farther up Fifth Line in 1965, the building was converted to Township offices. The building was left vacant after the construction of a new municipal building for Eramosa Township next door, and was torn down in 2005.

== Geography ==
The highest point in Guelph/Eramosa Township, at about 420 m (1,380 ft) above sea level, is located on a ridge north of Brucedale.
