= Arthur, Ontario =

Arthur
- Unincorporated community
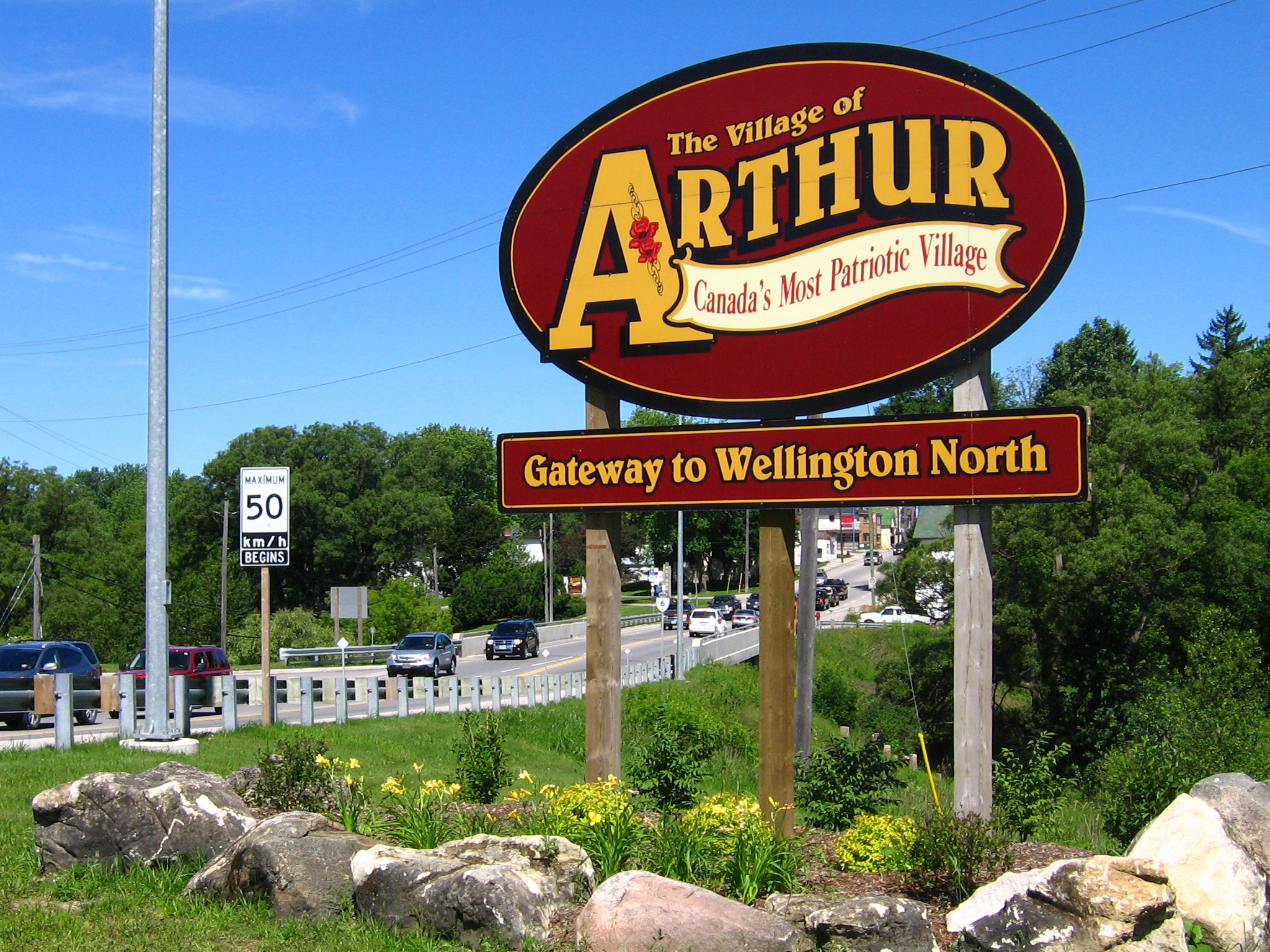
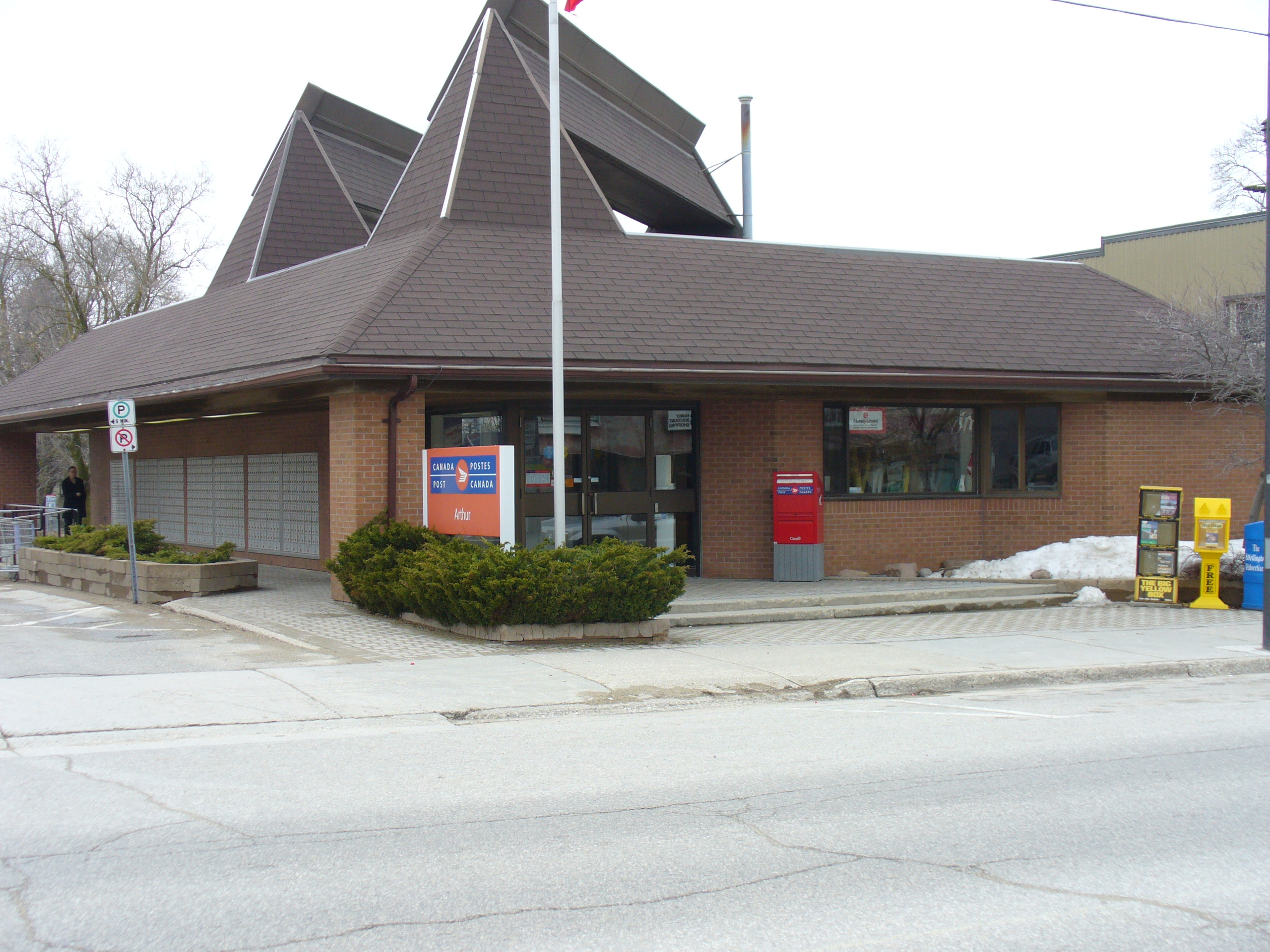
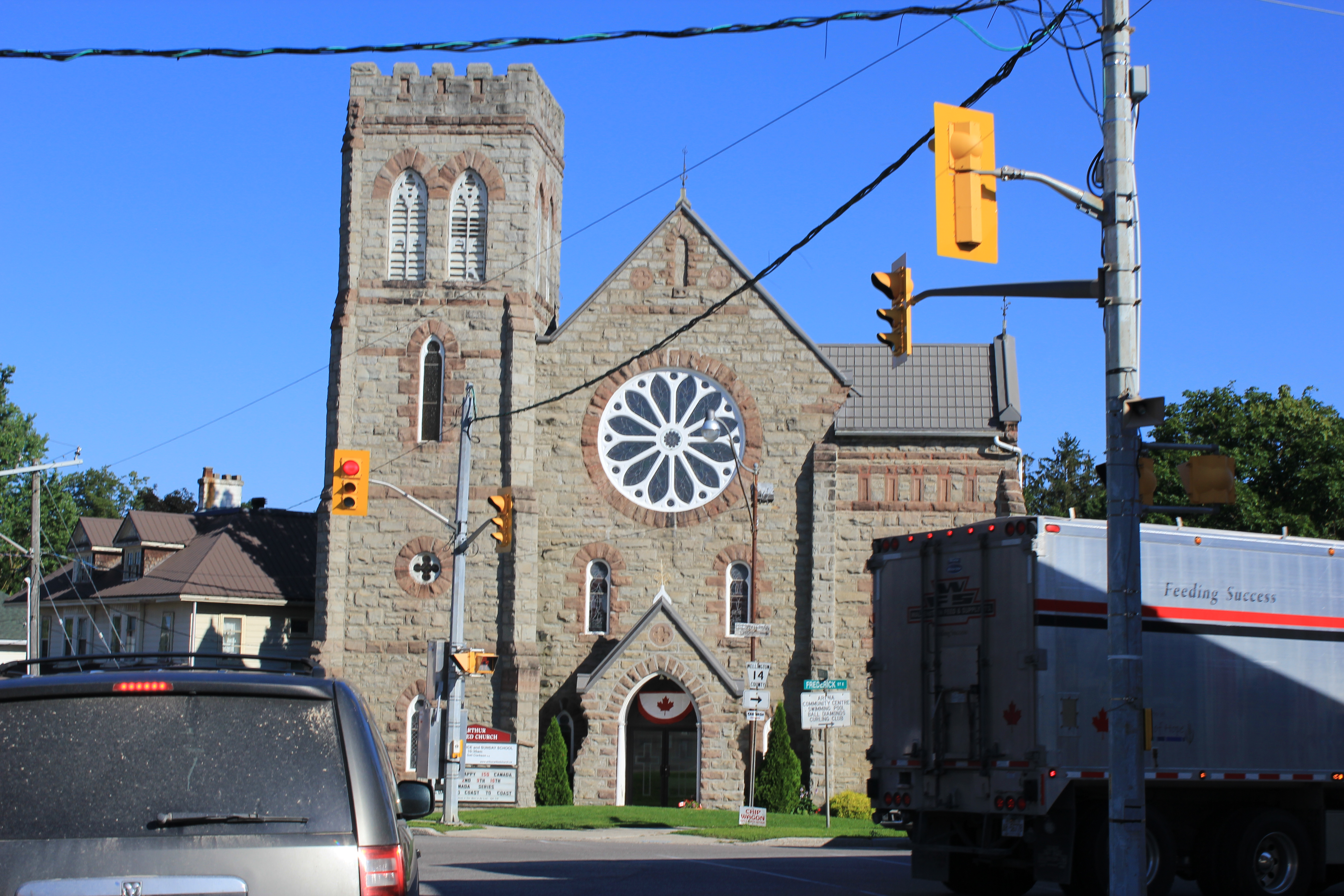
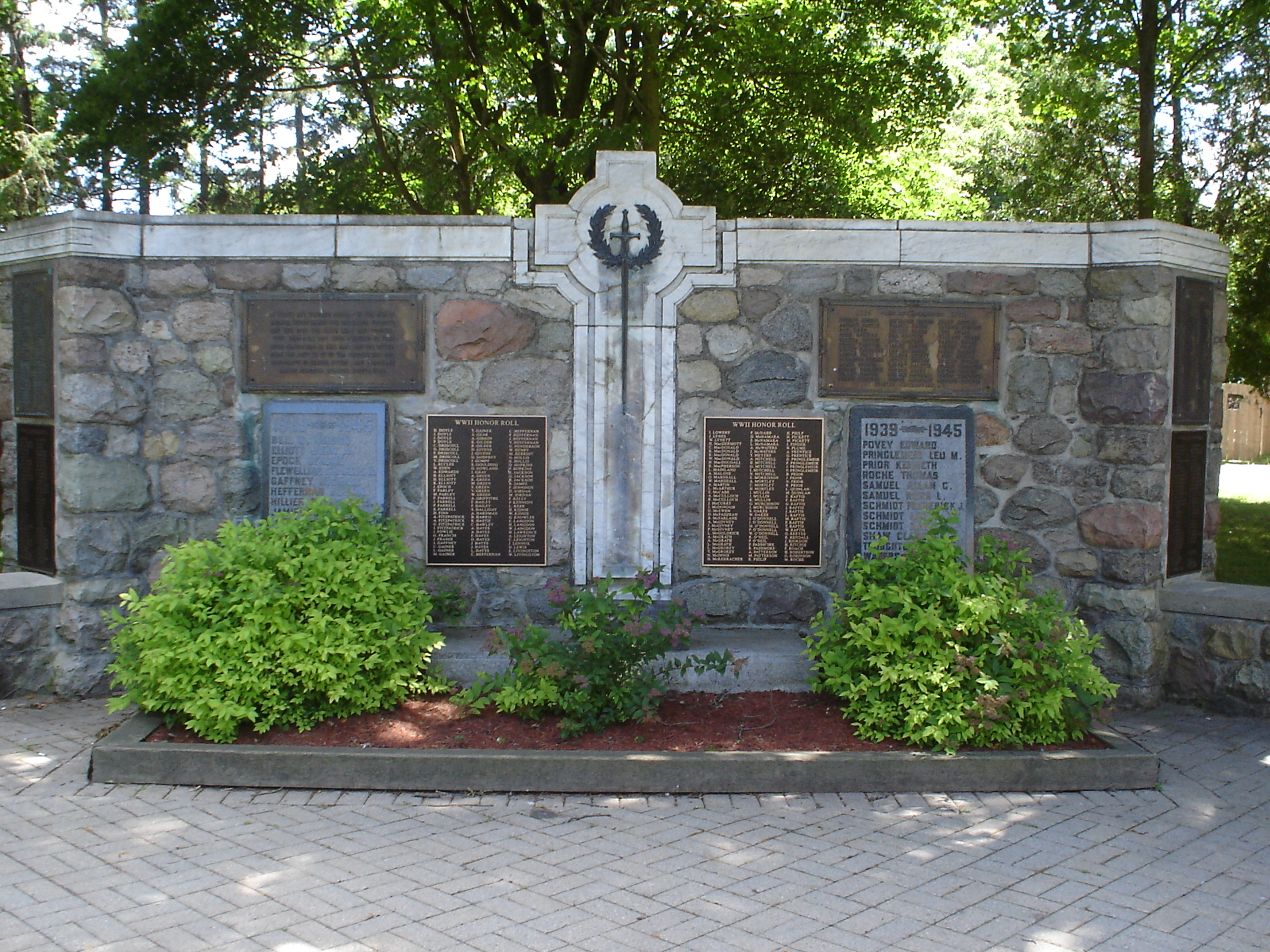
- The Village of Arthur Sign at the corner of Hwy 6 and Wellington Road 109 Post Office Arthur United Church Memorial Park Mural Arthur Cenotaph
- Interactive map of Arthur
- Coordinates: 43°49′58″N 80°32′16″W
- Country: Canada
- Province: Ontario
- County: Wellington County
- Township: Wellington North

Area
  - Total: 524.38 km^{2} (202.46 sq mi)
  - Density: 21.3/km^{2} (55/sq mi)
- Time zone: UTC-5 (EST)
  - Summer (DST): UTC-4 (EDT)
- Forward sortation area: N0G 1A0
- Area codes: 519 and 226
- NTS Map: 040P15
- GNBC Code: FADVI

Arthur (population 2,628) is a community located just north of Highway 6 and Wellington Road 109 in the township of Wellington North, Ontario, Canada. Formerly an independent village, Arthur was amalgamated into Wellington North on January 1, 1999.

== History ==
The village was named after Arthur Wellesley, 1st Duke of Wellington. Settlers began arriving in 1840. The area was first surveyed in 1841 by John McDonald and then officially in 1846 by D.B. Papineau. During the first survey in 1841, the population of Arthur was 22 people. Over the next 15 years, this number rose to 400, and by 1900, the population had risen to just over 1500. The saw and grist mills on the Conestogo River encouraged people to settle here. In 1851, a post office, church and school were organized. Development increased in 1872 when the train line of the Toronto, Grey and Bruce Railway reached the village, which was incorporated in that year. The Arthur Enterprise News, established in 1863, was one of the few non-syndicated weekly newspapers in Canada. By 1890, a high school had been opened. In 1897, Arthur was one of the first villages in Ontario to be connected to an electricity line; power was only available in the evenings.

In 1942, it was reported that one out of every seven Arthur residents fought in the Second World War. By the end of the war, 338 Arthur residents had enlisted, and 25 were killed in action. In 2002, David Tilson, MPP for Dufferin—Peel—Wellington—Grey stated the community was being recognized as "Canada's Most Patriotic Village".

== Demographics ==
Population history of Arthur
Year	Pop.	±%
1881	1,257	—
1891	1,296	+3.1%
1901	1,285	−0.8%
1911	1,102	−14.2%
1921	1,104	+0.2%
1931	1,021	−7.5%
1941	937	−8.2%
1951	1,088	+16.1%
1956	1,124	+3.3%
1961	1,200	+6.8%
1966	1,242	+3.5%
1971	1,414	+13.8%
1976	1,660	+17.4%
1981	1,720	+3.6%
1986	1,842	+7.1%
1991	2,123	+15.3%
1996	2,139	+0.8%
2001	2,284	+6.8%
2006	2,327	+1.9%
2011	2,421	+4.0%
2016	2,556	+5.6%
2021	2,628	+2.8%

As of the 2021 Canadian Census, Arthur's population was 2,628. This represents an increase of 72 people, or 2.8%, compared to the 2016 Canadian Census.

Arthur did not appear in the first Canadian census in 1871.

Arthur's population was 1,257 in 1881, and the total population grew to 1,296 in 1891 before a slight drop to 1,285 in 1901.

From 1901 to 1941, Arthur's population dropped significantly, to a low of 937 in 1941.

Following World War II, Arthur saw a lot of growth. Between 1951 and 1991, the village's population more than doubled, going from 1,088 in 1951 to 2,123 in 1991.

The village has continued to have steady growth since the turn of the century, as Arthur's population has grown from 2,284 in 2001 to 2,628 in 2021.

As of the latest census in 2021, the median age in Arthur is 37.6 years old. There are 1,043 private dwellings in Arthur, with 1,007 of them occupied by usual residents.

The median total income for a household in Arthur was $88,000 in 2020.

== Arts and culture ==
Festivals include:

- Arthur Fall Fair.
- Arthur Lions Duck Race and Horticultural Plant Sale.
- Arthur Opti-Mrs. Santa Claus Parade.
- Artur Optimists Canada Day Weekend.

=== Public library ===
There is a branch of the Wellington County Library system in Arthur.

== Attractions ==
Parks and recreational facilities include:

- Arthur Community Centre Fairgrounds Park, featuring baseball diamonds, a splash pad, pool, playground, and track.
- Arthur Community Park, located along the Conestogo River.
- Arthur Lions Park, featuring a river trail.
- West Luther Trail, which is approximately 11 kilometres (6.8 mi).

== Sports ==
Arthur and Area Community Centre is where local teams play their home games, including baseball, ice hockey, lacrosse, pickleball and softball.

The Arthur Tigers of the WOAA Senior League operated from 1985 to 1999, and won the 1990-91 WOAA Grand Championship.

The Arthur Area Curling Club is hosts bonspiels from October to March.

== Infrastructure ==
=== Transportation ===
Highways include Ontario Highway 6 and Wellington Road 109.

Arthur has five private aerodromes, including Arthur South, Damascus Field, Metz Field, Peskett Field and Walter's Field. The closest major airport is the Region of Waterloo International Airport in Woolwich.

Guelph Owen Sound Transit provides regional bus service, and Ride Well is an on-demand, publicly-funded, rural transit service throughout Wellington County and Guelph.

=== Fire and emergency services ===
Ambulance is provided by the Guelph-Wellington Paramedic Service.

Fire services are provided by the Wellington North Fire Service, a volunteer fire service with approximately 50 volunteer fire fighters.

The Ontario Provincial Police provides service for Arthur.

== Education ==
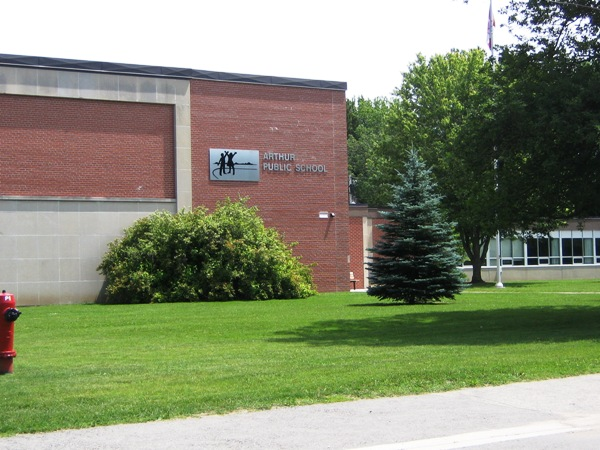
Arthur Public School is a K-8 school located in the community.

=== Upper Grand District School Board ===
Arthur is served by the Upper Grand District School Board as Arthur Public School is a K-8 school located on Conestoga Street. Local high school students in the UGDSB are bussed to Wellington Heights Secondary School in Mount Forest. French immersion students from Arthur are assigned to Palmerston Public School in Palmerston, Ontario when in K-8. French immersion high school students attend Norwell District Secondary School, which is also in Palmerston, when in grades 9-12.

=== Wellington Catholic District School Board ===
Arthur is served by the Wellington Catholic District School Board as St. John Catholic Elementary School is a K-8 school located on Tucker Street. Local high school students in the WCDSB are bussed to Saint James Catholic High School in Guelph.

== Media ==
Arthur and area print media coverage comes from The North Wellington Community News and the Wellington Advertiser.

CIWN-FM from Mount Forest serves the Wellington North area.

CKCO-DT provides local news for Arthur and area.

== Notable people ==
=== Athletes ===
- Chad Culp (1982 – ), professional lacrosse player in the NLL from 2003 – 2011
- Matt Disher (1976 – ), professional lacrosse player in the NLL from 1999 – 2010
- Sydney Healey (2004 – ), professional ice hockey player with the Vegas Vanguards in the PWHL since 2026
- Jamie Rooney (1984 – ), professional lacrosse player in the NLL from 2008 – 2014
- Dave Smith (1968 – ), professional ice hockey player in the ECHL, IHL and AHL from 1992 – 1998; former head coach of Canisius Golden Griffins and RPI Engineers

=== Health care ===
- Andreas Laupacis (???? – ), awarded the Order of Canada for his contributions to evidence-based medicine and for fostering public engagement in health care

=== Politicians ===
- Ted Arnott (1963 – ), member of Legislative Assembly of Ontario from 1990 – 2025, and the 42nd and 43rd Speaker of the Legislative Assembly of Ontario
- John Knox Blair (1873 – 1950), member of the House of Commons of Canada from 1930 – 1945)
- William Aurelius Clarke (1868 – 1940), member of the House of Commons of Canada from 1911 – 1921
- James J. Craig (1855 – 1929), member of the Legislative Assembly of Ontario from 1905 – 1911
- Joseph Driscoll (1876 – 1942), elected to Edmonton City Council from 1912 – 1914, also President of the Edmonton Eskimos
- Frank Gainer (1888 – 1975), member of the Legislative Assembly of Alberta from 1955 – 1967
- Rae Luckock (1893 – 1972), member of the Legislative Assembly of Ontario from 1943 – 1945, also one of the first two women, with Agnes MacPhail, elected to the Legislative Assembly of Ontario
- Dorothy McCabe (1969 – ), Mayor of Waterloo, Ontario from 2022 – 2026
- John Patrick Molloy (1873 – 1948), member of the House of Commons of Canada from 1908 – 1921 and served in the Senate of Canada from 1925 – 1948

== See also ==
- List of unincorporated communities in Ontario
