= Norval, Ontario =

Norval
- Unincorporated community
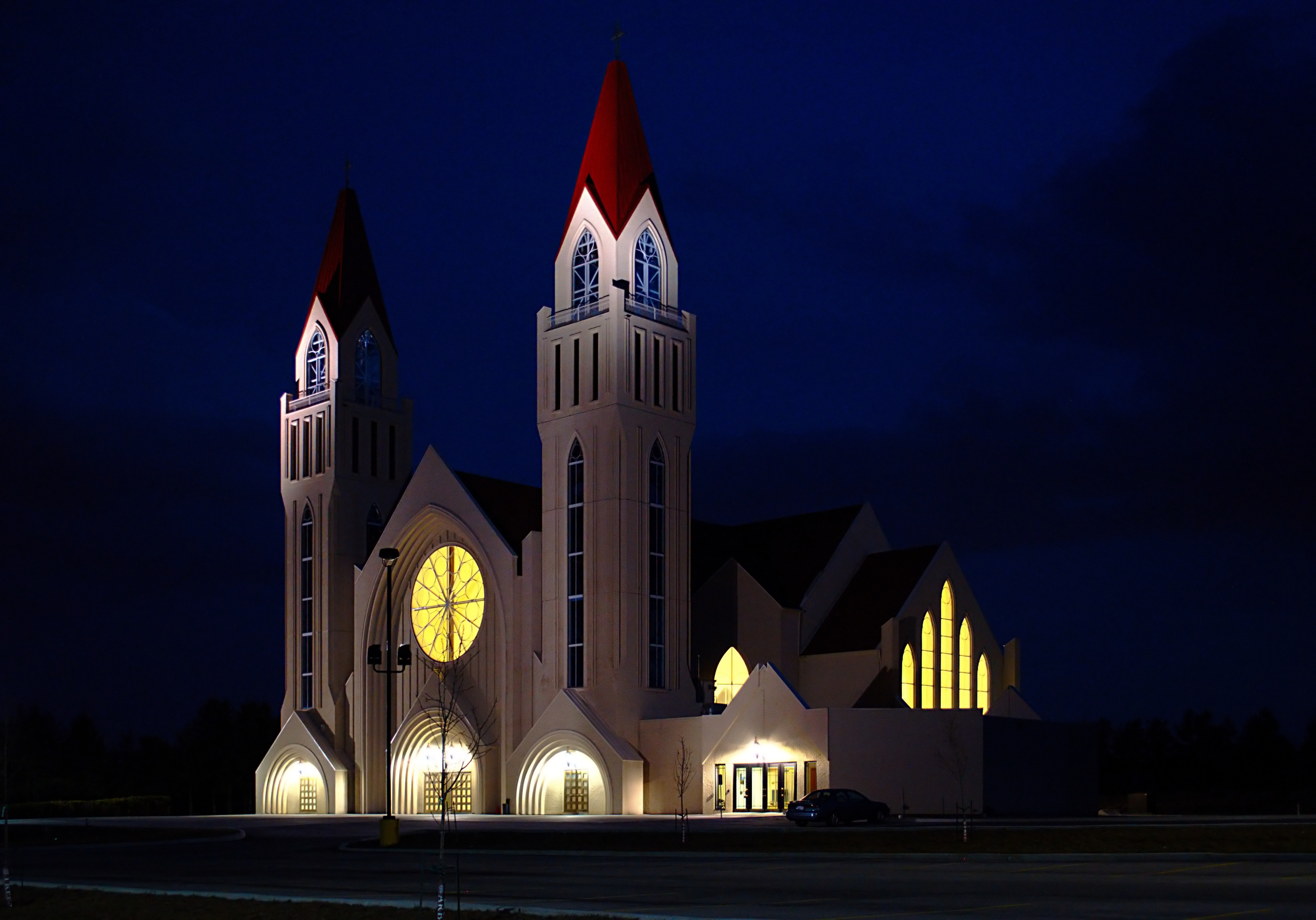
- Our Lady Queen of Peace Church

- Location within Regional Municipality of Halton Location within Southern Ontario Location within Canada
- Coordinates: 43°38′48″N 79°51′32″W
- Country: Canada
- Province: Ontario
- Regional municipality: Halton
- Town: Halton Hills
- Settled: 1820
- Time zone: UTC−05:00 (EST)
  - Summer (DST): UTC−04:00 (EDT)
- Forward sortation area: L0P 1K0
- Area codes: 905 and 289
- NTS Map: 030M12
- GNBC Code: FDKJA

Norval is an unincorporated community in the town of Halton Hills, Ontario, Canada, within the Regional Municipality of Halton. Situated on the Credit River at the intersection of Highway 7 and Winston Churchill Boulevard (locally named Adamson Street), it is located immediately east of Georgetown and approximately 3 km (1.9 mi) west of the current urban boundary of Brampton.

Norval is believed to take its name from the Scottish play Douglas by poet John Home.

== History ==
Around 1820 James McNab and his family arrived; McNab was a United Empire Loyalist and had fought in the War of 1812. The family raised sheep and built a grist and a saw mill on the Credit River. Some of their wood was shipped to England for use as masts on naval ships. Flour mills also opened in this area; the largest one operated until 1930 when it was destroyed in a fire.

In 1836 the post office was established. Previously, the settlement had been called McNabsville and McNab's Mill. In 1838, the mills were sold to Peter Adamson. In 1851, the Guelph Plank Road passed through this area and by 1856 the Grand Trunk Railway had arrived. The latter was useful for shipping goods from this area.

In 1846, the settlement had a population of about 200 inhabitants, served by two churches, various tradesmen, a gristmill, an oatmeal mill, a distillery, two stores and a tavern.

Norval became a thriving village, complete with a broom factory, ashery, bakery, woollen and flax mills, carriage works, a blacksmith and harness shops, brass foundry, general stores, several hotels, a Mechanics' Institute and an Orange Lodge. It was a main stop on the stagecoach ride from Guelph to Toronto.

Upper Canada College's Norval Outdoor School is located nearby at 10444 Winston Churchill Boulevard. Acquired in 1913, it was established in the property after 1935.

Author Lucy Maud Montgomery, who wrote the Anne of Green Gables series, lived in Norval from 1926 to 1935 as her husband Reverend Ewan MacDonald was minister of the Norval Presbyterian Church (opened 1851 and deconsecrated in early 2024 but reconsecrated as Malankara Orthodox Syrian Church in late 2024). In her journal, Montgomery expressed her appreciation for the village’s natural beauty, and declared, “I love Norval as I have never loved any place save Cavendish, PEI. It is as if I had known it all my life".

In 1954 the grist mill was destroyed by Hurricane Hazel. In 1972 the remaining structures were removed to expand Highway 7. Many historic buildings still stand in Norval.

== Annual festivals and events ==
- Earth Week Celebrations - Third week in April
- Heritage Perennial Plant Sale - early May
- Montgomery Christmas - the weekend of November closest to her birthday (November 30)
- Lucy Maud Montgomery Seminars and Readings - various times during the year

== Recreation and parks ==
- Willow Park Ecology Centre
- Lucy Maud Montgomery Garden
- Interpretive Gazebo & Signature Walk
- Norval Park
- Pioneer Cemeteries & McNab Park

== Notable residents ==
- A.J. Casson, Group of Seven, painted Norval in the 1920s and 30's
- John Watkins, born in Norval, a former Ambassador to Russia. The book and movie Agent of Influence were inspired by events in his life.
- John Wycliffe Lowes Forster, born in Norval, portrait painter. Many of his works hang in the Legislative Assembly of Ontario, Toronto, and Ottawa Parliament Buildings.
- Shannon Crawford, Olympic Gold Medallist, rowed to victory as a member of the Women's Eight 1992 crew in Barcelona Spain. Now retired from the sport.
- Lucy Maud Montgomery, author of Anne of Green Gables, lived in Norval for nine years.
- Terry Evans, born in Norval, Olympic Gold Medalist, Middle Weight Wrestling, British Empire Games, London, England, 1934.
