= Ariss, Ontario =

Ariss
- Unincorporated rural community
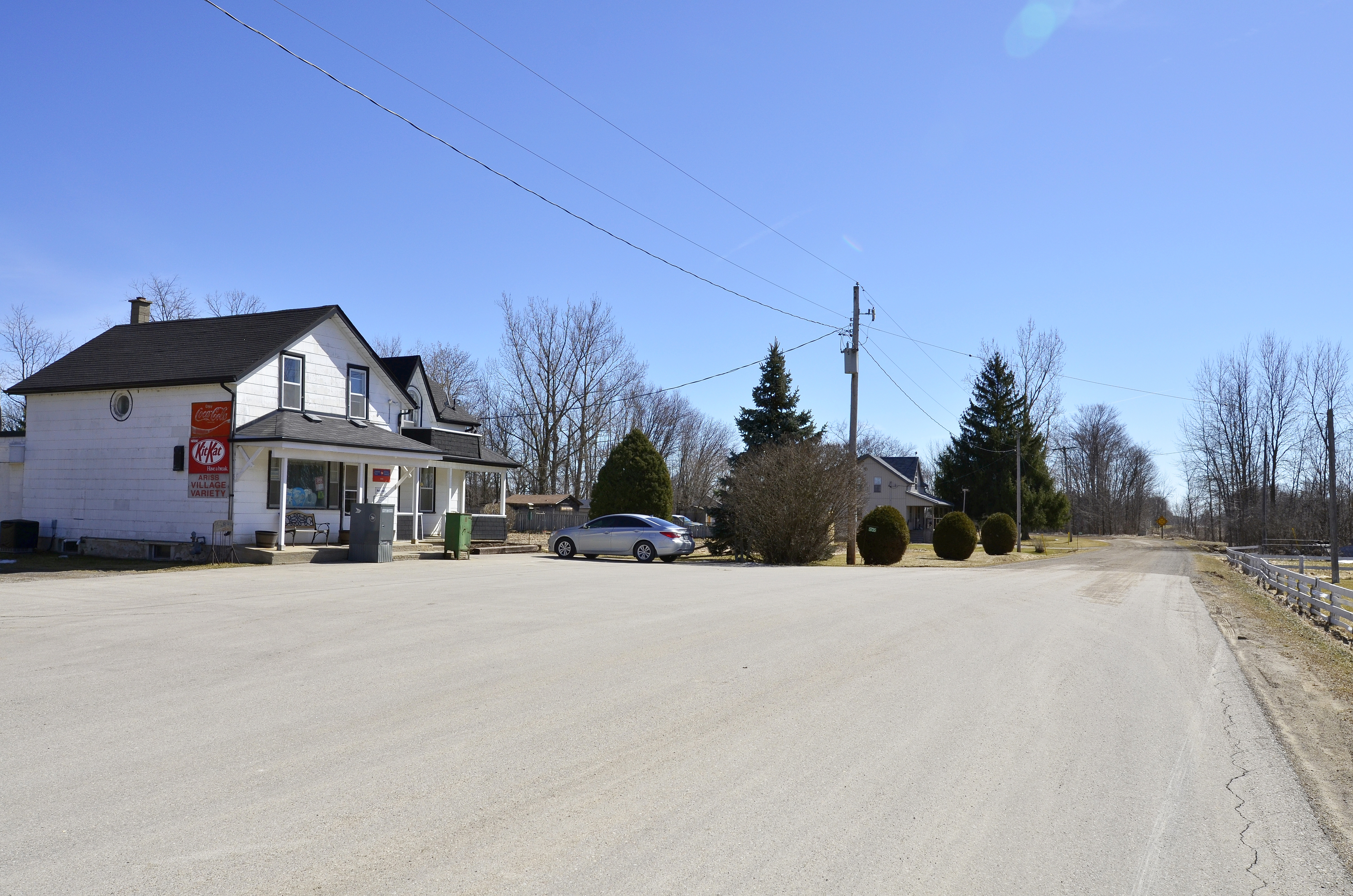
- The Ariss post office has been operating since 1908

- Location of Ariss in Canada Ariss (Ontario)
- Coordinates: 43°34′31″N 80°21′54″W
- Country: Canada
- Province: Ontario
- County: Wellington
- Township: Guelph/Eramosa
- Time zone: UTC-5 (Eastern (EST))
  - Summer (DST): UTC-4 (EDT)
- GNBC Code: FADPK

Ariss is an unincorporated rural community in Guelph/Eramosa Township, Wellington County, Ontario, Canada.

== History ==
By 1900, a hotel, blacksmith shop and a few houses were located at the settlement. In 1903, Joseph and Ellen House opened a store there in a small room of their house.

The Canadian Pacific Railway completed a line from Guelph to Goderich in 1907, passing through the settlement. A large two-story railway station with living quarters for the stationmaster was established there.

Italian labourers were employed to build the rail line, living in a caboose which followed the line's construction. The labourers purchased goods at the House's store, and bought produce from local farmers.

The settlement had no official name prior to the railway being built, and was often called Weissenburg, which was the same name as a settlement located 2 km (1.2 mi) west. Railway officials therefore chose the name Weissenburg for their new station at the settlement. Postal officials objected because the Weissenburg settlement to the west had a post office, and they did not want a post office—and a railway station with the same name—located so far apart. Postal officials instead decided to open a new post office at the settlement near the new train station. Names for the new post office were suggested by residents and included "Martindale", after David Martin, who had owned the land where the railway station was established, and "Ariss", after Mrs. Ariss, the settlement's oldest resident. When Ariss was selected as the name for the new post office, the railway renamed their station Ariss.

Ellen House served as postmaster for 20 years, with the post office located in the family store. Ellen House would carry mail to and from the train station each day. In 1913, two rural mail delivery routes were established from the Ariss post office. The post office and store were sold to Frank Schuett in 1928.

The Ariss railway station was used to ship locally grown hogs, cattle and turnips, while feed and coal were shipped to the Ariss station from Goderich. The station never developed into a significant shipping point, and by the 1920s, not all passenger trains were stopping there. The post office used a "catch pole" so mail could be picked up without the train needing to stop. When the railway station burned down in the 1930s, it was replaced by a much smaller building. Passenger use along the line decreased as a result of the Great Depression and increased ownership of automobiles. Passenger rail service on the line ended in 1955, and the rail line was abandoned in 1988 and the rails removed.

In 1998, the County of Wellington and the Regional Municipality of Waterloo leased 45 km (28 mi) of the former railway bed to create a recreational rail trail. The Kissing Bridge Railtrail ran from Millbank to Guelph, passing through Ariss. The railtrail was lengthened in 2013, and renamed the Goderich to Guelph Rail Trail.

Ariss Valley Golf and Country Club is located south of Ariss.
