= Teviotdale, Ontario =

Teviotdale
- Town
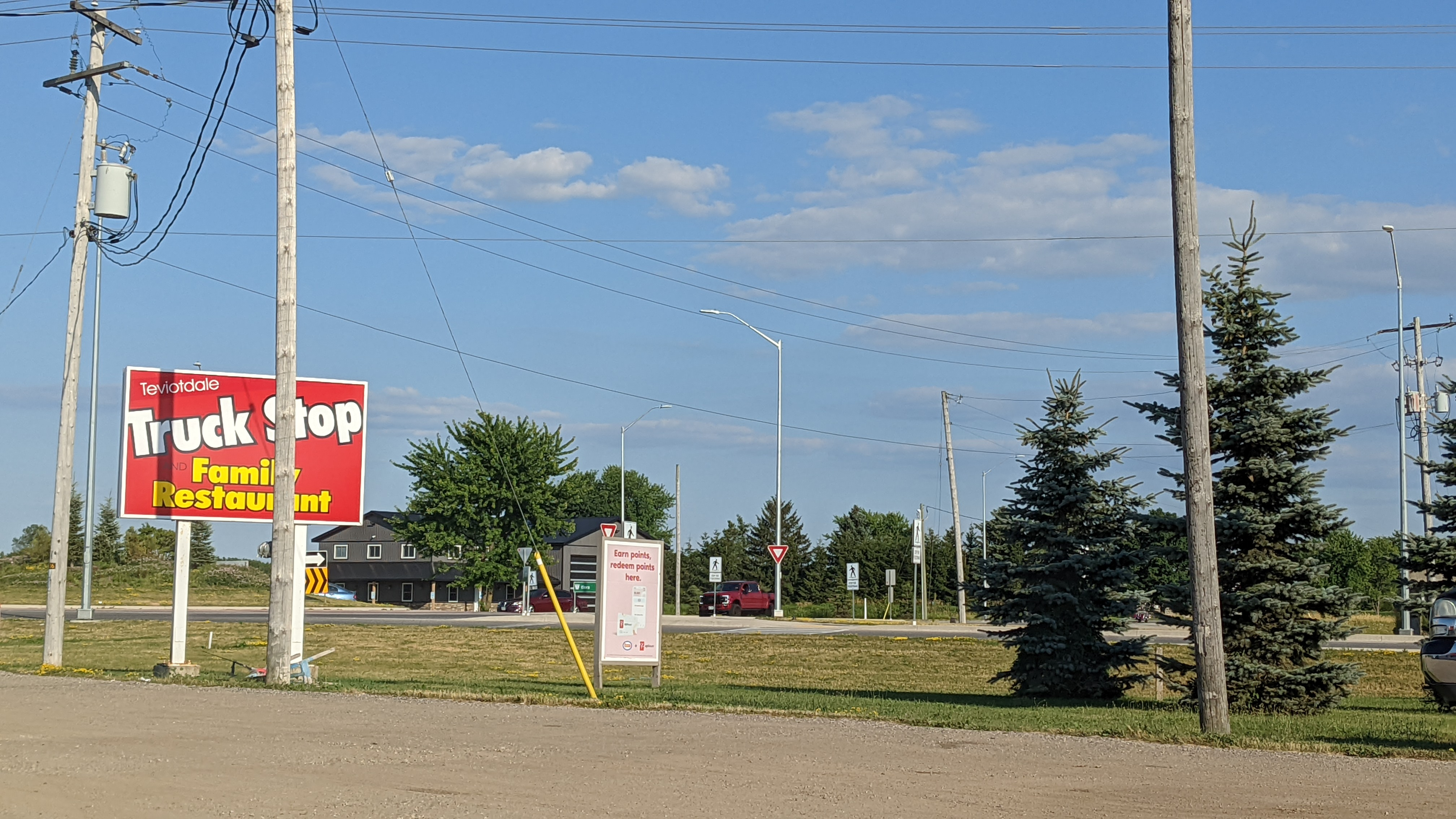
- Interactive map of Teviotdale
- Coordinates: 43°50′41″N 80°45′33″W
- Country: Canada
- Province: Ontario
- Counties: Perth and Wellington
- Townships: North Perth and Minto

Government
  - Type: Municipality of North Perth and Town of Minto
- Elevation: 420 m (1,380 ft)
- Time zone: UTC-5 (EST)
  - Summer (DST): UTC-4 (EDT)
- Area code: 519

Teviotdale is a community which lies on the border between Perth County and Wellington County, Ontario, Canada. Teviotdale is the most northernly community in Perth County.

== Businesses ==
The village is home to a truck stop restaurant, gas station, construction company, bakery, automobile repair shop, wood working retail outlet, and animal feed plant. It is also the location of a large Ontario Provincial Police Detachment.

== History ==
The 1985 International Plowing Match (IPM) was hosted by J.D. Ross & neighbouring farms just outside the village.

There was a speedway in Teviotdale that ran from the early 1950s to the early 1960s. It reopened in 1968 and closed again in the early 1970s. Racing was on Sunday afternoons. The track surface is located behind the feed plant just west of town, the track is visible using historic satellite imagery before 2012. The track is no longer visible from modern satellite imagery as it became over grown between 2012-2015.

Teviotdale was previously the home of a community baseball diamond which was torn down and replaced with the OPP detachment. Teams from Drew, Teviotdale, and Greenbush participated in the Minto Township minor baseball program which was operated by volunteers.

On August 2, 2015, an EF-2 tornado ripped through the village tearing a roof off one home while damaging others.
