= Trafalgar Township =

Former township in Ontario, Canada

Coordinates: 43°30′20″N 79°47′39″W

Trafalgar Township was a township in Ontario, Canada. It today forms parts of Oakville, Milton, Halton Hills and Mississauga.

Historical population
Year	Pop.
1817	548
1841	4,590
1850	4,513
1871	5,027
1891	4,153
1911	3,968
1931	4,442
1951	8,118
1961	31,743
Source: "Early Ward 5 History". Trafalgar Township Historical Society.

Named after Cape Trafalgar where Horatio Nelson led the English fleet to victory over the Spanish and French at the Battle of Trafalgar, the township was created in 1806. Trafalgar was one of three townships surveyed by Samuel Street Wilmot after the purchase of land from the Mississaugas in 1805.

The boundaries extended from Lake Ontario in the south to Steeles Avenue in the north, and from Winston Churchill Boulevard in the east to Burloak Drive in the west. In 1962, the township was amalgamated into Oakville. Dundas Street was the main transportation corridor through the township. The name lives on today as Trafalgar Road, a major north-south road through Oakville and Halton Hills.

Wheat was the main agricultural crop of farms in the township for most of its history with the crop taking up from one quarter to one third of the cultivated land.

== See also ==
- List of townships in Ontario
