= Elora Cataract Trailway =

Rail trail in Ontario, Canada

Coordinates: 43.79394°N 80.31025°W

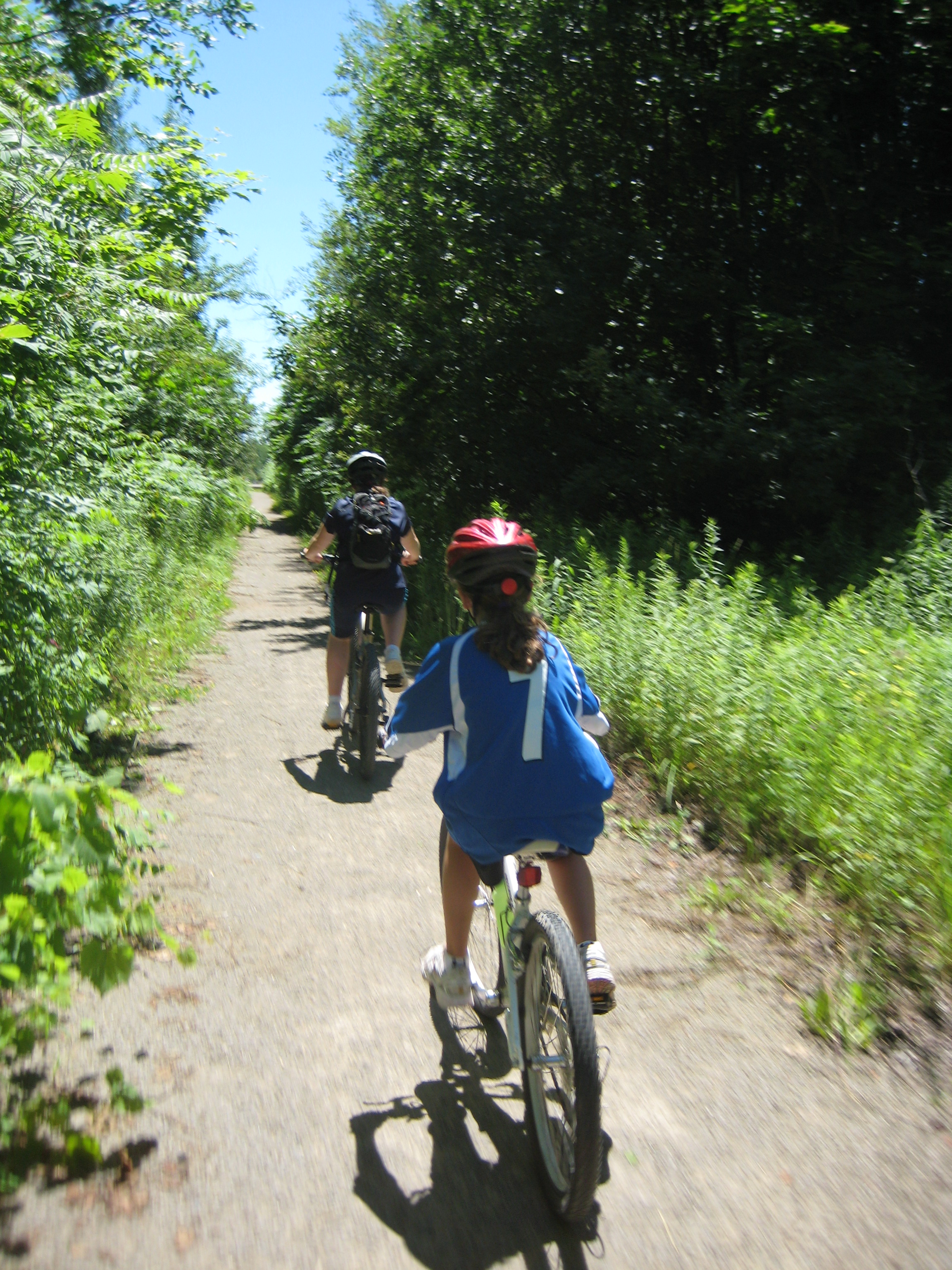
A family cycling along the former rail path

The Elora Cataract Trailway is a 47 km-long recreational rail trail between the towns of Elora and Forks of the Credit, in the south of the province of Ontario, Canada. The former Canadian Pacific Railway line operated from about 1880 until 1988.

Elora Cataract Trailway is operated by The Grand River Conservation Authority (GRCA)
