= Hillsburgh, Ontario =

Coordinates: 43.790367°N 80.144049°W

View of Hillsburgh, Ontario.

Hillsburgh is a small rural community in Southern Ontario, Canada. It is situated within the rolling green hills of Wellington County, and is an urban centre within the Town of Erin. Hillsburgh is best known for its historic small town charm and idyllic countryside. The Elora Cataract Trail runs through Hillsburgh, connecting it to neighbouring communities along the old Canadian Pacific railroad bed. Hillsburgh and the Village of Erin both have deep cultural connections to the equestrian community and are known lovingly as horse country.

== History ==
The land now known as Hillsburgh has been inhabited by many indigenous groups throughout history including the Huron-Wendat, the Haudenosaunee (Iroquois) and most recently the Mississaugas of the Credit First Nation (Anishinaabe). In 1818 the land was purchased by The Crown through the Ajetance Treaty, No. 19 (1818).

On November 7th 1820, Nathaniel Rozell, of Pennsylvania, arrived on lot 1 of the 7th line of Erin Township. The following year, William How and his wife left Kent, England and landed in Toronto, where they picked up their deeds to lots 22 and 23 on the seventh concession. William How and his wife, accompanied by Nathaniel Rozell, arrived at their lot late in the evening and found shelter under some branches leaned against a large tree. After three days, a crude dwelling was erected and the settlement of Howville was born. Mr. How then set up shop, selling goods to the new settlers arriving in Howville. Many of these new settlers were arriving from Scottland, and bringing with them their Gaelic language. At one point Gaelic was so prominent in the community that translators were necessary for important legal matters.

William How expanded his business and moved into a larger building, which was lost in a explosion (along with his eye) after someone put a lit cigar in a barrel of gunpowder. A third store was built, which still stand today on the south end of town on Trafalgar Road.

In 1823, Nazareth Hill and his family arrived and settled on lot 25 of Howville. Nazareth Hill built the first hotel in town, and organized the first Sunday school in the community. He also made the, "Nazareth Hill Survey" of the town, cementing himself as an influential figure within the community. He would go on to impose his name upon the town, changing it officially from Howville to Hillsburg.

In 1899, Hillsburg was incorporated into a police village, and an "H" was added to the end of the name, honouring the town's Scottish influence and officially making it Hillsburgh.

In 1998 Hillsburgh amalgamated alongside the Village of Erin and the rest of the Township of Erin into the current Town of Erin.

== Demographics ==
In the 2021 Census of Population conducted by Statistics Canada, Hillsburgh had a population of 1,152 living in 429 of its 441 total private dwellings, a change of 2.5% from its 2016 population of 1,124. With a land area of 2.94 km^{2} (1.14 sq mi), it had a population density of 391.8/km^{2} (1,014.9/sq mi) in 2021.

== See also ==
- List of communities in Ontario
- List of designated places in Ontario
