= Terra Cotta, Ontario =

Terra Cotta
- Hamlet
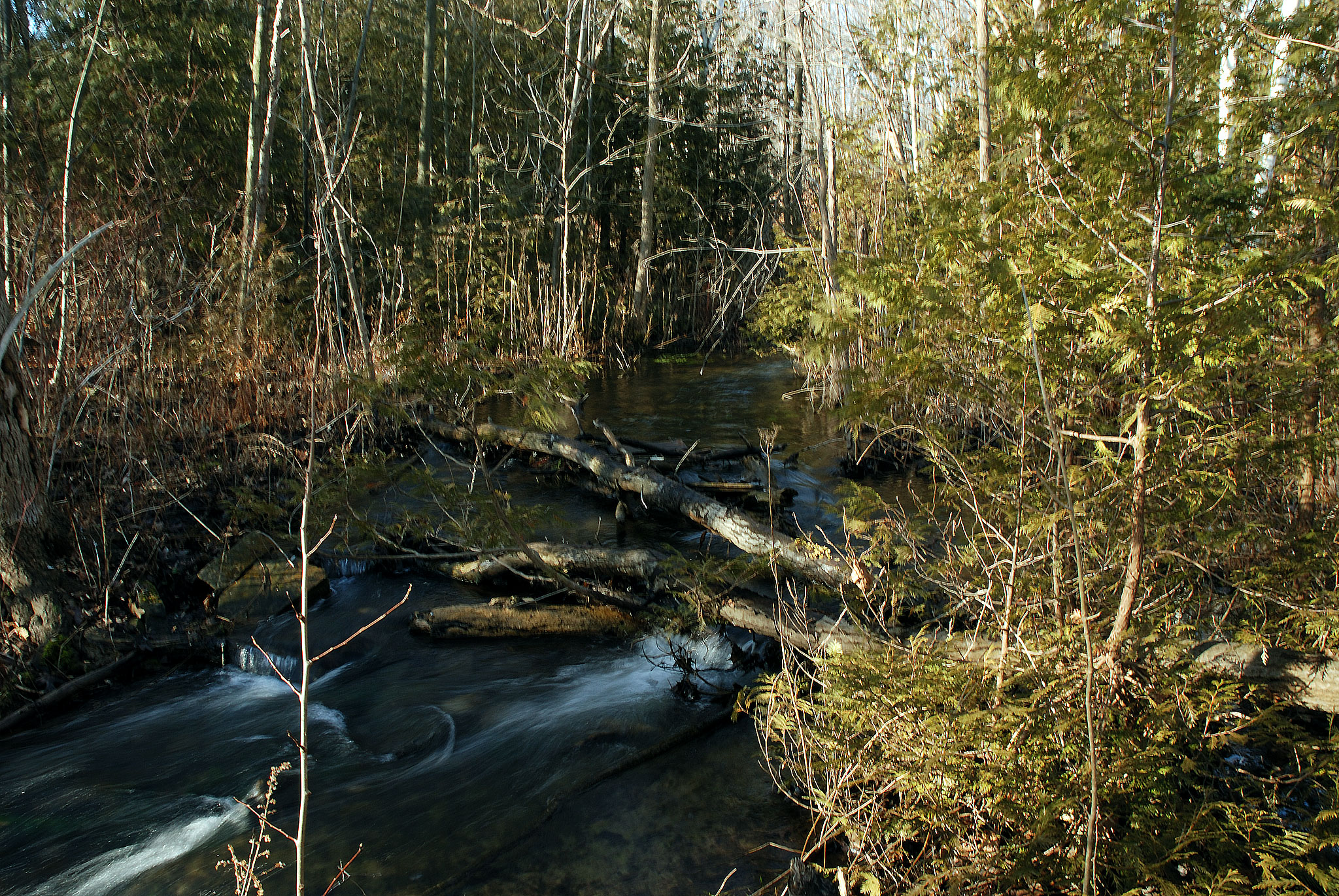
- Terra Cotta Conservation Area
- Interactive map of Terra Cotta
- Country: Canada
- Province: Ontario
- Regional Municipality: Peel
- Town: Caledon
- Settled: 1822
- Established: 1855

Area
  - Total: 0.892 km^{2} (0.344 sq mi)

Population
  - Total: 202

Terra Cotta is a hamlet located in the town of Caledon, within Peel Region, Ontario, Canada.

== Geography ==
The hamlet involves the Terra Cotta Conservation Area, known for its public fishing, hiking and trailing. The hamlet itself is located around wetland areas and small forests, mostly on a flat terrain. Some activities include maple-syrup festival, pond skating and cross-country skiing. The hamlet has a population of 202 and an area of 0.892 square kilometers. The community is home to the Ukrainian-only Poltawa Country Club.

== History ==
Terra Cotta was first established in 1855 by Henry Tucker, who bought 40 acres and built the first mill. Simon Plewes later purchased Tucker's holdings but tragically drowned in 1876. During these periods, the hamlet was known first as Tucker's Mills, then Plewes Mills. The village developed further with the establishment of a church, post office, and school sections, evolving from Salmonville to Terra Cotta by 1891. The construction of the Hamilton and North Western Railway in 1877 facilitated the transportation of limestone and sandstone, contributing to the village's growth. Industries such as quarrying, brick-making, and tourism played significant roles in Terra Cotta's development over the years.
