= East Garafraxa =

- Township (lower-tier)
- Township of East Garafraxa
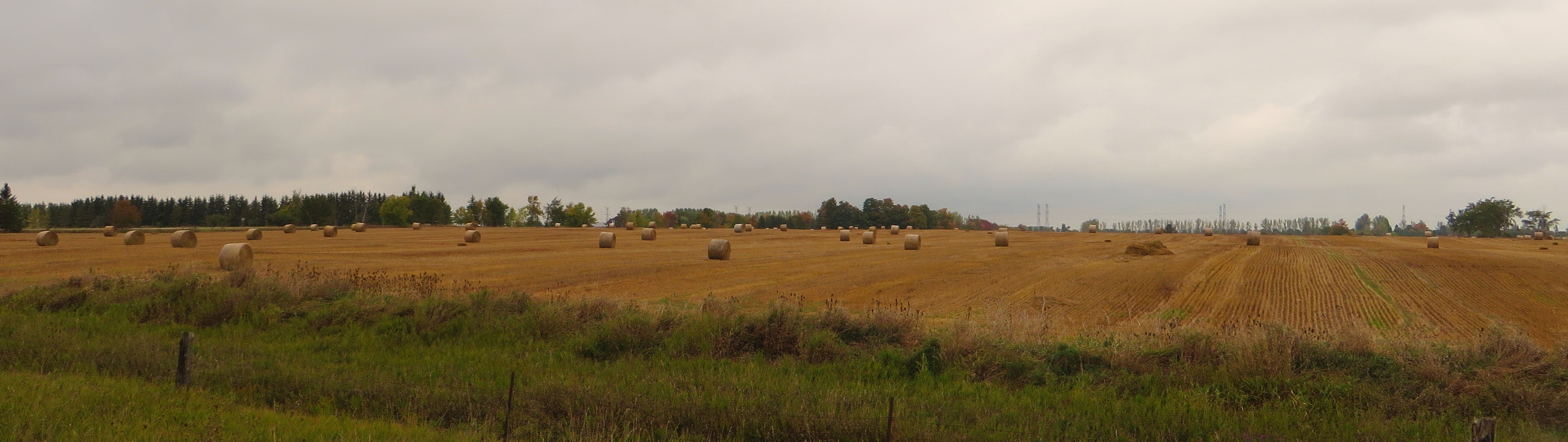

- Location of East Garafraxa within Dufferin County

- Location within Southern Ontario
- Coordinates: 43°51′N 80°15′W
- Country: Canada
- Province: Ontario
- County: Dufferin
- Incorporated: January 1, 1850 (Garafraxa Twp.)
- Incorporated: January 1, 1869 (East Garafraxa)

Government
  - Mayor: Guy Gardhouse
  - Fed. riding: Dufferin—Caledon
  - Prov. riding: Dufferin—Caledon

Area
  - Land: 166.50 km^{2} (64.29 sq mi)

Population (2021)
  - Total: 2,794
  - Density: 16.8/km^{2} (44/sq mi)
- Time zone: UTC-5 (EST)
  - Summer (DST): UTC-4 (EDT)
- Postal Code: L9W
- Area codes: 519, 226, 548
- Website: www.eastgarafraxa.ca

East Garafraxa is a rural township located in Dufferin County, Ontario, Canada, to the west of Orangeville and within relative commuting distance of Toronto, Brampton, Guelph, and Kitchener.

While it is unknown how the name "Garafraxa" came to be, there are a number of theories to its origins:

- It is derived from an Indigeous word meaning "panther country"
- Commemorating an old Irish estate or castle
- From the Scottish stream, the River Garry
- From Gaelic fraoch garbh meaning "rough heath"
- From local botany Saxifrage or Sassafras
- Old English word gara or gar means either a small triangular piece of land or cloth as in a sail, and the Township could be considered part fracta of the Gore, or Gara

East Garafraxa is known for, among other things, its scenic spots, and many people go there to escape from the city.

== Communities ==
The township of East Garafraxa comprises a number of villages and hamlets, including the following communities:

- Garafraxa Woods
- Craigsholme
- Depew's Corners
- Hereward
- Marsville
- McKee's Corner
- North Erin (partially)
- Orton (partially)
- Portadown
- Price's Corners
- Reading
- Rogertown
- The Maples
- Glenmorrow
- Leeson's Corners
- The Grove

== Demographics ==
In the 2021 Census of Population conducted by Statistics Canada, East Garafraxa had a population of 2,794 living in 903 of its 944 total private dwellings, a change of 8.3% from its 2016 population of 2,579. With a land area of 166.5 km^{2} (64.3 sq mi), it had a population density of 16.8/km^{2} (43.5/sq mi) in 2021.

According to the 2011 Canadian Census, the median age was 42.9 years old, a bit higher than the national median at 40.6 years old. According to the 2011 National Household Survey, the median value of a dwelling in East Garafraxa is $500,226, higher than the national average at $280,552. The median household income (after-taxes) in East Garafraxa is $95,069, much higher than the national average at $54,089.

East Garafraxa is mostly made up of European descents. According to the 2016 Census, the racial make up of East Garafraxa is:

- 90.5% White
- 3.7% South Asian
- 3.9% Aboriginal; 3.1% First Nations, 0.8% Metis
- 1.9% Other

Historical census populations – East Garafraxa

Year	Pop.	±%
1871	2,579	—
1881	2,635	+2.2%
1891	2,169	−17.7%
1901	1,895	−12.6%
1911	1,437	−24.2%
1921	1,233	−14.2%
1931	1,115	−9.6%
1941	1,001	−10.2%

Year	Pop.	±%
1951	1,061	+6.0%
1956	1,135	+7.0%
1961	1,143	+0.7%
1966	1,145	+0.2%
1971	1,214	+6.0%
1976	1,490	+22.7%
1981	1,641	+10.1%
1986	1,841	+12.2%

Year	Pop.	±%
1991	2,002	+8.7%
1996	2,084	+4.1%
2001	2,214	+6.2%
2006	2,389	+7.9%
2011	2,595	+8.6%
2016	2,579	−0.6%
2021	2,794	+8.3%

Source: Statistics Canada

== See also ==
- List of townships in Ontario
