= 2012–13 WOAA Senior League season =

- League: WOAA Senior AA Hockey League
- Sport: Hockey
- Duration: Regular season October 2012 – January 2013; Playoffs; February 2013 – April 2013
- Teams: 17
- Finals champions: Sr. AA - Saugeen Shores Winterhawks; Sr. A - Shallow Lake Crushers

WOAA Senior League seasons
- 2011–12 2013–14

The 2012–13 WOAA Senior League season was the 23rd season of the WOAA Senior AA Hockey League. The league played a 24-game regular season which began in October 2012 and concluded in January 2013. The post-season began in February 2013 and concluded in April 2013.

The Saugeen Shores Winterhawks won the WOAA Senior AA Hockey Championship, defeating the Tavistock Royals in the final round of the playoffs.

== Team changes ==
- The Walkerton Capitals announced they were taking a one-year leave of absence for the 2012–13 season. The club did not return and would fold.

== Regular season ==
=== Final standings ===
Note: GP = Games played; W = Wins; L= Losses; OTL = Overtime losses; GF = Goals for; GA = Goals against; Pts = Points; Green shade = Clinched playoff spot

| Rank | North Division | GP | W | L | OTL | Pts | GF | GA |
|---|---|---|---|---|---|---|---|---|
| 1 | Elora Rocks | 24 | 19 | 4 | 1 | 39 | 161 | 91 |
| 2 | Saugeen Shores Winterhawks | 24 | 16 | 7 | 1 | 33 | 122 | 67 |
| 3 | Shelburne Muskies | 24 | 16 | 8 | 0 | 32 | 117 | 99 |
| 4 | Ripley Wolves | 24 | 14 | 9 | 1 | 29 | 92 | 88 |
| 5 | Durham Thundercats | 24 | 13 | 9 | 2 | 28 | 99 | 87 |
| 6 | Shallow Lake Crushers | 24 | 8 | 12 | 4 | 20 | 102 | 105 |
| 7 | Mapleton-Minto 81's | 24 | 7 | 15 | 2 | 16 | 82 | 132 |
| 8 | Lucknow Lancers | 24 | 3 | 21 | 0 | 6 | 69 | 175 |

| Rank | South Division | GP | W | L | OTL | Pts | GF | GA |
|---|---|---|---|---|---|---|---|---|
| 1 | Komoka Classics | 24 | 21 | 2 | 1 | 43 | 149 | 59 |
| 2 | Clinton Radars | 24 | 20 | 4 | 0 | 40 | 124 | 53 |
| 3 | Tavistock Royals | 24 | 15 | 5 | 4 | 34 | 134 | 74 |
| 4 | Tillsonburg Thunder | 24 | 14 | 6 | 4 | 32 | 127 | 96 |
| 5 | Petrolia Squires | 24 | 13 | 9 | 2 | 28 | 110 | 93 |
| 6 | Milverton Four Wheel Drives | 24 | 11 | 12 | 1 | 23 | 103 | 105 |
| 7 | Monkton Wildcats | 24 | 10 | 11 | 3 | 23 | 91 | 83 |
| 8 | Thedford Dirty Dogs | 24 | 4 | 20 | 0 | 8 | 70 | 178 |
| 9 | Goderich Pirates | 24 | 0 | 24 | 0 | 0 | 44 | 211 |

=== Scoring leaders ===
Note: GP = Games played; G = Goals; A = Assists; Pts = Points; PIM = Penalty minutes

| Player | Team | GP | G | A | Pts | PIM |
|---|---|---|---|---|---|---|
| Ryan Stephenson | Komoka Classics | 24 | 23 | 31 | 54 | 18 |
| Bryan Kazarian | Saugeen Shores Winterhawks | 22 | 17 | 37 | 54 | 8 |
| Luke Vick | Clinton Radars | 24 | 22 | 30 | 52 | 26 |
| Tyler Townsend | Tavistock Royals | 24 | 22 | 27 | 49 | 27 |
| Blake Lovell | Shelburne Muskies | 23 | 22 | 23 | 45 | 12 |
| Tyler Doig | Clinton Radars | 24 | 25 | 19 | 44 | 40 |
| John Lunney | Elora Rocks | 23 | 19 | 25 | 44 | 8 |
| Jemery Machin | Elora Rocks | 22 | 20 | 23 | 43 | 4 |
| Cody Hall | Tavistock Royals | 18 | 16 | 24 | 40 | 8 |
| Brock Zinken | Elora Rocks | 24 | 16 | 24 | 40 | 26 |

== Playoffs ==
=== WOAA Senior "AA" Hockey playoffs ===
Divisional quarter-finals
N1 | Elora | 4
N8 | Lucknow | 0
N4 | Ripley | 4
N5 | Durham | 1
N2 | Saugeen Shores | 4
N7 | Mapleton-Minto | 0
N3 | Shelburne | 4
N6 | Shallow Lake | 2
S1 | Komoka | 4
S8 | Thedford | 0
S2 | Clinton | 0
S7 | Monkton | 4
S3 | Tavistock | 4
S6 | Milverton | 1
S4 | Tillsonburg | 2
S5 | Petrolia | 4

Divisional semi-finals
N1 | Elora | 4
N4 | Ripley | 1
N2 | Saugeen Shores | 4
N3 | Shelburne | 0
S1 | Komoka | 4
S7 | Monkton | 1
S3 | Tavistock | 4
S5 | Petrolia | 1

Divisional finals
N1 | Elora | 2
N2 | Saugeen Shores | 4
S1 | Komoka | 2
S3 | Tavistock | 4

WOAA Sr. AA finals
N1 | Saugeen Shores | 4
S3 | Tavistock | 2

==== WOAA Senior AA divisional quarter-finals ====
===== (N1) Elora Rocks vs. (N8) Lucknow Lancers =====
| February 2 | Lucknow Lancers | 1 – 6 | Elora Rocks | Elora |

| February 8 | Lucknow Lancers | 2 – 7 | Elora Rocks | Elora |

| February 9 | Elora Rocks | 4 – 2 | Lucknow Lancers | Lucknow |

| February 15 | Elora Rocks | 11 – 5 | Lucknow Lancers | Lucknow |

| Elora wins series 4 – 0 |

===== (N2) Saugeen Shores Winterhawks vs. (N7) Mapleton-Minto 81's =====
| February 1 | Mapleton-Minto 81's | 0 – 6 | Saugeen Shores Winterhawks | Saugeen Shores |

| February 2 | Saugeen Shores Winterhawks | 5 – 4 | OT | Mapleton-Minto 81's | Harriston |

| February 9 | Saugeen Shores Winterhawks | 10 – 0 | Mapleton-Minto 81's | Harriston |

| February 15 | Mapleton-Minto 81's | 2 – 10 | Saugeen Shores Winterhawks | Saugeen Shores |

| Saugeen Shores wins series 4 – 0 |

===== (N3) Shelburne Muskies vs. (N6) Shallow Lake Crushers =====
Note: Game four played in Dundalk, Ontario.

| February 1 | Shelburne Muskies | 6 – 3 | Shallow Lake Crushers | Shallow Lake |

| February 2 | Shallow Lake Crushers | 5 – 8 | Shelburne Muskies | Shelburne |

| February 9 | Shelburne Muskies | 2 – 1 | Shallow Lake Crushers | Shallow Lake |

| February 10 | Shallow Lake Crushers | 3 – 2 | OT | Shelburne Muskies | Shelburne |

| February 16 | Shallow Lake Crushers | 5 – 4 | Shelburne Muskies | Shelburne |

| February 18 | Shelburne Muskies | 6 – 2 | Shallow Lake Crushers | Shallow Lake |

| Shelburne wins series 4 – 2 |

===== (N4) Ripley Wolves vs. (N5) Durham Thundercats =====
| February 1 | Durham Thundercats | 1 – 7 | Ripley Wolves | Ripley |

| February 8 | Ripley Wolves | 3 – 2 | OT | Durham Thundercats | Durham |

| February 9 | Durham Thundercats | 4 – 3 | OT | Ripley Wolves | Ripley |

| February 15 | Ripley Wolves | 3 – 2 | OT | Durham Thundercats | Durham |

| February 16 | Durham Thundercats | 4 – 5 | Ripley Wolves | Ripley |

| Ripley wins series 4 – 1 |

===== (S1) Komoka Classics vs. (S8) Thedford Dirty Dogs =====
Note: Game four played in Ilderton, Ontario.

| February 2 | Thedford Dirty Dogs | 1 – 5 | Komoka Classics | Komoka |

| February 3 | Komoka Classics | 9 – 4 | Thedford Dirty Dogs | Thedford |

| February 9 | Komoka Classics | 9 – 1 | Thedford Dirty Dogs | Thedford |

| February 10 | Thedford Dirty Dogs | 0 – 4 | Komoka Classics | Komoka |

| Komoka wins series 4 – 0 |

===== (S2) Clinton Radars vs. (S7) Monkton Wildcats =====
| February 1 | Monkton Wildcats | 3 – 2 | Clinton Radars | Clinton |

| February 3 | Clinton Radars | 0 – 1 | Monkton Wildcats | Monkton |

| February 8 | Monkton Wildcats | 5 – 3 | Clinton Radars | Clinton |

| February 9 | Clinton Radars | 1 – 2 | Monkton Wildcats | Monkton |

| Monkton wins series 4 – 0 |

===== (S3) Tavistock Royals vs. (S6) Milverton Four Wheel Drives =====
| February 2 | Milverton Four Wheel Drives | 1 – 7 | Tavistock Royals | Tavistock |

| February 3 | Tavistock Royals | 5 – 7 | Milverton Four Wheel Drives | Milverton |

| February 9 | Milverton Four Wheel Drives | 1 – 7 | Tavistock Royals | Tavistock |

| February 10 | Tavistock Royals | 5 – 4 | OT | Milverton Four Wheel Drives | Milverton |

| February 16 | Milverton Four Wheel Drives | 3 – 4 | OT | Tavistock Royals | Tavistock |

| Tavistock wins series 4 – 1 |

===== (S4) Tillsonburg Thunder vs. (S5) Petrolia Squires =====
| February 2 | Petrolia Squires | 5 – 6 | Tillsonburg Thunder | Tillsonburg |

| February 10 | Petrolia Squires | 3 – 6 | Tillsonburg Thunder | Tillsonburg |

| February 12 | Tillsonburg Thunder | 3 – 5 | Petrolia Squires | Petrolia |

| February 15 | Tillsonburg Thunder | 2 – 3 | OT | Petrolia Squires | Petrolia |

| February 16 | Petrolia Squires | 5 – 3 | Tillsonburg Thunder | Tillsonburg |

| February 17 | Tillsonburg Thunder | 1 – 2 | Petrolia Squires | Petrolia |

| Petrolia wins series 4 – 2 |

==== WOAA Senior AA divisional semi-finals ====
===== (N1) Elora Rocks vs. (N4) Ripley Wolves =====
| February 22 | Ripley Wolves | 3 – 5 | Elora Rocks | Elora |

| February 23 | Elora Rocks | 4 – 5 | Ripley Wolves | Ripley |

| March 1 | Ripley Wolves | 2 – 5 | Elora Rocks | Elora |

| March 2 | Elora Rocks | 4 – 1 | Ripley Wolves | Ripley |

| March 8 | Ripley Wolves | 3 – 7 | Elora Rocks | Elora |

| Elora wins series 4 – 1 |

===== (N2) Saugeen Shores Winterhawks vs. (N3) Shelburne Muskies =====
| February 22 | Shelburne Muskies | 4 – 8 | Saugeen Shores Winterhawks | Saugeen Shores |

| February 23 | Saugeen Shores Winterhawks | 5 – 1 | Shelburne Muskies | Shelburne |

| March 1 | Shelburne Muskies | 3 – 4 | Saugeen Shores Winterhawks | Saugeen Shores |

| March 2 | Saugeen Shores Winterhawks | 8 – 4 | Shelburne Muskies | Shelburne |

| Saugeen Shores wins series 4 – 0 |

===== (S1) Komoka Classics vs. (S7) Monkton Wildcats =====
| February 23 | Monkton Wildcats | 4 – 3 | OT | Komoka Classics | Komoka |

| March 1 | Komoka Classics | 4 – 1 | Monkton Wildcats | Monkton |

| March 2 | Monkton Wildcats | 2 – 3 | OT | Komoka Classics | Komoka |

| March 8 | Komoka Classics | 2 – 0 | Monkton Wildcats | Monkton |

| March 9 | Monkton Wildcats | 2 – 6 | Komoka Classics | Komoka |

| Komoka wins series 4 – 1 |

===== (S3) Tavistock Royals vs. (S5) Petrolia Squires =====
| February 22 | Tavistock Royals | 6 – 2 | Petrolia Squires | Petrolia |

| February 23 | Petrolia Squires | 1 – 3 | Tavistock Royals | Tavistock |

| March 1 | Tavistock Royals | 6 – 3 | Petrolia Squires | Petrolia |

| March 2 | Petrolia Squires | 4 – 5 | Tavistock Royals | Tavistock |

| March 6 | Petrolia Squires | 1 – 4 | Tavistock Royals | Tavistock |

| Tavistock wins series 4 – 1 |

==== WOAA Senior AA divisional finals ====
===== (N1) Elora Rocks vs. (N2) Saugeen Shores Winterhawks =====
| March 15 | Saugeen Shores Winterhawks | 4 – 3 | OT | Elora Rocks | Elora |

| March 16 | Elora Rocks | 5 – 4 | Saugeen Shores Winterhawks | Saugeen Shores |

| March 22 | Saugeen Shores Winterhawks | 2 – 3 | OT | Elora Rocks | Elora |

| March 23 | Elora Rocks | 4 – 6 | Saugeen Shores Winterhawks | Saugeen Shores |

| March 29 | Saugeen Shores Winterhawks | 4 – 2 | Elora Rocks | Elora |

| March 30 | Elora Rocks | 1 – 4 | Saugeen Shores Winterhawks | Saugeen Shores |

| Saugeen Shores wins series 4 – 2 |

===== (S1) Komoka Classics vs. (S3) Tavistock Royals =====
| March 16 | Tavistock Royals | 2 – 3 | OT | Komoka Classics | Komoka |

| March 17 | Komoka Classics | 1 – 2 | Tavistock Royals | Tavistock |

| March 22 | Komoka Classics | 1 – 4 | Tavistock Royals | Tavistock |

| March 23 | Tavistock Royals | 3 – 4 | Komoka Classics | Komoka |

| March 30 | Tavistock Royals | 5 – 3 | Komoka Classics | Komoka |

| March 31 | Komoka Classics | 0 – 5 | Tavistock Royals | Tavistock |

| Tavistock wins series 4 – 2 |

==== WOAA Sr. AA Championship ====
===== (N2) Saugeen Shores Winterhawks vs. (S3) Tavistock Royals =====
| April 5 | Saugeen Shores Winterhawks | 2 – 5 | Tavistock Royals | Tavistock |

| April 6 | Tavistock Royals | 5 – 6 | OT | Saugeen Shores Winterhawks | Saugeen Shores |

| April 13 | Tavistock Royals | 5 – 6 | OT | Saugeen Shores Winterhawks | Saugeen Shores |

| April 19 | Saugeen Shores Winterhawks | 1 – 5 | Tavistock Royals | Tavistock |

| April 20 | Saugeen Shores Winterhawks | 4 – 3 | OT | Tavistock Royals | Tavistock |

| April 21 | Tavistock Royals | 1 – 3 | Saugeen Shores Winterhawks | Saugeen Shores |

| Saugeen Shores wins series 4 – 2 |

=== WOAA Senior "A" Hockey playoffs ===
The Durham Thundercats, Lucknow Lancers, Shallow Lake Crushers and Thedford Dirty Dogs participated in the Senior A playoffs.

==== WOAA Senior A quarter-finals ====
===== (S8) Thedford Dirty Dogs vs. (N8) Lucknow Lancers =====
| February 22 | Thedford Dirty Dogs | 5 – 8 | Lucknow Lancers | Lucknow |

| February 23 | Lucknow Lancers | 6 – 4 | Thedford Dirty Dogs | Thedford |

| Lucknow wins series 2 – 0 |

==== WOAA Senior A semi-finals ====
===== Round robin =====
The top two teams in the round robin qualify for the WOAA Sr. "A" finals.

| Rank | Round robin | GP | W | L | Pts | GF | GA |
|---|---|---|---|---|---|---|---|
| 1 | Shallow Lake Crushers | 3 | 3 | 0 | 6 | 17 | 5 |
| 2 | Durham Thundercats | 3 | 2 | 1 | 4 | 15 | 14 |
| 3 | Lucknow Lancers | 4 | 0 | 4 | 0 | 14 | 27 |

==== WOAA Senior A finals ====
===== (N5) Durham Thundercats vs. (N6) Shallow Lake Crushers =====
| March 15 | Shallow Lake Crushers | 4 – 6 | Durham Thundercats | Durham |

| March 22 | Durham Thundercats | 2 – 3 | Shallow Lake Crushers | Shallow Lake |

| March 23 | Shallow Lake Crushers | 4 – 2 | Durham Thundercats | Durham |

| Shallow Lake wins series 2 – 1 |
