= 2013–14 WOAA Senior League season =

- League: WOAA Senior AA Hockey League
- Sport: Hockey
- Duration: Regular season October 2013 – January 2014; Playoffs; January 2014 – April 2014
- Teams: 16
- Finals champions: Sr. AA - Komoka Classics

WOAA Senior League seasons
- 2012–13 2014–15

The 2013–14 WOAA Senior League season was the 24th season of the WOAA Senior AA Hockey League. The league played a 24-game regular season which began in October 2013 and concluded in January 2014. The post-season began in January 2014 and concluded in April 2014.

The Komoka Classics won the WOAA Senior AA Hockey Championship, defeating the Mapleton-Minto 81's in the final round of the playoffs.

== Team changes ==
- The Thedford Dirty Dogs suspended operations over the summer.
- Playoff format changed this season as the "A" playoff bracket was not held.

== Regular season ==
=== Final standings ===
Note: GP = Games played; W = Wins; L= Losses; OTL = Overtime losses; GF = Goals for; GA = Goals against; Pts = Points; Green shade = Clinched playoff spot

Rank	North Division	GP	W	L	OTL	Pts	GF	GA
1	Mapleton-Minto 81's	24	20	4	0	40	145	70
2	Elora Rocks	24	18	3	3	39	161	88
3	Saugeen Shores Winterhawks	24	18	3	3	39	126	72
4	Shallow Lake Crushers	24	12	10	2	26	92	91
5	Durham Thundercats	24	9	10	5	23	90	111
6	Ripley Wolves	24	9	12	3	21	98	124
7	Shelburne Muskies	24	7	17	0	14	85	128
8	Lucknow Lancers	24	3	20	1	7	68	181

Rank	South Division	GP	W	L	OTL	Pts	GF	GA
1	Tillsonburg Thunder	24	21	3	0	42	128	70
2	Tavistock Royals	24	16	6	2	34	144	78
3	Komoka Classics	24	16	6	2	34	139	89
4	Clinton Radars	24	12	10	2	26	109	78
5	Petrolia Squires	24	11	10	3	25	107	107
6	Monkton Wildcats	24	9	9	6	24	82	108
7	Milverton Four Wheel Drives	24	10	11	3	23	88	115
8	Goderich Pirates	24	1	23	0	2	56	208

=== Scoring leaders ===
Note: GP = Games played; G = Goals; A = Assists; Pts = Points; PIM = Penalty minutes

Player	Team	GP	G	A	Pts	PIM
Scott Tregunna	Mapleton-Minto 81's	24	24	24	48	22
Zach Graham	Mapleton-Minto 81's	24	16	29	45	34
Andrew Coburn	Mapleton-Minto 81's	21	17	26	43	26
Ryan Stephenson	Komoka Classics	23	15	27	42	12
Jeremy Machin	Elora Rocks	23	13	29	42	8
Deryk Whitehead	Clinton Radars	18	15	26	41	16
Bryan Kazarian	Saugeen Shores Winterhawks	23	8	33	41	18
John Lunney	Elora Rocks	21	18	21	39	52
Blake Underwood	Saugeen Shores Winterhawks	21	15	24	39	4
Adam Alexander	Saugeen Shores Winterhawks	24	20	18	38	12

== Playoffs ==
=== WOAA Senior "AA" Hockey playoffs ===
Divisional quarter-finals
N1	Mapleton-Minto	4
N8	Lucknow	0
N4	Shallow Lake	0
N5	Durham	4
N2	Elora	4
N7	Shelburne	0
N3	Saugeen Shores	4
N6	Ripley	1
S1	Tillsonburg	4
S8	Goderich	0
S4	Clinton	4
S5	Petrolia	1
S2	Tavistock	4
S7	Milverton	1
S3	Komoka	4
S6	Monkton	0

Divisional semi-finals
N1	Mapleton-Minto	4
N5	Durham	1
N2	Elora	4
N3	Saugeen Shores	1
S1	Tillsonburg	4
S4	Clinton	2
S2	Tavistock	1
S3	Komoka	4

Divisional finals
N1	Mapleton-Minto	4
N2	Elora	0
S1	Tillsonburg	1
S3	Komoka	4

WOAA Sr. AA finals
N1	Mapleton-Minto	2
S3	Komoka	4

==== WOAA Senior AA divisional quarter-finals ====
===== (N1) Mapleton-Minto 81's vs. (N8) Lucknow Lancers =====
February 7	Mapleton-Minto 81's	8 – 2	Lucknow Lancers	Lucknow

February 8	Lucknow Lancers	1 – 9	Mapleton-Minto 81's	Palmerston

February 14	Lucknow Lancers	2 – 9	Mapleton-Minto 81's	Palmerston

February 15	Mapleton-Minto 81's	8 – 2	Lucknow Lancers	Lucknow

Mapleton-Minto wins series 4 – 0

===== (N2) Elora Rocks vs. (N7) Shelburne Muskies =====
February 7	Shelburne Muskies	3 – 9	Elora Rocks	Elora

February 8	Elora Rocks	11 – 6	Shelburne Muskies	Shelburne

February 13	Shelburne Muskies	2 – 7	Elora Rocks	Elora

February 15	Elora Rocks	8 – 3	Shelburne Muskies	Shelburne

Elora wins series 4 – 0

===== (N3) Saugeen Shores Winterhawks vs. (N6) Ripley Wolves =====
February 7	Ripley Wolves	2 – 5	Saugeen Shores Winterhawks	Saugeen Shores

February 8	Saugeen Shores Winterhawks	3 – 2	Ripley Wolves	Ripley

February 9	Saugeen Shores Winterhawks	3 – 2	OT	Ripley Wolves	Ripley

February 14	Ripley Wolves	3 – 2	Saugeen Shores Winterhawks	Saugeen Shores

February 15	Ripley Wolves	0 – 1	OT	Saugeen Shores Winterhawks	Saugeen Shores

Saugeen Shores wins series 4 – 1

===== (N4) Shallow Lake Crushers vs. (N5) Durham Thundercats =====
February 1	Durham Thundercats	5 – 2	Shallow Lake Crushers	Shallow Lake

February 7	Shallow Lake Crushers	4 – 6	Durham Thundercats	Durham

February 8	Durham Thundercats	3 – 2	Shallow Lake Crushers	Shallow Lake

February 14	Shallow Lake Crushers	2 – 3	Durham Thundercats	Durham

Durham wins series 4 – 0

===== (S1) Tillsonburg Thunder vs. (S8) Goderich Pirates =====
February 1	Goderich Pirates	1 – 10	Tillsonburg Thunder	Tillsonburg

February 7	Tillsonburg Thunder	13 – 1	Goderich Pirates	Goderich

February 8	Tillsonburg Thunder	7 – 3	Goderich Pirates	Goderich

February 14	Goderich Pirates	1 – 5	Tillsonburg Thunder	Tillsonburg

Tillsonburg wins series 4 – 0

===== (S2) Tavistock Royals vs. (S7) Milverton Four Wheel Drives =====
February 1	Milverton Four Wheel Drives	3 – 7	Tavistock Royals	Tavistock

February 2	Tavistock Royals	4 – 6	Milverton Four Wheel Drives	Milverton

February 8	Milverton Four Wheel Drives	1 – 4	Tavistock Royals	Tavistock

February 14	Tavistock Royals	5 – 2	Milverton Four Wheel Drives	Milverton

February 15	Milverton Four Wheel Drives	2 – 5	Tavistock Royals	Tavistock

Tavistock wins series 4 – 1

===== (S3) Komoka Classics vs. (S6) Monkton Wildcats =====
January 31	Komoka Classics	6 – 3	Monkton Wildcats	Monkton

February 1	Monkton Wildcats	2 – 6	Komoka Classics	Komoka

February 8	Monkton Wildcats	2 – 4	Komoka Classics	Komoka

February 9	Komoka Classics	3 – 2	Monkton Wildcats	Monkton

Komoka wins series 4 – 0

===== (S4) Clinton Radars vs. (S5) Petrolia Squires =====
January 31	Petrolia Squires	0 – 3	Clinton Radars	Clinton

February 1	Clinton Radars	3 – 2	OT	Petrolia Squires	Petrolia

February 7	Petrolia Squires	3 – 2	OT	Clinton Radars	Clinton

February 8	Clinton Radars	5 – 2	Petrolia Squires	Petrolia

February 14	Petrolia Squires	4 – 6	Clinton Radars	Clinton

Clinton wins series 4 – 1

==== WOAA Senior AA divisional semi-finals ====
===== (N1) Mapleton-Minto 81's vs. (N5) Durham Thundercats =====
Note: Game four played in Drayton.
Note: Game five played in Mount Forest.

February 21	Mapleton-Minto 81's	4 – 3	OT	Durham Thundercats	Durham

February 23	Durham Thundercats	3 – 5	Mapleton-Minto 81's	Palmerston

February 28	Mapleton-Minto 81's	2 – 4	Durham Thundercats	Durham

March 1	Durham Thundercats	3 – 5	Mapleton-Minto 81's	Palmerston

March 8	Durham Thundercats	3 – 7	Mapleton-Minto 81's	Palmerston

Mapleton-Minto wins series 4 – 1

===== (N2) Elora Rocks vs. (N3) Saugeen Shores Winterhawks =====
February 21	Saugeen Shores Winterhawks	3 – 7	Elora Rocks	Elora

February 22	Elora Rocks	5 – 4	OT	Saugeen Shores Winterhawks	Saugeen Shores

February 28	Saugeen Shores Winterhawks	4 – 0	Elora Rocks	Elora

March 1	Elora Rocks	4 – 1	Saugeen Shores Winterhawks	Saugeen Shores

March 7	Saugeen Shores Winterhawks	3 – 6	Elora Rocks	Elora

Elora wins series 4 – 1

===== (S1) Tillsonburg Thunder vs. (S4) Clinton Radars =====
February 22	Clinton Radars	4 – 6	Tillsonburg Thunder	Tillsonburg

February 28	Tillsonburg Thunder	2 – 4	Clinton Radars	Clinton

March 1	Clinton Radars	1 – 2	Tillsonburg Thunder	Tillsonburg

March 7	Tillsonburg Thunder	0 – 1	OT	Clinton Radars	Clinton

March 8	Clinton Radars	2 – 4	Tillsonburg Thunder	Tillsonburg

March 9	Tillsonburg Thunder	5 – 1	Clinton Radars	Clinton

Tillsonburg wins series 4 – 2

===== (S2) Tavistock Royals vs. (S3) Komoka Classics =====
Note: Game two played in Lucan.

February 22	Komoka Classics	7 – 2	Tavistock Royals	Tavistock

February 26	Tavistock Royals	7 – 4	Komoka Classics	Komoka

February 28	Komoka Classics	5 – 2	Tavistock Royals	Tavistock

March 1	Tavistock Royals	4 – 7	Komoka Classics	Komoka

March 8	Komoka Classics	3 – 1	Tavistock Royals	Tavistock

Komoka wins series 4 – 1

==== WOAA Senior AA divisional finals ====
===== (N1) Mapleton-Minto 81's vs. (N2) Elora Rocks =====
March 15	Elora Rocks	2 – 7	Mapleton-Minto 81's	Palmerston

March 21	Mapleton-Minto 81's	7 – 6	OT	Elora Rocks	Elora

March 22	Elora Rocks	5 – 6	OT	Mapleton-Minto 81's	Palmerston

March 28	Mapleton-Minto 81's	6 – 2	Elora Rocks	Elora

Mapleton-Minto wins series 4 – 0

===== (S1) Tillsonburg Thunder vs. (S3) Komoka Classics =====
March 15	Komoka Classics	9 – 4	Tillsonburg Thunder	Tillsonburg

March 19	Tillsonburg Thunder	3 – 2	Komoka Classics	Komoka

March 22	Komoka Classics	4 – 3	Tillsonburg Thunder	Tillsonburg

March 23	Tillsonburg Thunder	2 – 6	Komoka Classics	Komoka

March 29	Komoka Classics	6 – 1	Tillsonburg Thunder	Tillsonburg

Komoka wins series 4 – 1

==== WOAA Sr. AA Championship ====
===== (N1) Mapleton-Minto 81's vs. (S3) Komoka Classics =====
Note: Game three played in Mount Forest.

April 5	Komoka Classics	3 – 6	Mapleton-Minto 81's	Palmerston

April 6	Mapleton-Minto 81's	4 – 2	Komoka Classics	Komoka

April 11	Komoka Classics	7 – 2	Mapleton-Minto 81's	Palmerston

April 12	Mapleton-Minto 81's	2 – 5	Komoka Classics	Komoka

April 17	Komoka Classics	7 – 4	Mapleton-Minto 81's	Palmerston

April 19	Mapleton-Minto 81's	4 – 5	Komoka Classics	Komoka

Komoka wins series 4 – 2
