= 2009–10 WOAA Senior League season =

- League: WOAA Senior AA Hockey League
- Sport: Hockey
- Duration: Regular season October 2009 – January 2010; Playoffs; January 2010 – April 2010
- Teams: 19
- Finals champions: Sr. AA - Elora Rocks; Sr. A - Milverton Four Wheel Drives; Sr. B - Goderich Pirates

WOAA Senior League seasons
- 2008–09 2010–11

The 2009–10 WOAA Senior League season was the 20th season of the WOAA Senior AA Hockey League. The league played a 20-game regular season which began in October 2009 and concluded in January 2010. The post-season began in January 2010 and concluded in April 2010.

The Elora Rocks won the WOAA Senior AA Hockey Championship, defeating the Petrolia Squires in the final round of the playoffs.

== Team changes ==
- The Exeter Mohawks ceased operations during the off-season.
- The Nottawasaga River Rats ceased operations during the off-season.

== Regular season ==
=== Final standings ===
Note: GP = Games played; W = Wins; L= Losses; OTL = Overtime losses; GF = Goals for; GA = Goals against; Pts = Points; Green shade = Clinched playoff spot

Rank	North Division	GP	W	L	OTL	Pts	GF	GA
1	Elora Rocks	20	20	0	0	40	152	72
2	Shelburne Muskies	20	15	2	3	33	127	54
3	Saugeen Shores Winterhawks	20	12	5	3	27	112	86
4	Ripley Wolves	20	11	8	1	23	89	87
5	Durham Thundercats	20	11	8	1	23	101	107
6	Lucknow Lancers	20	9	10	1	19	101	98
7	Palmerston 81's	20	8	9	3	19	101	117
8	Shallow Lake Crushers	20	7	12	1	15	69	117
9	Walkerton Capitals	20	4	15	1	9	73	134
10	Drayton Icemen	20	3	15	2	8	78	132

Rank	South Division	GP	W	L	OTL	Pts	GF	GA
1	Tillsonburg Thunder	20	16	4	0	32	97	62
2	Petrolia Squires	20	14	5	1	29	109	78
3	Monkton Wildcats	20	14	5	1	29	80	60
4	Lucan-Ilderton Jets	20	10	9	1	21	93	81
5	Clinton Radars	20	8	10	2	18	74	86
6	Tavistock Royals	20	8	11	1	17	108	98
7	Milverton Four Wheel Drives	20	7	11	2	16	79	100
8	Thedford Dirty Dogs	20	7	13	0	14	74	105
9	Goderich Pirates	20	6	14	0	12	67	111

== Playoffs ==
=== WOAA Senior "AA" Hockey playoffs ===
Sr. AA qualifying
N1	Elora	3
N8	Shallow Lake	0
N4	Ripley	3
N5	Durham	2
N2	Shelburne	3
N7	Palmerston	0
N3	Saugeen Shores	3
N6	Lucknow	2
S1	Tillsonburg	3
S8	Thedford	0
S4	Lucan-Ilderton	3
S5	Clinton	1
S2	Petrolia	3
S7	Milverton	2
S3	Monkton	3
S6	Tavistock	0

Sr. AA quarter-finals
N1	Elora	4
N4	Ripley	2
N2	Shelburne	1
N3	Saugeen Shores	4
S1	Tillsonburg	3
S4	Lucan-Ilderton	4
S2	Petrolia	4
S3	Monkton	3

Sr. AA semi-finals
N1	Elora	4
N3	Saugeen Shores	0
S4	Lucan-Ilderton	3
S2	Petrolia	4

Sr. AA finals
N1	Elora	4
S2	Petrolia	2

==== WOAA Senior AA qualifying series ====
===== (N1) Elora Rocks vs. (N8) Shallow Lake Crushers =====
January 29	Shallow Lake Crushers	1 – 7	Elora Rocks	Elora

January 30	Elora Rocks	7 – 2	Shallow Lake Crushers	Shallow Lake

February 5	Shallow Lake Crushers	1 – 4	Elora Rocks	Elora

Elora wins series 3 – 0

===== (N2) Shelburne Muskies vs. (N7) Palmerston 81's =====
January 30	Palmerston 81's	3 – 6	Shelburne Muskies	Shelburne

February 5	Shelburne Muskies	5 – 2	Palmerston 81's	Palmerston

February 6	Palmerston 81's	3 – 4	Shelburne Muskies	Shelburne

Palmerston wins series 3 – 0

===== (N3) Saugeen Shores Winterhawks vs. (N6) Lucknow Lancers =====
January 29	Lucknow Lancers	3 – 1	Saugeen Shores Winterhawks	Saugeen Shores

January 30	Saugeen Shores Winterhawks	4 – 8	Lucknow Lancers	Lucknow

February 5	Lucknow Lancers	2 – 3	OT	Saugeen Shores Winterhawks	Saugeen Shores

February 6	Saugeen Shores Winterhawks	3 – 0	Lucknow Lancers	Lucknow

February 7	Lucknow Lancers	0 – 5	Saugeen Shores Winterhawks	Saugeen Shores

Saugeen Shores wins series 3 – 2

===== (N4) Ripley Wolves vs. (N5) Durham Thundercats =====
January 29	Durham Thundercats	3 – 7	Ripley Wolves	Ripley

January 31	Ripley Wolves	4 – 8	Durham Thundercats	Durham

February 5	Durham Thundercats	5 – 7	Ripley Wolves	Ripley

February 7	Ripley Wolves	1 – 2	OT	Durham Thundercats	Durham

February 9	Durham Thundercats	5 – 7	Ripley Wolves	Ripley

Ripley wins series 3 – 2

===== (S1) Tillsonburg Thunder vs. (S8) Thedford Dirty Dogs =====
January 30	Thedford Dirty Dogs	1 – 4	Tillsonburg Thunder	Tillsonburg

January 31	Tillsonburg Thunder	4 – 1	Thedford Dirty Dogs	Thedford

February 4	Thedford Dirty Dogs	3 – 11	Tillsonburg Thunder	Tillsonburg

Tillsonburg wins series 3 – 0

===== (S2) Petrolia Squires vs. (S7) Milverton Four Wheel Drives =====
January 29	Milverton Four Wheel Drives	4 – 6	Petrolia Squires	Petrolia

January 30	Petrolia Squires	1 – 2	Milverton Four Wheel Drives	Milverton

February 5	Milverton Four Wheel Drives	8 – 4	Petrolia Squires	Petrolia

February 7	Petrolia Squires	5 – 1	Milverton Four Wheel Drives	Milverton

February 9	Milverton Four Wheel Drives	2 – 8	Petrolia Squires	Petrolia

Petrolia wins series 3 – 2

===== (S3) Montkon Wildcats vs. (S6) Tavistock Royals =====
January 29	Tavistock Royals	3 – 6	Monkton Wildcats	Monkton

January 30	Monkton Wildcats	5 – 4	Tavistock Royals	Tavistock

February 5	Tavistock Royals	1 – 3	Monkton Wildcats	Monkton

Monkton wins series 3 – 0

===== (S4) Lucan-Ilderton Jets vs. (S5) Clinton Radars =====
January 30	Clinton Radars	5 – 4	Lucan-Ilderton Jets	Lucan

January 31	Lucan-Ilderton Jets	5 – 2	Clinton Radars	Clinton

February 6	Clinton Radars	0 – 4	Lucan-Ilderton Jets	Lucan

February 7	Lucan-Ilderton Jets	5 – 2	Clinton Radars	Clinton

Lucan-Ilderton wins series 3 – 1

==== WOAA Senior AA quarter-finals ====
===== (N1) Elora Rocks vs. (N4) Ripley Wolves =====
February 12	Ripley Wolves	3 – 4	Elora Rocks	Elora

February 13	Elora Rocks	6 – 7	OT	Ripley Wolves	Ripley

February 19	Elora Rocks	3 – 6	Ripley Wolves	Ripley

February 21	Ripley Wolves	0 – 11	Elora Rocks	Elora

February 26	Ripley Wolves	5 – 7	Elora Rocks	Elora

February 27	Elora Rocks	6 – 0	Ripley Wolves	Ripley

Elora wins series 4 – 2

===== (N2) Shelburne Muskies vs. (N3) Saugeen Shores Winterhawks =====
Note: Game five was played in Dundalk, Ontario.

February 13	Saugeen Shores Winterhawks	2 – 4	Shelburne Muskies	Shelburne

February 19	Shelburne Muskies	2 – 5	Saugeen Shores Winterhawks	Saugeen Shores

February 20	Saugeen Shores Winterhawks	5 – 3	Shelburne Muskies	Shelburne

February 26	Shelburne Muskies	3 – 5	Saugeen Shores Winterhawks	Saugeen Shores

February 27	Saugeen Shores Winterhawks	7 – 5	Shelburne Muskies	Shelburne

Saugeen Shores wins series 4 – 1

===== (S1) Tillsonburg Thunder vs. (S4) Lucan-Ilderton Jets =====
February 12	Tillsonburg Thunder	0 – 3	Lucan-Ilderton Jets	Lucan

February 13	Lucan-Ilderton Jets	4 – 3	OT	Tillsonburg Thunder	Tillsonburg

February 19	Tillsonburg Thunder	5 – 3	Lucan-Ilderton Jets	Lucan

February 20	Lucan-Ilderton Jets	2 – 0	Tillsonburg Thunder	Tillsonburg

February 24	Lucan-Ilderton Jets	5 – 6	Tillsonburg Thunder	Tillsonburg

February 27	Tillsonburg Thunder	8 – 2	Lucan-Ilderton Jets	Lucan

February 28	Lucan-Ilderton Jets	4 – 3	OT	Tillsonburg Thunder	Tillsonburg

Lucan-Ilderton wins series 4 – 3

===== (S2) Petrolia Squires vs. (S3) Monkton Wildcats =====
February 12	Monkton Wildcats	3 – 5	Petrolia Squires	Petrolia

February 13	Petrolia Squires	1 – 3	Monkton Wildcats	Monkton

February 19	Monkton Wildcats	2 – 1	Petrolia Squires	Petrolia

February 20	Petrolia Squires	5 – 4	Monkton Wildcats	Monkton

February 26	Monkton Wildcats	2 – 3	Petrolia Squires	Petrolia

February 27	Petrolia Squires	1 – 4	Monkton Wildcats	Monkton

March 2	Monkton Wildcats	4 – 5	Petrolia Squires	Petrolia

Petrolia wins series 4 – 3

==== WOAA Senior AA semi-finals ====
===== (N1) Elora Rocks vs. (N2) Saugeen Shores Winterhawks =====
March 5	Saugeen Shores Winterhawks	4 – 5	OT	Elora Rocks	Elora

March 6	Elora Rocks	5 – 1	Saugeen Shores Winterhawks	Saugeen Shores

March 12	Saugeen Shores Winterhawks	3 – 4	OT	Elora Rocks	Elora

March 13	Elora Rocks	4 – 3	Saugeen Shores Winterhawks	Saugeen Shores

Elora wins series 4 – 0

===== (S2) Petrolia Squires vs. (S4) Lucan-Ilderton Jets =====
March 5	Lucan-Ilderton Jets	3 – 4	Petrolia Squires	Petrolia

March 6	Petrolia Squires	5 – 7	Lucan-Ilderton Jets	Lucan

March 12	Lucan-Ilderton Jets	2 – 1	Petrolia Squires	Petrolia

March 13	Petrolia Squires	6 – 4	Lucan-Ilderton Jets	Lucan

March 19	Lucan-Ilderton Jets	4 – 1	Petrolia Squires	Petrolia

March 20	Petrolia Squires	9 – 5	Lucan-Ilderton Jets	Lucan

March 21	Lucan-Ilderton Jets	0 – 4	Petrolia Squires	Petrolia

Petrolia wins series 4 – 3

==== WOAA Sr. AA Championship ====
===== (N1) Elora Rocks vs. (S2) Petrolia Squires =====
March 26	Petrolia Squires	4 – 5	Elora Rocks	Elora

March 28	Elora Rocks	1 – 5	Petrolia Squires	Petrolia

April 2	Petrolia Squires	3 – 5	Elora Rocks	Elora

April 3	Elora Rocks	0 – 5	Petrolia Squires	Petrolia

April 9	Petrolia Squires	3 – 7	Elora Rocks	Elora

April 10	Elora Rocks	3 – 2	Petrolia Squires	Petrolia

Elora wins series 4 – 2

=== WOAA Senior "A" Hockey playoffs ===
The eight teams that lost in the "AA" qualifying playoff round participated in the "A" playoffs

Sr. A quarter-finals
N5	Durham	4
N8	Shallow Lake	3
N6	Lucknow	4
N7	Palmerston	0
S5	Clinton	2
S8	Thedford	4
S6	Tavistock	3
S7	Milverton	4

Sr. A semi-finals
N5	Durham	4
N6	Lucknow	3
S8	Thedford	3
S7	Milverton	4

Sr. A finals
N5	Durham	1
S7	Milverton	4

==== WOAA Senior A quarter-finals ====
===== (N5) Durham Thundercats vs. (N8) Shallow Lake Crushers =====
February 12	Shallow Lake Crushers	1 – 4	Durham Thundercats	Durham

February 13	Durham Thundercats	1 – 8	Shallow Lake Crushers	Shallow Lake

February 19	Shallow Lake Crushers	8 – 5	Durham Thundercats	Durham

February 20	Durham Thundercats	1 – 4	Shallow Lake Crushers	Shallow Lake

February 26	Shallow Lake Crushers	2 – 3	OT	Durham Thundercats	Durham

February 27	Durham Thundercats	7 – 3	Shallow Lake Crushers	Shallow Lake

March 2	Shallow Lake Crushers	3 – 4	Durham Thundercats	Durham

Durham wins series 4 – 3

===== (N6) Lucknow Lancers vs. (N7) Palmerston 81's =====
February 13	Palmerston 81's	6 – 8	Lucknow Lancers	Lucknow

February 14	Lucknow Lancers	7 – 3	Palmerston 81's	Palmerston

February 19	Palmerston 81's	4 – 7	Lucknow Lancers	Lucknow

February 20	Lucknow Lancers	9 – 3	Palmerston 81's	Palmerston

Lucknow wins series 4 – 0

===== (S5) Clinton Radars vs. (S8) Thedford Dirty Dogs =====
February 12	Thedford Dirty Dogs	6 – 5	OT	Clinton Radars	Clinton

February 13	Clinton Radars	7 – 6	Thedford Dirty Dogs	Thedford

February 19	Thedford Dirty Dogs	4 – 2	Clinton Radars	Clinton

February 20	Clinton Radars	2 – 1	Thedford Dirty Dogs	Thedford

February 26	Thedford Dirty Dogs	4 – 2	Clinton Radars	Clinton

February 27	Clinton Radars	6 – 11	Thedford Dirty Dogs	Thedford

Thedford wins series 4 – 2

===== (S6) Tavistock Royals vs. (S7) Milverton Four Wheel Drives =====
February 13	Milverton Four Wheel Drives	5 – 6	Tavistock Royals	Tavistock

February 19	Tavistock Royals	2 – 7	Milverton Four Wheel Drives	Milverton

February 20	Milverton Four Wheel Drives	2 – 3	Tavistock Royals	Tavistock

February 21	Tavistock Royals	4 – 7	Milverton Four Wheel Drives	Milverton

February 26	Milverton Four Wheel Drives	5 – 6	Tavistock Royals	Tavistock

February 27	Tavistock Royals	1 – 5	Milverton Four Wheel Drives	Milverton

March 2	Milverton Four Wheel Drives	8 – 6	Tavistock Royals	Tavistock

Milverton wins series 4 – 3

==== WOAA Senior A semi-finals ====
===== (N5) Durham Thundercats vs. (N6) Lucknow Lancers =====
March 5	Lucknow Lancers	8 – 3	Durham Thundercats	Durham

March 6	Durham Thundercats	1 – 5	Lucknow Lancers	Lucknow

March 12	Lucknow Lancers	5 – 2	Durham Thundercats	Durham

March 13	Durham Thundercats	5 – 1	Lucknow Lancers	Lucknow

March 19	Lucknow Lancers	5 – 8	Durham Thundercats	Durham

March 20	Durham Thundercats	6 – 3	Lucknow Lancers	Lucknow

March 21	Lucknow Lancers	3 – 6	Durham Thundercats	Durham

Durham wins series 4 – 3

===== (S7) Milverton Four Wheel Drives vs. (S8) Thedford Dirty Dogs =====
March 6	Milverton Four Wheel Drives	3 – 5	Thedford Dirty Dogs	Thedford

March 7	Thedford Dirty Dogs	3 – 6	Milverton Four Wheel Drives	Milverton

March 12	Thedford Dirty Dogs	3 – 9	Milverton Four Wheel Drives	Milverton

March 13	Milverton Four Wheel Drives	1 – 6	Thedford Dirty Dogs	Thedford

March 19	Thedford Dirty Dogs	4 – 3	OT	Milverton Four Wheel Drives	Milverton

March 20	Milverton Four Wheel Drives	3 – 2	Thedford Dirty Dogs	Thedford

March 21	Thedford Dirty Dogs	2 – 5	Milverton Four Wheel Drives	Milverton

Milverton wins series 4 – 3

==== WOAA Sr. A Championship ====
===== (N5) Durham Thundercats vs. (S7) Milverton Four Wheel Drives =====
March 26	Milverton Four Wheel Drives	9 – 7	Durham Thundercats	Durham

March 27	Durham Thundercats	6 – 5	Milverton Four Wheel Drives	Milverton

April 1	Milverton Four Wheel Drives	5 – 4	Durham Thundercats	Durham

April 3	Durham Thundercats	3 – 8	Milverton Four Wheel Drives	Milverton

April 10	Milverton Four Wheel Drives	7 – 3	Durham Thundercats	Durham

Milverton wins series 4 – 1

=== WOAA Senior "B" Hockey playoffs ===
The bottom three teams in the league standings did not qualify for the Senior AA playoff qualifying round and played in the Senior B playoffs.

==== WOAA Senior B semi-finals ====
===== Round robin =====
The top two teams in the round robin qualify for the WOAA Sr. "B" finals.

Rank	Round robin	GP	W	L	Pts	GF	GA
1	Goderich Pirates	4	4	0	8	23	11
2	Drayton Icemen	4	2	2	4	13	16
3	Walkerton Capitals	4	0	4	0	15	24

==== WOAA Senior B finals ====
===== (S9) Goderich Pirates vs. (N10) Drayton Icemen =====
February 26	Drayton Icemen	3 – 4	Goderich Pirates	Goderich

March 5	Drayton Icemen	3 – 4	OT	Goderich Pirates	Goderich

March 7	Goderich Pirates	4 – 5	Drayton Icemen	Drayton

March 12	Goderich Pirates	9 – 7	Drayton Icemen	Drayton

March 19	Drayton Icemen	3 – 4	Goderich Pirates	Goderich

Goderich wins series 4 – 1
