= 2014–15 WOAA Senior League season =

- League: WOAA Senior AA Hockey League
- Sport: Hockey
- Duration: Regular season October 2014 – January 2015; Playoffs; February 2015 – April 2015
- Teams: 14
- Finals champions: Sr. AA - Tillsonburg Thunder; Sr. A - Ripley Wolves

WOAA Senior League seasons
- 2013–14 2015–16

The 2014–15 WOAA Senior League season was the 25th season of the WOAA Senior AA Hockey League. The league played a 24-game regular season which began in October 2014 and concluded in January 2015. The post-season began in February 2015 and concluded in April 2015.

The Tillsonburg Thunder won the WOAA Senior AA Hockey Championship, defeating the Mapleton-Minto 81's in the final round of the playoffs.

== Team changes ==
- The Komoka Classics, the defending WOAA Sr. AA champions, folded over the summer.
- The Monkton Wildcats folded over the summer.
- The Goderich Pirates relocated to Seaforth, Ontario and were renamed the Huron East Centenaires.

== Regular season ==
=== Final standings ===
Note: GP = Games played; W = Wins; L= Losses; OTL = Overtime losses; GF = Goals for; GA = Goals against; Pts = Points; Green shade = Clinched playoff spot

Rank	North Division	GP	W	L	OTL	Pts	GF	GA
1	Durham Thundercats	24	18	4	2	38	117	65
2	Saugeen Shores Winterhawks	24	18	5	1	37	132	82
3	Mapleton-Minto 81's	24	17	7	0	34	108	61
4	Elora Rocks	24	16	8	0	32	147	93
5	Shallow Lake Crushers	24	10	13	1	21	99	115
6	Ripley Wolves	24	10	13	1	21	102	121
7	Shelburne Muskies	24	4	19	1	9	49	138
8	Lucknow Lancers	24	3	19	2	8	76	155

Rank	South Division	GP	W	L	OTL	Pts	GF	GA
1	Tillsonburg Thunder	24	18	5	1	39	152	92
2	Tavistock Royals	24	17	5	2	36	151	96
3	Petrolia Squires	24	16	7	1	33	114	95
4	Clinton Radars	24	15	7	2	32	128	92
5	Milverton Four Wheel Drives	24	5	15	4	14	101	151
6	Huron East Centenaires	24	1	22	1	3	68	188

=== Scoring leaders ===
Note: GP = Games played; G = Goals; A = Assists; Pts = Points; PIM = Penalty minutes

Player	Team	GP	G	A	Pts	PIM
Bryan Kazarian	Saugeen Shores Winterhawks	24	18	36	54	32
Jeremy Machin	Elora Rocks	23	17	27	44	16
Brock Zinken	Elora Rocks	22	21	22	43	36
Tyler Townsend	Tavistock Royals	24	16	26	42	8
Mike Findlater	Tillsonburg Thunder	20	22	16	38	8
Ryan Murphy	Clinton Radars	21	16	22	38	69
Brad Kraus	Elora Rocks	19	21	16	37	61
Andrew Coburn	Mapleton-Minto 81's	23	18	19	37	46
Sean Consitt	Clinton Radars	22	19	15	34	18
Cody Britton	Ripley Wolves	24	16	18	34	18

== Playoffs ==
=== WOAA Senior "AA" Hockey playoffs ===
The top eight teams qualify for the WOAA Senior "AA" Hockey playoffs. Each series is a best-of-seven.

Division semi-finals
N1	Durham	2
N4	Elora	4
N2	Saugeen Shores	2
N3	Mapleton-Minto	4
S1	Tillsonburg	4
S4	Clinton	0
S2	Tavistock	4
S3	Petrolia	2

Division finals
N4	Elora	0
N3	Mapleton-Minto	4
S1	Tillsonburg	4
S3	Tavistock	2

WOAA Sr. AA finals
N1	Mapleton-Minto	1
S1	Tillsonburg	4

==== WOAA Senior AA divisional semi-finals ====
===== (N1) Durham Thundercats vs. (N4) Elora Rocks =====
February 7	Elora Rocks	1 – 4	Durham Thundercats	Durham

February 8	Durham Thundercats	7 – 5	Elora Rocks	Elora

February 13	Elora Rocks	4 – 3	Durham Thundercats	Durham

February 15	Durham Thundercats	4 – 5	Elora Rocks	Elora

February 20	Elora Rocks	7 – 5	Durham Thundercats	Durham

February 21	Durham Thundercats	5 – 9	Elora Rocks	Elora

Elora wins series 4 – 2

===== (N2) Saugeen Shores Winterhawks vs. (N3) Mapleton-Minto 81's =====
February 6	Mapleton-Minto 81's	3 – 4	OT	Saugeen Shores Winterhawks	Saugeen Shores

February 7	Saugeen Shores Winterhawks	0 – 3	Mapleton-Minto 81's	Palmerston

February 13	Mapleton-Minto 81's	4 – 6	Saugeen Shores Winterhawks	Saugeen Shores

February 15	Saugeen Shores Winterhawks	2 – 5	Mapleton-Minto 81's	Palmerston

February 20	Mapleton-Minto 81's	4 – 1	Saugeen Shores Winterhawks	Saugeen Shores

February 22	Saugeen Shores Winterhawks	2 – 3	Mapleton-Minto 81's	Palmerston

Mapleton-Minto wins series 4 – 2

===== (S1) Tillsonburg Thunder vs. (S4) Clinton Radars =====
February 7	Clinton Radars	2 – 3	OT	Tillsonburg Thunder	Tillsonburg

February 13	Tillsonburg Thunder	3 – 2	Clinton Radars	Clinton

February 16	Clinton Radars	2 – 4	Tillsonburg Thunder	Tillsonburg

February 20	Tillsonburg Thunder	5 – 3	Clinton Radars	Clinton

Tillsonburg wins series 4 – 0

===== (S2) Tavistock Royals vs. (S3) Petrolia Squires =====
February 8	Petrolia Squires	0 – 3	Tavistock Royals	Tavistock

February 13	Tavistock Royals	7 – 4	Petrolia Squires	Petrolia

February 15	Tavistock Royals	6 – 5	2OT	Petrolia Squires	Petrolia

February 18	Petrolia Squires	2 – 0	Tavistock Royals	Tavistock

February 20	Petrolia Squires	7 – 3	Tavistock Royals	Tavistock

February 22	Tavistock Royals	5 – 1	Petrolia Squires	Petrolia

Tavistock wins series 4 – 2

==== WOAA Senior AA divisional finals ====
===== (N3) Mapleton-Minto 81's vs. (N4) Elora Rocks =====
Note: Game three played in Drayton.

February 27	Elora Rocks	3 – 6	Mapleton-Minto 81's	Palmerston

March 1	Mapleton-Minto 81's	8 – 5	Elora Rocks	Elora

March 6	Elora Rocks	1 – 5	Mapleton-Minto 81's	Palmerston

March 8	Mapleton-Minto 81's	3 – 1	Elora Rocks	Elora

Mapleton-Minto wins series 4 – 0

===== (S1) Tillsonburg Thunder vs. (S2) Tavistock Royals =====
February 28	Tavistock Royals	3 – 2	OT	Tillsonburg Thunder	Tillsonburg

March 1	Tillsonburg Thunder	6 – 4	Tavistock Royals	Tavistock

March 7	Tavistock Royals	2 – 5	Tillsonburg Thunder	Tillsonburg

March 8	Tillsonburg Thunder	2 – 4	Tavistock Royals	Tavistock

March 14	Tavistock Royals	0 – 4	Tillsonburg Thunder	Tillsonburg

March 15	Tillsonburg Thunder	6 – 1	Tavistock Royals	Tavistock

Tillsonburg wins series 4 – 2

==== WOAA Sr. AA Championship ====
===== (S1) Tillsonburg Thunder vs. (N3) Mapleton-Minto 81's =====
March 21	Mapleton-Minto 81's	3 – 6	Tillsonburg Thunder	Tillsonburg

March 27	Tillsonburg Thunder	4 – 6	Mapleton-Minto 81's	Palmerston

March 28	Mapleton-Minto 81's	1 – 4	Tillsonburg Thunder	Tillsonburg

April 3	Tillsonburg Thunder	4 – 3	Mapleton-Minto 81's	Palmerston

April 4	Mapleton-Minto 81's	1 – 5	Tillsonburg Thunder	Tillsonburg

Tillsonburg wins series 4 – 1

=== WOAA Senior "A" Hockey playoffs ===
The bottom six teams qualified for the WOAA Senior "A" Hockey playoffs.

==== Round robin ====
The top four teams in the round robin qualify for the WOAA Sr. "A" semi-finals.

Rank	Round robin	GP	W	L	Pts	GF	GA
1	Ripley Wolves	5	4	1	8	34	25
2	Milverton Four Wheel Drives	5	3	2	6	29	26
3	Shallow Lake Crushers	5	3	2	6	32	21
4	Lucknow Lancers	5	2	3	4	30	32
5	Huron East Centenaires	5	2	3	4	26	38
6	Shelburne Muskies	5	1	4	2	20	29

==== Playoff bracket ====
WOAA Sr. A semi-finals
N5	Shallow Lake	4
N8	Lucknow	1
N6	Ripley	4
S5	Milverton	3

WOAA Sr. A finals
N5	Shallow Lake	3
N6	Ripley	4

==== WOAA Senior A semi-finals ====
===== (N5) Shallow Lake Crushers vs. (N8) Lucknow Lancers =====
March 8	Shallow Lake Crushers	2 – 4	Lucknow Lancers	Lucknow

March 11	Lucknow Lancers	3 – 6	Shallow Lake Crushers	Shallow Lake

March 13	Lucknow Lancers	6 – 7	OT	Shallow Lake Crushers	Shallow Lake

March 14	Shallow Lake Crushers	7 – 3	Lucknow Lancers	Lucknow

March 20	Lucknow Lancers	5 – 6	Shallow Lake Crushers	Shallow Lake

Shallow Lake wins series 4 – 1

===== (N6) Ripley Wolves vs. (S5) Milverton Four Wheel Drives =====
March 6	Milverton Four Wheel Drives	2 – 4	Ripley Wolves	Ripley

March 8	Ripley Wolves	4 – 6	Milverton Four Wheel Drives	Milverton

March 13	Milverton Four Wheel Drives	4 – 6	Ripley Wolves	Ripley

March 14	Ripley Wolves	1 – 8	Milverton Four Wheel Drives	Milverton

March 20	Milverton Four Wheel Drives	4 – 3	Ripley Wolves	Ripley

March 22	Ripley Wolves	5 – 2	Milverton Four Wheel Drives	Milverton

March 24	Milverton Four Wheel Drives	2 – 5	Ripley Wolves	Ripley

Ripley wins series 4 – 3

==== WOAA Senior A finals ====
===== (N5) Shallow Lake Crushers vs. (N6) Ripley Wolves =====
- Note: Game 1 was played in Shallow Lake

March 27	Ripley Wolves	4 – 6	Shallow Lake Crushers	Owen Sound

March 28	Shallow Lake Crushers	2 – 6	Ripley Wolves	Ripley

April 3	Ripley Wolves	3 – 5	Shallow Lake Crushers	Owen Sound

April 4	Shallow Lake Crushers	6 – 4	Ripley Wolves	Ripley

April 10	Ripley Wolves	3 – 2	OT	Shallow Lake Crushers	Owen Sound

April 11	Shallow Lake Crushers	1 – 7	Ripley Wolves	Ripley

April 12	Ripley Wolves	5 – 0	Shallow Lake Crushers	Owen Sound

Ripley wins series 4 – 3
