= 2011–12 WOAA Senior League season =

- League: WOAA Senior AA Hockey League
- Sport: Hockey
- Duration: Regular season October 2011 – January 2012; Playoffs; February 2012 – April 2012
- Teams: 18
- Finals champions: Sr. AA - Saugeen Shores Winterhawks

WOAA Senior League seasons
- 2010–11 2012–13

The 2011–12 WOAA Senior League season was the 22nd season of the WOAA Senior AA Hockey League. The league played a 24-game regular season which began in October 2011 and concluded in January 2012. The post-season began in February 2012 and concluded in April 2012.

The Saugeen Shores Winterhawks won the WOAA Senior AA Hockey Championship, defeating the Tavistock Royals in the final round of the playoffs. The Winterhawks completed the post-season with a perfect 16–0 record en route to the championship.

== Team changes ==
- The Drayton Icemen and Palmerston 81's merge and become the Mapleton-Minto 81's. The team will play home games in Drayton, Harriston and Palmerston.
- The Lucan-Ilderton Jets relocate to Komoka and are renamed the Komoka Classics.

== Regular season ==
=== Final standings ===
Note: GP = Games played; W = Wins; L= Losses; OTL = Overtime losses; GF = Goals for; GA = Goals against; Pts = Points; Green shade = Clinched playoff spot

| Rank | North Division | GP | W | L | OTL | Pts | GF | GA |
|---|---|---|---|---|---|---|---|---|
| 1 | Saugeen Shores Winterhawks | 24 | 23 | 1 | 0 | 46 | 151 | 58 |
| 2 | Elora Rocks | 24 | 17 | 4 | 3 | 37 | 144 | 92 |
| 3 | Shelburne Muskies | 24 | 16 | 6 | 2 | 34 | 125 | 88 |
| 4 | Durham Thundercats | 24 | 15 | 5 | 4 | 34 | 113 | 102 |
| 5 | Mapleton-Minto 81's | 24 | 11 | 10 | 3 | 25 | 96 | 111 |
| 6 | Ripley Wolves | 24 | 11 | 11 | 2 | 24 | 98 | 100 |
| 7 | Shallow Lake Crushers | 24 | 9 | 13 | 2 | 20 | 99 | 136 |
| 8 | Lucknow Lancers | 24 | 4 | 18 | 2 | 10 | 74 | 124 |
| 9 | Walkerton Capitals | 24 | 2 | 20 | 2 | 6 | 67 | 156 |

| Rank | South Division | GP | W | L | OTL | Pts | GF | GA |
|---|---|---|---|---|---|---|---|---|
| 1 | Tavistock Royals | 24 | 20 | 3 | 1 | 41 | 134 | 74 |
| 2 | Tillsonburg Thunder | 24 | 16 | 7 | 1 | 33 | 125 | 91 |
| 3 | Clinton Radars | 24 | 15 | 8 | 1 | 31 | 100 | 94 |
| 4 | Komoka Classics | 24 | 15 | 8 | 1 | 31 | 128 | 95 |
| 5 | Petrolia Squires | 24 | 14 | 10 | 0 | 28 | 122 | 102 |
| 6 | Milverton Four Wheel Drives | 24 | 11 | 11 | 2 | 24 | 119 | 119 |
| 7 | Monkton Wildcats | 24 | 8 | 16 | 0 | 16 | 69 | 86 |
| 8 | Goderich Pirates | 24 | 5 | 16 | 3 | 13 | 94 | 161 |
| 9 | Thedford Dirty Dogs | 24 | 4 | 19 | 1 | 9 | 78 | 147 |

=== Scoring leaders ===
Note: GP = Games played; G = Goals; A = Assists; Pts = Points; PIM = Penalty minutes

| Player | Team | GP | G | A | Pts | PIM |
|---|---|---|---|---|---|---|
| Tristan Fairbarn | Shelburne Muskies | 24 | 32 | 19 | 51 | 22 |
| Jeremy Machin | Elora Rocks | 22 | 19 | 30 | 49 | 16 |
| Deryk Whitehead | Komoka Classics | 22 | 14 | 32 | 46 | 20 |
| Kevin Galerno | Tillsonburg Thunder | 19 | 21 | 23 | 44 | 6 |
| Tyler Townsend | Tavistock Royals | 23 | 19 | 21 | 40 | 22 |
| Blake Underwood | Saugeen Shores Winterhawks | 21 | 16 | 23 | 39 | 4 |
| Tyler Doig | Clinton Radars | 23 | 14 | 24 | 38 | 61 |
| Sean Thompson | Shelburne Muskies | 21 | 14 | 23 | 37 | 64 |
| Chad Swartzentruber | Tavistock Royals | 23 | 5 | 32 | 37 | 66 |
| Joel Petkoff | Durham Thundercats | 19 | 24 | 12 | 36 | 30 |

== Playoffs ==
=== WOAA Senior "AA" Hockey playoffs ===
Divisional quarter-finals
N1 | Saugeen Shores | 4
N8 | Lucknow | 0
N4 | Durham | 4
N5 | Mapleton-Minto | 1
N2 | Elora | 4
N7 | Shallow Lake | 1
N3 | Shelburne | 4
N6 | Ripley | 2
S1 | Tavistock | 4
S8 | Goderich | 0
S4 | Komoka | 1
S5 | Petrolia | 4
S2 | Tillsonburg | 4
S7 | Monkton | 0
S3 | Clinton | 4
S6 | Milverton | 0

Divisional semi-finals
N1 | Saugeen Shores | 4
N4 | Durham | 0
N2 | Elora | 4
N3 | Shelburne | 2
S1 | Tavistock | 4
S5 | Petrolia | 1
S2 | Tillsonburg | 4
S3 | Clinton | 0

Divisional finals
N1 | Saugeen Shores | 4
N2 | Elora | 0
S1 | Tavistock | 4
S2 | Tillsonburg | 1

WOAA Sr. AA finals
N1 | Saugeen Shores | 4
S1 | Tavistock | 0

==== WOAA Senior AA divisional quarter-finals ====
===== (N1) Saugeen Shores Winterhawks vs. (N8) Lucknow Lancers =====
| February 3 | Saugeen Shores Winterhawks | 7 – 1 | Lucknow Lancers | Lucknow |

| February 4 | Lucknow Lancers | 0 – 3 | Saugeen Shores Winterhawks | Saugeen Shores |

| February 10 | Lucknow Lancers | 2 – 11 | Saugeen Shores Winterhawks | Saugeen Shores |

| February 11 | Saugeen Shores Winterhawks | 8 – 1 | Lucknow Lancers | Lucknow |

| Saugeen Shores wins series 4 – 0 |

===== (N2) Elora Rocks vs. (N7) Shallow Lake Crushers =====
Note: Game five was played in Fergus, Ontario.

| February 3 | Shallow Lake Crushers | 6 – 3 | Elora Rocks | Elora |

| February 4 | Elora Rocks | 8 – 1 | Shallow Lake Crushers | Shallow Lake |

| February 10 | Shallow Lake Crushers | 2 – 3 | OT | Elora Rocks | Elora |

| February 11 | Elora Rocks | 3 – 0 | Shallow Lake Crushers | Shallow Lake |

| February 17 | Shallow Lake Crushers | 4 – 7 | Elora Rocks | Elora |

| Elora wins series 4 – 1 |

===== (N3) Shelburne Muskies vs. (N6) Ripley Wolves =====
| February 3 | Shelburne Muskies | 3 – 4 | OT | Ripley Wolves | Ripley |

| February 4 | Ripley Wolves | 4 – 0 | Shelburne Muskies | Shelburne |

| February 10 | Ripley Wolves | 3 – 6 | Shelburne Muskies | Shelburne |

| February 11 | Shelburne Muskies | 4 – 1 | Ripley Wolves | Ripley |

| February 18 | Ripley Wolves | 4 – 5 | OT | Shelburne Muskies | Shelburne |

| February 19 | Shelburne Muskies | 6 – 5 | OT | Ripley Wolves | Ripley |

| Shelburne wins series 4 – 2 |

===== (N4) Durham Thundercats vs. (N5) Mapleton-Minto 81's =====
| February 3 | Durham Thundercats | 5 – 1 | Mapleton-Minto 81's | Palmerston |

| February 8 | Mapleton-Minto 81's | 3 – 6 | Durham Thundercats | Durham |

| February 10 | Mapleton-Minto 81's | 4 – 3 | Durham Thundercats | Durham |

| February 12 | Durham Thundercats | 4 – 3 | Mapleton-Minto 81's | Palmerston |

| February 17 | Mapleton-Minto 81's | 4 – 5 | Durham Thundercats | Durham |

| Durham wins series 4 – 1 |

===== (S1) Tavistock Royals vs. (S8) Goderich Pirates =====
| February 3 | Tavistock Royals | 9 – 3 | Goderich Pirates | Goderich |

| February 4 | Goderich Pirates | 1 – 9 | Tavistock Royals | Tavistock |

| February 10 | Tavistock Royals | 6 – 3 | Goderich Pirates | Goderich |

| February 11 | Goderich Pirates | 4 – 5 | Tavistock Royals | Tavistock |

| Tavistock wins series 4 – 0 |

===== (S2) Tillsonburg Thunder vs. (S7) Monkton Wildcats =====
| February 3 | Monkton Wildcats | 2 – 6 | Tillsonburg Thunder | Tillsonburg |

| February 4 | Tillsonburg Thunder | 3 – 0 | Monkton Wildcats | Monkton |

| February 7 | Monkton Wildcats | 1 – 5 | Tillsonburg Thunder | Tillsonburg |

| February 10 | Tillsonburg Thunder | 6 – 3 | Monkton Wildcats | Monkton |

| Tillsonburg wins series 4 – 0 |

===== (S3) Clinton Radars vs. (S6) Milverton Four Wheel Drives =====
| February 3 | Milverton Four Wheel Drives | 3 – 7 | Clinton Radars | Clinton |

| February 5 | Clinton Radars | 4 – 3 | Milverton Four Wheel Drives | Milverton |

| February 10 | Milverton Four Wheel Drives | 1 – 8 | Clinton Radars | Clinton |

| February 12 | Clinton Radars | 4 – 2 | Milverton Four Wheel Drives | Milverton |

| Clinton wins series 4 – 0 |

===== (S4) Komoka Classics vs. (S5) Petrolia Squires =====
| February 4 | Petrolia Squires | 3 – 2 | Komoka Classics | Komoka |

| February 10 | Komoka Classics | 4 – 5 | Petrolia Squires | Petrolia |

| February 11 | Petrolia Squires | 3 – 2 | Komoka Classics | Komoka |

| February 17 | Komoka Classics | 4 – 2 | Petrolia Squires | Petrolia |

| February 18 | Petrolia Squires | 4 – 2 | Komoka Classics | Komoka |

| Petrolia wins series 4 – 1 |

==== WOAA Senior AA divisional semi-finals ====
===== (N1) Saugeen Shores Winterhawks vs. (N4) Durham Thundercats =====
| February 24 | Durham Thundercats | 0 – 7 | Saugeen Shores Winterhawks | Saugeen Shores |

| February 29 | Saugeen Shores Winterhawks | 7 – 1 | Durham Thundercats | Durham |

| March 2 | Durham Thundercats | 0 – 7 | Saugeen Shores Winterhawks | Saugeen Shores |

| March 9 | Saugeen Shores Winterhawks | 7 – 4 | Durham Thundercats | Durham |

| Saugeen Shores wins series 4 – 0 |

===== (N2) Elora Rocks vs. (N3) Shelburne Muskies =====
| February 24 | Shelburne Muskies | 2 – 3 | OT | Elora Rocks | Elora |

| February 25 | Elora Rocks | 3 – 7 | Shelburne Muskies | Shelburne |

| March 2 | Shelburne Muskies | 3 – 6 | Elora Rocks | Elora |

| March 9 | Shelburne Muskies | 4 – 5 | OT | Elora Rocks | Elora |

| March 10 | Elora Rocks | 2 – 6 | Shelburne Muskies | Shelburne |

| March 11 | Shelburne Muskies | 1 – 3 | Elora Rocks | Elora |

| Elora wins series 4 – 2 |

===== (S1) Tavistock Royals vs. (S5) Petrolia Squires =====
| February 24 | Tavistock Royals | 2 – 1 | OT | Petrolia Squires | Petrolia |

| February 25 | Petrolia Squires | 3 – 4 | Tavistock Royals | Tavistock |

| March 2 | Tavistock Royals | 3 – 5 | Petrolia Squires | Petrolia |

| March 3 | Petrolia Squires | 1 – 2 | OT | Tavistock Royals | Tavistock |

| March 7 | Petrolia Squires | 4 – 8 | Tavistock Royals | Tavistock |

| Tavistock wins series 4 – 1 |

===== (S2) Tillsonburg Thunder vs. (S3) Clinton Radars =====
| February 24 | Tillsonburg Thunder | 3 – 2 | Clinton Radars | Clinton |

| February 25 | Clinton Radars | 3 – 6 | Tillsonburg Thunder | Tillsonburg |

| February 28 | Clinton Radars | 3 – 4 | Tillsonburg Thunder | Tillsonburg |

| March 2 | Tillsonburg Thunder | 5 – 3 | Clinton Radars | Clinton |

| Tillsonburg wins series 4 – 0 |

==== WOAA Senior AA divisional finals ====
===== (N1) Saugeen Shores Winterhawks vs. (N2) Elora Rocks =====
| March 16 | Elora Rocks | 4 – 5 | OT | Saugeen Shores Winterhawks | Saugeen Shores |

| March 18 | Saugeen Shores Winterhawks | 9 – 4 | Elora Rocks | Elora |

| March 23 | Elora Rocks | 2 – 7 | Saugeen Shores Winterhawks | Saugeen Shores |

| March 25 | Saugeen Shores Winterhawks | 5 – 4 | OT | Elora Rocks | Elora |

| Saugeen Shores wins series 4 – 0 |

===== (S1) Tavistock Royals vs. (S3) Tillsonburg Thunder =====
| March 16 | Tillsonburg Thunder | 2 – 4 | Tavistock Royals | Tavistock |

| March 20 | Tavistock Royals | 4 – 3 | OT | Tillsonburg Thunder | Tillsonburg |

| March 24 | Tillsonburg Thunder | 5 – 3 | Tavistock Royals | Tavistock |

| March 27 | Tavistock Royals | 4 – 2 | Tillsonburg Thunder | Tillsonburg |

| March 28 | Tillsonburg Thunder | 1 – 4 | Tavistock Royals | Tavistock |

| Tavistock wins series 4 – 1 |

==== WOAA Sr. AA Championship ====
===== (N1) Saugeen Shores Winterhawks vs. (S1) Tavistock Royals =====
| April 6 | Tavistock Royals | 4 – 5 | Saugeen Shores Winterhawks | Saugeen Shores |

| April 7 | Saugeen Shores Winterhawks | 3 – 2 | OT | Tavistock Royals | Tavistock |

| April 13 | Tavistock Royals | 3 – 5 | Saugeen Shores Winterhawks | Saugeen Shores |

| April 15 | Saugeen Shores Winterhawks | 6 – 5 | OT | Tavistock Royals | Tavistock |

| Saugeen Shores wins series 4 – 0 |
