= 2016–17 WOAA Senior League season =

- League: WOAA Senior AA Hockey League
- Sport: Hockey
- Duration: Regular season October 2016 – January 2017; Playoffs; February 2017 – March 2017
- Teams: 14
- Finals champions: Sr. AA - Clinton Radars; Sr. A - Milverton Four Wheel Drives

WOAA Senior League seasons
- 2015–16 2017–18

The 2016–17 WOAA Senior League season was the 27th season of the WOAA Senior AA Hockey League. The league played a 20-game regular season which began in October 2016 and concluded in January 2017. The post-season began in February 2017 and concluded in March 2017.

The Clinton Radars won the WOAA Senior AA Hockey Championship, defeating the Durham Thundercats in the final round of the playoffs.

== Team changes ==
- The Elora Rocks, who suspended operations early in the 2015–16 season, returned to the league.
- The WOAA realigned and went from two divisional standings into only one league standing.

== Regular season ==
=== Final standings ===
Note: GP = Games played; W = Wins; L= Losses; OTL = Overtime losses; GF = Goals for; GA = Goals against; Pts = Points; Green shade = Clinched playoff spot

Rank	WOAA Senior League	GP	W	L	OTL	Pts	GF	GA
1	Saugeen Shores Winterhawks	20	18	1	1	37	114	42
2	Mapleton-Minto 81's	20	16	4	0	32	102	59
3	Petrolia Squires	20	13	6	1	27	91	71
4	Clinton Radars	20	12	6	2	26	110	65
5	Tavistock Royals	20	11	7	2	24	115	98
6	Ripley Wolves	20	11	7	2	24	81	79
7	Tillsonburg Thunder	20	11	8	1	23	95	76
8	Durham Thundercats	20	11	8	1	23	105	98
9	Huron East Centenaires	20	10	10	0	20	72	81
10	Milverton Four Wheel Drives	20	8	12	0	16	87	120
11	Shelburne Muskies	20	7	11	2	16	74	93
12	Shallow Lake Crushers	20	6	13	1	13	68	108
13	Lucknow Lancers	20	3	14	3	9	51	115
14	Elora Rocks	20	3	17	0	6	81	141

=== Scoring leaders ===
Note: GP = Games played; G = Goals; A = Assists; Pts = Points; PIM = Penalty minutes

Player	Team	GP	G	A	Pts	PIM
Brent Freeman	Milverton Four Wheel Drives	19	14	30	44	16
Dennis Dewar	Milverton Four Wheel Drives	18	22	20	42	10
Kurtis Bartliff	Clinton Radars	19	20	20	40	4
Cohen Adair	Milverton Four Wheel Drives	15	19	20	39	10
Randy Cox	Durham Thundercats	16	12	26	38	0
Andrew Coburn	Mapleton-Minto 81's	16	22	15	37	14
Brett Catto	Ripley Wolves	19	12	22	34	30
Kraig Wright	Petrolia Squires	18	15	18	33	31
Cody Britton	Ripley Wolves	20	15	18	33	4
Zach Graham	Mapleton-Minto 81's	17	11	20	31	24

== Playoffs ==
=== WOAA Senior "AA" Hockey playoffs ===
The top eight teams qualify for the WOAA Senior "AA" Hockey playoffs. Each series is a best-of-seven.

WOAA Sr. AA quarter-finals
1	Saugeen Shores	4
8	Durham	1
4	Clinton	4
5	Tavistock	2
2	Mapleton-Minto	4
7	Tillsonburg	3
3	Petrolia	4
6	Ripley	1

WOAA Sr. AA semi-finals
1	Saugeen Shores	2
4	Clinton	4
2	Mapleton-Minto	2
3	Petrolia	4

WOAA Sr. AA finals
4	Clinton	4
3	Petrolia	2

==== WOAA Senior AA quarter-finals ====
===== (1) Saugeen Shores Winterhawks vs. (8) Durham Thundercats =====
February 3	Durham Thundercats	4 – 6	Saugeen Shores Winterhawks	Saugeen Shores

February 10	Saugeen Shores Winterhawks	5 – 3	Durham Thundercats	Durham

February 11	Durham Thundercats	4 – 2	Saugeen Shores Winterhawks	Saugeen Shores

February 12	Saugeen Shores Winterhawks	4 – 1	Durham Thundercats	Durham

February 17	Durham Thundercats	5 – 6	OT	Saugeen Shores Winterhawks	Saugeen Shores

Saugeen Shores wins series 4 – 1

===== (2) Mapleton-Minto 81's vs. (7) Tillsonburg Thunder =====
February 4	Mapleton-Minto 81's	4 – 3	OT	Tillsonburg Thunder	Tillsonburg

February 5	Tillsonburg Thunder	3 – 4	OT	Mapleton-Minto 81's	Palmerston

February 10	Tillsonburg Thunder	4 – 3	Mapleton-Minto 81's	Palmerston

February 11	Mapleton-Minto 81's	2 – 8	Tillsonburg Thunder	Tillsonburg

February 17	Tillsonburg Thunder	4 – 0	Mapleton-Minto 81's	Palmerston

February 18	Mapleton-Minto 81's	4 – 3	Tillsonburg Thunder	Tillsonburg

February 20	Tillsonburg Thunder	2 – 6	Mapleton-Minto 81's	Palmerston

Mapleton-Minto wins series 4 – 3

===== (3) Petrolia Squires vs. (6) Ripley Wolves =====
February 3	Ripley Wolves	4 – 9	Petrolia Squires	Petrolia

February 4	Petrolia Squires	6 – 7	Ripley Wolves	Ripley

February 10	Ripley Wolves	3 – 7	Petrolia Squires	Petrolia

February 12	Petrolia Squires	3 – 1	Ripley Wolves	Ripley

February 17	Ripley Wolves	4 – 6	Petrolia Squires	Petrolia

Petrolia wins series 4 – 1

===== (4) Clinton Radars vs. (5) Tavistock Royals =====
February 3	Tavistock Royals	2 – 5	Clinton Radars	Clinton

February 4	Clinton Radars	7 – 8	OT	Tavistock Royals	Tavistock

February 10	Tavistock Royals	1 – 4	Clinton Radars	Clinton

February 11	Clinton Radars	5 – 6	OT	Tavistock Royals	Tavistock

February 17	Tavistock Royals	1 – 4	Clinton Radars	Clinton

February 18	Clinton Radars	7 – 0	Tavistock Royals	Tavistock

Clinton wins series 4 – 2

==== WOAA Senior AA semi-finals ====
===== (1) Saugeen Shores Winterhawks vs. (4) Clinton Radars =====
February 24	Clinton Radars	3 – 6	Saugeen Shores Winterhawks	Saugeen Shores

February 25	Saugeen Shores Winterhawks	1 – 4	Clinton Radars	Clinton

March 3	Clinton Radars	4 – 5	Saugeen Shores Winterhawks	Saugeen Shores

March 4	Saugeen Shores Winterhawks	2 – 5	Clinton Radars	Clinton

March 10	Clinton Radars	3 – 2	Saugeen Shores Winterhawks	Saugeen Shores

March 11	Saugeen Shores Winterhawks	1 – 2	Clinton Radars	Clinton

Clinton wins series 4 – 2

===== (2) Mapleton-Minto 81's vs. (3) Petrolia Squires =====
Note: Game five was played in Drayton.

February 24	Petrolia Squires	5 – 2	Mapleton-Minto 81's	Palmerston

February 26	Mapleton-Minto 81's	3 – 2	Petrolia Squires	Petrolia

March 3	Petrolia Squires	7 – 4	Mapleton-Minto 81's	Palmerston

March 5	Mapleton-Minto 81's	7 – 3	Petrolia Squires	Petrolia

March 10	Petrolia Squires	2 – 1	OT	Mapleton-Minto 81's	Palmerston

March 11	Mapleton-Minto 81's	1 – 9	Petrolia Squires	Petrolia

Petrolia wins series 4 – 2

==== WOAA Sr. AA Championship ====
===== (3) Petrolia Squires vs. (4) Clinton Radars =====
March 17	Clinton Radars	1 – 2	Petrolia Squires	Petrolia

March 18	Petrolia Squires	3 – 4	OT	Clinton Radars	Clinton

March 24	Clinton Radars	1 – 3	Petrolia Squires	Petrolia

March 25	Petrolia Squires	3 – 7	Clinton Radars	Clinton

March 26	Clinton Radars	5 – 4	OT	Petrolia Squires	Petrolia

March 31	Petrolia Squires	0 – 4	Clinton Radars	Clinton

Clinton wins series 4 – 2

=== WOAA Senior "A" Hockey playoffs ===
The bottom six teams qualified for the WOAA Senior "A" Hockey playoffs.

WOAA Sr. A quarter-finals
9	Huron East	bye
11	Shelburne	1
14	Elora	2
10	Milverton	bye
12	Shallow Lake	2
13	Lucknow	1

WOAA Sr. A semi-finals
9	Huron East	4
14	Elora	0
10	Milverton	4
11	Shallow Lake	0

WOAA Sr. A finals
9	Huron East	3
10	Milverton	4

==== WOAA Senior A quarter-finals ====
===== (11) Shelburne Muskies vs. (14) Elora Rocks =====
February 3	Elora Rocks	4 – 5	Shelburne Muskies	Shelburne

February 4	Shelburne Muskies	2 – 5	Elora Rocks	Elora

February 6	Elora Rocks	4 – 3	OT	Shelburne Muskies	Shelburne

Elora wins series 2 – 1

===== (12) Shallow Lake Crushers vs. (13) Lucknow Lancers =====
February 3	Lucknow Lancers	3 – 5	Shallow Lake Crushers	Shallow Lake

February 4	Shallow Lake Crushers	1 – 3	Lucknow Lancers	Lucknow

February 7	Lucknow Lancers	2 – 3	2OT	Shallow Lake Crushers	Shallow Lake

Shallow Lake wins series 2 – 1

==== WOAA Senior A semi-finals ====
===== (9) Huron East Centenaires vs. (14) Elora Rocks =====
February 12	Elora Rocks	5 – 6	Huron East Centenaires	Seaforth

February 17	Huron East Centenaires	8 – 7	OT	Elora Rocks	Elora

February 18	Elora Rocks	4 – 10	Huron East Centenaires	Seaforth

February 24	Huron East Centenaires	6 – 4	Elora Rocks	Elora

Huron East wins series 4 – 0

===== (10) Milverton Four Wheel Drives vs. (11) Shallow Lake Crushers =====
February 10	Shallow Lake Crushers	2 – 9	Milverton Four Wheel Drives	Milverton

February 11	Milverton Four Wheel Drives	9 – 3	Shallow Lake Crushers	Shallow Lake

February 17	Milverton Four Wheel Drives	7 – 6	OT	Shallow Lake Crushers	Shallow Lake

February 18	Shallow Lake Crushers	3 – 9	Milverton Four Wheel Drives	Milverton

Milverton wins series 4 – 0

==== WOAA Senior A finals ====
===== (9) Huron East Centenaires vs. (10) Milverton Four Wheel Drives =====
March 4	Milverton Four Wheel Drives	3 – 8	Huron East Centenaires	Seaforth

March 5	Huron East Centenaires	9 – 8	OT	Milverton Four Wheel Drives	Milverton

March 10	Huron East Centenaires	3 – 5	Milverton Four Wheel Drives	Milverton

March 11	Milverton Four Wheel Drives	2 – 3	Huron East Centenaires	Seaforth

March 18	Milverton Four Wheel Drives	6 – 5	OT	Huron East Centenaires	Seaforth

March 19	Huron East Centenaires	1 – 5	Milverton Four Wheel Drives	Milverton

March 25	Milverton Four Wheel Drives	10 – 5	Huron East Centenaires	Seaforth

Milverton wins series 4 – 3
