= Thedford Dirty Dogs =

- City: Thedford, Ontario
- League: WOAA Senior Hockey League
- Division: South
- Founded: 2006
- Folded: 2013
- Home arena: Thedford Bosanquet Community Centre
- Colours: Maroon, Yellow, and White

The Thedford Dirty Dogs were a senior hockey team based out of Thedford, Ontario, Canada. They played three seasons in the WOAA Senior Hockey League.

== 2006-07 season ==
On October 7, 2006, the Thedford Dirty Dogs began their first season in the WOAA with a 10-2 loss to the Hensall Sherwoods at the Thedford Bosanquet Community Centre. Two weeks later on October 21, the Dirty Dogs played in their first road game, an 8-4 loss in Hensall. On November 11, Thedford earned their first point of the season, as they lost to the Wingham Bulls 7-6 in overtime in a game in Wingham. The Dirty Dogs finished the regular season still looking for their first win, as they wound up with a 0-23-1 record, ending up in ninth place in the nine team South Division.

In the playoffs, they faced off against the Monkton Wildcats, and after dropping the opening game in their best of three series, the Dirty Dogs rebounded and registered their first win in franchise history by a 2-1 score in Thedford. The Dogs kept the third game close, but fell to the Wildcats 3-2, and lost the series two games to one, ending their season.

== 2007-08 season ==
It was another long, winless season for Thedford, as they saw their regular season losing streak reach 50 games, as the Dirty Dogs went 0-26-0, finishing in last place in the ten team South Division.

The Dirty Dogs played the Goderich Pirates in a best of three qualifying series, with the winner advancing to the "A" playoffs. The Dirty Dogs upset the Pirates in the series opener, with a 4-2 victory, however, Goderich tied it up with a 4-1 win in game two. The Pirates completed the comeback, defeating Thedford 7-1 in the third and deciding game, ending the Dirty Dogs season.

== 2008-09 season ==
The Dirty Dogs winless streak continued through the season, as Thedford had a 0-20-0 record, finishing in last place in the ten team WOAA South Division. The Dirty Dogs regular season losing streak reached 70 games.

Thedford qualified for the "B" playoffs, and faced the Milverton Four Wheel Drives in the best of seven semi-finals. Milverton finished the season in ninth place in the South, with a 4-16-0 record. The Dirty Dogs kept the series opener close, however, they found themselves on the wrong side of a 5-4 score. In the second game, Thedford took a 3-2 lead going into the third period, however, Milverton fought back to tie the game at three to send it into overtime. The Four Wheel Drives completed the comeback with a 4-3 victory, putting Thedford down by two games. Milverton then blew out the Dirty Dogs in the third game by an 8-2 victory, putting Thedford on the brink of elimination. In the fourth game, the Dirty Dogs took a 2-1 lead going into the third period, however, Milverton again came back from behind, defeating Thedford 3-2 and sweeping the Dirty Dogs out of the post-season.

== 2009-10 season ==
Thedford opened the 2009-10 season up with two losses, which extended their losing streak to 72 games, however, on October 10, Thedford finally ended their drought, defeating the Milverton Four Wheel Drives 4-3 in front of their home fans to earn their first ever regular season victory in team history. The Dirty Dogs had their most successful regular season to date, finishing with a 7-13-0 record, earning 14 points, and an eighth-place finish in the WOAA South Division.

The Dirty Dogs faced the Tillsonburg Thunder in a best of five series, with the winner advancing to the "AA" playoffs. The Thunder finished the season with the best record in the South Division at 16-4-0. Tillsonburg opened the series with a 4-1 victory, followed by another 4-1 win in the second game to take a 2-0 series lead. The Dirty Dogs were unable to fight off elimination in the third game, as the Thunder crushed Thedford 11-3 to send the Dirty Dogs to the "A" playoffs.

Thedford faced off against the Clinton Radars in the best of seven "A" quarter-finals. The Dirty Dogs took the first game, defeating Clinton 6-5 in overtime, however, the Radars evened the series in the second game, defeating Thedford 7-6. The Dirty Dogs retook the series lead in the third game, as Thedford defeated Clinton 4-2, however, the Radars once again tied the series up, as they defeated the Dirty Dogs 2-1 in the fourth game. Thedford once again took the series lead, as the Dirty Dogs defeated Clinton 4-2 in the fifth game to take a 3-2 lead. In the sixth game, the Dirty Dogs completed the upset, defeating the Radars 11-6 to advance to the semi-finals.

The Dirty Dogs next opponent was the Milverton Four Wheel Drives, and Thedford took the series opener by a 5-3 score. Milverton stormed back in the next two games, easily defeating the Dirty Dogs 6-3 and then 9-3 to take a 2-1 series lead. Thedford evened up the series in the fourth game, defeating the Drives 6-1. In the fifth game, Thedford stunned Milverton with a 4-3 overtime win, taking a 3-2 series lead. Milverton responded in the sixth game, holding off the Dirty Dogs by a 3-2 score, setting up a seventh and deciding game. After Thedford took a 1-0 lead in the first period, Milverton scored twice in the second period to go up by a 2-1 score. In the final minutes of the third period, Milverton scored again, going up 3-1, however, the Dirty Dogs scored shortly after, cutting the Drives lead to 3-2. Milverton, though, scored once again, taking a 4-2 lead, followed by an empty net goal to make the final score 5-2 for the Four Wheel Drives, eliminating Thedford from the playoffs.

== 2010-11 season ==
Thedford had its second straight seven win season in 2010-11, tying the team record for wins set the previous season, as the team went 7-17-2, earning 16 points. The Dirty Dogs finished in seventh place in the South Division.

== Season-by-Season record ==
Note: GP = Games played, W = Wins, L = Losses, OTL = Overtime Losses, Pts = Points, GF = Goals for, GA = Goals against

Season	GP	W	L	T	OTL	GF	GA	PTS	Finish	Playoffs
2006–07	24	0	23	-	1	57	220	1	9th South	Lost "A" qualifying round (1-2 vs. Wildcats)
2007–08	26	0	26	-	0	68	205	0	10th South	Lost "A" qualifying round (1-2 vs. Pirates)
2008–09	20	0	20	-	0	57	176	0	10th South	Lost "B" semi-Finals (0-4 vs. Drives)
2009–10	20	7	13	-	0	74	105	14	8th South	Lost "AA" qualifying round (0-3 vs. Thunder); Won "A" quarter-finals (4-2 vs. Radars); Lost "A" semi-finals (3-4 vs. Drives)
2010–11	26	7	17	-	2	86	135	16	7th South	Lost "AA" qualifying round (1-4 vs. Wildcats)
2011–12	24	4	19	-	1	78	147	9	9th South	Did not qualify
2012–13	24	4	20	-	0	70	178	8	8th South	Lost divisional quarter-finals (0-4 vs. Classics); Lost Sr. "A" quarter-finals (0-2 vs. Lancers)

== See also ==
- Thedford, Ontario
- Western Ontario Athletic Association
- WOAA Senior Hockey League
