= 2017–18 WOAA Senior League season =

- League: WOAA Senior AA Hockey League
- Sport: Hockey
- Duration: Regular season October 2017 – January 2018; Playoffs; February 2018 – March 2018
- Teams: 13
- Finals champions: Sr. AA - Clinton Radars; Sr. A - Petrolia Squires

WOAA Senior League seasons
- 2016–17 2018–19

The 2017–18 WOAA Senior League season was the 28th season of the WOAA Senior AA Hockey League. The league played a 20-game regular season which began in October 2017 and concluded in January 2018. The post-season began in February 2018 and concluded in March 2018.

The Clinton Radars won the WOAA Senior AA Hockey Championship, defeating the Durham Thundercats in the final round of the playoffs.

== Team changes ==
- The Mapleton-Minto 81's took a leave of absence for the 2017–18 season.

== Regular season ==
=== Petrolia Squires unsigned player ===
On January 19, 2018, the Petrolia Squires were penalized by the Western Ontario Athletic Association, for allegedly using an unsigned player. The WOAA has stripped the Squires of victories over Huron East, Lucknow and Milverton, and the loss of six points in the standings eliminates Petrolia from the Senior AA playoffs. Squires’ President Dave Connors tweeted Friday that the veteran player's card was missed when the cards were signed, scanned and e-mailed to the WOAA office prior to the start of the season.

=== Final standings ===
Note: GP = Games played; W = Wins; L= Losses; OTL = Overtime losses; GF = Goals for; GA = Goals against; Pts = Points; Green shade = Clinched playoff spot

Rank	WOAA Senior League	GP	W	L	OTL	Pts	GF	GA
1	Clinton Radars	20	20	0	0	40	137	39
2	Ripley Wolves	20	17	3	0	34	93	60
3	Durham Thundercats	20	16	4	0	32	115	57
4	Tillsonburg Thunder	20	14	3	3	31	113	73
5	Shelburne Muskies	20	11	9	0	22	85	79
6	Saugeen Shores Winterhawks	20	10	9	1	21	99	57
7	Milverton Four Wheel Drives	20	9	11	0	18	71	100
8	Huron East Centenaires	20	7	10	3	17	88	110
9	Petrolia Squires	20	7	13	0	14	90	73
10	Tavistock Royals	20	7	13	0	14	78	109
11	Shallow Lake Crushers	20	7	13	0	14	58	118
12	Lucknow Lancers	20	3	15	2	8	44	121
13	Elora Rocks	20	2	15	3	7	49	124

=== Scoring leaders ===
Note: GP = Games played; G = Goals; A = Assists; Pts = Points; PIM = Penalty minutes

Player	Team	GP	G	A	Pts	PIM
Kurtis Bartliff	Clinton Radars	19	19	19	38	6
Brent Walton	Ripley Wolves	12	19	17	36	6
Luke Vick	Clinton Radars	19	15	21	36	22
Quinten Bruce	Durham Thundercats	19	16	19	35	18
Stephen Sanza	Clinton Radars	20	12	21	33	6
Brett Catto	Ripley Wolves	19	8	22	30	41
Cody Britton	Ripley Wolves	20	16	13	29	8
Kyler Nixon	Durham Thundercats	20	14	15	29	20
Max Campbell	Clinton Radars	17	10	19	29	20
Miles MacLean	Saugeen Shores Winterhawks	15	11	17	28	4

== Playoffs ==
=== WOAA Senior "AA" Hockey playoffs ===
The top eight teams qualify for the WOAA Senior "AA" Hockey playoffs. Each series is a best-of-seven.

WOAA Sr. AA quarter-finals
1	Clinton	4
8	Huron East	0
4	Tillsonburg	4
5	Shelburne	0
2	Ripley	4
7	Milverton	1
3	Durham	4
6	Saugeen Shores	0

WOAA Sr. AA semi-finals
1	Clinton	4
4	Tillsonburg	2
2	Ripley	1
3	Durham	4

WOAA Sr. AA finals
1	Clinton	4
3	Durham	0

==== WOAA Senior AA quarter-finals ====
===== (1) Clinton Radars vs. (8) Huron East Centenaires =====
February 2	Huron East Centenaires	2 – 5	Clinton Radars	Central Huron Community Complex

February 3	Clinton Radars	6 – 3	Huron East Centenaires	Seaforth Community Centre

February 9	Clinton Radars	5 – 4	OT	Huron East Centenaires	Seaforth Community Centre

February 10	Huron East Centenaires	4 – 11	Clinton Radars	Central Huron Community Complex

Clinton wins series 4 – 0

===== (2) Ripley Wolves vs. (7) Milverton Four Wheel Drives =====
February 3	Milverton Four Wheel Drives	5 – 6	OT	Ripley Wolves	Ripley-Huron Arena

February 4	Ripley Wolves	6 – 1	Milverton Four Wheel Drives	Perth East Recreational Complex

February 9	Milverton Four Wheel Drives	6 – 5	OT	Ripley Wolves	Ripley-Huron Arena

February 10	Ripley Wolves	6 – 4	Milverton Four Wheel Drives	Perth East Recreational Complex

February 17	Milverton Four Wheel Drives	3 – 6	Ripley Wolves	Ripley-Huron Arena

Ripley wins series 4 – 1

===== (3) Durham Thundercats vs. (6) Saugeen Shores Winterhawks =====
February 2	Saugeen Shores Winterhawks	4 – 5	Durham Thundercats	Durham Community Centre

February 3	Durham Thundercats	4 – 3	Saugeen Shores Winterhawks	Port Elgin Plex

February 9	Saugeen Shores Winterhawks	1 – 4	Durham Thundercats	Durham Community Centre

February 10	Durham Thundercats	6 – 5	OT	Saugeen Shores Winterhawks	Port Elgin Plex

Durham wins series 4 – 0

===== (4) Tillsonburg Thunder vs. (5) Shelburne Muskies =====
February 3	Shelburne Muskies	3 – 5	Tillsonburg Thunder	Colin Campbell Community Arena

February 9	Tillsonburg Thunder	6 – 3	Shelburne Muskies	Centre Dufferin Recreation Complex

February 10	Shelburne Muskies	2 – 7	Tillsonburg Thunder	Colin Campbell Community Arena

February 16	Tillsonburg Thunder	8 – 3	Shelburne Muskies	Centre Dufferin Recreation Complex

Tillsonburg wins series 4 – 0

==== WOAA Senior AA semi-finals ====
===== (1) Clinton Radars vs. (4) Tillsonburg Thunder =====
February 23	Tillsonburg Thunder	5 – 3	Clinton Radars	Central Huron Community Complex

February 24	Clinton Radars	4 – 1	Tillsonburg Thunder	Colin Campbell Community Arena

March 2	Tillsonburg Thunder	3 – 0	Clinton Radars	Central Huron Community Complex

March 3	Clinton Radars	6 – 1	Tillsonburg Thunder	Colin Campbell Community Arena

March 9	Tillsonburg Thunder	0 – 6	Clinton Radars	Central Huron Community Complex

March 10	Clinton Radars	5 – 0	Tillsonburg Thunder	Colin Campbell Community Arena

Clinton wins series 4 – 2

===== (2) Ripley Wolves vs. (3) Durham Thundercats =====
February 23	Durham Thundercats	5 – 0	Ripley Wolves	Ripley-Huron Arena

February 25	Ripley Wolves	0 – 5	Durham Thundercats	Durham Community Centre

March 2	Durham Thundercats	0 – 4	Ripley Wolves	Ripley-Huron Arena

March 3	Ripley Wolves	3 – 6	Durham Thundercats	Durham Community Centre

March 10	Ripley Wolves	5 – 4	Durham Thundercats	Durham Community Centre

Durham wins series 4 – 1

==== WOAA Sr. AA Championship ====
===== (1) Clinton Radars vs. (3) Durham Thundercats =====
March 16	Durham Thundercats	2 – 3	Clinton Radars	Central Huron Community Complex

March 17	Clinton Radars	6 – 4	Durham Thundercats	Durham Community Centre

March 23	Durham Thundercats	4 – 7	Clinton Radars	Central Huron Community Complex

March 24	Clinton Radars	4 – 3	OT	Durham Thundercats	Durham Community Centre

Clinton wins series 4 – 0

=== WOAA Senior "A" Hockey playoffs ===
The bottom five teams qualified for the WOAA Senior "A" Hockey playoffs.

WOAA Sr. A quarter-finals
9	Petrolia	bye
12	Lucknow	2
13	Elora	1
10	Tavistock	bye
11	Shallow Lake	bye

WOAA Sr. A semi-finals
9	Petrolia	4
12	Lucknow	1
10	Tavistock	4
11	Shallow Lake	1

WOAA Sr. A finals
9	Petrolia	4
10	Tavistock	1

==== WOAA Senior A quarter-finals ====
===== (12) Lucknow Lancers vs. (13) Elora Rocks =====
February 3	Elora Rocks	5 – 4	OT	Lucknow Lancers	Lucknow Arena

February 4	Lucknow Lancers	3 – 1	Elora Rocks	Elora Community Centre

February 6	Elora Rocks	2 – 4	Lucknow Lancers	Lucknow Arena

Lucknow wins series 2 – 1

==== WOAA Senior A semi-finals ====
===== (9) Petrolia Squires vs. (12) Lucknow Lancers =====
February 10	Petrolia Squires	2 – 6	Lucknow Lancers	Lucknow Arena

February 16	Lucknow Lancers	6 – 8	Petrolia Squires	Greenwood Recreation Centre

February 17	Petrolia Squires	10 – 3	Lucknow Lancers	Lucknow Arena

February 18	Lucknow Lancers	3 – 10	Petrolia Squires	Greenwood Recreation Centre

February 23	Lucknow Lancers	0 – 4	Petrolia Squires	Greenwood Recreation Centre

Petrolia wins series 4 – 1

===== (10) Tavistock Royals vs. (11) Shallow Lake Crushers =====
February 10	Shallow Lake Crushers	2 – 6	Tavistock Royals	Tavistock Recreation Centre

February 11	Tavistock Royals	4 – 2	Shallow Lake Crushers	Shallow Lake Arena

February 16	Shallow Lake Crushers	2 – 1	Tavistock Royals	Tavistock Recreation Centre

February 17	Tavistock Royals	8 – 3	Shallow Lake Crushers	Shallow Lake Arena

February 24	Shallow Lake Crushers	3 – 6	Tavistock Royals	Tavistock Recreation Centre

Tavistock wins series 4 – 1

==== WOAA Senior A finals ====
===== (9) Petrolia Squires vs. (10) Tavistock Royals =====
March 2	Tavistock Royals	3 – 6	Petrolia Squires	Greenwood Recreation Centre

March 4	Petrolia Squires	2 – 3	Tavistock Royals	Tavistock Recreation Centre

March 9	Tavistock Royals	3 – 6	Petrolia Squires	Greenwood Recreation Centre

March 11	Petrolia Squires	4 – 3	OT	Tavistock Royals	Tavistock Recreation Centre

March 16	Tavistock Royals	2 – 3	OT	Petrolia Squires	Greenwood Recreation Centre

Petrolia wins series 4 – 1
