= 2018–19 WOAA Senior League season =

- League: WOAA Senior AA Hockey League
- Sport: Hockey
- Duration: Regular season October 2018 – January 2019; Playoffs; February 2019 – April 2019
- Teams: 14
- Finals champions: Sr. AA - Clinton Radars; Sr. A - Milverton Four Wheel Drives

WOAA Senior League seasons
- 2017–18 2019–20

The 2018–19 WOAA Senior League season was the 29th season of the WOAA Senior AA Hockey League. The league played a 22-game regular season which began in October 2018 and concluded in January 2019. The post-season began in February 2019 and concluded in April 2019.

The Clinton Radars won the WOAA Senior AA Hockey Championship, defeating the Ripley Wolves in the final round of the playoffs.

== Team changes ==
- The Mapleton-Minto 81's return to the league after a one-year leave of absence.

== Regular season ==
=== Final standings ===
Note: GP = Games played; W = Wins; L= Losses; OTL = Overtime losses; GF = Goals for; GA = Goals against; Pts = Points; Green shade = Clinched playoff spot

Rank	WOAA Senior League	GP	W	L	OTL	Pts	GF	GA
1	Clinton Radars	22	20	1	1	41	171	61
2	Ripley Wolves	22	19	2	1	39	133	59
3	Durham Thundercats	22	14	5	3	31	145	99
4	Saugeen Shores Winterhawks	22	14	7	1	29	103	74
5	Mapleton-Minto 81's	22	12	7	3	27	109	91
6	Petrolia Squires	22	12	8	2	26	93	96
7	Huron East Centenaires	22	12	9	1	25	125	124
8	Tavistock Royals	22	12	9	1	25	99	89
9	Tillsonburg Thunder	22	11	11	0	22	100	104
10	Shelburne Muskies	22	11	11	0	22	101	88
11	Elora Rocks	22	9	12	1	19	77	102
12	Milverton Four Wheel Drives	22	3	17	2	8	78	147
13	Shallow Lake Crushers	22	3	19	0	6	65	169
14	Lucknow Lancers	22	2	20	0	4	58	154

=== Scoring leaders ===
Note: GP = Games played; G = Goals; A = Assists; Pts = Points; PIM = Penalty minutes

Player	Team	GP	G	A	Pts	PIM
Stephen Sanza	Clinton Radars	21	23	36	59	22
Max Campbell	Clinton Radars	19	17	35	52	14
Kurtis Bartliff	Clinton Radars	18	24	21	45	2
Rob Van Wynsberghe	Huron East Centenaires	19	27	18	45	33
Kyler Nixon	Durham Thundercats	21	16	29	45	12
Garrett Meurs	Ripley Wolves	21	25	19	44	30
Jake Brown	Durham Thundercats	17	23	19	42	14
Brent Freeman	Milverton Four Wheel Drives	22	24	17	41	4
Zach Graham	Clinton Radars	19	10	29	39	6
Justin Graham (#22)	Durham Thundercats	20	13	26	39	22

== Playoffs ==
=== WOAA Senior "AA" Hockey playoffs ===
The top eight teams qualify for the WOAA Senior "AA" Hockey playoffs. Each series is a best-of-seven.

WOAA Sr. AA quarter-finals
1	Clinton	4
8	Tavistock	0
4	Saugeen Shores	4
5	Mapleton-Minto	1
2	Ripley	4
7	Huron East	0
3	Durham	4
6	Petrolia	0

WOAA Sr. AA semi-finals
1	Clinton	4
4	Saugeen Shores	2
2	Ripley	4
3	Durham	2

WOAA Sr. AA finals
1	Clinton	4
2	Ripley	1

==== WOAA Senior AA quarter-finals ====
===== (1) Clinton Radars vs. (8) Tavistock Royals =====
February 8	Tavistock Royals	3 – 10	Clinton Radars	Central Huron Community Complex

February 9	Clinton Radars	6 – 5	OT	Tavistock Royals	Tavistock Recreation Centre

February 15	Tavistock Royals	4 – 7	Clinton Radars	Central Huron Community Complex

February 16	Clinton Radars	9 – 6	Tavistock Royals	Tavistock Recreation Centre

Clinton wins series 4 – 0

===== (2) Ripley Wolves vs. (7) Huron East Centenaires =====
Note: Game two was played at the Davidson Centre in Kincardine, Ontario.

February 8	Ripley Wolves	3 – 0	Huron East Centenaires	Seaforth Community Centre

February 9	Huron East Centenaires	5 – 6	Ripley Wolves	Ripley-Huron Arena

February 10	Huron East Centenaires	1 – 4	Ripley Wolves	Ripley-Huron Arena

February 15	Ripley Wolves	5 – 2	Huron East Centenaires	Seaforth Community Centre

Ripley wins series 4 – 0

===== (3) Durham Thundercats vs. (6) Petrolia Squires =====
February 9	Petrolia Squires	6 – 9	Durham Thundercats	Durham Community Centre

February 10	Durham Thundercats	6 – 2	Petrolia Squires	Greenwood Recreation Centre

February 15	Petrolia Squires	6 – 7	Durham Thundercats	Durham Community Centre

February 17	Durham Thundercats	4 – 3	OT	Petrolia Squires	Greenwood Recreation Centre

Durham wins series 4 – 0

===== (4) Saugeen Shores Winterhawks vs. (5) Mapleton-Minto 81's =====
February 10	Saugeen Shores Winterhawks	6 – 2	Mapleton-Minto 81's	Palmerston Community Centre

February 15	Mapleton-Minto 81's	2 – 3	OT	Saugeen Shores Winterhawks	Port Elgin Plex

February 17	Saugeen Shores Winterhawks	4 – 5	Mapleton-Minto 81's	Palmerston Community Centre

February 19	Mapleton-Minto 81's	2 – 3	OT	Saugeen Shores Winterhawks	Port Elgin Plex

February 22	Mapleton-Minto 81's	5 – 6	Saugeen Shores Winterhawks	Port Elgin Plex

Saugeen Shores wins series 4 – 1

==== WOAA Senior AA semi-finals ====
===== (1) Clinton Radars vs. (4) Saugeen Shores Winterhawks =====
March 1	Saugeen Shores Winterhawks	2 – 5	Clinton Radars	Central Huron Community Complex

March 2	Clinton Radars	1 – 4	Saugeen Shores Winterhawks	Port Elgin Plex

March 8	Saugeen Shores Winterhawks	2 – 1	Clinton Radars	Central Huron Community Complex

March 10	Clinton Radars	6 – 0	Saugeen Shores Winterhawks	Port Elgin Plex

March 15	Saugeen Shores Winterhawks	2 – 5	Clinton Radars	Central Huron Community Complex

March 16	Clinton Radars	3 – 1	Saugeen Shores Winterhawks	Port Elgin Plex

Clinton wins series 4 – 2

===== (2) Ripley Wolves vs. (3) Durham Thundercats =====
March 2	Durham Thundercats	2 – 6	Ripley Wolves	Ripley-Huron Arena

March 3	Ripley Wolves	5 – 6	OT	Durham Thundercats	Durham Community Centre

March 9	Ripley Wolves	2 – 3	Durham Thundercats	Durham Community Centre

March 10	Durham Thundercats	3 – 6	Ripley Wolves	Ripley-Huron Arena

March 15	Durham Thundercats	4 – 7	Ripley Wolves	Ripley-Huron Arena

March 16	Ripley Wolves	7 – 3	Durham Thundercats	Durham Community Centre

Ripley wins series 4 – 2

==== WOAA Sr. AA Championship ====
===== (1) Clinton Radars vs. (2) Ripley Wolves =====
March 23	Clinton Radars	5 – 4	OT	Ripley Wolves	Ripley-Huron Arena

March 24	Ripley Wolves	0 – 3	Clinton Radars	Central Huron Community Complex

March 29	Ripley Wolves	7 – 2	Clinton Radars	Central Huron Community Complex

March 31	Clinton Radars	5 – 2	Ripley Wolves	Ripley-Huron Arena

April 5	Ripley Wolves	0 – 4	Clinton Radars	Central Huron Community Complex

Clinton wins series 4 – 1

=== WOAA Senior "A" Hockey playoffs ===
The bottom six teams qualified for the WOAA Senior "A" Hockey playoffs.

WOAA Sr. A quarter-finals
9	Tillsonburg	bye
12	Milverton	2
13	Shallow Lake	0
10	Shelburne	bye
11	Elora	2
14	Lucknow	0

WOAA Sr. A semi-finals
9	Tillsonburg	2
12	Milverton	4
10	Shelburne	1
11	Elora	4

WOAA Sr. A finals
12	Milverton	4
11	Elora	2

==== WOAA Senior A quarter-finals ====
===== (11) Elora Rocks vs. (14) Lucknow Lancers =====
February 1	Lucknow Lancers	1 – 7	Elora Rocks	Elora Community Centre

February 2	Elora Rocks	6 – 2	Lucknow Lancers	Lucknow Arena

Elora wins series 2 – 0

===== (12) Milverton Four Wheel Drives vs. (13) Shallow Lake Crushers =====
February 1	Milverton Four Wheel Drives	5 – 4	Shallow Lake Crushers	Shallow Lake Arena

February 3	Shallow Lake Crushers	5 – 9	Milverton Four Wheel Drives	Perth East Recreation Complex

Milverton wins series 2 – 0

==== WOAA Senior A semi-finals ====
===== (9) Tillsonburg Thunder vs. (12) Milverton Four Wheel Drives =====
February 9	Milverton Four Wheel Drives	8 – 5	Tillsonburg Thunder	Colin Campbell Community Arena

February 15	Tillsonburg Thunder	2 – 3	OT	Milverton Four Wheel Drives	Perth East Recreation Complex

February 18	Milverton Four Wheel Drives	1 – 6	Tillsonburg Thunder	Colin Campbell Community Arena

February 18	Tillsonburg Thunder	9 – 5	Milverton Four Wheel Drives	Perth East Recreation Complex

February 23	Milverton Four Wheel Drives	4 – 3	Tillsonburg Thunder	Colin Campbell Community Arena

February 24	Tillsonburg Thunder	2 – 5	Milverton Four Wheel Drives	Perth East Recreation Complex

Milverton wins series 4 – 2

===== (10) Shelburne Muskies vs. (11) Elora Rocks =====
February 9	Elora Rocks	3 – 4	OT	Shelburne Muskies	Centre Dufferin Recreation Complex

February 15	Shelburne Muskies	2 – 5	Elora Rocks	Elora Community Centre

February 16	Elora Rocks	5 – 1	Shelburne Muskies	Centre Dufferin Recreation Complex

February 22	Shelburne Muskies	3 – 4	Elora Rocks	Elora Community Centre

February 23	Elora Rocks	6 – 4	Shelburne Muskies	Centre Dufferin Recreation Complex

Elora wins series 4 – 1

==== WOAA Senior A finals ====
===== (11) Elora Rocks vs. (12) Milverton Four Wheel Drives =====
March 1	Milverton Four Wheel Drives	3 – 4	OT	Elora Rocks	Elora Community Centre

March 3	Elora Rocks	2 – 3	OT	Milverton Four Wheel Drives	Perth East Recreation Complex

March 8	Milverton Four Wheel Drives	4 – 6	Elora Rocks	Elora Community Centre

March 9	Elora Rocks	2 – 6	Milverton Four Wheel Drives	Perth East Recreation Complex

March 15	Milverton Four Wheel Drives	3 – 1	Elora Rocks	Elora Community Centre

March 16	Elora Rocks	1 – 7	Milverton Four Wheel Drives	Perth East Recreation Complex

Milverton wins series 4 – 2
