= Ripley Wolves =

- City: Ripley, Ontario
- League: Ontario Elite Hockey League
- Division: North
- Home arena: Ripley-Huron Complex
- Colours: Green, Black, and White
- General manager: Mike Howes; Corey McCrae
- Head coach: Dustin Catto
- Website: ripleywolves.com

The Ripley Wolves are a senior hockey team based out of Ripley, Ontario, Canada. They play in the Ontario Elite Hockey League of the Ontario Hockey Association and Hockey Canada.

== Championships ==
The Ripley Wolves have won the WOAA Sr. "B" Championship twice in their history, during the 1993-94 and 1994-95 seasons. A former team, the Ripley Roosters, were the WOAA Intermediate "D" champions nine times (1977, 1979, 1981, 1982, 1984, 1985, 1986, 1987, 1988) and were the WOAA Grand Champions twice in 1982 and 1984.

The team captured Ripley's first WOAA senior hockey title in 20 years when it won the Sr. A championship in 2014-15.

== 2006–07 Wolves season ==
The Wolves improved greatly from their 2005-06 season, when they finished with a 7-18-0 record, rebounding to a 12-9-3 record, good for sixth place in the WOAA North Division. They continued their success by sweeping the Goderich Pirates in the Sr. "A" quarter-finals to advance to the Sr. "A" semi-finals.

Ripley's opponent would be the Milverton Four Wheel Drives, and after winning the first game of the series in overtime, the Wolves would drop the next three games to find themselves one loss away from being eliminated. Ripley rebounded though, winning the series in seven games and would move on to the "A" finals.

Ripley then played the Durham Thundercats for the "A" Final, dropped the first game in overtime before rebounding with two wins in a row to take the series lead. Durham would then win two in a row to put Ripley on the brink of elimination, however in game six at Ripley, the Wolves earned a hard fought 7-4 win to send the series to a seventh game in Durham. The Thundercats proved too much to handle, skating their way to a 5-1 victory, and ending the Wolves season one win short of the "A" Championship.

== 2007–08 Wolves season ==
After a highly successful 2006-07, the Wolves would improve once again, setting team records in wins (20) and points (41), while finishing in third place in the WOAA North Division, and earning a spot in the "AA" playoffs for the first time in team history.

Ripley would face the Clinton Radars in the "AA" quarter-finals, and after losing the opening game on the road in Clinton, the Wolves returned home for the second game, and earned their first ever "AA" playoff victory, defeating the Radars 5-2 to even up the series. Clinton proved to be too much for Ripley to handle, as the Radars would take control of the series with wins in games three and four to put the Wolves on the brink of elimination. Clinton then would easily win the fifth game of the series by a 7-3 score, eliminating the Wolves from the playoffs.

== 2008–09 Wolves season ==
After a record breaking regular season in 2007-08, the Wolves slipped back in 2008-09, as they posted a record of 11-7-2, earning 24 points, and a sixth-place finish in the WOAA North Division.

Ripley opened the post-season in a best of seven series against the Shelburne Muskies, with the winner advancing to the "AA" quarter-finals. In the series opener, the Wolves were not able to keep up with Shelburne, as they lost the game 5-3. In the second game, the Muskies blew out Ripley by a 7-1 score to put the Wolves quickly down by two games. Shelburne continued their winning ways in the third game, defeating Ripley 5-3. The fourth game was the closest one of the series, however, the Muskies were able to complete the sweep, defeating Ripley 5-4, and sending the Wolves to the "A" playoffs.

The Wolves faced the Lucknow Lancers in the "A" quarter-finals, and Ripley opened the series with a solid 3-2 victory. Lucknow fought back in the second game, defeating the Wolves 5-4 to even the series up. The third game was another close one, as the Lancers were able to hold off Ripley for a 6-5 win, followed by a 4-2 Lucknow win in the fourth game, as they took a 3-1 series lead. The fifth game would once again be a very close game, as Lucknow squeaked out a 3-2 win, winning the series and eliminating the Wolves from the post-season.

== 2009–10 Wolves season ==
The Wolves would post another winning season in 2009-10, as Ripley had a record of 11-8-1, earning 23 points. Despite finishing with one fewer point than in 2008-09, Ripley improved in the standings, going from sixth place to fourth.

Ripley opened the playoffs against the Durham Thundercats in a best of five qualifying series. The Wolves opened the series with a 7-3 victory on home ice, however, they dropped the second game in Durham by a score of 8-4. Back on home ice in the third game, the Wolves held off the Thundercats, winning 7-5, to take a 2-1 series lead. In the fourth game back in Durham, the Thundercats staved off elimination, as they defeated the Wolves 2-1 in overtime to even the series up, and have a fifth and deciding game. Ripley would hold off the Thundercats in a wild game, winning 7-5, and advance to the "AA" playoffs.

The Wolves opponent in the "AA" quarter-finals would be the Elora Rocks, who finished the season with an unbeaten 20-0-0 record, followed by a three-game sweep against the Shallow Lake Crushers in their qualifying series. The Wolves kept the series opener close, as Elora hung on for a 4-3 victory to take an early series lead. In the second game, the Wolves and Rocks would be tied at six after regulation play, sending the game into overtime. In the extra period, Ripley would stun the Rocks, as they won the game 7-6, to even the series up. In the third game, the Wolves kept their momentum going, as they cruised to a 6-3 win, taking a 2-1 series lead over the heavily favoured Rocks. Elora responded in the fourth game, dominating Ripley in an 11-0 victory. In the fifth game, Elora regained the series lead, defeating Ripley 7-5 to take a 3-2 series lead. Ripley couldn't get anything going in the sixth game, as the Rocks once again were very dominant in a 6-0 victory to eliminate Ripley from the playoffs.

== 2010–11 Wolves season ==
Ripley would struggle in the 2010-11 season, as the team finished with a 10-10-6 record, earning 26 points and a sixth-place finish in the North Division. The ten wins and .500 record was the Wolves worst season since 2005-06, when the team posted a 7-18-0 record.

== Season-by-season record ==
Note: GP = Games played, W = Wins, L = Losses, T= Tie, OTL = Overtime Losses, Pts = Points, GF = Goals for, GA = Goals against

Season	GP	W	L	T	OTL	GF	GA	PTS	Finish	Playoffs
1990–91	24	10	12	2	-	129	135	22	4th in North	Won in Sr. "C" semi-finals (3-2 vs. North Stars); Lost in Sr. "C" finals (1-3 vs. Comets)
1991–92	21	3	16	2	-	83	138	8	4th in Sr. "B"	Lost in Sr. "B" quarter-finals (1-3 vs. Lancers)
1992–93	21	11	7	3	-	126	101	25	4th in Sr. "B"	Lost in Sr. "B" quarter-finals (1-3 vs. Monarchs)
1993–94	19	19	0	0	-	142	46	38	1st in Sr. "B"	Won in Sr. "B" quarter-finals (3-0 vs. Thunder); Won in Sr. "B" semi-finals (4-1 vs. Lancers); Won in Sr. "B" finals (4-0 vs. Tornados)
1994–95	21	19	2	0	0	174	52	38	1st in Sr. "B"	Won in Sr. "B" semi-finals (4-1 vs. Monarchs); Won in Sr. "B" finals (4-0 vs. Flyers)
1995–96	24	17	4	2	1	170	105	37	1st in Sr. "A"	Won in Sr. "A" preliminary round (4-1 vs. Pirates); Won in Sr. "A" semi-finals (4-1 vs. Radars); Lost in Sr. "A" finals (1-4 vs. Crusaders)
1996–97	23	13	9	0	1	111	104	27	5th in Sr. "A"	Won in Sr. "A" preliminary round (4-2 vs. 81's); Won in Sr. "A" semi-finals (4-3 vs. Muskies); Lost in Sr. "A" finals (3-4 vs. Pirates)
1997–98	24	11	12	0	1	111	116	23	2nd in Sr. "A" West	Lost in Sr. "A" preliminary round (1-2 vs. Pirates)
2003–04	24	3	17	3	1	58	132	10	16th in WOAA	Lost in Sr. "AA" qualifying (0-3 vs. Radars); Lost in Sr. "A" quarter-finals (0-4 vs. Wildcats)
2004–05	25	6	18	0	1	84	172	13	16th in WOAA	Lost in Sr. "AA" elimination (0-2 vs. Pirates)
2005–06	25	7	18	-	0	116	160	14	14th in WOAA	Lost in Sr. "AA" qualifying (0-3 vs. Muskies); Lost in Sr. "A" quarter-finals (2-4 vs. Wildcats)
2006–07	24	12	9	-	3	127	122	27	6th in WOAA North	Won in Sr. "A" quarter-finals (4-0 vs. Pirates); Won in Sr. "A" semi-finals (4-3 vs. Drives); Lost in Sr. "A" finals (3-4 vs. Thundercats)
2007–08	26	20	5	-	1	149	80	41	3rd in WOAA North	Lost Sr. "AA" quarter-finals (1-4 vs. Radars)
2008–09	20	11	7	-	2	115	88	22	6th in WOAA North	Lost Sr. "AA" qualifying (0-4 vs. Muskies)
2009–10	20	11	8	-	1	89	87	23	4th in WOAA North	Won Sr. "AA" qualifying (3-2 vs. Thundercats); Lost Sr. "AA" quarter-finals (2-4 vs. Rocks)
2010–11	26	10	10	-	6	111	125	26	6th in WOAA North	Lost Sr. "AA" qualifying (0-4 vs. Muskies)
2011–12	24	11	11	-	2	98	100	24	6th in WOAA North	Lost Sr. "AA" qualifying (2-4 vs. Muskies)
2012–13	24	14	9	-	1	92	88	29	4th in WOAA North	Won Sr. "AA" qualifying (4-1 vs. Thundercats); Lost Sr. "AA" quarter-finals (1-4 vs. Rocks)
2013–14	24	9	12	-	3	98	124	21	6th WOAA North	Lost Sr. "AA" qualifying (1-4 vs. Winterhawks)
2014–15	24	10	13	-	1	102	121	21	6th in WOAA North	Finished Sr. "A" round-robin in 1st place (4-1); Won in Sr. "A" semi-finals (4-3 vs. Drives); Won Sr. "A" finals (4-3 vs. Crushers)
2015–16	24	9	12	-	3	88	106	21	6th in WOAA North	Finished Sr. "A" round-robin in 3rd place (2-2); Won in Sr. "A" semi-finals (4-0 vs. Muskies); Lost in Sr. "A" finals (1-4 vs. Thunder)
2016–17	20	11	7	-	2	81	79	24	6th in WOAA	Lost in "AA" quarter-finals (1-4 vs. Squires)
2017–18	20	17	3	-	0	93	60	34	2nd in WOAA	Won in Sr. "AA" quarter-finals (4-1 vs. Drives); Lost in Sr. "AA" semi-finals (1-4 vs. Thundercats)
2018–19	22	19	2	-	1	133	59	39	2nd in WOAA	Won in Sr. "AA" quarter-finals (4-0 vs. Centenaires); Won in Sr. "AA" semi-finals (4-2 vs. Thundercats); Lost in Sr. "AA" finals (1-4 vs. Radars)
2019–20	22	19	3	-	0	125	50	38	1st in WOAA	Won in Sr. "AA" quarter-finals (4-3 vs. Thundercats); Tied in Sr. "AA" semi-finals (2-2 vs. 81's); Playoffs cancelled due to COVID-19
2021–22	14	11	2	-	1	69	36	23	1st in WOAA	Won in Sr. "AA" quarter-finals (4-0 vs. Muskies); Lost in Sr. "AA" semi-finals (1-4 vs. Radars)
2022–23	20	14	4	-	2	103	65	30	2nd in WOAA	Won in Sr. "AA" quarter-finals (4-0 vs. Squires); Won in Sr. "AA" semi-finals (4-3 vs. Winterhawks); Lost in Sr. "AA" finals (1-4 vs. Royals)
2023–24	20	16	1	-	3	107	53	35	1st in OEHL	Won in OEHL quarter-finals (4-0 vs. Outlaws); Lost in OEHL semi-finals (2-4 vs. Royals)
2024–25	20	18	0	-	2	114	59	37	1st in OEHL	Won in Paxton Trophy quarter-finals (4-0 vs. Outlaws); Won in Paxton Trophy semi-finals (4-2 vs. Winterhawks); Lost in Paxton Trophy finals (0-4 vs. 81's)
2025–26	20	16	4	-	0	117	49	32	1st in North	Won in divisional quarter-finals (4-0 vs. Muskies); Won in divisional semi-finals (4-3 vs. Thundercats); Won in divisional finals (4-2 vs. 81's); Lost in Paxton Trophy finals (2-4 vs. Centenaires)

More information will be added as more becomes available

== Related links ==
- Ripley, Ontario
- Western Ontario Athletic Association
- WOAA Senior Hockey League
