= Thedford, Ontario =

Coordinates: 43.165434°N 81.854665°W

Thedford is an unincorporated community in Ontario, Canada. It is recognized as a designated place by Statistics Canada.

== Demographics ==
In the 2021 Census of Population conducted by Statistics Canada, Thedford had a population of 842 living in 347 of its 361 total private dwellings, a change of 12.4% from its 2016 population of 749. With a land area of 2.24 km^{2} (0.86 sq mi), it had a population density of 375.9/km^{2} (973.6/sq mi) in 2021.

== See also ==
- List of communities in Ontario
- List of designated places in Ontario
