= Komoka Classics =

- City: Komoka, Ontario
- League: WOAA Senior Hockey League
- Division: South
- Home arena: North Middlesex Community Wellness and Recreation Centre
- Colours: Black, Red, and White
- General manager: Rob Andrews
- Head coach: Rick Pikul

Franchise history
- 2004–2011: Lucan-Ilderton Jets
- 2011–2014: Komoka Classics

The Komoka Classics were a senior ice hockey team based out of Komoka, Ontario, Canada. They played in the Western Ontario Athletic Association Senior Hockey League. They folded in 2014 after winning the WOAA Sr. AA championship.

== History ==
The Lucan Irish and the Ilderton Wildcats were members of the WOAA Intermediate league in the 1950s. In 1959, the teams merged to become the Lucan-Ilderton Combines. By 1968, the top tier of the WOAA joined the Ontario Hockey Association to form the Central Intermediate B Hockey League, with that the team changed its name to the Jets.

In 1970, the Jets jumped to the Southern Counties Intermediate B Hockey League. In 1971–72, the Jets were particularly strong and walked away from the intermediate leagues to play an independent schedule and later attempt to challenge for the Allan Cup.

In 1972, the Jets joined the Western Ontario Senior B Hockey League. In 1973, the league became the Continental Senior B Hockey League. In 1975, the league was upgraded to the Continental Senior A Hockey League. The Jets left the league in 1980. Their most notable feuds were with the Durham Huskies and Cambridge Hornets.

From 1980 until 2004, Lucan-Ilderton seeming dropped off the map. In 2004, the Jets returned to the WOAA Senior Hockey League.

=== Championships ===
The Jets won the 2004–05 WOAA Sr. "A" championship, which was their first season in the WOAA. Previous Lucan championship seasons included 1945 when Lucan captured the Intermediate B title defeating Marmora and in 1955 when the Lucan Irish Six, won the 1955 WOAA Grand Championship. The Lucan-Ilderton Jets were OHA Senior A champions in 1970 defeating the Napanee Comets in the final and OHA Western Senior B champions in 1973 and Continental Senior B champions in 1975 defeating Stratford Perths on both occasions.

=== 2006–07 season ===
Lucan-Ilderton had another strong season, finishing in second place in the South Division with a strong 18–5–1 record.

The Jets would face the Elora Rocks in the opening round of the "AA" quarter-finals, and after Lucan won the opening game of the series, Elora would win three in a row, including two straight in overtime, to put the Jets in a must win situation. The Jets responded in game five with a 6–5 OT victory, but would fall short in the sixth game, losing 6–3 and being eliminated from the playoffs.

=== 2007–08 season ===
The Jets would once again have a very strong regular season, earning a 17–7–2 record, finishing in third place in the South Division.

Lucan-Ilderton would once again face the Elora Rocks in the "AA" quarter-finals, and the Jets would lose the opening game by a close score of 4–3. Lucan-Ilderton would fall down 2–0 in the series after losing 6–2 on home ice, then fall behind 3–0 after the Rocks shut out the Jets 5–0 in Elora. Elora would complete the sweep with a 6–4 win in the fourth game, eliminating the Jets from the playoffs for the second straight season.

=== 2008–09 season ===
Lucan-Ilderton would have another very strong regular season, earning a record of 15–3–2, registering 32 points and second place in the WOAA South Division.

The Jets opened the post-season against the Monkton Wildcats, with the winner advancing to the "AA" playoffs. Lucan-Ilderton took the series lead with a convincing 4–1 win in the first game, however, the Wildcats fought back in the second game, and evened the series with a 3–1 win. In the third game, Monkton took the series lead, defeating the Jets 5–4 in overtime, followed by a 1–0 shutout win in the fourth game by the Wildcats which put Lucan-Ilderton down 3–1 in the series. Monkton completed the upset in the fifth game, defeating the Jets 4–2 to send Lucan-Ilderton to the "A" playoffs. Lucan-Ilderton will face the Goderich Pirates in the "A" quarter-finals.

=== Move to Komoka ===
In the summer of 2011, the Jets elected to move to the Town of Komoka.

== Season-by-season record ==
Note: GP = Games played, W = Wins, L = Losses, T= Tie, OTL = Overtime Losses, Pts = Points, GF = Goals for, GA = Goals against

Season	GP	W	L	T	OTL	GF	GA	PTS	Finish	Playoffs
2004–05	25	15	5	2	3	129	95	35	8th WOAA Sr	"A" Champs
2005–06	25	18	6	–	1	123	85	37	7th WOAA Sr	Lost "AA" QF
2006–07	24	18	5	–	1	146	94	37	2nd WOAA South	Lost "AA" QF
2007–08	26	17	7	–	2	122	80	36	3rd WOAA South	Lost "AA" QF
2008–09	20	15	3	–	2	107	66	32	2nd WOAA South	Won "A" Championship
2009–10	20	10	9	-	1	93	81	21	4th WOAA South	Lost "A" SF
2010–11	26	12	14	–	0	118	132	24	5th WOAA South	
2011–12	24	15	8	–	1	128	95	31	4th WOAA South	
2012–13	24	21	2	–	1	149	59	43	1st WOAA South	
2013–14	24	16	6	–	2	139	89	34	3rd WOAA South	Won "AA" Championship

=== The Original Jets ===
Season	GP	W	L	T	GF	GA	PTS	Finish	Playoffs
1977–78	35	6	28	1	116	217	13	7th CSAHL	
1978–79	42	12	30	0	168	268	24	8th CSAHL	
1979–80	49	6	43	0	138	295	12	9th CSAHL	DNQ

More information will be added as more becomes available
