= Shallow Lake, Ontario =

Unincorporated community in Ontario, Canada

Coordinates: 44.614606°N 81.085326°W

Shallow Lake is an unincorporated community in Ontario, Canada. It is recognized as a designated place by Statistics Canada.

== Demographics ==
In the 2021 Census of Population conducted by Statistics Canada, Shallow Lake had a population of 541 living in 206 of its 214 total private dwellings, a change of 7.1% from its 2016 population of 505. With a land area of 1.54 km^{2} (0.59 sq mi), it had a population density of 351.3/km^{2} (909.9/sq mi) in 2021.

== See also ==
- List of communities in Ontario
- List of designated places in Ontario
