= Shallow Lake Crushers =

- City: Shallow Lake, Ontario
- League: WOAA Senior Hockey League
- Division: North
- Founded: 2007
- Folded: 2023
- Home arena: Shallow Lake Arena
- Colours: Orange, Black, White
- General manager: Rick LeQuyere
- Head coach: Rod Currie

The Shallow Lake Crushers were a senior hockey team based in Shallow Lake, Ontario, Canada. Their inaugural season started in October 2007.

In the summer of 2023 ten of the twelve existing teams voted to leave WOAA Senior Hockey League and reform under the umbrella of the Ontario Hockey Association.

With the move to the OHA, the league rebranded as the Ontario Elite Hockey League and added two new teams. Shallow Lake chose to take a year off.

== History ==
=== 2007-08 Crushers Season ===
The Crushers played their first ever game at home, losing to the Ripley Wolves by a score of 11-1. Shallow Lake continued to struggle, as they lost their first twelve games, being outscored 103-30 in the process, before defeating the Georgian Bay River Rats by a score of 6-1 in their thirteenth game and earn their first ever victory. Shallow Lake played better hockey as the season went on, highlighted by a 6-4 win on the road over the Ripley Wolves. The Crushers finished their expansion season with a 3-22-1 record, finishing in last place in the North Division.

The club faced the Drayton Icemen in a best of three qualifying series, with the winner advancing to the WOAA "A" playoffs. Shallow Lake took a lead in the third period during the 1st game of the series, before the Icemen mounted a comeback and took the game 5-4. The Crushers rebounded in game two, holding off Drayton and even up the series with a solid 4-2 victory. Game three was another close game between the two clubs, as it was tied 4-4 after three periods of play. Drayton then scored a goal in the extra period, ending the Crushers inaugural season in the league.

=== 2008-09 Crushers Season ===
The Crushers started the regular season on the right foot, surprising the Lucknow Lancers in the first game of the season with an 8-7 victory. After that, wins were few and far between, as Shallow Lake finished the year with a 3-16-1 record, earning seven points, and tenth place in the WOAA North Division.

Shallow Lake faced the Walkerton Capitals in the "B" semi-finals. The Crushers won their first ever playoff series on February 27 in game six at home, defeating Walkerton 5-3 and winning the series four games to two. The win advanced them to the "B" final against the Milverton Four Wheel Drives.

After dropping game one at home 7-3, the Crushers rallied in game two in Milverton, and come out on top with a 7-6 overtime win. Milverton won the next two games to go up three games to one heading home for game five. Shallow lake surprised Milverton once again and defeat them 2-1 in Milverton to force a game six in Shallow Lake. Shallow Lake led the game 1-0 going into the second period but Milverton came back to lead 3-2 at the end of the period. Milverton got the bounces in the third period and fired the final goal into an empty net for a 6-3 final score and the championship.

=== 2009-10 Crushers Season ===
After two very poor regular seasons, in which the Crushers won three games in each of those seasons, Shallow Lake saw some improvement, as the team won a club record seven games, earning 15 points, and eighth place in the WOAA North Division standings, as the team made the "AA" playoffs for the first time in team history.

The playoffs opened with a best of five series against the first place, and unbeaten, Elora Rocks. The Rocks had no problem defeating the Crushers, as Elora swept the series in three games, winning by scores of 7-1, 7-2, and 4-1, to send the Crushers to the "A" playoff bracket.

The Crushers faced off against the Durham Thundercats in the "A" quarter-finals. Durham took the series opener by a 4-1 score, but Shallow Lake rebounded in the second game, and easily defeated the Thundercats 8-1 to even the series up. In the third game, the Crushers surprised the Thundercats once again, as they defeated Durham 8-5 to take a 2-1 lead. Shallow Lake stayed hot in the fourth game, as they pushed the Thundercats to the brink of elimination with a 4-1 win to take a 3-1 series lead.

The fifth game went into overtime, and Durham scored in the extra period to keep their playoff hopes alive. In the sixth game, the Thundercats easily defeated the Crushers 7-3 to force a seventh and deciding game in Durham. Shallow Lake took an early 1-0 lead in the last game, however, the Thundercats responded by scoring three goals before the end of the first period to take a 3-1 lead. Durham added a goal in the second period to take a 4-1 going into the third, but the Crushers scored two quick goals in the middle of the period to cut the Thundercats lead to 4-3. That was as close as Shallow Lake could get, as Durham held them off to win the game, and the series, 4-3, eliminating Shallow Lake from the playoffs.

=== 2010-11 Crushers season ===
Shallow Lake once again improved, as the team won a team record ten games, finishing with 22 points, and a second straight eighth place finish in the North Division.

== Season-by-Season record ==
Note: GP = Games played, W = Wins, L = Losses, T= Tie, OTL = Overtime Losses, Pts = Points, GF = Goals for, GA = Goals against

| Season | GP | W | L | T | OTL | GF | GA | PTS | Finish | Playoffs |
|---|---|---|---|---|---|---|---|---|---|---|
| 2007-08 | 26 | 3 | 22 | - | 1 | 73 | 199 | 7 | 9th WOAA North | Lost Qualifying |
| 2008-09 | 20 | 3 | 16 | - | 1 | 61 | 164 | 7 | 10th WOAA North | Lost "B" Final |
| 2009-10 | 20 | 7 | 12 | - | 1 | 69 | 117 | 15 | 8th WOAA North | Lost "A" QF |
| 2010-11 | 26 | 10 | 14 | - | 2 | 96 | 123 | 22 | 8th WOAA North | |
| 2011-12 | 24 | 9 | 13 | - | 2 | 99 | 136 | 20 | 7th WOAA North | |
| 2012-13 | 24 | 8 | 12 | - | 4 | 102 | 105 | 20 | 6th WOAA North | |
| 2013-14 | 24 | 12 | 10 | - | 2 | 92 | 91 | 26 | 4th WOAA North | Lost Div. Quarter-final |
| 2014-15 | 24 | 10 | 13 | - | 1 | 99 | 115 | 21 | 4th WOAA North | Lost Senior a Final |

== Related links ==
- Shallow Lake, Ontario
- Western Ontario Athletic Association
- WOAA Senior Hockey League
