= Clinton Radars =

Ice hockey team in Ontario, Canada

- City: Clinton, Ontario
- League: WOAA Senior Hockey League
- Division: South
- Founded: 1994
- Folded: 2022
- Home arena: Central Huron Community Complex
- Colours: Red, Blue, and White
- General manager: TBA
- Head coach: Chad Haggitt

The Clinton Radars are a senior hockey team based out of Clinton, Ontario, Canada. The team was founded in 1994. They play in the Western Ontario Athletic Association Senior Hockey League.

In September 2022, the club issued a statement announcing the club's withdrawal from WOAA Senior Hockey League. In addition to thanking the fans and sponsors, the statement also included the possibility of a return for the 2023–24 season, which, however, did not materialize.

== History ==
=== Championships ===
The Radars finally won their first WOAA "AA" championship in 2015-16 in their 22nd year of competition.

The Radars repeated in 2016-17 to win their second "AA" championship.

The Radars three-peated in 2017-18 for their third straight "AA" championship.

The Radars won their fourth "AA" championship in a row in 2018-19.

=== 2006–07 Radars season ===
Clinton, coming off a 17-7-1 season, improved to a 19-3-2 season, and finished in first place in the South Division, including an impressive 11-0-1 record at home.

In the "AA" quarter-finals, the Radars faced the Palmerston 81's, and after winning the opening game, the Radars would lose the next two in OT to fall behind Palmerston two games to one. Clinton rebounded and took the next two games to put the 81's on the brink of elimination with a 3-2 series lead, however Palmerston would rebound in game six to tie up the series and force a seventh game in Clinton. The Radars would take an early lead and never look back en route to a 6-2 win and take the series 4-3.

Clinton would face the Tavistock Royals in the semi-finals, and would get the series off on the right foot with a 6-4 victory in game one. The Radars would then go into overtime in each of the next two games, however the lost them both and found themselves down 2-1 in the series. Game four would be another close game where the Radars found themselves on the wrong side, losing 3-2, and the Royals would end Clinton's season in the fifth game, as the Radars lost a close, hard fought game 5-4 to be eliminated from the playoffs.

=== 2007–08 Radars season ===
The Radars, who finished on top of the South Division in 2006-07, slid into second place, finishing the season with eight consecutive wins and a 19-6-1 record, earning 39 points, and qualifying for the "AA" playoffs.

Clinton faced the Ripley Wolves in the "AA" quarter-finals, and the teams exchanged victories in the opening two games before the Radars took control of the series. Clinton took the third game by a 7-4 score, then winning the fourth game, holding off the Wolves for a 5-4 victory to take a 3-1 series lead. The Radars would close out the series in the fifth game, defeating Ripley 7-3, and advancing to the semi-finals.

The Radars next opponent in the "AA" semi-finals would be the Tavistock Royals, the same team who eliminated Clinton the previous season. Tavistock would take an early series lead, winning the opener 8-5, then the Royals would destroy the Radars in the second game by an 8-1 score to take control of the series. Clinton dropped a close third game, losing 5-3, and end up being swept in the series, as they lost the fourth game by a 5-4 score in overtime.

=== 2008–09 Radars season ===
Clinton would continue to slide down the standings, as they finished the year with a 13-6-1 record, earning 27 points, and fourth place in the WOAA South Division. The 27 points would be the lowest point total earned the Radars since the 2000-01 season. Clinton beat the Tillsonburg Thunder in seven games in the first round of the playoffs. The Radars took a 3-1 series lead before being pushed to a seventh game. The Radars won game seven 6-5 in double overtime. The Radars were then eliminated in the "AA" quarter-finals by the Tavistock Royals (again) in seven games. Tavistock won game seven 5-4 in overtime. Four of the series seven games were decided in overtime.

=== 2009–10 Radars season ===
The Radars regression continued as they finished the regular season with a record of 8 wins, 10 losses, and 2 OT losses. The 18 points put them in 5th place. The Radars played Lucan in the "AA" qualifying round, losing three games to one. In the "A" playoffs the Radars lost to Thedford in six games.

=== 2010–11 Radars season ===
The 2010-11 season was one of the worst in team history, finishing last in the South division with a record of 6 wins, 18 losses and 2 overtime losses. The Radars lost the "B" finals in four games to Walkerton. The lone bright spot of the season was the play of Luke Vick, who finished 2nd in the league's scoring race. Vick collected 58 points (27g, 31a) in 26 games.

=== 2011–12 Radars season ===
The rebuilding Radars bounced back with a 15 win season and finished in third place in the South division. In the playoffs, the Radars swept Milverton in the first round only to lose four straight to Tillsonburg in the second round.

=== 2015–16 Radars season ===
The Radars were an offensive juggernaut during the regular season, having the league's top 4 leading scorers in their lineup. Kurtis Bartliff led the way with 66 points (31g, 35a), followed by Luke Vick's 62 (20g, 42a), Tyler Doig's 59 (20g, 29a) and Ryan Murphy's 56 (32g, 24a). The Radars finished on top of the South Division with 43 points (21 wins, 2 losses and 1 overtime loss).

In the first round of the playoffs, the Radars dusted off the Huron East Centenaires in four straight games and then defeated the Petrolia Squires in six tight games to reach their first AA championship series since 2005.

It took 22 seasons but the Radars finally won their first AA championship when they swept the top-seeded Mapleton-Minto 81's in the final round. Doig led the team & league in playoff scoring with 35 points (9g, 26a) in 14 games.

=== 2016–17 Radars season ===
The Radars had an up and down regular season and finished in fourth place with 26 points (12 wins, 6 losses, 2 overtime losses). Kurtis Bartliff led the team with 39 points (20g, 19a) in 19 games.

In the playoffs, the Radars got by the Tavistock Royals in six games and then ousted the first place Saugeen Shores Winterhawks in another difficult six game series. The Radars won their second straight AA title by defeating the Petrolia Squires in six thrilling games in the finals. Tyler Doig led the team & league in playoff scoring with 32 points (11g, 21a) in 17 games

=== 2017–18 Radars season ===
After winning two consecutive WOAA Senior AA championships in 2016 and 2017, the Radars were granted special permission by the WOAA and the Ontario Hockey Association to play against the Whitby Dunlops of the Allan Cup Hockey Senior AAA league on 30 September 2017. As the two league have different governing bodies, this is a rare occurrence. The last known matchup between these two leagues was a home-and-home series between the Cambridge Hornets and Durham Thundercats in 1999 - each winning a game. The Radars won the game 3-2 after trailing 2-0 after the first. The Radars outshot the Dunlops 39-22.

The Radars then went on to an undefeated regular season (20-0) and swept the league's regular season awards. Kurtis Bartliff won the scoring title for the second time in three seasons with 38 points (19g, 19a). Nathan Ansell was named the league's Most Sportsmanlike Player while goalies Marc Nother and Drew Reinhardt set a league record with just 39 goals against in 20 games.

In the playoffs, the Radars defeated Huron East in four straight and then eliminated the Tillsonburg Thunder in six games, moving on to win their third straight 'AA' championship, sweeping Durham in the finals when Max Campbell scored the overtime winner in Game 4. Stephen Sanza led the team & league in playoff scoring with 28 points (10g, 18a) in 14 games

=== 2018–19 Radars season ===
The Radars finished on top of the regular season standings with a record of 20 wins, 1 loss and 1 overtime loss. Stephen Sanza led the league in scoring with 59 points (23g, 36a). The Radars swept the Tavistock Royals in the first round of the playoffs, then they beat out the Saugeen Shores Winterhawks in six hard fought games in the semi-finals. In the finals, the Radars beat the Ripley Wolves in five games to capture their unprecedented fourth straight AA championship! Tyler Doig led the team with 25 points (9g, 16a) in 13 playoff games. Greg Dodds won 7 games, while Drew Reinhardt picked up 5 wins in goal for the Radars during the postseason.

== Season-by-season record ==
Note: GP = Games played, W = Wins, L = Losses, T= Tie, OTL = Overtime Losses, Pts = Points, GF = Goals for, GA = Goals against

Season	GP	W	L	T	OTL	GF	GA	PTS	Finish	Playoffs
1998-99	24	10	12	2	0	--	--	22	6th WOAA Sr	Lost "A" Final
1999-00	25	11	11	2	1	--	--	25	8th WOAA Sr	
2000-01	24	12	11	1	0	--	--	25	4th WOAA South	
2001-02	24	15	8	1	0	101	84	31	3rd WOAA South	
2002-03	24	18	6	0	0	142	85	36	2nd WOAA Sr	Lost "AA" SF
2003-04	24	22	2	0	0	148	74	44	1st WOAA Sr	Lost "AA" Final
2004-05	25	17	5	0	3	123	80	37	5th WOAA Sr	Lost "AA" Final
2005-06	25	17	7	-	1	114	90	35	8th WOAA Sr	Lost "AA" QF
2006-07	24	19	3	-	2	138	70	40	1st WOAA South	Lost "AA" SF
2007-08	26	19	6	-	1	123	85	39	2nd WOAA South	Lost "AA" SF
2008-09	20	13	6	-	1	89	67	27	4th WOAA South	Lost "AA" QF
2009-10	20	8	10	-	2	74	86	18	5th WOAA South	Lost "A" QF
2010-11	26	6	18	-	2	90	154	14	9th WOAA South	Lost "B" Final
2011-12	24	15	8	-	1	100	84	31	3rd WOAA South	Lost "AA" QF
2012-13	24	20	4	-	0	124	53	40	2nd WOAA South	Lost Division QF
2013-14	24	12	10	-	2	109	78	26	4th WOAA South	Lost Division SF
2014-15	24	15	7	-	2	128	92	32	4th WOAA South	Lost Division SF
2015-16	24	21	2	-	1	187	66	43	1st WOAA South	Won "AA" Championship
2016-17	20	12	6	-	2	110	65	26	4th WOAA Sr	Won "AA" Championship
2017-18	20	20	0	-	0	137	39	40	1st WOAA Sr	Won "AA" Championship
2018-19	22	20	1	-	1	171	61	41	1st WOAA Sr	Won "AA" Championship
2019-20	22	16	6	-	0	121	62	32	4th WOAA Sr	Covid-19 ruined 5 in a row

== Related links ==
- Clinton, Ontario
- Western Ontario Athletic Association
- WOAA Senior Hockey League
