= Tillsonburg Thunder =

- City: Tillsonburg, Ontario
- League: Ontario Elite Hockey League
- Founded: 2001
- Home arena: Tillsonburg Community Centre
- Colours: Black and Gold
- General manager: Joe Ryan
- Head coach: Terry Corbin
- Website: tillsonburgthunder.ca

Franchise history
- 2001-2008: Tillsonburg Vipers
- 2008-Pres: Tillsonburg Thunder

The 2014-2015 Champion Tillsonburg Thunder are a Senior ice hockey team based in Tillsonburg, Ontario, Canada. They play in the Western Ontario Super Hockey League.

Tillsonburg Vipers player in 2007-08 season.

== History ==
The Tillsonburg Vipers were founded in 2001 as a Senior "AAA" team in the Ontario Hockey Association's Major League Hockey.

In the 2003–04 season, the Vipers reached the J. Ross Robertson Cup finals, but lost to the Aylmer Blues 4-games-to-2.

Tillsonburg's improved on their 2003-04 record in the 2005-06 season. After finishing the regular season in second place with 17 wins in 30 games, the Vipers knocked off the Cambridge Hornets 4-games-to-3 to make the league finals. In the league final, the Vipers fell to the Dundas Real McCoys 4-games-to-3.

The MLH fell apart in 2008, just after the Brantford Blast won the league's first ever Allan Cup. The team filled the gap when the disgruntled Cambridge Hornets left the MLH, the collegiate Windsor St. Clair Saints, walked away from the league. The Vipers decided it was their time to leave as well and applied to join the Western Ontario Athletic Association Senior Hockey League. The WOAA is an independent league with no connections to the Ontario Hockey Association. It classifies itself as Senior "AA", and allows for both a Senior "AA" and Senior "A" championship come playoff time. On May 14, 2008, the WOAA granted expansion to the Tillsonburg Vipers.

The first ever Tillsonburg WOAA game took place on October 4, 2008, as the Thunder defeated the Goderich Pirates 6-5 in overtime in Tillsonburg. The Thunder had a successful first season in the WOAA, earning a record of 11-7-2, registering 24 points, and fifth place in the South Division. Tillsonburg would lose to the Clinton Radars in the "AA" qualifying round, being sent to the "A" playoffs. In the "A" quarter-finals, the Thunder were upset by the Exeter Mohawks in six games, ending their season.

== Season-by-season standings ==
Season	GP	W	L	T	OTL	GF	GA	P	Results	Playoffs
2001-02	32	6	23	2	1	128	241	15	5th SWSHL	
2002-03	32	11	18	2	1	150	174	25	4th OHA Sr. A	Lost semi-final
2003-04	32	17	11	2	2	159	129	38	4th OHA Sr. A	Lost final
2004-05	32	16	15	0	1	141	129	34	4th MLH	Lost semi-final
2005-06	30	17	9	0	4	135	129	38	2nd MLH	Lost final
2006-07	30	14	12	-	4	149	146	32	4th MLH	Lost semi-final
2007-08	30	11	17	-	2	108	147	24	4th MLH	Lost semi-final
2008-09	20	11	7	-	2	100	84	24	5th WOAA South	Lost "A" QF
2009-10	20	16	4	-	0	97	62	32	1st WOAA South	Lost "AA" QF
2010-11	26	16	9	-	1	134	114	33	4th WOAA South	
2011-12	24	16	7	-	1	130	95	33	2nd WOAA South	
2012-13	24	14	6	-	4	127	96	32	4th WOAA South	
2013-14	24	21	3	-	0	128	70	42	1st WOAA South	Lost Div. Final
2014-15	24	18	5	-	0	152	92	37	1st WOAA South	Won "AA" Championship
2015-16	24	9	12	-	3	95	137	21	5th WOAA South	Won "A" Championship
2016-17	20	11	8	-	1	95	76	23	7th WOAA Sr	Lost "AA" QF
2017-18	20	14	3	-						4th WOAA sr. Lost in AA semi
2018-19	22	11	11	0	0	100	104	22	9th WOAA South	Lost "A" Semifinal
2019-20	22	13	7	-	2	112	88	28	4th WOAA South	Playoffs Interrupted
2020-21	0	0	0	-	0	0	0	0	-	Season Cancelled
2021-22	20	10	10	0	0	109	83	20	3rd OSHL	Final loss
2022-23	24	17	7	-	-	154	99	34	4th OSHL	Final loss
2023-24	24	18	8	-	2	132	94	34	2nd OSHL	Champion
