= 2006–07 WOAA Senior League season =

- League: WOAA Senior AA Hockey League
- Sport: Hockey
- Duration: Regular season October 2006 – January 2007; Playoffs; February 2007 – April 2007
- Teams: 18
- Finals champions: Sr. AA - Elora Rocks; Sr. A - Durham Thundercats

WOAA Senior League seasons
- 2005–06 2007–08

The 2006–07 WOAA Senior League season was the 17th season of the WOAA Senior AA Hockey League. The league played a 24-game regular season which began in October 2006 and concluded in January 2007. The post-season began in February 2007 and concluded in April 2007.

The Elora Rocks won the WOAA Senior AA Hockey Championship, defeating the Tavistock Royals in the final round of the playoffs.

== Team changes ==
- The league splits into two divisions: North and South.
- The Thedford Dirty Dogs join the league as an expansion team.
- The Listowel Jets withdrew from the league and fold.

== Regular season ==
=== Final standings ===
Note: GP = Games played; W = Wins; L= Losses; OTL = Overtime losses; GF = Goals for; GA = Goals against; Pts = Points; Green shade = Clinched "AA" playoff spot

Rank	North Division	GP	W	L	OTL	SL	Pts	GF	GA
1	Lucknow Lancers	24	20	2	0	2	42	154	75
2	Shelburne Muskies	24	18	6	0	0	36	129	88
3	Elora Rocks	24	16	5	2	1	35	163	100
4	Palmerston 81's	24	17	7	0	0	34	159	82
5	Durham Thundercats	24	15	8	1	0	31	125	97
6	Ripley Wolves	24	12	9	3	0	27	127	122
7	Mildmay Monarchs	24	6	16	1	1	14	91	138
8	Drayton Icemen	24	4	19	1	0	9	70	185
9	Georgian Bay River Rats	24	0	24	0	0	0	49	180

Rank	South Division	GP	W	L	OTL	SL	Pts	GF	GA
1	Clinton Radars	24	19	3	1	1	40	138	70
2	Lucan-Ilderton Jets	24	18	5	1	0	37	145	94
3	Tavistock Royals	24	18	6	0	0	36	168	84
4	Hensall Sherwoods	24	13	9	1	1	28	127	103
5	Milverton Four Wheel Drives	24	12	10	1	1	26	130	113
6	Wingham Bulls	24	12	12	0	0	24	103	118
7	Goderich Pirates	24	9	13	2	0	20	120	150
8	Monkton Wildcats	24	7	17	0	0	14	100	137
9	Thedford Dirty Dogs	24	0	23	0	1	1	57	219

=== Scoring leaders ===
Note: GP = Games played; G = Goals; A = Assists; Pts = Points; PIM = Penalty minutes

Player	Team	GP	G	A	Pts	PIM
Travis Van Gaver	Ripley Wolves	22	18	49	67	8
Brent McDermid	Lucknow Lancers	23	33	20	53	18
Chris Pugliese	Elora Rocks	23	26	26	52	14
Darren MacDonald	Ripley Wolves	23	21	30	51	14
Shawn Walker	Wingham Bulls	22	27	23	50	59
Dave Meriam	Goderich Pirates	24	21	29	50	8
Curtis Pinder	Palmerston 81's	23	20	29	49	22
Matt MacPhee	Goderich Pirates	24	17	31	48	103
Mark Stanley	Lucknow Lancers	24	30	16	46	22
Jeremy Van Bergen	Hensall Sherwoods	24	23	23	46	60

== Playoffs ==
=== WOAA Senior "AA" Hockey playoffs ===
Sr. AA quarter-finals
1	Lucknow	4
8	Hensall	1
3	Lucan-Ilderton	2
6	Elora	4
2	Clinton	4
7	Palmerston	3
4	Tavistock	4
5	Shelburne	3

Sr. AA semi-finals
1	Lucknow	0
6	Elora	4
2	Clinton	1
4	Tavistock	4

Sr. AA finals
6	Elora	4
4	Tavistock	3

==== WOAA Senior AA quarter-finals ====
===== (1) Lucknow Lancers vs. (8) Hensall Sherwoods =====
February 9	Hensall Sherwoods	3 – 4	Lucknow Lancers	Lucknow

February 10	Lucknow Lancers	3 – 5	Hensall Sherwoods	Hensall

February 16	Hensall Sherwoods	3 – 5	Lucknow Lancers	Lucknow

February 17	Lucknow Lancers	5 – 3	Hensall Sherwoods	Hensall

February 23	Hensall Sherwoods	1 – 6	Lucknow Lancers	Lucknow

Lucknow wins series 4 – 1

===== (2) Clinton Radars vs. (7) Palmerston 81's =====
Note: Game four played in Harriston, Ontario.

February 9	Palmerston 81's	2 – 3	Clinton Radars	Clinton

February 11	Clinton Radars	3 – 4	OT	Palmerston 81's	Palmerston

February 16	Palmerston 81's	3 – 2	2OT	Clinton Radars	Clinton

February 17	Clinton Radars	5 – 2	Palmerston 81's	Palmerston

February 23	Palmerston 81's	1 – 4	Clinton Radars	Clinton

February 25	Clinton Radars	2 – 5	Palmerston 81's	Palmerston

February 27	Palmerston 81's	2 – 6	Clinton Radars	Clinton

Clinton wins series 4 – 3

===== (3) Lucan-Ilderton Jets vs. (6) Elora Rocks =====
February 10	Elora Rocks	3 – 4	Lucan-Ilderton Jets	Lucan

February 16	Lucan-Ilderton Jets	3 – 7	Elora Rocks	Elora

February 17	Elora Rocks	6 – 5	OT	Lucan-Ilderton Jets	Lucan

February 18	Lucan-Ilderton Jets	2 – 3	OT	Elora Rocks	Elora

February 24	Elora Rocks	5 – 6	OT	Lucan-Ilderton Jets	Lucan

February 25	Lucan-Ilderton Jets	3 – 6	Elora Rocks	Elora

Elora wins series 4 – 2

===== (4) Tavistock Royals vs. (5) Shelburne Muskies =====
February 9	Tavistock Royals	6 – 3	Shelburne Muskies	Shelburne

February 10	Shelburne Muskies	5 – 6	OT	Tavistock Royals	Tavistock

February 16	Shelburne Muskies	6 – 4	Tavistock Royals	Tavistock

February 17	Tavistock Royals	4 – 5	Shelburne Muskies	Shelburne

February 21	Shelburne Muskies	5 – 3	Tavistock Royals	Tavistock

February 23	Tavistock Royals	6 – 4	Shelburne Muskies	Shelburne

February 24	Shelburne Muskies	5 – 8	Tavistock Royals	Tavistock

Tavistock wins series 4 – 3

==== WOAA Senior AA semi-finals ====
===== (1) Lucknow Lancers vs. (6) Elora Rocks =====
March 2	Elora Rocks	6 – 5	2OT	Lucknow Lancers	Lucknow

March 7	Lucknow Lancers	3 – 6	Elora Rocks	Elora

March 9	Elora Rocks	5 – 4	OT	Lucknow Lancers	Lucknow

March 16	Lucknow Lancers	2 – 3	Elora Rocks	Elora

Elora wins series 4 – 0

===== (2) Clinton Radars vs. (4) Tavistock Royals =====
March 2	Tavistock Royals	4 – 6	Clinton Radars	Clinton

March 3	Clinton Radars	3 – 4	OT	Tavistock Royals	Tavistock

March 9	Tavistock Royals	5 – 4	OT	Clinton Radars	Clinton

March 10	Clinton Radars	2 – 3	Tavistock Royals	Tavistock

March 16	Tavistock Royals	5 – 4	Clinton Radars	Clinton

Tavistock wins series 4 – 1

==== WOAA Sr. AA Championship ====
===== (4) Tavistock Royals vs. (6) Elora Rocks =====
March 24	Elora Rocks	6 – 3	Tavistock Royals	Tavistock

March 25	Tavistock Royals	8 – 4	Elora Rocks	Elora

March 31	Elora Rocks	6 – 5	OT	Tavistock Royals	Tavistock

April 1	Tavistock Royals	8 – 6	Elora Rocks	Elora

April 7	Elora Rocks	3 – 7	Tavistock Royals	Tavistock

April 8	Tavistock Royals	3 – 5	Elora Rocks	Elora

April 11	Elora Rocks	7 – 3	Tavistock Royals	Tavistock

Elora wins series 4 – 3

=== WOAA Senior "A" Hockey playoffs ===
Sr. A qualifying
N5	Durham	bye
S8	Monkton	2
S9	Thedford	1
S6	Wingham	bye
N7	Mildmay	bye
S5	Milverton	bye
N8	Drayton	2
N9	Georgian Bay	0
N6	Ripley	bye
S7	Goderich	bye

Sr. A quarter-finals
N5	Durham	4
S8	Monkton	2
S6	Wingham	4
N7	Mildmay	0
S5	Milverton	4
N8	Drayton	2
N6	Ripley	4
S7	Goderich	0

Sr. A semi-finals
1	Durham	4
4	Wingham	1
3	Milverton	3
2	Ripley	4

Sr. A finals
1	Durham	4
2	Ripley	3

==== WOAA Senior A qualifying round ====
===== (N8) Drayton Icemen vs. (N9) Georgian Bay River Rats =====
February 2	Georgian Bay River Rats	5 – 6	Drayton Icemen	Drayton

February 3	Drayton Icemen	5 – 1	Georgian Bay River Rats	Thornbury

Drayton wins series 2 – 0

===== (S8) Monkton Wildcats vs. (S9) Thedford Dirty Dogs =====
February 2	Thedford Dirty Dogs	5 – 6	Monkton Wildcats	Monkton

February 3	Monkton Wildcats	1 – 2	Thedford Dirty Dogs	Thedford

February 6	Thedford Dirty Dogs	2 – 3	Monkton Wildcats	Monkton

Monkton wins series 2 – 1

==== WOAA Senior A quarter-finals ====
===== (N5) Durham Thundercats vs. (S8) Monkton Wildcats =====
February 9	Monkton Wildcats	3 – 8	Durham Thundercats	Durham

February 11	Durham Thundercats	3 – 4	OT	Monkton Wildcats	Monkton

February 16	Monkton Wildcats	0 – 8	Durham Thundercats	Durham

February 17	Durham Thundercats	4 – 5	OT	Monkton Wildcats	Monkton

February 23	Monkton Wildcats	1 – 3	Durham Thundercats	Durham

February 24	Durham Thundercats	4 – 0	Monkton Wildcats	Monkton

Durham wins series 4 – 2

===== (S5) Milverton Four Wheel Drives vs. (N8) Drayton Icemen =====
February 10	Drayton Icemen	3 – 2	OT	Milverton Four Wheel Drives	Milverton

February 11	Milverton Four Wheel Drives	8 – 3	Drayton Icemen	Drayton

February 17	Drayton Icemen	4 – 8	Milverton Four Wheel Drives	Milverton

February 18	Milverton Four Wheel Drives	4 – 6	Drayton Icemen	Drayton

February 24	Drayton Icemen	2 – 6	Milverton Four Wheel Drives	Milverton

February 25	Milverton Four Wheel Drives	3 – 2	OT	Drayton Icemen	Drayton

Milverton wins series 4 – 2

===== (N6) Ripley Wolves vs. (S7) Goderich Pirates =====
February 9	Goderich Pirates	5 – 6	Ripley Wolves	Ripley

February 10	Ripley Wolves	4 – 3	Goderich Pirates	Goderich

February 16	Goderich Pirates	4 – 5	OT	Ripley Wolves	Ripley

February 18	Ripley Wolves	6 – 3	Goderich Pirates	Goderich

Ripley wins series 4 – 0

===== (S6) Wingham Bulls vs. (N7) Mildmay Monarchs =====
February 9	Wingham Bulls	4 – 2	Mildmay Monarchs	Mildmay

February 11	Mildmay Monarchs	2 – 3	OT	Wingham Bulls	Wingham

February 16	Mildmay Monarchs	4 – 6	Wingham Bulls	Wingham

February 17	Wingham Bulls	4 – 1	Mildmay Monarchs	Mildmay

Wingham wins series 4 – 0

==== WOAA Senior A semi-finals ====
===== (1) Durham Thundercats vs. (4) Wingham Bulls =====
March 2	Wingham Bulls	1 – 4	Durham Thundercats	Durham

March 3	Durham Thundercats	6 – 0	Wingham Bulls	Wingham

March 9	Wingham Bulls	2 – 0	Durham Thundercats	Durham

March 10	Durham Thundercats	7 – 4	Wingham Bulls	Wingham

March 16	Wingham Bulls	1 – 4	Durham Thundercats	Durham

Durham wins series 4 – 1

===== (2) Ripley Wolves vs. (3) Milverton Four Wheel Drives =====
March 2	Milverton Four Wheel Drives	6 – 7	OT	Ripley Wolves	Ripley

March 3	Ripley Wolves	3 – 4	Milverton Four Wheel Drives	Milverton

March 9	Milverton Four Wheel Drives	9 – 5	Ripley Wolves	Ripley

March 10	Ripley Wolves	7 – 8	Milverton Four Wheel Drives	Milverton

March 16	Milverton Four Wheel Drives	3 – 5	Ripley Wolves	Ripley

March 17	Ripley Wolves	7 – 5	Milverton Four Wheel Drives	Milverton

March 18	Milverton Four Wheel Drives	2 – 4	Ripley Wolves	Ripley

Ripley wins series 4 – 3

==== WOAA Sr. A Championship ====
===== (1) Durham Thundercats vs. (2) Ripley Wolves =====
March 23	Ripley Wolves	4 – 5	OT	Durham Thundercats	Durham

March 24	Durham Thundercats	3 – 4	Ripley Wolves	Ripley

March 30	Ripley Wolves	3 – 1	Durham Thundercats	Durham

March 31	Durham Thundercats	8 – 6	Ripley Wolves	Ripley

April 5	Ripley Wolves	3 – 4	Durham Thundercats	Durham

April 6	Durham Thundercats	4 – 8	Ripley Wolves	Ripley

April 7	Ripley Wolves	1 – 5	Durham Thundercats	Durham

Durham wins series 4 – 3
