= 2004–05 WOAA Senior League season =

- League: WOAA Senior AA Hockey League
- Sport: Hockey
- Duration: Regular season October 2004 – January 2005; Playoffs; February 2005 – April 2005
- Teams: 18
- Finals champions: Sr. "AA" Champions - Elora Rocks; Sr. "A" Champions - Lucan-Ilderton Jets

WOAA Senior League seasons
- 2003–04 2005–06

The 2004–05 WOAA Senior League season was the 15th season of the WOAA Senior AA Hockey League. The league played a regular season schedule which began in October 2004 and concluded in January 2005. The post-season began in February 2005 and concluded in April 2005.

The Elora Rocks won the Sr. "AA" championship, defeating the Clinton Radars in five games. The Lucan-Ilderton Jets won the Sr. "A" championship.

== Team changes ==
- The Lucan-Ilderton Jets joined the league as an expansion team.

== Durham Thundercats illegal player ==
On January 10, 2005, locked out National Hockey League player Chris Neil of the Ottawa Senators suited up for a game with the Durham Thundercats.

Neil finished the game with one assist in a 5-4 victory over the Mildmay Monarchs.

The ruling from the league was that Neil was an illegal player because as a professional hockey player, he could not be insured under the league's policy in case if he injured an opponent.

Due to Neil being an illegal player, the Thundercats win was given to the Monarchs.

Neil finished the 2004-05 season with the Senators American Hockey League affiliate, the Binghamton Senators.

== Final standings ==
Note: GP = Games played; W = Wins; L= Losses; OTL = Overtime losses; GF = Goals for; GA = Goals against; Pts = Points; Green shade = Clinched "AA" playoff spot

Rank	WOAA standings	GP	W	L	T	OTL	Pts	GF	GA
1	Elora Rocks	25	19	4	2	0	40	180	84
2	Tavistock Royals	25	18	6	1	0	37	164	87
3	Shelburne Muskies	25	18	6	1	0	37	148	92
4	Hensall Sherwoods	25	17	5	2	1	37	131	77
5	Clinton Radars	25	17	5	0	3	37	123	80
6	Palmerston 81's	25	17	6	1	1	36	133	77
7	Milverton Four Wheel Drives	25	17	7	1	0	35	128	90
8	Lucan-Ilderton Jets	25	15	5	2	3	35	129	94
9	Durham Thundercats	25	15	6	2	2	34	126	88
10	Lucknow Lancers	25	15	7	3	0	33	138	93
11	Listowel Jets	25	8	14	1	2	19	107	125
12	Mildmay Monarchs	25	7	15	1	2	17	81	138
13	Monkton Wildcats	25	6	14	2	3	17	87	116
14	Georgian Bay River Rats	25	6	17	1	1	14	76	133
15	Wingham Spitfires	25	6	18	0	1	13	93	159
16	Ripley Wolves	25	6	18	0	1	13	84	172
17	Goderich Pirates	25	4	17	4	0	12	94	186
18	Brussels Crusaders	25	1	21	2	1	5	59	190

=== Scoring leaders ===
Note: GP = Games played; G = Goals; A = Assists; Pts = Points; PIM = Penalty minutes

Player	Team	GP	G	A	Pts	PIM
Mike Brito	Elora Rocks	25	22	41	63	13
Mark Stanley	Lucknow Lancers	23	28	21	49	8
Dave Meriam	Goderich Pirates	25	24	25	49	4
Joe MacKinnon	Lucknow Lancers	22	9	35	44	2
Brett Turner	Elora Rocks	20	25	18	43	21
Tyler Heimpel	Tavistock Royals	23	15	28	43	27
Ean Moffat	Lucknow Lancers	25	23	19	42	14
Gille Boudreau	Shelburne Muskies	23	17	25	42	57
Kory Dietz	Milverton Four Wheel Drives	23	10	32	42	40
Mike Woodley	Tavistock Royals	25	24	17	41	6

== Sr. "AA" playoffs ==
=== Sr. "AA" playoff bracket ===
Sr. "AA" qualifying
1	Elora	3
17	Goderich	0
8	Lucan-Ilderton	1
9	Durham	3
3	Shelburne	3
14	Georgian Bay	0
6	Palmerston	3
11	Listowel	0
2	Tavistock	3
15	Wingham	1
7	Milverton	3
10	Lancers	2
4	Hensall	3
13	Monkton	0
5	Clinton	3
12	Mildmay	0

Sr. "AA" quarter-finals
1	Elora	4
9	Durham	2
3	Shelburne	0
6	Palmerston	4
2	Tavistock	4
7	Milverton	0
4	Hensall	2
5	Clinton	4

Sr. "AA" semi-finals
1	Elora	4
6	Palmerston	1
2	Tavistock	2
5	Clinton	4

Sr. "AA" finals
1	Elora	4
5	Clinton	0

==== WOAA Sr. "AA" elimination round ====
===== (15) Wingham Spitfires vs. (18) Brussels Crusaders =====
February 4	Wingham Spitfires	7 – 4	Brussels Crusaders	Brussels

February 5	Brussels Crusaders	0 – 10	Wingham Spitfires	Wingham

Wingham wins series 2 – 0

===== (16) Ripley Wolves vs. (17) Goderich Pirates =====
February 4	Goderich Pirates	4 – 3	Ripley Wolves	Ripley

February 5	Goderich Pirates	1 – 4	Ripley Wolves	Ripley

Goderich wins series 2 – 0

==== WOAA Sr. "AA" qualifying round ====
===== (1) Elora Rocks vs. (17) Goderich Pirates =====
Note: Game three played in Fergus, Ontario.

February 11	Goderich Pirates	3 – 6	Elora Rocks	Elora

February 12	Elora Rocks	9 – 5	Goderich Pirates	Goderich

February 13	Goderich Pirates	2 – 8	Elora Rocks	Elora

Elora wins series 3 – 0

===== (2) Tavistock Royals vs. (15) Wingham Spitfires =====
February 12	Wingham Spitfires	3 – 9	Tavistock Royals	Tavistock

February 18	Tavistock Royals	3 – 5	Wingham Spitfires	Wingham

February 19	Wingham Spitfires	2 – 5	Tavistock Royals	Tavistock

February 20	Tavistock Royals	9 – 1	Wingham Spitfires	Wingham

Tavistock wins series 3 – 1

===== (3) Shelburne Muskies vs. (14) Georgian Bay River Rats =====
February 12	Georgian Bay River Rats	2 – 3	OT	Shelburne Muskies	Shelburne

February 13	Shelburne Muskies	6 – 3	Georgian Bay River Rats	Thornbury

February 19	Georgian Bay River Rats	2 – 3	Shelburne Muskies	Shelburne

Shelburne wins series 3 – 0

===== (4) Hensall Sherwoods vs. (13) Monkton Wildcats =====
February 9	Monkton Wildcats	3 – 4	Hensall Sherwoods	Hensall

February 11	Hensall Sherwoods	6 – 1	Monkton Wildcats	Monkton

February 12	Monkton Wildcats	4 – 5	OT	Hensall Sherwoods	Hensall

Hensall wins series 3 – 0

===== (5) Clinton Radars vs. (12) Mildmay Monarchs =====
February 11	Mildmay Monarchs	3 – 6	Clinton Radars	Clinton

February 12	Clinton Radars	5 – 2	Mildmay Monarchs	Mildmay

February 18	Mildmay Monarchs	1 – 6	Clinton Radars	Clinton

Clinton wins series 3 – 0

===== (6) Palmerston 81's vs. (11) Listowel Jets =====
February 11	Listowel Jets	5 – 6	OT	Palmerston 81's	Palmerston

February 12	Palmerston 81's	8 – 3	Listowel Jets	Listowel

February 19	Listowel Jets	1 – 6	Palmerston 81's	Palmerston

Palmerston wins series 3 – 0

===== (7) Milverton Four Wheel Drives vs. (10) Lucknow Lancers =====
February 11	Lucknow Lancers	3 – 5	Milverton Four Wheel Drives	Milverton

February 12	Milverton Four Wheel Drives	2 – 1	OT	Lucknow Lancers	Lucknow

February 18	Lucknow Lancers	6 – 4	Milverton Four Wheel Drives	Milverton

February 20	Milverton Four Wheel Drives	3 – 7	Lucknow Lancers	Lucknow

February 21	Lucknow Lancers	4 – 7	Milverton Four Wheel Drives	Milverton

Milverton wins series 3 – 2

===== (8) Lucan-Ilderton Jets vs. (9) Durham Thundercats =====
February 4	Durham Thundercats	3 – 2	Lucan-Ilderton Jets	Lucan

February 11	Lucan-Ilderton Jets	4 – 3	Durham Thundercats	Durham

February 12	Durham Thundercats	3 – 2	OT	Lucan-Ilderton Jets	Lucan

February 18	Lucan-Ilderton Jets	3 – 4	OT	Durham Thundercats	Durham

Durham wins series 3 – 1

==== WOAA Sr. "AA" quarter-finals ====
===== (1) Elora Rocks vs. (9) Durham Thundercats =====
February 25	Durham Thundercats	5 – 8	Elora Rocks	Elora

February 26	Elora Rocks	8 – 2	Durham Thundercats	Durham

March 4	Durham Thundercats	2 – 5	Elora Rocks	Elora

March 5	Elora Rocks	2 – 5	Durham Thundercats	Durham

March 11	Durham Thundercats	3 – 2	Elora Rocks	Elora

March 12	Elora Rocks	5 – 3	Durham Thundercats	Durham

Elora wins series 4 – 2

===== (2) Tavistock Royals vs. (7) Milverton Four Wheel Drives =====
February 26	Milverton Four Wheel Drives	4 – 5	OT	Tavistock Royals	Tavistock

February 27	Tavistock Royals	5 – 1	Milverton Four Wheel Drives	Milverton

March 4	Milverton Four Wheel Drives	2 – 4	Tavistock Royals	Tavistock

March 5	Tavistock Royals	2 – 1	OT	Milverton Four Wheel Drives	Milverton

Milverton wins series 4 – 0

===== (3) Shelburne Muskies vs. (6) Palmerston 81's =====
February 26	Palmerston 81's	5 – 4	Shelburne Muskies	Shelburne

February 27	Shelburne Muskies	2 – 7	Palmerston 81's	Palmerston

March 4	Palmerston 81's	7 – 1	Shelburne Muskies	Shelburne

March 5	Shelburne Muskies	5 – 10	Palmerston 81's	Palmerston

Palmerston wins series 4 – 0

===== (4) Hensall Sherwoods vs. (5) Clinton Radars =====
February 23	Clinton Radars	5 – 4	Hensall Sherwoods	Hensall

February 25	Hensall Sherwoods	4 – 2	Clinton Radars	Clinton

February 26	Clinton Radars	5 – 1	Hensall Sherwoods	Hensall

March 4	Hensall Sherwoods	2 – 1	Clinton Radars	Clinton

March 5	Clinton Radars	5 – 2	Hensall Sherwoods	Hensall

March 11	Hensall Sherwoods	4 – 5	Clinton Radars	Clinton

Clinton wins series 4 – 2

==== WOAA Sr. "AA" semi-finals ====
===== (1) Elora Rocks vs. (6) Palmerston 81's =====
Note: Game three played in Fergus, Ontario.

March 18	Palmerston 81's	4 – 3	Elora Rocks	Elora

March 19	Elora Rocks	5 – 3	Palmerston 81's	Palmerston

March 25	Palmerston 81's	3 – 5	Elora Rocks	Elora

March 26	Elora Rocks	5 – 1	Palmerston 81's	Palmerston

March 30	Palmerston 81's	2 – 8	Elora Rocks	Elora

Elora wins series 4 – 1

===== (2) Tavistock Royals vs. (5) Clinton Radars =====
March 19	Clinton Radars	1 – 5	Tavistock Royals	Tavistock

March 20	Tavistock Royals	2 – 4	Clinton Radars	Clinton

March 25	Clinton Radars	5 – 1	Tavistock Royals	Tavistock

March 26	Tavistock Royals	3 – 7	Clinton Radars	Clinton

March 27	Clinton Radars	2 – 8	Tavistock Royals	Tavistock

April 1	Tavistock Royals	2 – 4	Clinton Radars	Clinton

Clinton wins series 4 – 2

==== WOAA Sr. "AA" finals ====
===== (1) Elora Rocks vs. (5) Clinton Radars =====
Note: Elora home games were played in Fergus, Ontario.

April 6	Clinton Radars	2 – 3	OT	Elora Rocks	Fergus

April 8	Elora Rocks	6 – 4	Clinton Radars	Clinton

April 10	Clinton Radars	4 – 7	Elora Rocks	Fergus

April 15	Elora Rocks	5 – 3	Clinton Radars	Clinton

Elora wins series 4 – 0

== Sr. "A" playoffs ==
=== Sr. "A" playoff bracket ===
Sr. "A" quarter-finals
8	Lucan-Ilderton	4
17	Goderich	1
12	Mildmay	1
13	Monkton	4
10	Lucknow	4
15	Wingham	0
11	Listowel	4
14	Georgian Bay	1

Sr. "A" semi-finals
8	Lucan-Ilderton	4
13	Monkton	1
10	Lucknow	4
11	Listowel	0

Sr. "A" finals
8	Lucan-Ilderton	4
10	Lucknow	1

==== WOAA Sr. "A" quarter-finals ====
===== (8) Lucan-Ilderton Jets vs. (17) Goderich Pirates =====
February 26	Goderich Pirates	4 – 3	Lucan-Ilderton Jets	Lucan

February 27	Lucan-Ilderton Jets	5 – 4	Goderich Pirates	Goderich

March 5	Goderich Pirates	2 – 10	Lucan-Ilderton Jets	Lucan

March 6	Lucan-Ilderton Jets	5 – 1	Goderich Pirates	Goderich

March 12	Goderich Pirates	1 – 10	Lucan-Ilderton Jets	Lucan

Lucan-Ilderton wins series 4 – 1

===== (10) Lucknow Lancers vs. (15) Wingham Spitfires =====
February 25	Wingham Spitfires	3 – 6	Lucknow Lancers	Lucknow

February 26	Lucknow Lancers	6 – 3	Wingham Spitfires	Wingham

March 4	Wingham Spitfires	4 – 13	Lucknow Lancers	Lucknow

March 6	Lucknow Lancers	5 – 4	Wingham Spitfires	Wingham

Lucknow wins series 4 – 0

===== (11) Listowel Jets vs. (14) Georgian Bay River Rats =====
February 26	Listowel Jets	6 – 5	Georgian Bay River Rats	Thornbury

February 27	Georgian Bay River Rats	3 – 6	Listowel Jets	Listowel

March 5	Listowel Jets	4 – 8	Georgian Bay River Rats	Thornbury

March 6	Georgian Bay River Rats	2 – 5	Listowel Jets	Listowel

March 12	Georgian Bay River Rats	3 – 6	Listowel Jets	Listowel

Listowel wins series 4 – 1

===== (12) Mildmay Monarchs vs. (13) Monkton Wildcats =====
February 25	Monkton Wildcats	5 – 3	Mildmay Monarchs	Mildmay

February 26	Mildmay Monarchs	9 – 5	Monkton Wildcats	Monkton

March 4	Monkton Wildcats	5 – 3	Mildmay Monarchs	Mildmay

March 5	Mildmay Monarchs	4 – 6	Monkton Wildcats	Monkton

March 11	Monkton Wildcats	5 – 2	Mildmay Monarchs	Mildmay

Monkton wins series 4 – 1

==== WOAA Sr. "A" semi-finals ====
===== (8) Lucan-Ilderton Jets vs. (13) Monkton Wildcats =====
March 19	Monkton Wildcats	6 – 5	OT	Lucan-Ilderton Jets	Lucan

March 24	Lucan-Ilderton Jets	13 – 2	Monkton Wildcats	Monkton

March 26	Monkton Wildcats	1 – 7	Lucan-Ilderton Jets	Lucan

April 1	Lucan-Ilderton Jets	8 – 2	Monkton Wildcats	Monkton

April 3	Monkton Wildcats	3 – 4	Lucan-Ilderton Jets	Lucan

Lucan-Ilderton wins series 4 – 1

===== (10) Lucknow Lancers vs. (11) Listowel Jets =====
March 18	Listowel Jets	1 – 6	Lucknow Lancers	Lucknow

March 20	Lucknow Lancers	5 – 4	OT	Listowel Jets	Listowel

March 26	Listowel Jets	3 – 9	Lucknow Lancers	Lucknow

April 1	Lucknow Lancers	5 – 4	OT	Listowel Jets	Listowel

Lucknow wins series 4 – 0

==== WOAA Sr. "A" finals ====
===== (8) Lucan-Ilderton Jets vs. (10) Lucknow Lancers =====
April 8	Lucknow Lancers	3 – 6	Lucan-Ilderton Jets	Lucan

April 9	Lucan-Ilderton Jets	4 – 3	OT	Lucknow Lancers	Lucknow

April 10	Lucknow Lancers	1 – 7	Lucan-Ilderton Jets	Lucan

April 15	Lucan-Ilderton Jets	4 – 5	Lucknow Lancers	Lucknow

April 16	Lucknow Lancers	0 – 3	Lucan-Ilderton Jets	Lucan

Lucan-Ilderton wins series 4 – 1
