= 2002–03 WOAA Senior League season =

- League: WOAA Senior AA Hockey League
- Sport: Hockey
- Duration: Regular season October 2002 – January 2003; Playoffs; February 2003 – April 2003
- Teams: 15
- Finals champions: Sr. "AA" Champions - Palmerston 81's Sr. "A" Champions - Wingham Spitfires

WOAA Senior League seasons
- 2001–02 2003–04

The 2002–03 WOAA Senior League season was the 13th season of the WOAA Senior AA Hockey League. The league played a regular season schedule which began in October 2002 and concluded in January 2003. The post-season began in February 2003 and concluded in April 2003.

The Palmerston 81's won the Sr. "AA" championship, defeating the Hensall Sherwoods in six games. The Wingham Spitfires won the Sr. "A" championship.

== Team changes ==
- The league reformatted and no divisions were used.
- The Wiarton Devils folded.
- The Brussels Crusaders returned to the league after a league of absence.
- The Listowel Jets joined the league as an expansion team.

== Final standings ==
Note: GP = Games played; W = Wins; L= Losses; OTL = Overtime losses; GF = Goals for; GA = Goals against; Pts = Points; Green shade = Clinched "AA" playoff spot

Rank	WOAA standings	GP	W	L	T	OTL	Pts	GF	GA
1	Durham Thundercats	24	22	2	0	0	44	211	66
2	Clinton Radars	24	18	6	0	0	36	141	85
3	Palmerston 81's	24	17	6	0	1	35	112	80
4	Lucknow Lancers	24	16	6	0	2	34	129	85
5	Hensall Sherwoods	24	16	8	0	0	32	146	80
6	Tavistock Royals	24	15	7	1	1	32	151	100
7	Milverton Four Wheel Drives	24	15	8	0	1	31	123	81
8	Shelburne Muskies	24	14	9	1	0	29	146	99
9	Elora Rocks	24	12	10	1	1	26	107	93
10	Monkton Wildcats	24	9	14	0	1	19	97	115
11	Wingham Spitfires	24	8	13	0	3	19	107	149
12	Georgian Bay River Rats	24	7	15	2	0	16	103	168
13	Goderich Pirates	24	4	19	1	0	9	74	192
14	Listowel Jets	24	3	20	0	1	7	64	153
15	Brussels Crusaders	24	0	20	2	2	4	49	214

=== Scoring leaders ===
Note: GP = Games played; G = Goals; A = Assists; Pts = Points; PIM = Penalty minutes

Player	Team	GP	G	A	Pts	PIM
Jeremy Franks	Durham Thundercats	24	35	31	66	13
Rob LeBlanc	Durham Thundercats	20	22	36	58	33
Tyler Heimpel	Tavistock Royals	23	25	31	56	70
Brad Cripps	Durham Thundercats	23	23	30	53	39
Sean Burton	Goderich Pirates	24	19	32	51	2
Darren MacDonald	Lucknow Lancers	24	19	31	50	20
Sean McCann	Hensall Sherwoods	22	17	33	50	24
Scott Henderson	Clinton Radars	24	25	22	47	5
Jason Walsh	Tavistock Royals	23	22	23	45	53
Jon MacKinnon	Lucknow Lancers	24	18	27	45	6

== Sr. "AA" playoffs ==
=== Sr. "AA" playoff bracket ===
Sr. "AA" quarter-finals
1	Durham	4
8	Shelburne	1
4	Lucknow	1
5	Hensall	4
2	Clinton	4
7	Milverton	3
3	Palmerston	4
6	Tavistock	2

Sr. "AA" semi-finals
1	Durham	1
5	Hensall	4
2	Clinton	3
3	Palmerston	4

Sr. "AA" finals
5	Hensall	3
3	Palmerston	4

==== WOAA Sr. "AA" quarter-finals ====
===== (1) Durham Thundercats vs. (8) Shelburne Muskies =====
February 7	Shelburne Muskies	9 – 5	Durham Thundercats	Durham

February 8	Durham Thundercats	7 – 3	Shelburne Muskies	Shelburne

February 14	Shelburne Muskies	1 – 5	Durham Thundercats	Durham

February 15	Durham Thundercats	7 – 3	Shelburne Muskies	Shelburne

February 21	Shelburne Muskies	2 – 3	Durham Thundercats	Durham

Durham wins series 4 – 1

===== (2) Clinton Radars vs. (7) Milverton Four Wheel Drives =====
February 7	Milverton Four Wheel Drives	3 – 7	Clinton Radars	Clinton

February 8	Clinton Radars	5 – 1	Milverton Four Wheel Drives	Milverton

February 14	Milverton Four Wheel Drives	6 – 7	OT	Clinton Radars	Clinton

February 15	Clinton Radars	1 – 4	Milverton Four Wheel Drives	Milverton

February 21	Milverton Four Wheel Drives	6 – 5	OT	Clinton Radars	Clinton

February 22	Clinton Radars	1 – 6	Milverton Four Wheel Drives	Milverton

February 23	Milverton Four Wheel Drives	5 – 7	Clinton Radars	Clinton

Clinton wins series 4 – 3

===== (3) Palmerston 81's vs. (6) Tavistock Royals =====
February 7	Tavistock Royals	5 – 2	Palmerston 81's	Palmerston

February 12	Palmerston 81's	5 – 4	Tavistock Royals	Tavistock

February 14	Tavistock Royals	2 – 7	Palmerston 81's	Palmerston

February 15	Palmerston 81's	3 – 4	Tavistock Royals	Tavistock

February 20	Tavistock Royals	3 – 4	Palmerston 81's	Palmerston

February 22	Palmerston 81's	3 – 2	Tavistock Royals	Tavistock

Palmerston wins series 4 – 2

===== (4) Lucknow Lancers vs. (5) Hensall Sherwoods =====
February 8	Hensall Sherwoods	3 – 2	Lucknow Lancers	Lucknow

February 12	Lucknow Lancers	1 – 2	Hensall Sherwoods	Hensall

February 14	Hensall Sherwoods	2 – 3	Lucknow Lancers	Lucknow

February 15	Lucknow Lancers	0 – 1	OT	Hensall Sherwoods	Hensall

February 21	Hensall Sherwoods	6 – 3	Lucknow Lancers	Lucknow

Hensall wins series 4 – 1

==== WOAA Sr. "AA" semi-finals ====
===== (1) Durham Thundercats vs. (5) Hensall Sherwoods =====
February 28	Hensall Sherwoods	5 – 2	Durham Thundercats	Durham

March 1	Durham Thundercats	4 – 6	Hensall Sherwoods	Hensall

March 7	Hensall Sherwoods	4 – 2	Durham Thundercats	Durham

March 8	Durham Thundercats	4 – 0	Hensall Sherwoods	Hensall

March 14	Durham Thundercats	3 – 7	Hensall Sherwoods	Hensall

Hensall wins series 4 – 1

===== (2) Clinton Radars vs. (3) Palmerston 81's =====
February 28	Palmerston 81's	5 – 7	Clinton Radars	Clinton

March 2	Clinton Radars	6 – 4	Palmerston 81's	Palmerston

March 7	Palmerston 81's	5 – 1	Clinton Radars	Clinton

March 11	Clinton Radars	7 – 2	Palmerston 81's	Palmerston

March 14	Palmerston 81's	6 – 3	Clinton Radars	Clinton

March 15	Clinton Radars	3 – 6	Palmerston 81's	Palmerston

March 16	Palmerston 81's	2 – 1	Clinton Radars	Clinton

Palmerston wins series 4 – 3

==== WOAA Sr. "AA" finals ====
===== (3) Palmerston 81's vs. (5) Hensall Sherwoods =====
March 21	Hensall Sherwoods	3 – 4	Palmerston 81's	Palmerston

March 23	Palmerston 81's	3 – 4	Hensall Sherwoods	Hensall

March 29	Hensall Sherwoods	3 – 5	Palmerston 81's	Palmerston

April 2	Palmerston 81's	1 – 4	Hensall Sherwoods	Hensall

April 5	Hensall Sherwoods	4 – 7	Palmerston 81's	Palmerston

April 10	Palmerston 81's	3 – 4	Hensall Sherwoods	Hensall

April 11	Hensall Sherwoods	1 – 2	Palmerston 81's	Palmerston

Palmerston wins series 4 – 3

=== Sr. "AA" tier II playoff bracket ===
Tier II semi-finals
1	Lucknow	2
4	Shelburne	4
2	Tavistock	3
3	Milverton	0

Tier II finals
4	Shelburne	3
2	Tavistock	0

==== WOAA Sr. "AA" tier II semi-finals ====
===== (1) Lucknow Lancers vs. (4) Shelburne Muskies =====
February 28	Shelburne Muskies	9 – 7	Lucknow Lancers	Lucknow

March 1	Lucknow Lancers	6 – 5	Shelburne Muskies	Shelburne

March 7	Shelburne Muskies	2 – 5	Lucknow Lancers	Lucknow

March 8	Lucknow Lancers	1 – 3	Shelburne Muskies	Shelburne

March 14	Shelburne Muskies	6 – 4	Lucknow Lancers	Lucknow

March 15	Lucknow Lancers	3 – 4	OT	Shelburne Muskies	Shelburne

Shelburne wins series 4 – 2

===== (2) Tavistock Royals vs. (3) Milverton Four Wheel Drives =====
March 1	Milverton Four Wheel Drives	6 – 13	Tavistock Royals	Tavistock

March 7	Tavistock Royals	15 – 14	Milverton Four Wheel Drives	Milverton

March 8	Milverton Four Wheel Drives	10 – 17	Tavistock Royals	Tavistock

Tavistock wins series 3 – 0

==== WOAA Sr. "AA" tier II finals ====
===== (2) Tavistock Royals vs. (4) Shelburne Muskies =====
Note: Shelburne home game was played in Grand Valley, Ontario.

March 23	Tavistock Royals	4 – 7	Shelburne Muskies	Grand Valley

March 29	Shelburne Muskies	5 – 4	Tavistock Royals	Tavistock

March 30	Shelburne Muskies	8 – 5	Tavistock Royals	Tavistock

Shelburne wins series 3 – 0

== Sr. "A" playoffs ==
=== Sr. "A" playoff bracket ===
Sr. "A" quarter-finals
9	Elora	4
15	Brussels	0
12	Georgian Bay	3
10	Monkton	4
14	Listowel	3
11	Wingham	3
13	Goderich	0

Sr. "A" semi-finals
9	Elora	2
12	Georgian Bay	4
10	Monkton	0
11	Wingham	4

Sr. "A" finals
12	Georgian Bay	0
11	Wingham	4

==== WOAA Sr. "A" quarter-finals ====
===== (9) Elora Rocks vs. (15) Brussels Crusaders =====
February 7	Brussels Crusaders	4 – 7	Elora Rocks	Elora

February 9	Elora Rocks	3 – 2	Brussels Crusaders	Brussels

February 14	Brussels Crusaders	1 – 9	Elora Rocks	Elora

February 15	Elora Rocks	4 – 0	Brussels Crusaders	Brussels

Elora wins series 4 – 0

===== (10) Monkton Wildcats vs. (14) Listowel Jets =====
February 8	Monkton Wildcats	3 – 4	Listowel Jets	Listowel

February 12	Listowel Jets	1 – 6	Monkton Wildcats	Monkton

February 14	Listowel Jets	3 – 2	OT	Monkton Wildcats	Monkton

February 16	Monkton Wildcats	6 – 7	Listowel Jets	Listowel

February 21	Listowel Jets	1 – 5	Monkton Wildcats	Monkton

February 22	Monkton Wildcats	4 – 3	OT	Listowel Jets	Listowel

February 25	Listowel Jets	0 – 1	Monkton Wildcats	Monkton

Monkton wins series 4 – 3

===== (11) Wingham Spitfires vs. (12) Georgian Bay River Rats vs. (13) Goderich Pirates =====
Rank	Sr. "A" quarter-finals	GP	W	L	Pts	GF	GA
1	Wingham Spitfires	4	3	1	6	24	13
2	Georgian Bay River Rats	4	3	1	6	25	17
3	Goderich Pirates	4	0	4	0	11	30

==== WOAA Sr. "A" semi-finals ====
===== (9) Elora Rocks vs. (12) Georgian Bay River Rats =====
February 28	Georgian Bay River Rats	4 – 6	Elora Rocks	Elora

March 1	Elora Rocks	3 – 4	Georgian Bay River Rats	Thornbury

March 7	Georgian Bay River Rats	1 – 0	Elora Rocks	Elora

March 8	Elora Rocks	5 – 4	Georgian Bay River Rats	Thornbury

March 14	Georgian Bay River Rats	3 – 2	Elora Rocks	Elora

March 15	Elora Rocks	3 – 5	Georgian Bay River Rats	Thornbury

Georgian Bay wins series 4 – 2

===== (10) Monkton Wildcats vs. (11) Wingham Spitfires =====
February 28	Wingham Spitfires	6 – 5	OT	Monkton Wildcats	Monkton

March 1	Monkton Wildcats	0 – 4	Wingham Spitfires	Wingham

March 7	Wingham Spitfires	5 – 3	Monkton Wildcats	Monkton

March 14	Monkton Wildcats	2 – 3	OT	Wingham Spitfires	Wingham

Wingham wins series 4 – 0

==== WOAA Sr. "A" finals ====
===== (11) Wingham Spitfires vs. (12) Georgian Bay River Rats =====
March 21	Georgian Bay River Rats	3 – 4	OT	Wingham Spitfires	Wingham

March 22	Wingham Spitfires	5 – 2	Georgian Bay River Rats	Thornbury

March 28	Georgian Bay River Rats	2 – 7	Wingham Spitfires	Wingham

March 30	Wingham Spitfires	5 – 2	Georgian Bay River Rats	Thornbury

Wingham wins series 4 – 0

=== Sr. "A" tier II playoff bracket ===
Tier II round-robin
13	Goderich	2
14	Listowel	3
15	Brussels	1

Tier II finals
13	Goderich	1
14	Listowel	2

==== WOAA Sr. "A" tier II semi-finals ====
===== (13) Goderich Pirates vs. (14) Listowel Jets vs. (15) Brussels Crusaders =====
Rank	Sr. "A" tier II semi-finals	GP	W	L	Pts	GF	GA
1	Listowel Jets	4	3	1	6	25	18
2	Goderich Pirates	4	2	2	4	32	23
3	Brussels Crusaders	4	1	3	2	20	36

==== WOAA Sr. "A" tier II finals ====
===== (13) Goderich Pirates vs. (14) Listowel Jets =====
March 21	Listowel Jets	2 – 5	Goderich Pirates	Goderich

March 22	Goderich Pirates	5 – 7	Listowel Jets	Listowel

March 23	Listowel Jets	7 – 4	Goderich Pirates	Goderich

Listowel wins series 2 – 1
