= 2005–06 WOAA Senior League season =

- League: WOAA Senior AA Hockey League
- Sport: Hockey
- Duration: Regular season October 2005 – January 2006; Playoffs; February 2006 – April 2006
- Teams: 18
- Finals champions: Sr. AA - Durham Thundercats; Sr. A - Palmerston 81's

WOAA Senior League seasons
- 2004–05 2006–07

The 2005–06 WOAA Senior League season was the 16th season of the WOAA Senior AA Hockey League. The league played a 25-game regular season which began in October 2005 and concluded in January 2006. The post-season began in February 2006 and concluded in April 2006.

The Durham Thundercats won the WOAA Senior AA Hockey Championship, defeating the Elora Rocks in the final round of the playoffs.

== Team changes ==
- The Brussels Crusaders leave the league and fold.
- The Drayton Icemen join the league as an expansion team.
- The Wingham Spitfires are renamed the Wingham Bulls.

== Regular season ==
=== Final standings ===
Note: GP = Games played; W = Wins; L= Losses; OTL = Overtime losses; GF = Goals for; GA = Goals against; Pts = Points; Green shade = Clinched "AA" playoff spot

Rank	WOAA standings	GP	W	L	OTL	SL	Pts	GF	GA
1	Durham Thundercats	25	22	3	0	0	44	171	76
2	Elora Rocks	25	21	3	0	1	43	176	76
3	Shelburne Muskies	25	19	3	1	2	41	137	76
4	Lucknow Lancers	25	18	6	1	0	37	133	79
5	Tavistock Royals	25	18	6	0	1	37	150	84
6	Hensall Sherwoods	25	18	6	1	0	37	124	85
7	Lucan-Ilderton Jets	25	18	6	0	1	37	123	85
8	Clinton Radars	25	17	7	1	0	35	114	88
9	Palmerston 81's	25	15	8	1	1	32	114	79
10	Milverton Four Wheel Drives	25	15	9	1	0	31	121	102
11	Monkton Wildcats	25	8	17	0	0	16	83	131
12	Goderich Pirates	25	8	17	0	0	16	105	145
13	Georgian Bay River Rats	25	7	16	1	1	16	96	146
14	Ripley Wolves	25	7	18	0	0	14	116	160
15	Mildmay Monarchs	25	5	18	1	1	12	80	125
16	Wingham Bulls	25	5	18	1	1	12	87	149
17	Listowel Jets	25	3	21	1	0	7	80	161
18	Drayton Icemen	25	1	24	0	0	2	60	223

=== Scoring leaders ===
Note: GP = Games played; G = Goals; A = Assists; Pts = Points; PIM = Penalty minutes

Player	Team	GP	G	A	Pts	PIM
Rod Bauman	Elora Rocks	23	17	36	53	71
Travis Van Gaver	Ripley Wolves	22	35	17	52	8
Nick Gibson	Milverton Four Wheel Drives	25	24	27	51	20
Jeremy Machin	Elora Rocks	25	26	23	49	16
Keith MacMillan	Durham Thundercats	25	14	35	49	10
Kevin Shoebridge	Georgian Bay River Rats	24	20	25	45	31
Mike Woodley	Tavistock Royals	22	23	21	44	2
Justin Shoebridge	Georgian Bay River Rats	24	19	25	44	38
Mark Van Dooren	Clinton Radars	24	17	27	44	68
Mike Brito	Elora Rocks	24	19	24	43	40

== Playoffs ==
=== WOAA Senior "AA" Hockey playoffs ===
==== Elimination round ====
===== (15) Mildmay Monarchs vs. (18) Drayton Icemen =====
February 3	Drayton Icemen	4 – 7	Mildmay Monarchs	Mildmay

February 4	Mildmay Monarchs	9 – 4	Drayton Icemen	Drayton

Mildmay wins series 2 – 0

===== (16) Wingham Bulls vs. (17) Listowel Jets =====
February 4	Wingham Bulls	4 – 6	Listowel Jets	Listowel

February 5	Listowel Jets	3 – 4	OT	Wingham Bulls	Wingham

February 8	Listowel Jets	4 – 3	OT	Wingham Bulls	Wingham

Listowel wins series 2 – 1

==== Sr. AA playoff bracket ====
Sr. AA qualifying
1	Durham	3
17	Listowel	0
8	Clinton	3
9	Palmerston	1
4	Lucknow	3
13	Georgian Bay	0
5	Tavistock	3
12	Goderich	0
2	Elora	3
15	Mildmay	0
7	Lucan-Ilderton	3
10	Milverton	0
3	Shelburne	3
14	Ripley	0
6	Hensall	3
11	Monkton	0

Sr. AA quarter-finals
1	Durham	4
8	Clinton	1
4	Lucknow	4
5	Tavistock	3
2	Elora	4
7	Lucan-Ilderton	0
3	Shelburne	4
6	Hensall	3

Sr. AA semi-finals
1	Durham	4
4	Lucknow	0
2	Elora	4
3	Shelburne	2

Sr. AA finals
1	Durham	4
2	Elora	1

==== WOAA Senior AA qualifying series ====
===== (1) Durham Thundercats vs. (16) Listowel Jets =====
February 10	Listowel Jets	5 – 10	Durham Thundercats	Durham

February 11	Durham Thundercats	9 – 0	Listowel Jets	Listowel

February 17	Listowel Jets	2 – 9	Durham Thundercats	Durham

Durham wins series 3 – 0

===== (2) Elora Rocks vs. (15) Mildmay Monarchs =====
February 10	Mildmay Monarchs	3 – 8	Elora Rocks	Elora

February 15	Mildmay Monarchs	1 – 6	Elora Rocks	Elora

February 17	Elora Rocks	12 – 1	Mildmay Monarchs	Mildmay

Elora wins series 3 – 0

===== (3) Shelburne Muskies vs. (14) Ripley Wolves =====
February 10	Ripley Wolves	5 – 7	Shelburne Muskies	Shelburne

February 11	Shelburne Muskies	6 – 4	Ripley Wolves	Ripley

February 18	Ripley Wolves	3 – 6	Shelburne Muskies	Shelburne

Shelburne wins series 3 – 0

===== (4) Lucknow Lancers vs. (13) Georgian Bay River Rats =====
February 10	Georgian Bay River Rats	1 – 10	Lucknow Lancers	Lucknow

February 11	Lucknow Lancers	5 – 4	OT	Georgian Bay River Rats	Thornbury

February 18	Georgian Bay River Rats	1 – 7	Lucknow Lancers	Lucknow

Lucknow wins series 3 – 0

===== (5) Tavistock Royals vs. (12) Goderich Pirates =====
February 10	Tavistock Royals	3 – 1	Goderich Pirates	Goderich

February 11	Goderich Pirates	3 – 11	Tavistock Royals	Tavistock

February 18	Goderich Pirates	1 – 4	Tavistock Royals	Tavistock

Tavistock wins series 3 – 0

===== (6) Hensall Sherwoods vs. (11) Monkton Wildcats =====
February 10	Hensall Sherwoods	6 – 3	Monkton Wildcats	Monkton

February 11	Monkton Wildcats	3 – 4	OT	Hensall Sherwoods	Hensall

February 17	Monkton Wildcats	1 – 9	Hensall Sherwoods	Hensall

Hensall wins series 3 – 0

===== (7) Lucan-Ilderton Jets vs. (10) Milverton Four Wheel Drives =====
February 11	Milverton Four Wheel Drives	1 – 4	Lucan-Ilderton Jets	Lucan

February 12	Lucan-Ilderton Jets	4 – 3	Milverton Four Wheel Drives	Milverton

February 18	Lucan-Ilderton Jets	1 – 0	Milverton Four Wheel Drives	Milverton

Lucan-Ilderton wins series 3 – 0

===== (8) Clinton Radars vs. (9) Palmerston 81's =====
February 10	Palmerston 81's	2 – 3	OT	Clinton Radars	Clinton

February 12	Clinton Radars	3 – 2	Palmerston 81's	Palmerston

February 19	Palmerston 81's	4 – 1	Clinton Radars	Clinton

February 22	Clinton Radars	4 – 2	Palmerston 81's	Palmerston

Clinton wins series 3 – 1

==== WOAA Senior AA quarter-finals ====
===== (1) Durham Thundercats vs. (8) Clinton Radars =====
February 24	Clinton Radars	3 – 2	OT	Durham Thundercats	Durham

February 25	Durham Thundercats	6 – 3	Clinton Radars	Clinton

March 3	Clinton Radars	3 – 5	Durham Thundercats	Durham

March 4	Durham Thundercats	3 – 0	Clinton Radars	Clinton

March 10	Clinton Radars	3 – 7	Durham Thundercats	Durham

Durham wins series 4 – 1

===== (2) Elora Rocks vs. (7) Lucan-Ilderton Jets =====
February 24	Lucan-Ilderton Jets	2 – 6	Elora Rocks	Elora

February 25	Elora Rocks	4 – 3	Lucan-Ilderton Jets	Lucan

March 3	Lucan-Ilderton Jets	2 – 7	Elora Rocks	Elora

March 4	Elora Rocks	4 – 3	Lucan-Ilderton Jets	Lucan

Elora wins series 4 – 0

===== (3) Shelburne Muskies vs. (6) Hensall Sherwoods =====
February 24	Hensall Sherwoods	5 – 6	Shelburne Muskies	Shelburne

February 25	Shelburne Muskies	2 – 4	Hensall Sherwoods	Hensall

March 3	Hensall Sherwoods	4 – 3	OT	Shelburne Muskies	Shelburne

March 4	Shelburne Muskies	5 – 4	2OT	Hensall Sherwoods	Hensall

March 10	Hensall Sherwoods	3 – 2	Shelburne Muskies	Shelburne

March 11	Shelburne Muskies	7 – 4	Hensall Sherwoods	Hensall

March 14	Hensall Sherwoods	3 – 4	Shelburne Muskies	Shelburne

Shelburne wins series 4 – 3

===== (4) Lucknow Lancers vs. (5) Tavistock Royals =====
February 25	Tavistock Royals	4 – 1	Lucknow Lancers	Lucknow

February 26	Lucknow Lancers	4 – 5	Tavistock Royals	Tavistock

March 3	Tavistock Royals	1 – 5	Lucknow Lancers	Lucknow

March 4	Lucknow Lancers	5 – 2	Tavistock Royals	Tavistock

March 10	Tavistock Royals	4 – 3	OT	Lucknow Lancers	Lucknow

March 11	Lucknow Lancers	6 – 2	Tavistock Royals	Tavistock

March 12	Tavistock Royals	1 – 4	Lucknow Lancers	Lucknow

Lucknow wins series 4 – 3

==== WOAA Senior AA semi-finals ====
===== (1) Durham Thundercats vs. (4) Lucknow Lancers =====
March 17	Lucknow Lancers	2 – 3	Durham Thundercats	Durham

March 18	Durham Thundercats	4 – 0	Lucknow Lancers	Lucknow

March 24	Lucknow Lancers	2 – 4	Durham Thundercats	Durham

March 25	Durham Thundercats	6 – 3	Lucknow Lancers	Lucknow

Durham wins series 4 – 0

===== (2) Elora Rocks vs. (3) Shelburne Muskies =====
Note: Game three played in Fergus, Ontario.

March 17	Shelburne Muskies	3 – 6	Elora Rocks	Elora

March 18	Elora Rocks	3 – 6	Shelburne Muskies	Shelburne

March 24	Shelburne Muskies	7 – 4	Elora Rocks	Elora

March 26	Elora Rocks	5 – 4	Shelburne Muskies	Shelburne

March 31	Shelburne Muskies	5 – 6	OT	Elora Rocks	Elora

April 1	Elora Rocks	5 – 2	Shelburne Muskies	Shelburne

Elora wins series 4 – 2

==== WOAA Sr. AA Championship ====
===== (1) Durham Thundercats vs. (2) Elora Rocks =====
April 7	Elora Rocks	2 – 6	Durham Thundercats	Durham

April 8	Durham Thundercats	2 – 1	Elora Rocks	Elora

April 13	Elora Rocks	5 – 3	Durham Thundercats	Durham

April 14	Durham Thundercats	8 – 6	Elora Rocks	Elora

April 15	Elora Rocks	2 – 5	Durham Thundercats	Durham

Durham wins series 4 – 1

=== WOAA Senior "A" Hockey playoffs ===
The eight teams who lost in the Senior AA qualifying round participated in the Senior A playoffs.

==== Sr. A playoff bracket ====
Sr. A quarter-finals
9	Palmerston	4
17	Listowel	3
12	Goderich	4
13	Georgian Bay	3
10	Milverton	4
15	Mildmay	0
11	Monkton	4
14	Ripley	2

Sr. A semi-finals
9	Palmerston	4
12	Goderich	0
10	Milverton	2
11	Monkton	4

Sr. A finals
9	Palmerston	4
11	Monkton	0

==== WOAA Senior A quarter-finals ====
===== (9) Palmerston 81's vs. (16) Listowel Jets =====
February 26	Listowel Jets	3 – 5	Palmerston 81's	Palmerston

March 4	Palmerston 81's	6 – 3	Listowel Jets	Listowel

March 5	Listowel Jets	6 – 4	Palmerston 81's	Palmerston

March 8	Palmerston 81's	4 – 5	OT	Listowel Jets	Listowel

March 11	Listowel Jets	3 – 4	Palmerston 81's	Palmerston

March 12	Palmerston 81's	2 – 7	Listowel Jets	Listowel

March 13	Listowel Jets	3 – 8	Palmerston 81's	Palmerston

Palmerston wins series 4 – 3

===== (10) Milverton Four Wheel Drives vs. (15) Mildmay Monarchs =====
February 25	Mildmay Monarchs	2 – 4	Milverton Four Wheel Drives	Milverton

March 3	Milverton Four Wheel Drives	4 – 2	Mildmay Monarchs	Mildmay

March 4	Mildmay Monarchs	2 – 5	Milverton Four Wheel Drives	Milverton

March 10	Milverton Four Wheel Drives	3 – 0	Mildmay Monarchs	Mildmay

Milverton wins series 4 – 0

===== (11) Monkton Wildcats vs. (14) Ripley Wolves =====
February 24	Ripley Wolves	2 – 3	OT	Monkton Wildcats	Monkton

February 25	Monkton Wildcats	3 – 8	Ripley Wolves	Ripley

March 3	Ripley Wolves	5 – 6	OT	Monkton Wildcats	Monkton

March 4	Monkton Wildcats	3 – 4	Ripley Wolves	Ripley

March 10	Ripley Wolves	1 – 6	Monkton Wildcats	Monkton

March 11	Monkton Wildcats	4 – 2	Ripley Wolves	Ripley

Monkton wins series 4 – 2

===== (12) Goderich Pirates vs. (13) Georgian Bay River Rats =====
February 24	Georgian Bay River Rats	6 – 5	OT	Goderich Pirates	Goderich

February 25	Goderich Pirates	6 – 3	Georgian Bay River Rats	Thornbury

March 3	Georgian Bay River Rats	1 – 9	Goderich Pirates	Goderich

March 4	Goderich Pirates	5 – 6	Georgian Bay River Rats	Thornbury

March 10	Georgian Bay River Rats	3 – 7	Goderich Pirates	Goderich

March 11	Goderich Pirates	3 – 10	Georgian Bay River Rats	Thornbury

March 12	Georgian Bay River Rats	3 – 4	Goderich Pirates	Goderich

Goderich wins series 4 – 3

==== WOAA Senior A semi-finals ====
===== (9) Palmerston 81's vs. (12) Goderich Pirates =====
March 18	Goderich Pirates	3 – 8	Palmerston 81's	Palmerston

March 24	Palmerston 81's	6 – 3	Goderich Pirates	Goderich

March 25	Goderich Pirates	4 – 5	OT	Palmerston 81's	Palmerston

March 31	Palmerston 81's	4 – 3	Goderich Pirates	Goderich

Palmerston wins series 4 – 0

===== (10) Milverton Four Wheel Drives vs. (11) Monkton Wildcats =====
March 18	Monkton Wildcats	3 – 6	Milverton Four Wheel Drives	Milverton

March 24	Milverton Four Wheel Drives	4 – 5	OT	Monkton Wildcats	Monkton

March 25	Monkton Wildcats	1 – 5	Milverton Four Wheel Drives	Milverton

March 31	Milverton Four Wheel Drives	4 – 5	Monkton Wildcats	Monkton

April 1	Monkton Wildcats	3 – 1	Milverton Four Wheel Drives	Milverton

April 2	Milverton Four Wheel Drives	1 – 3	Monkton Wildcats	Monkton

Monkton wins series 4 – 2

==== WOAA Sr. A Championship ====
===== (9) Palmerston 81's vs. (11) Monkton Wildcats =====
April 7	Monkton Wildcats	1 – 7	Palmerston 81's	Palmerston

April 8	Palmerston 81's	5 – 3	Monkton Wildcats	Monkton

April 14	Monkton Wildcats	2 – 4	Palmerston 81's	Palmerston

April 15	Palmerston 81's	7 – 2	Monkton Wildcats	Monkton

Palmerston wins series 4 – 0
