= 2003–04 WOAA Senior League season =

- League: WOAA Senior AA Hockey League
- Sport: Hockey
- Duration: Regular season October 2003 – January 2004; Playoffs; January 2004 – April 2004
- Teams: 17
- Finals champions: Sr. "AA" Champions - Durham Thundercats; Sr. "A" Champions - Georgian Bay River Rats

WOAA Senior League seasons
- 2002–03 2004–05

The 2003–04 WOAA Senior League season was the 14th season of the WOAA Senior AA Hockey League. The league played a regular season schedule which began in October 2003 and concluded in January 2004. The post-season began in January 2004 and concluded in April 2004.

The Durham Thundercats won the Sr. "AA" championship, defeating the Clinton Radars in five games. The Georgian Bay River Rats won the Sr. "A" championship.

== Team changes ==
- The Mildmay Monarchs returned to the league after a year of absence.
- The Ripley Wolves returned to the league after a year of absence.

== Final standings ==
Note: GP = Games played; W = Wins; L= Losses; OTL = Overtime losses; GF = Goals for; GA = Goals against; Pts = Points; Green shade = Clinched "AA" playoff spot

Rank	WOAA standings	GP	W	L	T	OTL	Pts	GF	GA
1	Clinton Radars	24	22	2	0	0	44	148	74
2	Durham Thundercats	24	18	4	2	0	38	167	69
3	Lucknow Lancers	24	18	6	0	0	36	137	65
4	Elora Rocks	24	18	6	0	0	36	147	75
5	Milverton Four Wheel Drives	24	17	6	1	0	35	125	69
6	Hensall Sherwoods	24	15	7	2	0	32	125	102
7	Shelburne Muskies	24	14	9	1	0	29	107	85
8	Palmerston 81's	24	13	11	0	0	26	111	91
9	Monkton Wildcats	24	10	11	1	2	23	82	102
10	Wingham Spitfires	24	10	13	1	0	21	100	129
11	Georgian Bay River Rats	24	9	12	1	2	21	80	109
12	Listowel Jets	24	8	14	1	1	18	94	142
13	Tavistock Royals	24	8	15	1	0	17	135	144
14	Goderich Pirates	24	5	18	1	0	11	93	163
15	Mildmay Monarchs	24	5	19	0	0	10	68	158
16	Ripley Wolves	24	3	17	3	1	10	58	132
17	Brussels Crusaders	24	3	20	1	0	7	63	128

=== Scoring leaders ===
Note: GP = Games played; G = Goals; A = Assists; Pts = Points; PIM = Penalty minutes

Player	Team	GP	G	A	Pts	PIM
Tyler Heimpel	Tavistock Royals	23	31	29	60	44
Jeremy Franks	Durham Thundercats	24	27	26	53	26
Kyle Boulton	Lucknow Lancers	20	32	19	51	31
Mike Woodley	Tavistock Royals	22	14	35	49	14
Sean Burton	Goderich Pirates	24	26	20	46	0
Jason Walsh	Tavistock Royals	22	19	26	45	69
Rob LeBlanc	Durham Thundercats	20	22	22	44	42
Darrin MacDonald	Lucknow Lancers	24	14	30	44	18
Scott Henderson	Clinton Radars	21	25	18	43	6
Brett Turner	Elora Rocks	21	22	21	43	16

== Sr. "AA" playoffs ==
=== Sr. "AA" playoff bracket ===
Sr. "AA" qualifying
1	Clinton	3
16	Ripley	0
8	Palmerston	3
9	Monkton	0
3	Lucknow	3
14	Goderich	0
6	Hensall	3
11	Georgian Bay	0
2	Durham	3
15	Mildmay	0
7	Shelburne	3
10	Wingham	1
4	Elora	3
13	Tavistock	0
5	Milverton	3
12	Listowel	0

Sr. "AA" quarter-finals
1	Clinton	4
8	Palmerston	3
3	Lucknow	3
6	Hensall	4
2	Durham	4
7	Shelburne	1
4	Elora	4
5	Milverton	2

Sr. "AA" semi-finals
1	Clinton	4
6	Hensall	3
2	Durham	4
3	Elora	2

Sr. "AA" finals
1	Clinton	1
2	Durham	4

==== WOAA Sr. "AA" elimination round ====
===== (16) Ripley Wolves vs. (17) Brussels Crusaders =====
January 31	Ripley Wolves	4 – 3	2OT	Brussels Crusaders	Brussels

February 1	Brussels Crusaders	1 – 2	2OT	Ripley Wolves	Ripley

Ripley wins series 2 – 0

==== WOAA Sr. "AA" qualifying round ====
===== (1) Clinton Radars vs. (16) Ripley Wolves =====
February 6	Ripley Wolves	2 – 8	Clinton Radars	Clinton

February 7	Clinton Radars	5 – 0	Ripley Wolves	Ripley

February 13	Ripley Wolves	3 – 7	Clinton Radars	Clinton

Clinton wins series 3 – 0

===== (2) Durham Thundercats vs. (15) Mildmay Monarchs =====
February 1	Durham Thundercats	7 – 1	Mildmay Monarchs	Mildmay

February 4	Mildmay Monarchs	2 – 9	Durham Thundercats	Durham

February 6	Mildmay Monarchs	2 – 13	Durham Thundercats	Durham

Durham wins series 3 – 0

===== (3) Lucknow Lancers vs. (14) Goderich Pirates =====
February 1	Lucknow Lancers	9 – 4	Goderich Pirates	Goderich

February 6	Goderich Pirates	3 – 14	Lucknow Lancers	Lucknow

February 8	Goderich Pirates	1 – 8	Lucknow Lancers	Lucknow

Lucknow wins series 3 – 0

===== (4) Elora Rocks vs. (13) Tavistock Royals =====
January 30	Tavistock Royals	5 – 12	Elora Rocks	Elora

January 31	Elora Rocks	8 – 4	Tavistock Royals	Tavistock

February 6	Tavistock Royals	4 – 9	Elora Rocks	Elora

Elora wins series 3 – 0

===== (5) Milverton Four Wheel Drives vs. (12) Listowel Jets =====
January 31	Listowel Jets	3 – 6	Milverton Four Wheel Drives	Milveton

February 6	Milverton Four Wheel Drives	7 – 1	Listowel Jets	Tavistock

February 7	Listowel Jets	0 – 7	Milverton Four Wheel Drives	Milveton

Milverton wins series 3 – 0

===== (6) Hensall Sherwoods vs. (11) Georgian Bay River Rats =====
January 31	Georgian Bay River Rats	2 – 3	Hensall Sherwoods	Hensall

February 1	Hensall Sherwoods	3 – 2	Georgian Bay River Rats	Thornbury

February 7	Georgian Bay River Rats	2 – 9	Hensall Sherwoods	Hensall

Hensall wins series 3 – 0

===== (7) Shelburne Muskies vs. (10) Wingham Spitfires =====
January 31	Wingham Spitfires	5 – 2	Shelburne Muskies	Shelburne

February 6	Shelburne Muskies	6 – 5	OT	Wingham Spitfires	Wingham

February 7	Wingham Spitfires	1 – 5	Shelburne Muskies	Shelburne

February 8	Shelburne Muskies	6 – 3	Wingham Spitfires	Wingham

Shelburne wins series 3 – 1

===== (8) Palmerston 81's vs. (9) Monkton Wildcats =====
February 1	Monkton Wildcats	3 – 6	Palmerston 81's	Palmerston

February 4	Palmerston 81's	4 – 1	Monkton Wildcats	Monkton

February 7	Monkton Wildcats	1 – 3	Palmerston 81's	Palmerston

Palmerston wins series 3 – 0

==== WOAA Sr. "AA" quarter-finals ====
===== (1) Clinton Radars vs. (8) Palmerston 81's =====
Note: Game four played in Harriston, Ontario.

February 20	Palmerston 81's	2 – 6	Clinton Radars	Clinton

February 21	Clinton Radars	2 – 4	Palmerston 81's	Palmerston

February 27	Palmerston 81's	2 – 8	Clinton Radars	Clinton

February 28	Clinton Radars	4 – 1	Palmerston 81's	Palmerston

March 5	Palmerston 81's	3 – 2	OT	Clinton Radars	Clinton

March 7	Clinton Radars	4 – 6	Palmerston 81's	Palmerston

March 9	Palmerston 81's	1 – 2	Clinton Radars	Clinton

Clinton wins series 4 – 3

===== (2) Durham Thundercats vs. (7) Shelburne Muskies =====
February 20	Shelburne Muskies	3 – 4	OT	Durham Thundercats	Durham

February 22	Durham Thundercats	6 – 4	Shelburne Muskies	Shelburne

February 28	Shelburne Muskies	3 – 4	OT	Durham Thundercats	Durham

March 5	Durham Thundercats	4 – 6	Shelburne Muskies	Shelburne

March 6	Shelburne Muskies	2 – 3	Durham Thundercats	Durham

Durham wins series 4 – 1

===== (3) Lucknow Lancers vs. (6) Hensall Sherwoods =====
February 13	Hensall Sherwoods	5 – 2	Lucknow Lancers	Lucknow

February 14	Lucknow Lancers	6 – 5	OT	Hensall Sherwoods	Hensall

February 20	Hensall Sherwoods	1 – 2	2OT	Lucknow Lancers	Lucknow

February 21	Lucknow Lancers	2 – 4	Hensall Sherwoods	Hensall

February 27	Hensall Sherwoods	2 – 6	Lucknow Lancers	Lucknow

February 28	Lucknow Lancers	2 – 4	Hensall Sherwoods	Hensall

March 5	Hensall Sherwoods	3 – 2	Lucknow Lancers	Lucknow

Hensall wins series 4 – 3

===== (4) Elora Rocks vs. (5) Milverton Four Wheel Drives =====
February 13	Milverton Four Wheel Drives	2 – 3	Elora Rocks	Elora

February 14	Elora Rocks	5 – 6	Milverton Four Wheel Drives	Milverton

February 20	Milverton Four Wheel Drives	5 – 6	OT	Elora Rocks	Elora

February 21	Elora Rocks	1 – 2	Milverton Four Wheel Drives	Milverton

February 27	Milverton Four Wheel Drives	3 – 6	Elora Rocks	Elora

February 28	Elora Rocks	7 – 1	Milverton Four Wheel Drives	Milverton

Elora wins series 4 – 2

==== WOAA Sr. "AA" semi-finals ====
===== (1) Clinton Radars vs. (5) Hensall Sherwoods =====
March 12	Hensall Sherwoods	4 – 7	Clinton Radars	Clinton

March 13	Clinton Radars	4 – 8	Hensall Sherwoods	Hensall

March 19	Hensall Sherwoods	0 – 2	Clinton Radars	Clinton

March 20	Clinton Radars	1 – 4	Hensall Sherwoods	Hensall

March 26	Hensall Sherwoods	2 – 3	Clinton Radars	Clinton

March 27	Clinton Radars	3 – 4	OT	Hensall Sherwoods	Hensall

March 30	Hensall Sherwoods	2 – 5	Clinton Radars	Clinton

Clinton wins series 4 – 3

===== (2) Durham Thundercats vs. (3) Elora Rocks =====
March 13	Elora Rocks	5 – 8	Durham Thundercats	Durham

March 14	Durham Thundercats	2 – 6	Elora Rocks	Elora

March 19	Elora Rocks	2 – 9	Durham Thundercats	Durham

March 21	Durham Thundercats	3 – 6	Elora Rocks	Elora

March 26	Elora Rocks	3 – 5	Durham Thundercats	Durham

March 28	Durham Thundercats	5 – 4	OT	Elora Rocks	Elora

Durham wins series 4 – 2

==== WOAA Sr. "AA" finals ====
===== (1) Clinton Radars vs. (2) Durham Thundercats =====
April 2	Durham Thundercats	3 – 2	OT	Clinton Radars	Clinton

April 3	Clinton Radars	1 – 4	Durham Thundercats	Durham

April 9	Durham Thundercats	4 – 5	Clinton Radars	Clinton

April 11	Clinton Radars	3 – 5	Durham Thundercats	Durham

April 16	Durham Thundercats	4 – 2	Clinton Radars	Clinton

Durham wins series 4 – 1

== Sr. "A" playoffs ==
=== Sr. "A" playoff bracket ===
Sr. "A" quarter-finals
9	Monkton	4
16	Ripley	0
12	Listowel	3
13	Tavistock	4
10	Wingham	4
15	Mildmay	1
11	Georgian Bay	4
14	Goderich	2

Sr. "A" semi-finals
9	Monkton	4
13	Tavistock	1
10	Wingham	1
11	Georgian Bay	4

Sr. "A" finals
9	Monkton	1
11	Georgian Bay	4

==== WOAA Sr. "A" quarter-finals ====
===== (9) Monkton Wildcats vs. (16) Ripley Wolves =====
February 20	Ripley Wolves	3 – 4	OT	Monkton Wildcats	Monkton

February 21	Monkton Wildcats	8 – 3	Ripley Wolves	Ripley

February 27	Ripley Wolves	1 – 10	Monkton Wildcats	Monkton

February 28	Monkton Wildcats	8 – 1	Ripley Wolves	Ripley

Monkton wins series 4 – 0

===== (10) Wingham Spitfires vs. (15) Mildmay Monarchs =====
February 14	Mildmay Monarchs	1 – 4	Wingham Spitfires	Wingham

February 20	Wingham Spitfires	2 – 3	Mildmay Monarchs	Mildmay

February 21	Mildmay Monarchs	2 – 4	Wingham Spitfires	Wingham

February 27	Wingham Spitfires	6 – 4	Mildmay Monarchs	Mildmay

February 28	Mildmay Monarchs	1 – 2	Wingham Spitfires	Wingham

Wingham wins series 4 – 1

===== (11) Georgian Bay River Rats vs. (14) Goderich Pirates =====
Note: Game two awarded to Goderich due to illegal player.

February 14	Goderich Pirates	3 – 7	Georgian Bay River Rats	Thornbury

February 20	Georgian Bay River Rats	4 – 3	Goderich Pirates	Goderich

February 22	Goderich Pirates	0 – 5	Georgian Bay River Rats	Thornbury

February 27	Georgian Bay River Rats	3 – 6	Goderich Pirates	Goderich

February 29	Goderich Pirates	3 – 5	Georgian Bay River Rats	Thornbury

March 6	Georgian Bay River Rats	5 – 4	Goderich Pirates	Goderich

Georgian Bay wins series 4 – 2

===== (12) Listowel Jets vs. (13) Tavistock Royals =====
February 14	Tavistock Royals	7 – 4	Listowel Jets	Listowel

February 21	Listowel Jets	9 – 5	Tavistock Royals	Tavistock

February 22	Tavistock Royals	3 – 4	OT	Listowel Jets	Listowel

February 28	Listowel Jets	5 – 4	Tavistock Royals	Tavistock

February 29	Tavistock Royals	7 – 5	Listowel Jets	Listowel

March 6	Listowel Jets	3 – 4	OT	Tavistock Royals	Tavistock

March 7	Tavistock Royals	4 – 2	Listowel Jets	Listowel

Tavistock wins series 4 – 3

==== WOAA Sr. "A" semi-finals ====
===== (9) Monkton Wildcats vs. (13) Tavistock Royals =====
March 12	Tavistock Royals	1 – 3	Monkton Wildcats	Monkton

March 13	Monkton Wildcats	5 – 3	Tavistock Royals	Tavistock

March 19	Tavistock Royals	5 – 4	Monkton Wildcats	Monkton

March 20	Monkton Wildcats	6 – 5	Tavistock Royals	Tavistock

March 26	Tavistock Royals	2 – 3	OT	Monkton Wildcats	Monkton

Monkton wins series 4 – 1

===== (10) Wingham Spitfires vs. (11) Georgian Bay River Rats =====
March 13	Wingham Spitfires	4 – 7	Georgian Bay River Rats	Thornbury

March 14	Georgian Bay River Rats	0 – 3	Wingham Spitfires	Wingham

March 20	Georgian Bay River Rats	5 – 2	Wingham Spitfires	Wingham

March 21	Wingham Spitfires	2 – 7	Georgian Bay River Rats	Thornbury

March 26	Georgian Bay River Rats	4 – 2	Wingham Spitfires	Wingham

Georgian Bay wins series 4 – 1

==== WOAA Sr. "A" finals ====
===== (9) Monkton Wildcats vs. (11) Georgian Bay River Rats =====
April 2	Georgian Bay River Rats	5 – 3	Monkton Wildcats	Monkton

April 3	Monkton Wildcats	1 – 4	Georgian Bay River Rats	Thornbury

April 9	Georgian Bay River Rats	2 – 3	OT	Monkton Wildcats	Monkton

April 10	Monkton Wildcats	2 – 6	Georgian Bay River Rats	Thornbury

April 11	Georgian Bay River Rats	5 – 4	Monkton Wildcats	Monkton

Georgian Bay wins series 4 – 1
