= 2000–01 WOAA Senior League season =

- League: WOAA Senior AA Hockey League
- Sport: Hockey
- Duration: Regular season October 2000 – January 2001; Playoffs; February 2001 – April 2001
- Teams: 15
- Finals champions: Sr. "AA" Champions - Durham Thundercats; Sr. "A" Champions - Wingham Spitfires

WOAA Senior League seasons
- 1999–00 2001–02

The 2000–01 WOAA Senior League season was the 11th season of the WOAA Senior AA Hockey League. The league played a regular season schedule which began in October 2000 and concluded in January 2001. The post-season began in February 2001 and concluded in April 2001.

The Durham Thundercats won the Sr. "AA" championship, defeating the Hensall Sherwoods in seven games. The Wingham Spitfires won the Sr. "A" championship.

== Team changes ==
- The Georgian Bay River Rats joined the league as an expansion team in the North Division.

== Final standings ==
Note: GP = Games played; W = Wins; L= Losses; OTL = Overtime losses; GF = Goals for; GA = Goals against; Pts = Points; Green shade = Clinched "AA" playoff spot

Rank	North Division	GP	W	L	T	OTL	Pts	GF	GA
1	Durham Thundercats	24	21	2	1	0	43	173	69
2	Palmerston 81's	24	19	5	0	0	38	102	62
3	Shelburne Muskies	24	16	7	0	1	33	136	106
4	Elora Rocks	24	13	9	1	1	28	108	83
5	Wingham Spitfires	24	9	14	0	1	19	85	127
6	Georgian Bay River Rats	24	7	16	0	1	15	94	130
7	Lucknow Lancers	24	5	18	0	1	11	65	127
8	Wiarton Redmen	24	5	18	0	1	11	91	150

Rank	South Division	GP	W	L	T	OTL	Pts	GF	GA
1	Milverton Four Wheel Drives	24	19	3	2	0	40	141	61
2	Hensall Sherwoods	24	17	6	0	1	35	118	92
3	Wellesley Merchants	24	13	9	1	1	28	112	77
4	Clinton Radars	24	12	11	1	0	25	98	97
5	Goderich Pirates	24	8	14	1	1	18	95	148
6	Tavistock Royals	24	6	14	3	1	16	88	114
7	Monkton Wildcats	24	3	16	4	1	11	61	124

=== Scoring leaders ===
Note: GP = Games played; G = Goals; A = Assists; Pts = Points; PIM = Penalty minutes

Player	Team	GP	G	A	Pts	PIM
Jim Pincock	Shelburne Muskies	23	24	33	57	16
Rob LeBlanc	Durham Thundercats	19	29	26	55	40
John Cameron	Shelburne Muskies	22	21	27	48	31
Sean McCann	Hensall Sherwoods	23	21	26	47	17
Chris Kennedy	Hensall Sherwoods	24	18	29	47	112
Sean Burton	Goderich Pirates	24	17	29	46	12
Brad Priestap	Goderich Pirates	21	19	26	45	27
Jeremy Franks	Durham Thundercats	21	24	18	42	28
Greg Buder	Wellesley Merchants	22	20	18	38	19
Daryl Faust	Wiarton Redmen	24	16	22	38	2

== Sr. "AA" playoffs ==
=== Sr. "AA" playoff bracket ===
Sr. "AA" quarter-finals
N1	Durham	4
S4	Clinton	1
N2	Palmerston	2
S3	Wellesley	4
S1	Milverton	4
N4	Elora	2
S2	Hensall	4
N3	Shelburne	3

Sr. "AA" semi-finals
N1	Durham	4
S3	Wellesley	0
S1	Milverton	1
S2	Hensall	4

Sr. "AA" finals
N1	Durham	4
S2	Hensall	3

==== WOAA Sr. "AA" quarter-finals ====
===== (N1) Durham Thundercats vs. (N4) Clinton Radars =====
February 7	Clinton Radars	3 – 6	Durham Thundercats	Durham

February 9	Durham Thundercats	8 – 5	Clinton Radars	Clinton

February 11	Durham Thundercats	3 – 2	Clinton Radars	Clinton

February 16	Clinton Radars	6 – 3	Durham Thundercats	Durham

February 17	Clinton Radars	2 – 7	Durham Thundercats	Durham

Durham wins series 4 – 1

===== (N2) Palmerston 81's vs. (S3) Wellesley Merchants =====
February 3	Wellesley Merchants	4 – 5	OT	Palmerston 81's	Palmerston

February 4	Palmerston 81's	1 – 5	Wellesley Merchants	Wellesley

February 9	Wellesley Merchants	4 – 9	Palmerston 81's	Palmerston

February 14	Palmerston 81's	3 – 5	Wellesley Merchants	Wellesley

February 16	Wellesley Merchants	4 – 2	Palmerston 81's	Palmerston

February 18	Palmerston 81's	2 – 3	OT	Wellesley Merchants	Wellesley

Wellesley wins series 4 – 2

===== (S1) Milverton Four Wheel Drives vs. (N4) Elora Rocks =====
February 4	Elora Rocks	4 – 3	Milverton Four Wheel Drives	Milverton

February 9	Milverton Four Wheel Drives	3 – 2	Elora Rocks	Elora

February 10	Elora Rocks	1 – 3	Milverton Four Wheel Drives	Milverton

February 16	Milverton Four Wheel Drives	2 – 4	Elora Rocks	Elora

February 17	Elora Rocks	2 – 5	Milverton Four Wheel Drives	Milverton

February 18	Milverton Four Wheel Drives	6 – 2	Elora Rocks	Elora

Milverton wins series 4 – 2

===== (S2) Hensall Sherwoods vs. (N3) Shelburne Muskies =====
February 3	Shelburne Muskies	2 – 5	Hensall Sherwoods	Hensall

February 11	Hensall Sherwoods	4 – 8	Shelburne Muskies	Shelburne

February 16	Hensall Sherwoods	1 – 6	Shelburne Muskies	Shelburne

February 17	Shelburne Muskies	1 – 5	Hensall Sherwoods	Hensall

February 18	Shelburne Muskies	1 – 4	Hensall Sherwoods	Hensall

February 20	Hensall Sherwoods	4 – 5	OT	Shelburne Muskies	Shelburne

February 21	Shelburne Muskies	4 – 6	Hensall Sherwoods	Hensall

Hensall wins series 4 – 3

==== WOAA Sr. "AA" semi-finals ====
===== (N1) Durham Thundercats vs. (S3) Wellesley Merchants =====
February 23	Wellesley Merchants	3 – 9	Durham Thundercats	Durham

February 25	Durham Thundercats	8 – 2	Wellesley Merchants	Wellesley

March 2	Wellesley Merchants	5 – 6	OT	Durham Thundercats	Durham

March 3	Durham Thundercats	6 – 1	Wellesley Merchants	Wellesley

Durham wins series 4 – 0

===== (S1) Milverton Four Wheel Drives vs. (S2) Hensall Sherwoods =====
February 24	Hensall Sherwoods	3 – 1	Milverton Four Wheel Drives	Milverton

February 27	Milverton Four Wheel Drives	4 – 5	Hensall Sherwoods	Hensall

March 3	Hensall Sherwoods	2 – 5	Milverton Four Wheel Drives	Milverton

March 9	Milverton Four Wheel Drives	4 – 5	OT	Hensall Sherwoods	Hensall

March 10	Hensall Sherwoods	5 – 4	OT	Milverton Four Wheel Drives	Milverton

Hensall wins series 4 – 1

==== WOAA Sr. "AA" finals ====
===== (N1) Durham Thundercats vs. (S2) Hensall Sherwoods =====
March 17	Hensall Sherwoods	4 – 2	Durham Thundercats	Durham

March 23	Durham Thundercats	6 – 5	Hensall Sherwoods	Hensall

March 25	Durham Thundercats	4 – 8	Hensall Sherwoods	Hensall

March 30	Hensall Sherwoods	1 – 10	Durham Thundercats	Durham

March 31	Hensall Sherwoods	1 – 5	Durham Thundercats	Durham

April 6	Durham Thundercats	3 – 4	OT	Hensall Sherwoods	Hensall

April 7	Hensall Sherwoods	2 – 5	Durham Thundercats	Durham

Durham wins series 4 – 3

== Sr. "A" playoffs ==
=== Sr. "A" playoff bracket ===
Sr. "A" quarter-finals
N5	Wingham	4
N8	Wiarton	0
N6	Georgian Bay	4
N7	Lucknow	3
S5	Goderich
S6	Tavistock
S7	Monkton

Sr. "A" semi-finals
N5	Wingham	4
N6	Georgian Bay	1
S5	Goderich	4
S6	Tavistock	1

Sr. "A" finals
N5	Wingham	4
S5	Goderich	1

==== WOAA Sr. "A" divisional semi-finals ====
===== (N5) Wingham Spitfires vs. (N8) Wiarton Redmen =====
February 3	Wiarton Redmen	4 – 7	Wingham Spitfires	Wingham

February 4	Wingham Spitfires	8 – 4	Wiarton Redmen	Wiarton

February 9	Wiarton Redmen	3 – 7	Wingham Spitfires	Wingham

February 11	Wingham Spitfires	6 – 2	Wiarton Redmen	Wiarton

Wingham wins series 4 – 0

===== (N6) Georgian Bay River Rats vs. (N7) Lucknow Lancers =====
February 2	Lucknow Lancers	3 – 2	Georgian Bay River Rats	Thornbury

February 4	Georgian Bay River Rats	2 – 1	Lucknow Lancers	Lucknow

February 9	Georgian Bay River Rats	12 – 3	Lucknow Lancers	Lucknow

February 11	Lucknow Lancers	3 – 8	Georgian Bay River Rats	Thornbury

February 17	Lucknow Lancers	4 – 3	Georgian Bay River Rats	Thornbury

February 11	Georgian Bay River Rats	1 – 4	Lucknow Lancers	Lucknow

February 20	Lucknow Lancers	4 – 7	Georgian Bay River Rats	Thornbury

Georgian Bay wins series 4 – 3

===== South division round-robin =====
Rank	South Division	GP	W	L	Pts	GF	GA
1	Tavistock Royals	4	3	1	6	16	13
2	Goderich Pirates	4	2	2	4	20	15
3	Monkton Wildcats	4	1	3	2	8	16

==== WOAA Sr. "A" divisional finals ====
===== (N5) Wingham Spitfires vs. (N6) Georgian Bay River Rats =====
February 23	Georgian Bay River Rats	5 – 6	Wingham Spitfires	Wingham

February 24	Wingham Spitfires	4 – 5	Georgian Bay River Rats	Thornbury

March 2	Georgian Bay River Rats	4 – 9	Wingham Spitfires	Wingham

March 3	Wingham Spitfires	9 – 3	Georgian Bay River Rats	Thornbury

March 9	Georgian Bay River Rats	4 – 8	Wingham Spitfires	Wingham

Wingham wins series 4 – 1

===== (S5) Goderich Pirates vs. (S6) Tavistock Royals =====
February 23	Tavistock Royals	2 – 5	Goderich Pirates	Goderich

March 2	Tavistock Royals	4 – 5	Goderich Pirates	Goderich

March 3	Goderich Pirates	2 – 11	Tavistock Royals	Tavistock

March 7	Goderich Pirates	10 – 3	Tavistock Royals	Tavistock

March 9	Tavistock Royals	2 – 5	Goderich Pirates	Goderich

Goderich wins series 4 – 1

==== WOAA Sr. "A" finals ====
===== (N5) Wingham Spitfires vs. (S5) Goderich Pirates =====
March 16	Goderich Pirates	6 – 8	Wingham Spitfires	Wingham

March 18	Wingham Spitfires	4 – 2	Goderich Pirates	Goderich

March 23	Wingham Spitfires	5 – 4	Goderich Pirates	Goderich

March 25	Wingham Spitfires	4 – 2	Goderich Pirates	Goderich

March 30	Goderich Pirates	1 – 5	Wingham Spitfires	Wingham

Wingham wins series 4 – 1
