= 2001–02 WOAA Senior League season =

- League: WOAA Senior AA Hockey League
- Sport: Hockey
- Duration: Regular season October 2001 – January 2002; Playoffs; February 2002 – March 2002
- Teams: 14
- Finals champions: Sr. "AA" Champions - Milverton Four Wheel Drives; Sr. "A" Champions - Wingham Spitfires

WOAA Senior League seasons
- 2000–01 2002–03

The 2001–02 WOAA Senior League season was the 12th season of the WOAA Senior AA Hockey League. The league played a regular season schedule which began in October 2001 and concluded in January 2002. The post-season began in February 2002 and concluded in March 2002.

The Milverton Four Wheel Drives won the Sr. "AA" championship, defeating the Durham Thundercats in six games. The Wingham Spitfires won the Sr. "A" championship.

== Team changes ==
- The Wellesley Merchants folded.
- The Wiarton Redmen were renamed to the Wiarton Devils.
- The Elora Rocks moved from the North Division to the South Division.

== Final standings ==
Note: GP = Games played; W = Wins; L= Losses; OTL = Overtime losses; GF = Goals for; GA = Goals against; Pts = Points; Green shade = Clinched "AA" playoff spot

Rank	North Division	GP	W	L	T	OTL	Pts	GF	GA
1	Durham Thundercats	24	21	1	1	1	44	179	79
2	Palmerston 81's	24	18	4	2	0	38	113	88
3	Shelburne Muskies	24	11	8	2	3	27	113	97
4	Wiarton Devils	24	11	11	1	1	24	130	116
5	Wingham Spitfires	24	11	11	2	0	24	112	113
6	Georgian Bay River Rats	24	7	16	0	1	15	94	143
7	Lucknow Lancers	24	1	22	0	1	3	70	175

Rank	South Division	GP	W	L	T	OTL	Pts	GF	GA
1	Milverton Four Wheel Drives	24	20	2	2	0	42	164	64
2	Hensall Sherwoods	24	17	4	2	1	37	127	66
3	Clinton Radars	24	15	8	1	0	31	99	85
4	Elora Rocks	24	10	10	3	1	24	110	106
5	Goderich Pirates	24	9	15	0	0	18	93	132
6	Tavistock Royals	24	7	16	1	0	15	100	140
7	Monkton Wildcats	24	1	21	1	1	4	46	146

=== Scoring leaders ===
Note: GP = Games played; G = Goals; A = Assists; Pts = Points; PIM = Penalty minutes

Player	Team	GP	G	A	Pts	PIM
Chris Kennedy	Hensall Sherwoods	24	19	29	48	80
Jeremy Franks	Durham Thundercats	23	22	25	47	49
Jim Pincock	Shelburne Muskies	21	17	27	44	10
Rob LeBlanc	Durham Thundercats	17	21	22	43	48
Brad Cripps	Durham Thundercats	21	19	23	42	19
Mike Hodgert	Milverton Four Wheel Drives	22	21	20	41	49
Sean Burton	Goderich Pirates	24	17	24	41	2
Chris Downie	Hensall Sherwoods	19	15	26	41	42
Tim Good	Wingham Spitfires	21	21	18	39	49
Dave Ritchie	Shelburne Muskies	22	20	18	38	18

== Sr. "AA" playoffs ==
=== Sr. "AA" playoff bracket ===
Sr. "AA" quarter-finals
1	Durham	4
8	Wiarton	1
4	Hensall	3
5	Clinton	4
2	Milverton	4
7	Elora	0
3	Palmerston	4
6	Shelburne	0

Sr. "AA" semi-finals
1	Durham	4
5	Clinton	1
2	Milverton	4
3	Palmerston	0

Sr. "AA" finals
1	Durham	2
2	Milverton	4

==== WOAA Sr. "AA" quarter-finals ====
===== (1) Durham Thundercats vs. (8) Wiarton Devils =====
February 1	Wiarton Devils	3 – 5	Durham Thundercats	Durham

February 3	Durham Thundercats	9 – 4	Wiarton Devils	Wiarton

February 8	Wiarton Devils	5 – 7	Durham Thundercats	Durham

February 10	Durham Thundercats	4 – 6	Wiarton Devils	Wiarton

February 15	Wiarton Devils	5 – 6	Durham Thundercats	Durham

Durham wins series 4 – 1

===== (2) Milverton Four Wheel Drives vs. (7) Elora Rocks =====
February 1	Elora Rocks	4 – 0	Milverton Four Wheel Drives	Milverton

February 3	Elora Rocks	2 – 9	Milverton Four Wheel Drives	Milverton

February 9	Elora Rocks	3 – 7	Milverton Four Wheel Drives	Milverton

February 13	Milverton Four Wheel Drives	5 – 4	OT	Elora Rocks	Elora

Milverton wins series 4 – 0

===== (3) Palmerston 81's vs. (6) Shelburne Muskies =====
February 3	Shelburne Muskies	2 – 4	Palmerston 81's	Palmerston

February 8	Shelburne Muskies	5 – 9	Palmerston 81's	Palmerston

February 9	Palmerston 81's	7 – 2	Shelburne Muskies	Shelburne

February 15	Palmerston 81's	9 – 3	Shelburne Muskies	Shelburne

Palmerston wins series 4 – 0

===== (4) Hensall Sherwoods vs. (5) Clinton Radars =====
February 2	Clinton Radars	2 – 4	Hensall Sherwoods	Hensall

February 8	Hensall Sherwoods	3 – 5	Clinton Radars	Clinton

February 9	Clinton Radars	0 – 3	Hensall Sherwoods	Hensall

February 15	Clinton Radars	4 – 6	Hensall Sherwoods	Hensall

February 16	Clinton Radars	2 – 5	Hensall Sherwoods	Hensall

February 17	Hensall Sherwoods	2 – 3	OT	Clinton Radars	Clinton

February 19	Clinton Radars	6 – 5	OT	Hensall Sherwoods	Hensall

Clinton wins series 4 – 3

==== WOAA Sr. "AA" semi-finals ====
===== (1) Durham Thundercats vs. (5) Clinton Radars =====
February 22	Clinton Radars	1 – 12	Durham Thundercats	Durham

February 24	Durham Thundercats	4 – 3	OT	Clinton Radars	Clinton

March 1	Clinton Radars	5 – 7	Durham Thundercats	Durham

March 2	Durham Thundercats	4 – 5	OT	Clinton Radars	Clinton

March 9	Clinton Radars	3 – 4	2OT	Durham Thundercats	Durham

Durham wins series 4 – 1

===== (2) Milverton Four Wheel Drives vs. (3) Palmerston 81's =====
February 23	Palmerston 81's	2 – 7	Milverton Four Wheel Drives	Milverton

February 24	Milverton Four Wheel Drives	5 – 4	Palmerston 81's	Palmerston

March 2	Palmerston 81's	1 – 4	Milverton Four Wheel Drives	Milverton

March 3	Milverton Four Wheel Drives	8 – 3	Palmerston 81's	Palmerston

Milverton wins series 4 – 0

==== WOAA Sr. "AA" finals ====
===== (1) Durham Thundercats vs. (2) Milverton Four Wheel Drives =====
March 16	Milverton Four Wheel Drives	3 – 4	Durham Thundercats	Durham

March 17	Durham Thundercats	5 – 3	Milverton Four Wheel Drives	Milverton

March 22	Milverton Four Wheel Drives	3 – 1	Durham Thundercats	Durham

March 23	Durham Thundercats	3 – 4	OT	Milverton Four Wheel Drives	Milverton

March 28	Milverton Four Wheel Drives	3 – 2	OT	Durham Thundercats	Durham

March 29	Durham Thundercats	1 – 5	Milverton Four Wheel Drives	Milverton

Milverton wins series 4 – 2

== Sr. "A" playoffs ==
=== Sr. "A" playoff bracket ===
Division finals
N1	Wingham	4
N2	Lucknow	0
S1	Goderich	4
S2	Tavistock	2

Sr. "A" finals
N1	Wingham	4
S1	Goderich	1

==== WOAA Sr. "A" qualifying round ====
Rank	North Division	GP	W	L	Pts	GF	GA
1	Wingham Spitfires	3	3	0	6	12	2
2	Lucknow Lancers	4	2	2	4	14	15
3	Georgian Bay River Rats	3	0	3	0	10	19

Rank	South Division	GP	W	L	Pts	GF	GA
1	Tavistock Royals	4	3	1	6	24	16
2	Goderich Pirates	4	3	1	6	22	15
3	Monkton Wildcats	4	0	4	0	7	22

==== WOAA Sr. "A" divisional finals ====
===== (N1) Wingham Spitfires vs. (N2) Lucknow Lancers =====
February 22	Lucknow Lancers	2 – 7	Wingham Spitfires	Wingham

February 23	Wingham Spitfires	5 – 3	Lucknow Lancers	Lucknow

March 1	Lucknow Lancers	2 – 6	Wingham Spitfires	Wingham

March 2	Wingham Spitfires	6 – 2	Lucknow Lancers	Lucknow

Wingham wins series 4 – 0

===== (S1) Goderich Pirates vs. (S2) Tavistock Royals =====
February 22	Tavistock Royals	6 – 3	Goderich Pirates	Goderich

February 23	Goderich Pirates	7 – 3	Tavistock Royals	Tavistock

March 1	Tavistock Royals	3 – 6	Goderich Pirates	Goderich

March 2	Goderich Pirates	1 – 4	Tavistock Royals	Tavistock

March 8	Tavistock Royals	4 – 6	Goderich Pirates	Goderich

March 12	Goderich Pirates	5 – 4	Tavistock Royals	Tavistock

Goderich wins series 4 – 2

==== WOAA Sr. "A" finals ====
===== (N1) Wingham Spitfires vs. (S1) Goderich Pirates =====
March 16	Goderich Pirates	3 – 7	Wingham Spitfires	Wingham

March 22	Wingham Spitfires	3 – 4	Goderich Pirates	Goderich

March 23	Goderich Pirates	1 – 5	Wingham Spitfires	Wingham

March 29	Wingham Spitfires	5 – 4	Goderich Pirates	Goderich

March 30	Goderich Pirates	1 – 4	Wingham Spitfires	Wingham

Wingham wins series 4 – 1
