= 2007–08 WOAA Senior League season =

- League: WOAA Senior AA Hockey League
- Sport: Hockey
- Duration: Regular season October 2007 – January 2008; Playoffs; February 2008 – April 2008
- Teams: 19
- Finals champions: Sr. AA - Tavistock Royals; Sr. A - Palmerston 81's

WOAA Senior League seasons
- 2006–07 2008–09

The 2007–08 WOAA Senior League season was the 18th season of the WOAA Senior AA Hockey League. The league played a 26-game regular season which began in October 2007 and concluded in January 2008. The post-season began in February 2008 and concluded in April 2008.

The Tavistock Royals won the WOAA Senior AA Hockey Championship, defeating the Elora Rocks in the final round of the playoffs.

== Team changes ==
- The Hensall Sherwoods relocated to Exeter, Ontario and were renamed the Exeter Mohawks.
- The Lucknow Lancers move from the North Division to the South Division.
- The Mildmay Monarchs withdrew from the league due to a lack of players.
- The Saugeen Shores Winterhawks join the league as an expansion team.
- The Shallow Lake Crushers join the league as an expansion team.

== Regular season ==
=== Final standings ===
Note: GP = Games played; W = Wins; L= Losses; OTL = Overtime losses; GF = Goals for; GA = Goals against; Pts = Points; Green shade = Clinched "AA" playoff spot

Rank	North Division	GP	W	L	OTL	SL	Pts	GF	GA
1	Saugeen Shores Winterhawks	26	23	3	0	0	46	172	69
2	Elora Rocks	26	22	2	1	1	46	197	74
3	Ripley Wolves	26	20	5	0	1	41	149	80
4	Shelburne Muskies	26	18	7	1	0	37	175	106
5	Palmerston 81's	26	16	8	1	1	34	122	92
6	Durham Thundercats	26	12	13	1	0	25	133	129
7	Georgian Bay River Rats	26	4	22	0	0	8	84	224
8	Drayton Icemen	26	3	22	0	1	7	91	187
9	Shallow Lake Crushers	26	3	22	1	0	7	73	199

Rank	South Division	GP	W	L	OTL	SL	Pts	GF	GA
1	Tavistock Royals	26	23	2	1	0	47	160	72
2	Clinton Radars	26	19	6	0	1	39	123	85
3	Lucan-Ilderton Jets	26	17	7	1	1	36	122	80
4	Exeter Mohawks	26	17	9	0	0	34	115	88
5	Lucknow Lancers	26	14	12	0	0	28	119	120
6	Milverton Four Wheel Drives	26	13	13	0	0	26	128	123
7	Goderich Pirates	26	11	15	0	0	22	84	100
8	Monkton Wildcats	26	10	15	1	0	21	107	112
9	Wingham Bulls	26	2	23	1	0	5	77	155
10	Thedford Dirty Dogs	26	0	26	0	0	0	68	205

=== Scoring leaders ===
Note: GP = Games played; G = Goals; A = Assists; Pts = Points; PIM = Penalty minutes

Player	Team	GP	G	A	Pts	PIM
Travis Van Gaver	Ripley Wolves	25	33	36	69	8
Mike Brito	Elora Rocks	26	29	40	69	32
Jeremy Machin	Elora Rocks	25	28	41	69	12
Rod Bauman	Elora Rocks	23	25	43	68	42
Mark Stanley	Lucknow Lancers	25	36	18	54	23
Lucas Vick	Clinton Radars	26	19	33	52	12
Chris Greer	Shelburne Muskies	26	32	19	51	18
Darrin MacDonald	Ripley Wolves	26	19	31	50	26
Chris Pugliese	Elora Rocks	25	20	27	47	24
Nick Locking	Ripley Wolves	26	24	22	46	34

== Playoffs ==
=== WOAA Senior "AA" Hockey playoffs ===
Sr. AA quarter-finals
N1	Saugeen Shores	4
S4	Exeter	1
N2	Elora	4
S3	Lucan-Ilderton	0
S1	Tavistock	4
N4	Shelburne	1
S2	Clinton	4
N3	Ripley	1

Sr. AA semi-finals
N1	Saugeen Shores	2
N2	Elora	4
S1	Tavistock	4
S2	Clinton	0

Sr. AA finals
N2	Elora	1
S1	Tavistock	4

==== WOAA Senior AA quarter-finals ====
===== (N1) Saugeen Shores Winterhawks vs. (S4) Exeter Mohawks =====
February 8	Exeter Mohawks	3 – 4	Saugeen Shores Winterhawks	Saugeen Shores

February 12	Saugeen Shores Winterhawks	4 – 5	OT	Exeter Mohawks	Exeter

February 15	Exeter Mohawks	2 – 6	Saugeen Shores Winterhawks	Saugeen Shores

February 17	Saugeen Shores Winterhawks	5 – 3	Exeter Mohawks	Exeter

February 22	Exeter Mohawks	4 – 5	Saugeen Shores Winterhawks	Saugeen Shores

Saugeen Shores wins series 4 – 1

===== (S1) Tavistock Royals vs. (N4) Shelburne Muskies =====
February 9	Shelburne Muskies	6 – 5	Tavistock Royals	Tavistock

February 15	Tavistock Royals	6 – 1	Shelburne Muskies	Shelburne

February 16	Shelburne Muskies	2 – 4	Tavistock Royals	Tavistock

February 22	Tavistock Royals	7 – 6	OT	Shelburne Muskies	Shelburne

February 23	Shelburne Muskies	4 – 6	Tavistock Royals	Tavistock

Tavistock wins series 4 – 1

===== (N2) Elora Rocks vs. (S3) Lucan-Ilderton Jets =====
February 8	Lucan-Ilderton Jets	3 – 4	Elora Rocks	Elora

February 9	Elora Rocks	6 – 2	Lucan-Ilderton Jets	Lucan

February 15	Lucan-Ilderton Jets	0 – 5	Elora Rocks	Elora

February 16	Elora Rocks	6 – 4	Lucan-Ilderton Jets	Lucan

Elora wins series 4 – 0

===== (S2) Clinton Radars vs. (N3) Ripley Wolves =====
February 8	Ripley Wolves	3 – 5	Clinton Radars	Clinton

February 9	Clinton Radars	2 – 5	Ripley Wolves	Ripley

February 15	Ripley Wolves	4 – 7	Clinton Radars	Clinton

February 16	Clinton Radars	5 – 4	Ripley Wolves	Ripley

February 22	Ripley Wolves	3 – 7	Clinton Radars	Clinton

Clinton wins series 4 – 1

==== WOAA Senior AA semi-finals ====
===== (N1) Saugeen Shores Winterhawks vs. (N2) Elora Rocks =====
February 29	Elora Rocks	6 – 5	OT	Saugeen Shores Winterhawks	Saugeen Shores

March 2	Saugeen Shores Winterhawks	5 – 4	Elora Rocks	Elora

March 7	Elora Rocks	4 – 7	Saugeen Shores Winterhawks	Saugeen Shores

March 9	Saugeen Shores Winterhawks	2 – 5	Elora Rocks	Elora

March 14	Elora Rocks	6 – 5	Saugeen Shores Winterhawks	Saugeen Shores

March 15	Saugeen Shores Winterhawks	1 – 2	OT	Elora Rocks	Elora

Elora wins series 4 – 2

===== (S1) Tavistock Royals vs. (S2) Clinton Radars =====
March 1	Clinton Radars	5 – 8	Tavistock Royals	Tavistock

March 7	Tavistock Royals	8 – 1	Clinton Radars	Clinton

March 12	Clinton Radars	3 – 5	Tavistock Royals	Tavistock

March 14	Tavistock Royals	5 – 4	OT	Clinton Radars	Clinton

Tavistock wins series 4 – 0

==== WOAA Sr. AA Championship ====
===== (S1) Tavistock Royals vs. (N2) Elora Rocks =====
March 22	Elora Rocks	5 – 2	Tavistock Royals	Tavistock

March 23	Tavistock Royals	5 – 4	Elora Rocks	Elora

March 29	Elora Rocks	4 – 5	Tavistock Royals	Tavistock

April 4	Tavistock Royals	4 – 3	Elora Rocks	Elora

April 5	Elora Rocks	1 – 6	Tavistock Royals	Tavistock

Tavistock wins series 4 – 1

=== WOAA Senior "A" Hockey playoffs ===
Sr. A qualifying
N5	Palmerston	bye
S8	Monkton	2
S9	Wingham	0
N6	Durham	bye
S7	Goderich	2
S10	Thedford	1
S5	Lucknow	bye
N8	Drayton	2
N9	Shallow Lake	1
S6	Milverton	bye
N7	Georgian Bay	bye

Sr. A quarter-finals
N5	Palmerston	4
S8	Monkton	3
N6	Durham	4
S7	Goderich	2
S5	Lucknow	4
N8	Drayton	1
S6	Milverton	4
N7	Georgian Bay	0

Sr. A semi-finals
N5	Palmerston	4
N6	Durham	1
S5	Lucknow	4
S6	Milverton	3

Sr. A finals
N5	Palmerston	4
S5	Lucknow	2

==== WOAA Senior A qualifying round ====
===== (N8) Drayton Icemen vs. (N9) Shallow Lake Crushers =====
February 1	Shallow Lake Crushers	4 – 5	Drayton Icemen	Drayton

February 2	Drayton Icemen	2 – 4	Shallow Lake Crushers	Shallow Lake

February 3	Shallow Lake Crushers	4 – 5	OT	Drayton Icemen	Drayton

Drayton wins series 2 – 1

===== (S7) Goderich Pirates vs. (S10) Thedford Dirty Dogs =====
February 1	Thedford Dirty Dogs	4 – 2	Goderich Pirates	Goderich

February 2	Goderich Pirates	4 – 1	Thedford Dirty Dogs	Thedford

February 3	Thedford Dirty Dogs	1 – 7	Goderich Pirates	Goderich

Goderich wins series 2 – 1

===== (S8) Monkton Wildcats vs. (S9) Wingham Bulls =====
February 1	Wingham Bulls	5 – 10	Monkton Wildcats	Monkton

February 2	Monkton Wildcats	7 – 6	Wingham Bulls	Wingham

Monkton wins series 2 – 0

==== WOAA Senior A quarter-finals ====
===== (N5) Palmerston 81's vs. (S8) Monkton Wildcats =====
February 8	Monkton Wildcats	4 – 3	OT	Palmerston 81's	Palmerston

February 15	Palmerston 81's	1 – 2	Monkton Wildcats	Monkton

February 17	Monkton Wildcats	3 – 5	Palmerston 81's	Palmerston

February 18	Palmerston 81's	2 – 1	Monkton Wildcats	Monkton

February 22	Monkton Wildcats	4 – 0	Palmerston 81's	Palmerston

February 23	Palmerston 81's	4 – 3	Monkton Wildcats	Monkton

February 24	Monkton Wildcats	4 – 5	Palmerston 81's	Palmerston

Palmerston wins series 4 – 3

===== (S5) Lucknow Lancers vs. (N8) Drayton Icemen =====
February 8	Drayton Icemen	2 – 1	Lucknow Lancers	Lucknow

February 15	Drayton Icemen	2 – 3	Lucknow Lancers	Lucknow

February 16	Lucknow Lancers	7 – 5	Drayton Icemen	Drayton

February 17	Lucknow Lancers	8 – 3	Drayton Icemen	Drayton

February 22	Drayton Icemen	0 – 10	Lucknow Lancers	Lucknow

Lucknow wins series 4 – 1

===== (N6) Durham Thundercats vs. (S7) Goderich Pirates =====
February 8	Goderich Pirates	4 – 7	Durham Thundercats	Durham

February 15	Durham Thundercats	3 – 6	Goderich Pirates	Goderich

February 17	Durham Thundercats	6 – 5	Goderich Pirates	Goderich

February 22	Goderich Pirates	4 – 6	Durham Thundercats	Durham

February 23	Goderich Pirates	5 – 3	Durham Thundercats	Durham

February 24	Durham Thundercats	6 – 4	Goderich Pirates	Goderich

Durham wins series 4 – 2

===== (S6) Milverton Four Wheel Drives vs. (N7) Georgian Bay River Rats =====
February 9	Georgian Bay River Rats	2 – 13	Milverton Four Wheel Drives	Milverton

February 16	Georgian Bay River Rats	3 – 9	Milverton Four Wheel Drives	Milverton

February 19	Milverton Four Wheel Drives	10 – 4	Georgian Bay River Rats	Thornbury

February 22	Milverton Four Wheel Drives	10 – 4	Georgian Bay River Rats	Thornbury

Milverton wins series 4 – 0

==== WOAA Senior A semi-finals ====
===== (N5) Palmerston 81's vs. (N6) Durham Thundercats =====
March 2	Durham Thundercats	7 – 9	Palmerston 81's	Palmerston

March 7	Palmerston 81's	3 – 4	Durham Thundercats	Durham

March 12	Durham Thundercats	5 – 10	Palmerston 81's	Palmerston

March 14	Palmerston 81's	7 – 3	Durham Thundercats	Durham

March 15	Durham Thundercats	4 – 7	Palmerston 81's	Palmerston

Palmerston wins series 4 – 1

===== (S5) Lucknow Lancers vs. (S6) Milverton Four Wheel Drives =====
February 29	Milverton Four Wheel Drives	3 – 2	Lucknow Lancers	Lucknow

March 1	Lucknow Lancers	2 – 0	Milverton Four Wheel Drives	Milverton

March 7	Milverton Four Wheel Drives	5 – 4	Lucknow Lancers	Lucknow

March 9	Lucknow Lancers	5 – 2	Milverton Four Wheel Drives	Milverton

March 14	Milverton Four Wheel Drives	5 – 6	OT	Lucknow Lancers	Lucknow

March 15	Lucknow Lancers	6 – 9	Milverton Four Wheel Drives	Milverton

March 16	Milverton Four Wheel Drives	4 – 5	Lucknow Lancers	Lucknow

Lucknow wins series 4 – 3

==== WOAA Sr. A Championship ====
===== (N5) Palmerston 81's vs. (S5) Lucknow Lancers =====
March 22	Lucknow Lancers	5 – 4	Palmerston 81's	Palmerston

March 28	Palmerston 81's	6 – 4	Lucknow Lancers	Lucknow

March 30	Lucknow Lancers	1 – 7	Palmerston 81's	Palmerston

April 4	Palmerston 81's	5 – 7	Lucknow Lancers	Lucknow

April 5	Lucknow Lancers	3 – 7	Palmerston 81's	Palmerston

April 6	Palmerston 81's	3 – 2	Lucknow Lancers	Lucknow

Palmerston wins series 4 – 2
