= Nottawasaga River Rats =

- City: Borden, Ontario
- League: WOAA Senior Hockey League
- Division: North
- Home arena: Andy Anderson Arena
- Colours: Red, Black, Grey

Franchise history
- 19xx-2008: Georgian Bay River Rats
- 2008-2009: Nottawasaga River Rats

The Nottawasaga River Rats were a senior hockey team based out of CFB Borden. They played in the Western Ontario Athletic Association Senior Hockey League.

== Championships ==
Nottawasaga won one WOAA Championship, when they were known as Georgian Bay and won the Senior "A" championship in 2004.

== 2006–07 River Rats season ==
This season proved to be disastrous for the River Rats, as they finished the regular season with a 0-24-0 record, last place in the 18 team WOAA. Georgian Bay had a victory in mid-December, a 4-3 win over the Durham Thundercats, however they were stripped of the win due to playing with illegal players.

The River Rats' struggles continued into their best of three qualifying series with the Drayton Icemen, as they were swept in two games by the Icemen, ending the River Rats season.

== 2007–08 River Rats season ==
Georgian Bay River Rats Logo

After dropping their first game of the season, the River Rats earned their first victory in nearly two years when Georgian Bay defeated the expansion team Shallow Lake Crushers 7-5, ending their long losing streak. Wins were few and far between for the River Rats all season long, as they finished with a 4-22-0 record, however, they finished in seventh place, and earned a spot in the "A" playoffs.

The River Rats opponent in the quarter-finals was the Milverton Four Wheel Drives, and Georgian Bay quickly found themselves down two games to none after Milverton won both the games on their home ice by scores of 13-2 and 9-3. The series moved to Georgian Bay for the next two games, but Milverton continued to win by blowout scores, winning both games three and four by a 10-4 score, eliminating the River Rats from the playoffs.

In June 2008, the Georgian Bay River Rats announced that they were moving from Thornbury, Ontario to CFB Borden and were renamed the Nottawasaga River Rats.

== 2008–09 River Rats season ==
In the River Rats first season in Nottawasaga, the club continued to struggle, earning only one victory, defeating the Shallow Lake Crushers 6-5 in their fourteenth game of the year. Nottawasaga finished the year with a 1-19-0 record, earning two points, and eleventh place in the WOAA North Division, failing to qualify for the post-season. After the season, the club announced they were ceasing operations, and withdrew from the league.

== Season-by-season record ==
Note: GP = Games played, W = Wins, L = Losses, T= Tie, OTL = Overtime Losses, Pts = Points, GF = Goals for, GA = Goals against

Season	GP	W	L	T	OTL	GF	GA	PTS	Finish	Playoffs
2000–01	24	7	16	0	1	94	130	15	6th in North	Won in Sr. "A" quarter-finals (4-3 vs. Lancers); Lost in Sr. "A" semi-finals (1-4 vs. Spitfires)
2001–02	24	7	16	0	1	94	143	15	6th in North	Lost in "A" round-robin (3rd place)
2002–03	24	7	15	2	0	103	168	16	12th in WOAA	Won in "A" round-robin (2nd place); Won in "A" semi-finals (4-2 vs. Rocks); Lost in "A" finals (0-4 vs. Spitfires)
2003–04	24	9	12	1	2	80	109	21	11th in WOAA	Lost in "AA" qualifying round (0-3 vs. Lancers); Won in "A" quarter-finals (4-2 vs. Pirates); Won in "A" semi-finals (4-1 vs. Spitfires); Won in "A" finals (4-1 vs. Wildcats)
2004–05	25	6	17	1	1	76	133	14	14th in WOAA	Lost in "AA" qualifying round (0-3 vs. Muskies); Lost in "A" quarter-finals (1-4 vs. Jets)
2005–06	25	7	16	-	2	96	146	16	13th in WOAA	Lost in "AA" qualifying round (0-3 vs. Lancers); Lost in "A" quarter-finals (3-4 vs. Pirates)
2006–07	24	0	24	-	0	49	180	0	9th in North	Lost in preliminary round (0-2 vs. Icemen)
2007–08	26	4	22	-	0	84	224	8	7th in North	Lost in "A" quarter-finals (0-4 vs. Drives)
2008–09	20	1	19	-	0	54	170	2	11th in North	Did not qualify

More information will be added as more becomes available

== Related links ==
- CFB Borden
- Western Ontario Athletic Association
- WOAA Senior Hockey League
