= Mabel Broughton Billett =

Canadian writer (1892–1964)

- Born: December 22, 1892; Hensall
- Died: March 3, 1964 (aged 71); San Francisco
- Occupation: Writer

Mabel Broughton Billett (December 22, 1892 – March 3, 1964) was a Canadian writer of detective novels.

Mabel Broughton Billett was born on December 22, 1892 in Hensall, Ontario, the daughter of William Bell McLean, a machine agent, and Elizabeth Ross McLean. In the 1920s, she married Frederick Broughton Billett, an Imperial Oil transfer agent, and they moved to Merritt, British Columbia. British Columbia would be the setting for most of her work.

Her novel Calamity House (1927) was inspired by rumors around the death of the wife of a Nicola Valley doctor. Her novel The Shadow of the Steppe (1930) concerns intrigue in Afghanistan. In her The Robot Detective (1932), the human detective feeds punchcards into a computer to help solve a double murder in a fictional remote British Columbia town. Her novel The Smooth Silence (1936) was a fictionalized version of the Janet Smith case. To be published by Ryerson Press, the book was rumored to be quashed by parties unknown. It was serialized by National Home Monthly.

Mabel Broughton Billett died on March 3, 1964 in San Francisco.

== Bibliography ==
- Calamity House (1927)
- The Shadow of the Steppe (1930)
- The Robot Detective (1932)
