= Goderich Pirates =

- City: Goderich, Ontario
- League: WOAA Senior Hockey League
- Division: South
- Operated: 1995-2014
- Home arena: Maitland Recreation Centre
- Colours: Red, White and Black

The Goderich Pirates were a senior hockey team based out of Goderich, Ontario, Canada. They played in the Western Ontario Athletic Association Senior Hockey League.

After the 2013–14 season, the club relocated to Seaforth, Ontario and were renamed the Huron East Centenaires.

== Championships ==
Goderich has won two WOAA Championship, back in the 1953-54 season and the 1997-98 season.

== 2006–07 Pirates season ==
Goderich, coming off an 8-17-0 season in 2005-06, improved a little bit, going 9-13-2, good for seventh in the WOAA South Division.

The Pirates were swept by the Ripley Wolves in the Sr. "A" quarter-finals, although the scores of the game were close, including a controversial goal scored by Ripley in overtime in the 3rd game of the series. After the goal, Pirates general manager Trevor Bazinet stormed onto the ice, had an argument with the referee, and ended up hitting him. South Bruce OPP were called to the game but the hockey official declined to press charges.

== 2007–08 Pirates season ==
Goderich would once again improve from their previous season, as they finished the year with a record of 11-15-0, earning 22 points. It was the Pirates highest win total and point total since the 1998-99 season.

The team would face the Thedford Dirty Dogs, in a best of three qualifying round, with the winner advancing to the WOAA "A" playoffs. The Dirty Dogs, who went pointless during the season, stunned the Pirates in the series opener in Goderich with a 4-2 win. The Pirates fought back in the second game in Thedford with a 4-1 victory, setting up a third and deciding game back in Goderich. The Pirates would close out the series with a 7-1 rout, advancing to the "A" playoffs.

Goderich would face the defending "A" champions, the Durham Thundercats, in the "A" quarter-finals, and the Pirates lost the series opener 7-4, but followed it up with a solid 6-3 win in the second game to even the series up. Durham took control of the series, holding off the Pirates 6-5 in the third game, followed by a 6-4 victory in the fourth game, as they took a 3-1 series lead. Goderich played a very solid fifth game, winning 5-3 to cut the Thundercats series lead to 3-2, but Durham would close it out with 6-4 win in the sixth game, eliminating the Pirates from the post-season.

== 2008–09 Pirates season ==
Goderich would continue to improve in the 2008-09 season, as they finished with a record of 9-10-1, earning 19 points, and eighth place in the WOAA South Division standings.

The Pirates opened the playoffs against the Petrolia Squires in a best of seven series, with the winner moving on to the "AA" quarter-finals. The Squires opened the series with a win, holding off Goderich 4-3. The Pirates were able to send the second game in overtime, however, Petrolia once again came out on top, winning 4-3 to take a 2-0 series lead. In the third game, the Squires once again took the victory, winning 7-5, and poised to sweep the series. In the fourth game, Goderich kept the game close once again, however, found themselves on the wrong side of a 3-2 score, and were sent to the "A" playoffs.

Goderich would face the Lucan-Ilderton Jets, who finished second in the South Division during the season, however, they were upset by the Monkton Wildcats in the "AA" qualifying round. The Pirates kept the game close in the series opener, however, they lost in overtime as Lucan won the game 4-3. The Jets took the second game of the series, defeating Goderich 5-2, followed by another overtime victory in the third game, as they beat the Pirates 5-4. Goderich, fighting off elimination, won a very high scoring fourth game, as the Pirates defeated the Jets 11-8. Lucan would rebound in the fifth game, easily defeating Goderich 9-4, and ending the Pirates season.

== 2009–10 Pirates season ==
The Pirates would have a disappointing 2009-10 season, as the club finished with a 6-14-0 record, finishing in last place in the WOAA South Division standings, and failing to qualify for the "AA" playoffs. Offense was a problem for Goderich, as they scored a league low 67 goals.

Goderich is currently facing the Walkerton Capitals and Drayton Icemen in a "B" round robin series.

== Season-by-season record ==
Note: GP = Games played, W = Wins, L = Losses, T= Tie, OTL = Overtime Losses, Pts = Points, GF = Goals for, GA = Goals against

Season	GP	W	L	T	OTL	GF	GA	PTS	Finish	Playoffs
1995-96	24	5	19	0	-	97	226	10	8th WOAA Sr A	Lost Sr. A Quarter-Final (1-4 vs. Wolves)
1996-97	24	15	9	0	-	129	115	30	3rd WOAA Sr A	Won Sr. A Quarter-Final (4-3 vs. Tigers); Won Sr. A Semi-Final (4-3 vs. Redmen); Won Sr. A Final (4-3 vs. Wolves)
1997-98	24	10	12	1	1	111	130	22	3rd WOAA Sr A West	Won Sr. A Preliminary Round (2-1 vs. Wolves); Lost Sr. A Quarter-Final (3-4 vs. Radar)
1998-99	24	15	8	1	0	136	110	31	1st WOAA Sr A West	Won Sr. A Quarter-Final (4-0 vs. Sherwoods); Lost Sr. A Semi-Final (2-4 vs. Radar)
1999-00	24	8	14	1	1	134	175	18	5th WOAA South	1st in Sr. A Round Robin (3-1 vs. Wildcats and Royals); Lost Sr. A Semi-Final (2-4 vs. Wildcats)
2000-01	25	8	14	1	1	95	148	18	5th WOAA South	2nd in Sr. A Round Robin (2-2 vs. Wildcats and Royals); Won Sr. A Semi-Final (4-1 vs. Royals); Lost Sr A Final (1-4 vs. Spitfires)
2001-02	24	9	15	0	0	95	132	18	5th WOAA South	1st in Sr. A Round Robin (3-1 vs. Wildcats and Royals); Won Sr. A Semi-Final (4-2 vs. Royals); Lost Sr A Final (1-4 vs. Spitfires)
2002-03	24	4	19	1	0	74	192	9	13th WOAA Sr	3rd in Sr. A Round Robin (0-4 vs. River Rats and Spitfires)
2003-04	24	5	18	1	0	93	163	11	14th WOAA Sr	Lost Sr. AA Qualifying Round (0-3 vs. Lancers); Lost Sr. A Quarter-Final (2-4 vs. River Rats)
2004-05	25	4	17	4	0	94	186	12	17th WOAA Sr	Won Elimination Round (2-0 vs. Wolves; Lost Sr. AA Qualifying Round (0-3 vs. Rocks); Lost Sr. A Quarter-Final (1-4 vs. Jets)
2005-06	25	8	17	-	0	105	145	16	12th WOAA Sr	Lost Sr. AA Qualifying Round (0-3 vs. Lancers); Won Sr. A Quarter-Final (4-3 vs. River Rats); Lost Sr. A Semi-Final (0-4 vs. 81's)
2006-07	24	9	13	-	2	120	150	20	7th WOAA South	Lost Sr. A Quarter-Final (0-4 vs. Wolves)
2007-08	26	11	15	-	0	84	100	22	7th WOAA South	Won Elimination Round (2-1 vs. Dirty Dogs); Lost Sr. A Quarter-Final (2-4 vs. Thundercats)
2008-09	20	9	10	-	1	90	103	19	8th WOAA South	Lost Sr. AA Qualifying Round (0-4 vs. Squires); Lost Sr. A Quarter-Final (1-4 vs. Jets)
2009-10	20	6	14	-	0	67	111	12	9th WOAA South	Won Sr. B Semi-Final Round Robin (4-0 vs. Icemen and Capitals); Won Sr. B Final (4-1 vs. Icemen)
2010-11	26	7	19	-	0	108	168	14	8th WOAA South	Lost Sr. AA Divisional Quarter-Final (0-4 vs. Royals)
2011-12	24	5	16	-	3	94	161	13	8th WOAA South	Lost Sr. AA Divisional Quarter-Final (0-4 vs. Royals)
2012-13	24	0	24	-	0	44	211	0	9th WOAA South	Did not qualify
2013-14	24	1	23	-	0	56	208	2	8th WOAA South	Lost Sr. AA Divisional Quarter-Final (0-4 vs. Thunder)

More information will be added as more becomes available

== Related links ==
- Goderich, Ontario
- Western Ontario Athletic Association
- WOAA Senior Hockey League
