= Monkton, Ontario =

Monkton
- Town
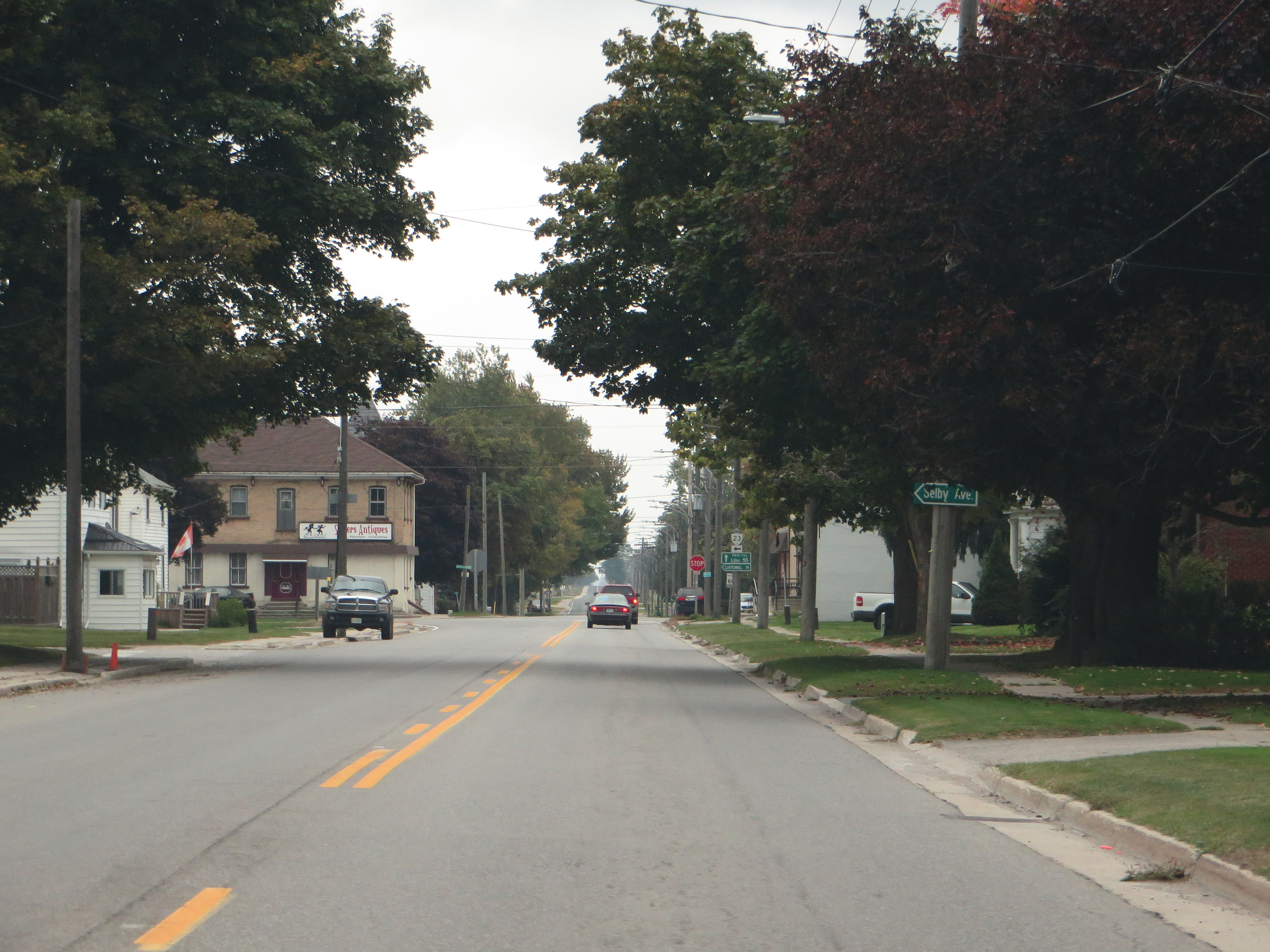
- Monkton, Ontario
- Interactive map of Monkton
- Coordinates: 43°35′14″N 81°04′54″W
- Country: Canada
- Province: Ontario
- County: Perth
- Township: North Perth

Government
  - Type: Municipality of North Perth
- Elevation: 365 m (1,198 ft)
- Time zone: UTC-5 (EST)
  - Summer (DST): UTC-4 (EDT)
- Postal code: N0K 1P0
- Area code: 519

Monkton is a village in Perth County, Ontario, Canada, located at the intersection of County Roads 55 and 23. The community is west of Milverton and southwest of Listowel.

It is part of the Municipality of North Perth.

The village is home to the Monkton Wildcats, a Senior Hockey Club of the Western Ontario Athletic Association.

The village is situated partly in Logan but largely in Elma.

== History ==
Monkton originated with the construction of the Logan gravel road. In 1857 Mr. T. M. Daly, a contractor on the highway, erected the first building in the new settlement, a blacksmith shop located on 47 Maddison st east. Once the gravel road was completed, a stage route was opened from Mitchell to Newry to carry passengers and provide a mail service between the two communities.

Two hotels were built to accommodate travelers, one in Logan, the other in Elma, and a third hotel was built in 1883.

In the same period, Mr. Winstanley obtained a grant of 1,000 acres to aid in the establishment of a sawmill. About 1878 William Machan purchased Edward Winstanley's sawmill in Monkton. Mr. Machan had previously operated a sawmill at Carmunnock. He operated "West Monckton Mills" which was advertised as a "manufacturer and dealer in all kinds of lumber, lath, shingles, and cedar posts." Schade Street was named for the Schade family who owned the farm on which the street was built. James McKenzie opened a post office.

Early settler families included the Machan, Schade, Dobbs, Stewarts, Holmans, Golightlys, Larkins, McKenzies, Merryfields and Reices.

A school was built after the number of families in the village grew. In 1870, a second school was erected and replaced in 1888 by a new building, which served as the local school for many years.

At an early period, Monkton had a match factory, two saw mills, planing mill, shingle mill, tannery and several business houses.

== Religion ==
In the mid-nineteenth century, pioneer ministers established a Christian church in the village. The local mercantile store, which was operated by Mr. Dunsmore, served as the first church building.

Today there are three churches in Monkton, all within mainline, Protestant denominations: Redeemer Lutheran, Knox Presbyterian and Monkton United Church of Canada.

== Today ==
Monkton continues to be a thriving village that includes a postal service, community library, recreation centre, several churches and a number of other business establishments.

Monkton is home of the Monkton Wildcats, a club within the Senior AA Hockey League which is part of Western Ontario Athletic Association. Also, Monkton is home to the paralympic hockey player Corbyn Smith. He is known for earning a silver medal in para ice hockey at the 2018 Winter Paralympics.
