= Listowel Jets =

- City: Listowel, Ontario
- League: WOAA Senior Hockey League
- Operated: 2002-2006
- Home arena: Listowel Memorial Arena

The Listowel Jets were a senior hockey team based out of Listowel, Ontario, Canada. They played in the Western Ontario Athletic Association Senior Hockey League.

== History ==
The Jets played from 2002–2006, and in 97 games, they had a record of 22-70-2-5. Their best season was in 2004-05, when they had a record of 8-14-1-2, for 19 points, and finished in 11th place in the league. In the 2005-06 playoffs, after losing to the Durham Thundercats in 3 games in the "AA" playoffs, they would be relegated to the "A" playoffs, and nearly upset the heavily favoured Palmerston 81's, taking them to 7 games. The Jets folded in the summer of 2006, and the WOAA placed an expansion team in Thedford, Ontario to replace them.

== Season-by-season record ==
Note: GP = Games played, W = Wins, L = Losses, T= Tie, OTL = Overtime Losses, Pts = Points, GF = Goals for, GA = Goals against

Season	GP	W	L	T	OTL	GF	GA	PTS	Finish	Playoffs
2002-03	24	3	21	0	1	63	150	7	14th WOAA Sr	
2003-04	24	8	14	1	1	90	136	18	12th WOAA Sr	
2004-05	25	8	14	1	2	107	124	19	11th WOAA Sr	
2005-06	24	3	21	-	1	78	161	7	17th WOAA Sr	Lost "A" QF

More information will be added as more becomes available

== See also ==
- Listowel, Ontario
- Western Ontario Athletic Association
- WOAA Senior Hockey League
