= Hensall, Ontario =

Community in Ontario, Canada

Coordinates: 43°26′N 81°30′W

Hensall is a community in Bluewater, Ontario, Canada with a population of 1,173 (2011 Census). It is located in the centre of Huron County's agricultural land, and is home to three large processing facilities: Thompsons Limited, Hensall Co-op, and Cook's Division of Parrish & Heimbecker Ltd. (now owned by Hensall Co-op), where thousands of tons of beans are annually processed, packaged and shipped worldwide.

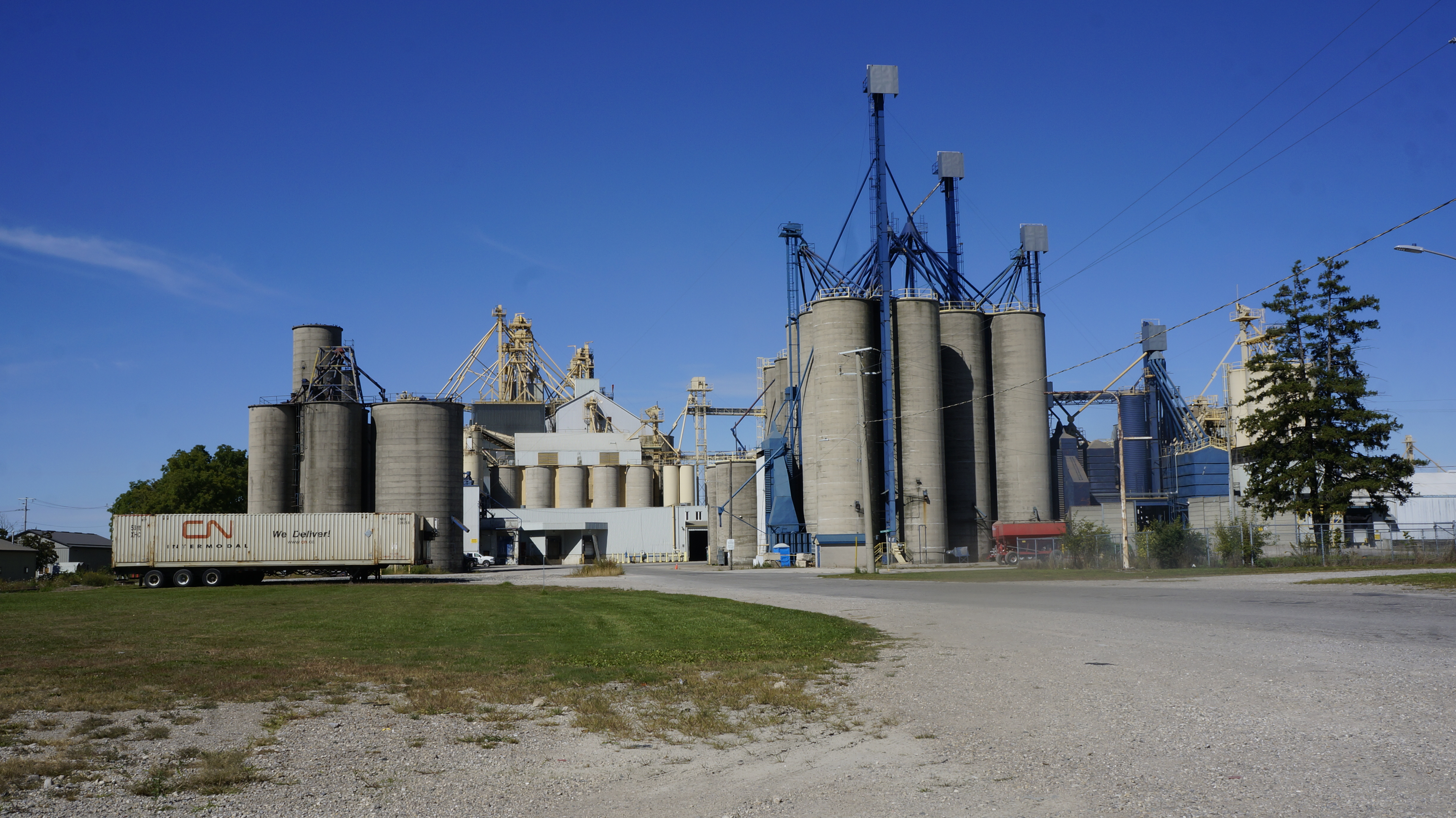
Hensall Co-op

== History ==
Hensall is known as the White Bean Capital of Canada, built on growth and development that began in the 19th century with traditional farming methods.

Hensall is named after the village of Hensall in Yorkshire, England. Hensall, Ontario was founded by two brothers from Hensall, Yorkshire (George and James Petty), in 1851.

The London, Huron and Bruce Railway was built through Hensall in the 1870s. There was a railway accident at Hensall in 1896, when a brakeman named Alexander Livingston was killed.

In 1896, Hensall had a recorded population of 898. In 1876, Hensall got its first post office.

Hensall has two churches: the Hensall United Church, belonging to the United Church of Canada established around 1887; and Cornerstone Church, belonging to the Fellowship of Evangelical Baptists, which was established on May 1, 2022.

== Geography ==
Hensall is located where Huron Road 84 running east from Zurich bisects Highway 4 running north from Exeter.

Hensall receives bus service from Huron Shores Area Transit on Route 3 which runs from Goderich to Grand Bend, stopping in Bayfield, Hensall, Zurich, and St. Joseph.

== Education ==
Education is provided at the elementary level by Bluewater Coast Elementary School.

== Notable people ==
Jennie Smillie, Canada's first female surgeon, was born in Hensall.

Novelist Trevor Ferguson, aka John Farrow, was born in this community. (Technically, the hospital was in Seaforth, but Hensall was his first home.)
