= Exeter Mohawks =

- City: Exeter, Ontario
- League: WOAA Senior Hockey League
- Division: South
- Operated: c.1980-2009
- Home arena: Exeter Arena
- General manager: Todd McCann
- Head coach: Mark Livermore

Franchise history
- 19xx-2007: Hensall Sherwoods
- 2007-2009: Exeter Mohawks

The Exeter Mohawks were a senior hockey team based out of Exeter, Ontario, Canada. The team was previously known as the Hensall Sherwoods, but relocated to Exeter in the summer of 2007. The Mohawks played in the Western Ontario Athletic Association Senior Hockey League.

== 1980s ==
In the 1980s, the Exeter Mohawks were an Ontario Hockey Association senior hockey club. As members of the Central Senior B Hockey League, the Mohawks were 1988 OHA Senior AA Champions and All-Ontario Senior AA Champions, losing the Col. J. Bourque Trophy Final to the Campbellton Tigers of New Brunswick. The Bourque Trophy was the Eastern Championship of Senior AA hockey and the semi-final of the Hardy Cup.

== 2006–07 Sherwoods season ==
Sherwoods Logo

Hensall slipped a bit from their 18-6-1 record in the 2005–06 season, as they finished with a 13-9-2 record, finishing fourth in the WOAA South Division, and qualifying for the WOAA Sr. "AA" playoffs. In their last game of the season, they were tied with the Milverton Four Wheel Drives in the standings with identical 12-9-2 records, with the winner advancing to the "AA" playoffs, while the loser would play in the "A" playoffs, and the Sherwoods prevailed with a 5–4 victory

They would go on to face the best team in the league in the opening round of the "AA" playoffs, the Lucknow Lancers, and after splitting the first two games of the series, the Lancers would go on and win three in a row to eliminate Hensall and ending their season.

== 2007–08 Mohawks season ==
The Exeter Mohawks opened the season at home against the Lucan-Ilderton Jets, and came out on the wrong side of a 4–1 score. Exeter would record their first win in their second game of the season, defeating the Monkton Wildcats 8–3. The Mohawks would have a very solid season, finishing with a 17-9-0 record, and qualify for the "AA" playoffs, as the team ended up in fourth place in the South Division.

The Mohawks faced the Saugeen Shores Winterhawks in the "AA" quarter-finals, and after losing a very close game in the series opener, the Mohawks won the second game in overtime to even up the series. Exeter fell behind the Winterhawks by losing game three by a 6–2 score, followed by a game four loss by a score of 5–3 to fall behind 3–1 in the series. Saugeen Shores would end the Mohawks season in the fifth game, defeating Exeter 5–4.

== 2008–09 Mohawks season ==
Exeter would struggle throughout the regular season, as the Mohawks finished the season with a 10-9-1 record, earning 21 points and sixth place in the WOAA South Division. This would be the lowest point total for the franchise since the 1998–99 season, when they recorded only 16, when they were known as the Hensall Sherwoods.

The Mohawks opened the post-season against the Tavistock Royals, with the winner advancing to the "AA" playoffs. Exeter lost the series opener by a 3–1 score, however, the Mohawks responded with a 3–2 overtime victory in the second game to even it up. Tavistock came back with a 5–2 win in the third game, before shutting out the Mohawks 7–0 in the fourth game to take a 3–1 series lead. Exeter kept the fifth game close, sending it into overtime, before the Royals scored in the extra period to win the game 6–5, and send Exeter to the "A" playoffs. The Mohawks opponent has not yet been determined.

== Season-by-season record ==
Note: GP = Games played, W = Wins, L = Losses, T= Tie, OTL = Overtime Losses, Pts = Points, GF = Goals for, GA = Goals against

Season	GP	W	L	T	OTL	GF	GA	PTS	Finish	Playoffs
1998-99	24	7	15	2	0	--	--	16	10th WOAA Sr	
1999-00	24	18	5	1	0	--	--	37	3rd WOAA Sr	
2000-01	24	17	6	0	1	--	--	35	2nd WOAA South	
2001-02	24	17	4	2	1	127	66	37	2nd WOAA South	
2002-03	24	16	8	0	0	145	81	32	5th WOAA Sr	
2003-04	24	15	7	2	0	124	101	32	6th WOAA Sr	
2004-05	25	17	5	2	1	130	77	37	4th WOAA Sr	
2005-06	25	18	6	-	1	124	83	37	6th WOAA Sr	Lost "AA" QF
2006-07	24	13	9	-	2	127	103	28	4th WOAA South	Lost "AA" QF
2007-08	26	17	9	-	0	115	88	34	4th WOAA South	Lost "AA" QF
2008-09	20	10	9	-	1	89	88	21	6th WOAA South	TBD

More information will be added as more becomes available

== Related links ==
- Exeter, Ontario
- Western Ontario Athletic Association
- WOAA Senior Hockey League
