= Monkton Wildcats =

- City: Monkton, Ontario
- League: WOAA Senior Hockey League
- Division: South
- Folded: 2014
- Home arena: Elma-Logan Arena
- Colours: Blue, Orange, and White

The Monkton Wildcats were a senior hockey team based in Monkton, Ontario, Canada. They played in the Western Ontario Athletic Association Senior Hockey League, and closed prior to the 2014-15 hockey season.

== Championships ==
The Monkton Wildcats won the 1999-2000 Senior "A" championship, and were also Intermediate "B" champions in 1987-88, however they failed to capture the WOAA Grand Championship that year.

== 2006–07 Wildcats season ==
Monkton, coming off an 8-17-0 season in 2005-06, slipped a little bit, going 7-17-0, and finishing in eighth place in the South Division. The Wildcats were given a bit of a scare in their opening playoff round against the Thedford Dirty Dogs before winning the series two games to one. The Wildcats opened the series with a close 6-5 victory, before Thedford turned the tables in game two and won 2-1, the first ever victory for the Dirty Dogs franchise (they had gone 0-23-1 in the regular season), before Monkton closed the series off with another hard-fought victory, winning by a score of 3-2.

The Wildcats would go on to face the Durham Thundercats in the "A" quarter-finals, and the teams would split the first four games, with both of Monkton's wins coming in overtime. Durham would then play a very tight defensive game, holding Monkton to one goal in the final two games, to eliminate the Wildcats from post-season play.

== 2007–08 Wildcats season ==
The Wildcats would have their best season since 2003-04, as the team had a record of 10-15-1, earning 21 points, however, they would remain in eighth place in the South Division.

Monkton would face off against the Wingham Bulls in a best of three qualifying series, with the winner advancing to the WOAA "A" playoffs. The Wildcats would easily win the series opener, defeating the Bulls 10-5, and then complete the series sweep with a close 7-6 win in the second game.

The Wildcats would face the Palmerston 81's in the "A" quarter-finals, and Monkton would surprise Palmerston by winning the series opener 4-3 in OT, followed by a solid 2-1 win in the second game to take a 2-0 series lead. Palmerston stormed back, winning the next two games to even the series up, however, Monkton would once again take the series lead with a 4-0 shutout in the fifth game. The Wildcats were unable to close out the series in the sixth game, as Palmerston won by a 4-3 score, and the 81's would complete the comeback, defeating Monkton in the seventh and final game 5-4, eliminating Monkton from the playoffs.

== 2008–09 Wildcats season ==
Monkton would once again improve in the regular season, as they finished at the .500 level for the first time in over ten years, as the Wildcats had a record of 9-9-2, earning 20 points, and seventh place in the WOAA South Division.

The Wildcats would open the playoffs against the Lucan-Ilderton Jets, who finished in second place in the South Division. The winner of the best of seven series would advance to the "AA" playoffs. The Jets opened the series up with a 4-1 win, however, Monkton evened the series up in the second game, defeating Lucan-Ilderton 3-1. The Wildcats took the series lead in the third game, stunning the Jets with a 5-4 overtime win in Lucan. Monkton stayed hot in the fourth game, shutting out Lucan-Ilderton 1-0 to take a 3-1 series lead. The Wildcats were able to complete the upset, defeating Lucan-Ilderton 4-2 in the fifth game, and advance to the "AA" playoffs. Monkton will face the Petrolia Squires in the "AA" quarter-finals.

== Season-by-season record ==
Note: GP = Games played, W = Wins, L = Losses, T= Tie, OTL = Overtime Losses, Pts = Points, GF = Goals for, GA = Goals against

| Season | GP | W | L | T | OTL | GF | GA | PTS | Finish | Playoffs |
|---|---|---|---|---|---|---|---|---|---|---|
| 1998-99 | 24 | 3 | 21 | 0 | 1 | -- | -- | 7 | 11th WOAA Sr | |
| 1999-00 | 25 | 8 | 15 | 1 | 1 | -- | -- | 18 | 11th WOAA Sr | "A" Champions |
| 2000-01 | 25 | 3 | 17 | 4 | 1 | -- | -- | 11 | 7th WOAA South | |
| 2001-02 | 24 | 1 | 21 | 1 | 1 | 46 | 146 | 4 | 7th WOAA South | |
| 2002-03 | 25 | 9 | 15 | 0 | 1 | 97 | 115 | 19 | 10th WOAA Sr | |
| 2003-04 | 24 | 10 | 11 | 1 | 2 | 82 | 102 | 23 | 9th WOAA Sr | |
| 2004-05 | 25 | 6 | 14 | 2 | 3 | 87 | 116 | 17 | 13th WOAA Sr | |
| 2005-06 | 25 | 8 | 17 | - | 0 | 83 | 131 | 16 | 11th WOAA Sr | Lost "A" Final |
| 2006-07 | 24 | 7 | 17 | - | 0 | 99 | 136 | 14 | 8th WOAA South | Lost "A" QF |
| 2007-08 | 26 | 10 | 15 | - | 1 | 107 | 111 | 21 | 8th WOAA South | Lost "A" QF |
| 2008-09 | 20 | 9 | 9 | - | 2 | 92 | 88 | 20 | 7th WOAA South | Lost "AA" QF |
| 2009-10 | 20 | 14 | 5 | - | 1 | 80 | 60 | 29 | 3rd WOAA South | Lost "AA" QF |
| 2010-11 | 26 | 20 | 3 | - | 3 | 125 | 62 | 43 | 2nd WOAA South | Lost "AA" Final |
| 2011-12 | 24 | 8 | 16 | - | 0 | 69 | 86 | 16 | 7th WOAA South | |
| 2012-13 | 24 | 10 | 11 | - | 3 | 91 | 83 | 23 | 7th WOAA South | |
| 2013-14 | 24 | 9 | 9 | - | 6 | 82 | 108 | 24 | 6th WOAA South | Lost Div. Quarter-final |

== See also ==
- Western Ontario Athletic Association
- WOAA Senior Hockey League
