= Theo Peckham =

Canadian ice hockey player

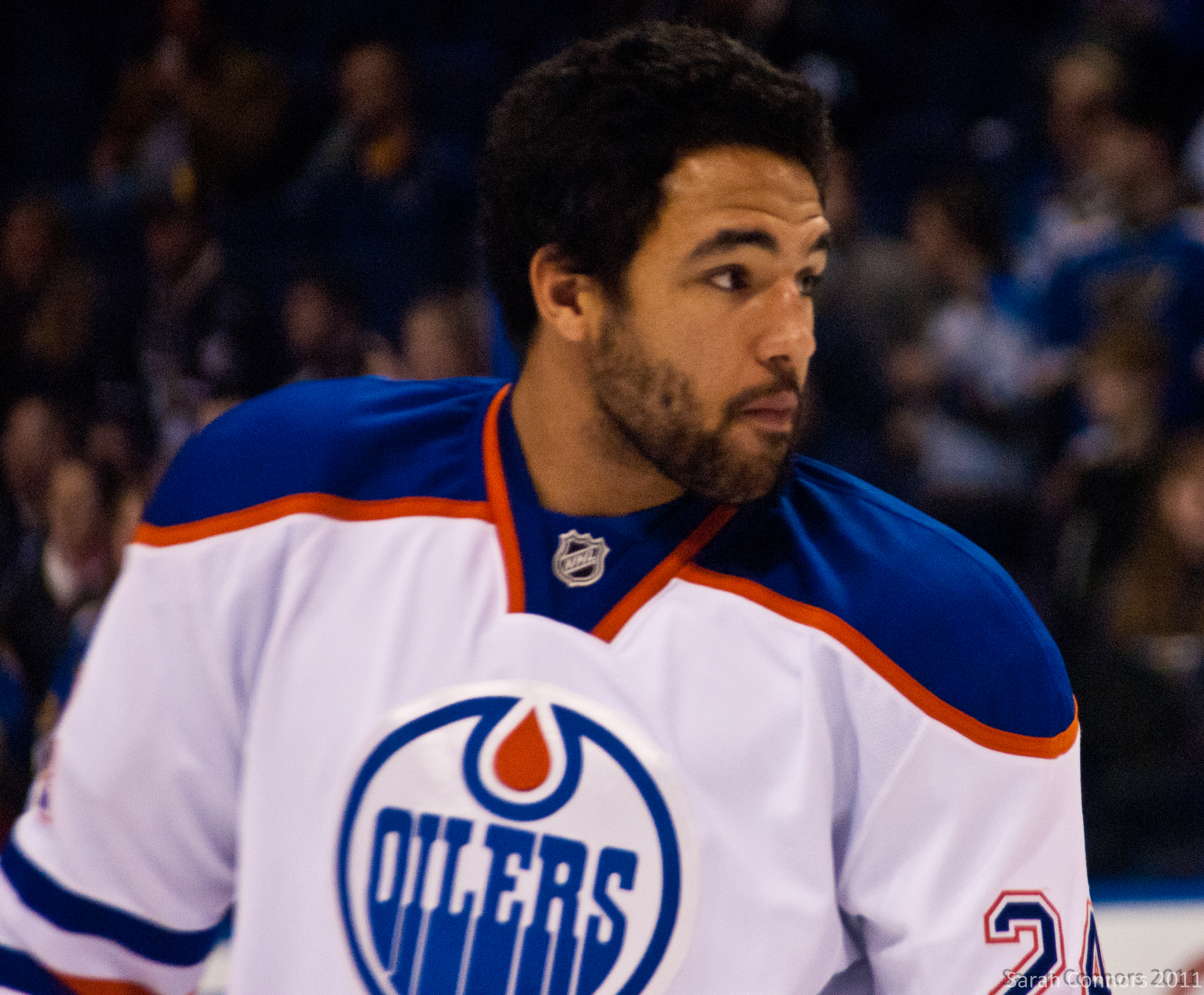
- Peckham in 2012 with the Edmonton Oilers.
- Born: November 10, 1987 (age 38) Richmond Hill, Ontario, Canada
- Height: 6 ft 2 in (188 cm)
- Weight: 246 lb (112 kg; 17 st 8 lb)
- Position: Defence
- Shot: Left
- Played for: Edmonton Oilers; HC ’05 Banská Bystrica; Rødovre Mighty Bulls
- NHL draft: 75th overall, 2006; Edmonton Oilers
- Playing career: 2007–2016

Theo "Teddy" Peckham (born November 10, 1987) is a Canadian former professional ice hockey defenceman who is currently signed with the Saugeen Shores Winterhawks of the Ontario Elite Hockey League. He is the half-brother of Angela James, one of the first female hockey players to be inducted into the Hockey Hall of Fame. Their father, Leo James, was an African American from Mississippi who came to Canada to escape racial segregation.

== Playing career ==
Peckham was drafted 75th overall in the 2006 NHL entry draft by the Edmonton Oilers. He made his NHL debut for the Oilers on March 7, 2008, against the Columbus Blue Jackets in what would be his only appearance of that NHL season.

Peckham was called up by the Oilers from the Springfield Falcons on February 13, 2009, and played 15 NHL games that season. He scored his first point against the Nashville Predators on March 2, 2010.

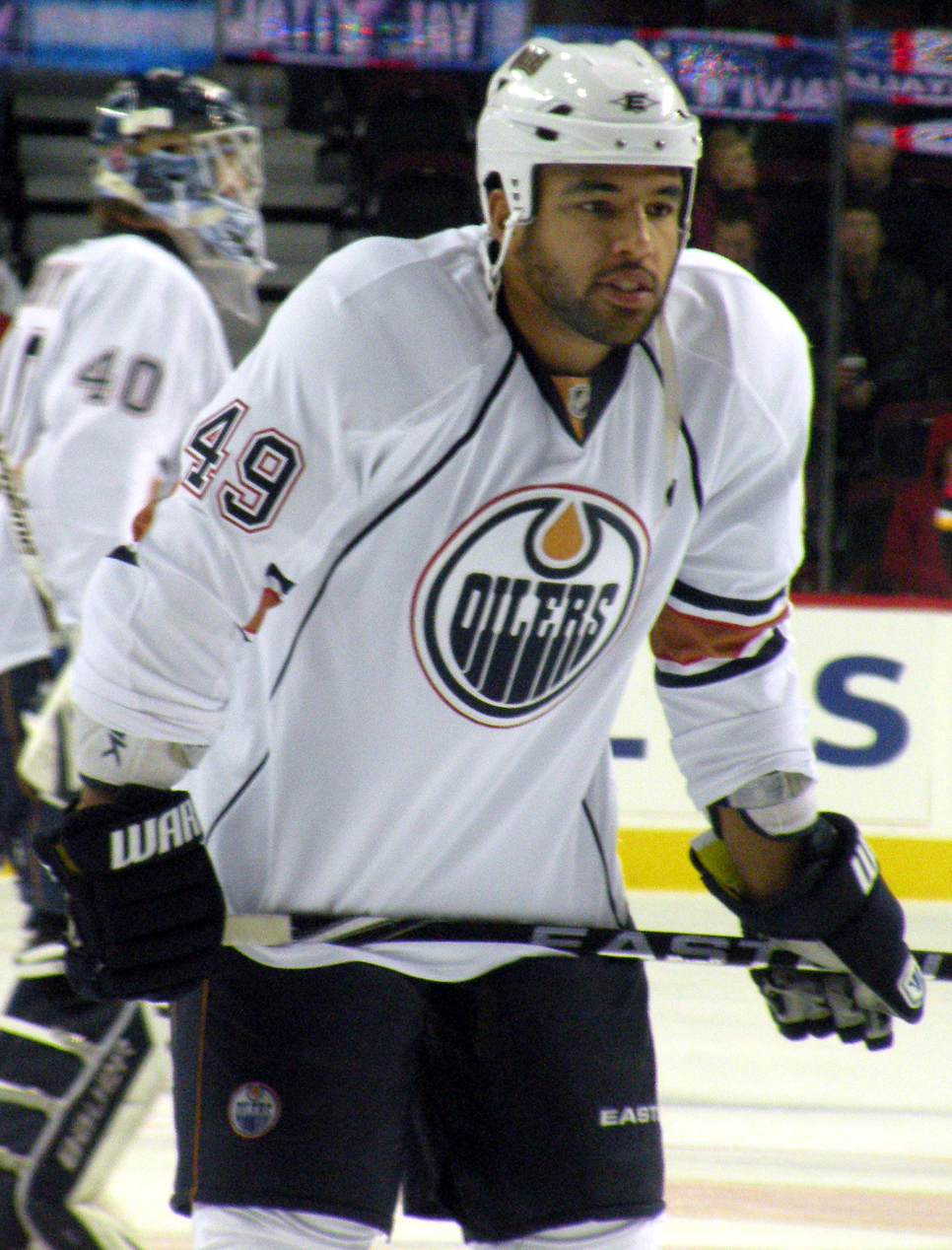
Peckham with the Oilers in October 2010.

His first NHL goal was scored the following season on November 11, 2010, against the Detroit Red Wings.

On July 4, 2011, Peckham was re-signed by the Oilers to a one-year contract.

On July 16, 2012, the Oilers re-signed Peckham to a one-year contract. During the NHL lockout, on November 5, 2012, Peckham signed with the San Francisco Bulls of the ECHL to keep in game shape. He played in four games for 11 penalty minutes before leaving the team, never reaching NHL physical form.

On July 19, 2013, the Chicago Blackhawks signed Peckham as a free agent to a one-year contract. He was assigned to AHL affiliate, the Rockford IceHogs for the duration of the 2013–14 season.

On October 11, 2014, Peckham signed a one-year contract with the new ECHL entrant, the Wichita Thunder. With the retirement of Andrew Martens, Peckham was selected as team captain to open the 2014–15 season. Peckham led the Thunder in 26 games for 8 points before opting for a release of his contract in order to pursue a career abroad. On December 31, 2014, Peckham agreed to a contract with HC ’05 Banská Bystrica of the Slovak Extraliga. He featured in only 5 games over the course of a month before opting to depart for his third team in the season, with Danish club, Rødovre Mighty Bulls of the Metal Ligaen on January 27, 2015.

During the following off-season, Peckham agreed to a one-year contract to move to England, in signing with the Nottingham Panthers. Peckham later reneged his deal with the Panthers to later return to North America and signing a one-year deal with former ECHL club, the Wichita Thunder on October 8, 2015. After spending the remainder of the 2015–16 season with the Thunder, Peckham as a free agent in the following off-season opted to continue in the ECHL, signing with the Rapid City Rush on September 26, 2016. Peckham was released from the Rapid City Rush on September 30, 2016.

Peckham then signed a contract with the Saugeen Shores Winterhawks of the WOAA. He played a season with them before signing with the Hamilton Steelhawks of the ACH the following year.

Shortly into the 2023-2024 season, Peckham signed to the Elora Rocks of the Western Ontario Super Hockey League

== Career statistics ==
			Regular season					Playoffs
Season	Team	League	GP	G	A	Pts	PIM	GP	G	A	Pts	PIM
2003–04	North York Rangers	OPJHL	29	1	4	5	44	—	—	—	—	—
2004–05	Owen Sound Attack	OHL	61	1	9	10	209	8	0	0	0	8
2005–06	Owen Sound Attack	OHL	67	6	9	15	236	11	1	6	7	32
2006–07	Owen Sound Attack	OHL	53	10	25	35	173	4	0	1	1	0
2007–08	Springfield Falcons	AHL	59	6	7	13	174	—	—	—	—	—
2007–08	Edmonton Oilers	NHL	1	0	0	0	2	—	—	—	—	—
2008–09	Springfield Falcons	AHL	47	6	13	19	107	—	—	—	—	—
2008–09	Edmonton Oilers	NHL	15	0	0	0	59	—	—	—	—	—
2009–10	Springfield Falcons	AHL	37	0	6	6	106	—	—	—	—	—
2009–10	Edmonton Oilers	NHL	15	0	1	1	43	—	—	—	—	—
2010–11	Edmonton Oilers	NHL	71	3	10	13	198	—	—	—	—	—
2011–12	Edmonton Oilers	NHL	54	1	2	3	80	—	—	—	—	—
2012–13	San Francisco Bulls	ECHL	4	0	0	0	11	—	—	—	—	—
2012–13	Edmonton Oilers	NHL	4	0	0	0	6	—	—	—	—	—
2012–13	Oklahoma City Barons	AHL	4	0	1	1	29	—	—	—	—	—
2013–14	Rockford IceHogs	AHL	45	0	6	6	100	—	—	—	—	—
2014–15	Wichita Thunder	ECHL	26	2	6	8	46	—	—	—	—	—
2014–15	HC ’05 Banská Bystrica	Slovak	5	0	1	1	8	—	—	—	—	—
2014–15	Rødovre Mighty Bulls	DNK	4	0	2	2	0	5	0	0	0	6
2015–16	Wichita Thunder	ECHL	16	0	0	0	37	—	—	—	—	—
2016–17	Saugeen Shores Winterhawks	WOAA	18	5	10	15	86	11	0	4	4	12
2017–18	Hamilton Steelhawks	ACH	20	4	12	16	43	5	0	3	3	32
2018–19	Hamilton Steelhawks	ACH	23	1	7	8	64	6	1	0	1	6
2019–20	Saugeen Shores Winterhawks	WOAA	10	2	7	9	18	3	0	1	1	4
2021–22	Shallow Lake Crushers	WOAA	2	0	1	1	0	—	—	—	—	—
2023–24	Elora Rocks	OSHL	3	3	0	3	7	1	0	0	0	0
AHL totals			192	12	33	45	516	—	—	—	—	—
NHL totals			160	4	13	17	388	—	—	—	—	—
