= Shelburne Muskies =

- City: Shelburne, Ontario
- League: Ontario Elite Hockey League
- Division: North
- Founded: c. 1935
- Home arena: Centre Dufferin Recreation Complex
- Colours: Red, White, and Blue
- Head coach: Ryan Harnett

The Shelburne Muskies are a men's senior "AA" ice hockey team based in Shelburne, Ontario, Canada. They play in the Ontario Elite Hockey League (OEHL) and host home games at the Centre Dufferin Recreation Complex.

Founded c. 1935, the team historically played in the Western Ontario Athletic Association (WOAA) Senior Hockey League. In the summer of 2023 ten of the twelve existing teams voted to leave WOAA Senior Hockey League and reform under the umbrella of the Ontario Hockey Association. Shelburne sat out for two seasons and returned as an OEHL expansion team for the 2025–26 season.

== Championships ==
In 1982, the Muskies won their eighth COHL title since 1935. Their seventh came in 1972.

The Shelburne Muskies have won one championship, in 1997–98 when they were crowned WOAA Sr. "A" champions. Head coach was Barry Trood and assistant coach was Mark Taylor, trainers Sue Snider and Charmaine Archbold. The Muskies faced off against the Arthur Tigers in the first round, defeating them 4 games to 2. In the semifinals the first-place Muskies in the North played another tough series against the second-place Wiarton Redmen with the Muskies once again coming out on top, winning that series in six games including game 6 in Wiarton. The final had the Muskies playing a best-of-five series against the south champion "Clinton Radars". The Muskies took the championship 3 games to 0 including what was one of the best goaltending performances by two goaltenders ever in the Shelburne arena in game 3. Ron Webster managed to stone the Radars through near 6 periods of hockey in game 3 as the Muskies won the championship with a 1-0 double-overtime win. Over 130 shots were fired combined before defenceman Scruton scored in the second O/T period. Mike Murray was the captain of the team and the championship was dedicated to late longtime Muskies booster Clarence "Fleet" White.

== 2006–07 Muskies season ==
After starting off the season pretty average, sitting with a 6-4-0 record in their first ten games, the Muskies turned it up a notch and finished the year 12-2-0, finishing in 2nd place in the North Division, and qualifying for the WOAA Sr. "AA" playoffs.

They faced off against the Tavistock Royals in the quarter-finals, and quickly fell behind them two games to none before storming back and taking a 3-2 lead in the series. However, the Muskies could not close out the series, as Tavistock rallied back and won the series in seven games.

== 2007–08 Muskies season ==
Shelburne would have another strong regular season, finishing the season with an 18-7-1 record, and finishing in fourth place in the North Division to qualify for the "AA" playoffs.

The Muskies would open the playoffs against the Tavistock Royals, who finished with the best record in the league. Shelburne surprised the Royals in the series opener, winning 6-5 on the road, but Tavistock stormed back with a 6-1 win in the second game. The Muskies would put up a good fight in the third game, but fell short, losing 4-2, then losing a wild fourth game, which saw the Muskies come back from a 6-1 deficit to take the game into overtime, but allowed the game-winning goal within the first minute of the extra period. Shelburne could not rebound from the loss, as Tavistock closed out the series in the fifth game, eliminating the Muskies for the second straight season in the quarter-finals.

== 2008–09 Muskies season ==
The Muskies would have a very solid regular season, finishing third in the WOAA North Division with a record of 15-5-0, earning 30 points. Shelburne scored a WOAA high 142 goals, which included a 20-0 shutout victory against the Nottawasaga River Rats.

Shelburne faced the Ripley Wolves in the "AA" qualification round, with the winner of the best of seven series advancing to the "AA" quarter-finals. The Muskies opened the series with a solid 5-3 victory, followed by a blowout 7-1 win in the second game to take control of the series. In the third game, the Wolves were able to keep the score close, however, Shelburne prevailed with a 5-3 victory to take a 3-0 series lead. The fourth game was another close one, and the Muskies were able to hold off Ripley for a 5-4 victory to sweep the series and advance to the "AA" quarter-finals.

The Muskies faced off against the Elora Rocks in the "AA" quarter-finals. Shelburne took control of the series early, winning the first two games by identical 6-3 scores to take a 2-0 series lead. Elora fought back in the third game, defeating the Muskies 6-5 in overtime to get themselves back into the series. The Muskies responded in the fourth game, defeating the Rocks 7-5 to take a commanding 3-1 series lead. The Rocks staved off elimination in the fifth game, defeating Shelburne 7-4, however, the Muskies were able to close out the series in the sixth game, defeating Elora 8-7 in overtime to advance to the next round.

The Muskies next opponent would the Saugeen Shores Winterhawks in the "AA" semi-finals. The Winterhawks took the series opener with by a close score of 4-3, followed by a dominating 6-1 victory in the second game to take a 2-0 series lead. Saugeen Shores continued to have their way with the Muskies in the third game, easily defeating Shelburne 7-2 to push the Muskies on the brink of elimination. Shelburne responded with a 6-0 victory in the fourth game, followed by a 5-4 win in the fifth game to cut the Winterhawks series lead to 3-2. Shelburne would continue their comeback in the sixth game, winning 5-2 to even the series. Saugeen Shores would spoil the Muskies comeback bid in the seventh game, ending Shelburne's season with an overtime victory to knock the Muskies out of the playoffs.

== 2009–18 Muskies season ==
Shelburne improved on their regular season record from the previous season, as they had an impressive 15-2-3 record, earning 33 points and a second-place finish in the WOAA North Division. The Muskies had the second highest goal total in the league, scoring 127 goals, while they finished with a league best 54 goals against.

The Muskies faced the Palmerston 81's in the best of five "AA" qualifying series. In the series opener, Shelburne easily handled Palmerston, defeating the 81's 6-3 to take the series lead. The Muskies defeated the 81's in the second game by a 5-2 score, followed by a close 4-3 win in the third game to sweep the series and advance to the "AA" playoffs.

The Shelburne Muskies 2017-18 season took another step in the right direction with the team moving up to 5th place in the 13 team WOAA League with an 11-9-0 record up from the previous 2016-17 season record of 8-11-1 (11th place). The team went out 4 straight games to the Tillsonburg Thunder in the first round of the "AA" playoffs which was their first appearance in 7 years. Luke Richardson was the team's top scorer in 2017-18 while Eddie Davey played the majority of the games in goal.

== Season-by-season record ==
Note: GP = Games played, W = Wins, L = Losses, T= Tie, OTL = Overtime Losses, Pts = Points, GF = Goals for, GA = Goals against

Season	GP	W	L	T	OTL	GF	GA	PTS	Finish	Playoffs
1977-78	24	13	8	3	–	142	121	29	2nd COHL	
1978-79	25	16	8	1	–	173	128	33	2nd COHL	
1979-80	24	16	8	0	–	146	147	32	3rd COHL	
1980-81	20	8	9	3	–	95	104	19	3rd COHL	
1981-82	20	18	1	1	–	149	62	37	1st COHL	Won League
1982-83	22	16	2	4	–	150	63	36	1st COHL	
1983-84	Statistics Not Available									
1984-85	24	15	5	4	–	116	80	34	1st NIBHL	
1985-86	6	1	3	2	–	24	34	4	2nd NIBHL	Lost final
1986-87	24	6	17	1	–	120	148	13	4th GBSAHL	
1987-88	20	11	9	0	–	135	118	22	2nd NSBHL	
1988-89	24	8	12	4	–	104	133	20	6th CSBHL	
1989-90	26	6	16	4	–	103	144	16	6th NSBHL	
1990-91	24	1	22	1	–	85	232	3	5th NSAHL	Lost quarter-final
1991-92	23	5	16	2	–	--	--	12	4th NSAHL	Lost quarter-final
1993-94	20	1	18	1	–	72	178	3	11th WOAA Sr. A	Did not qualify
1994-95	24	11	13	0	0	157	144	22	7th WOAA Sr. A	Lost in "AA" quarter-finals (0-4 vs. Royals)
1995-96	21	4	16	1	0	98	150	9	7th WOAA Sr. AA	Lost in "AA" quarter-finals (2-4 vs. Winterhawks)
1996-97	22	17	4	0	1	164	102	35	1st WOAA Sr. A	Won in "A" preliminary round (4-2 vs. Radars); Lost in "A" semi-finals (3-4 vs. Wolves)
1997-98	24	17	6	1	0	156	120	35	1st Sr. A East	Won in divisional semi-finals (4-2 vs. Tigers); Won in divisional finals (4-2 vs. Redmen); Won Sr. "A" finals (3-0 vs. Radars)
1998-99	24	15	8	0	1	119	108	31	2nd Sr. A East	Won in divisional semi-finals (4-2 vs. Redmen); Lost in divisional finals (3-4 vs. 81's)
1999-2000	24	12	8	2	2	142	130	28	4th in North	Lost in divisional semi-finals (2-4 vs. 81's)
2000-01	24	16	7	0	1	136	106	33	3rd in North	Lost in "AA" quarter-finals (3-4 vs. Sherwoods)
2001-02	24	11	8	2	3	113	97	27	3rd in North	Lost in "AA" quarter-finals (0-4 vs. 81's)
2002-03	24	14	9	0	1	146	99	29	8th in WOAA	Lost in "AA" quarter-finals (1-4 vs. Thundercats)
2003-04	24	14	9	1	0	107	85	29	7th in WOAA	Won in "AA" qualifying round (3-1 vs. Spitfires); Lost in "AA" quarter-finals (1-4 vs. Thundercats)
2004-05	25	18	6	1	0	148	92	37	3rd in WOAA	Won in "AA" qualifying round (3-0 vs. River Rats); Lost in "AA" quarter-finals (0-4 vs. 81's)
2005-06	25	19	3	–	3	137	76	41	3rd in WOAA	Won in "AA" qualifying round (3-0 vs. Wolves); Won in "AA" quarter-finals (4-3 vs. Sherwoods); Lost in "AA" semi-finals (2-4 vs. Rocks)
2006-07	24	18	6	–	0	129	88	36	2nd in North	Lost in "AA" quarter-finals (3-4 vs. Royals)
2007-08	26	18	7	–	1	175	106	37	4th in North	Lost in "AA" quarter-finals (1-4 vs. Royals)
2008-09	20	15	5	–	0	142	72	30	3rd in North	Won in "AA" qualifying round (4-0 vs. Wolves); Won in "AA" quarter-finals (4-2 vs. Rocks); Lost in "AA" semi-finals (3-4 vs. Winterhawks)
2009-10	20	15	2	–	3	127	54	33	2nd in North	Won in "AA" qualifying round (3-0 vs. 81's); Lost in "AA" quarter-finals (1-4 vs. Winterhawks)
2010-11	26	18	8	–	0	135	93	36	3rd in North	Won in divisional quarter-finals (4-0 vs. Wolves); Lost in divisional semi-finals (1-4 vs. Rocks)
2011-12	24	16	6	–	2	125	88	34	3rd in North	Won in divisional quarter-finals (4-2 vs. Wolves); Lost in divisional semi-finals (2-4 vs. Rocks)
2012-13	24	16	8	–	0	117	99	32	3rd in North	Won in divisional quarter-finals (4-2 vs. Crushers); Lost in divisional semi-finals (0-4 vs. Winterhawks)
2013-14	24	7	17	–	0	85	128	14	7th in North	Lost in divisional quarter-finals (0-4 vs. Rocks)
2014-15	24	4	19	–	1	49	138	9	7th in North	Placed 5th in "A" round-robin (1-4)
2015-16	24	5	17	–	2	88	106	12	6th in North	Placed 4th in "A" round-robin (1-3); Lost in "A" semi-finals (0-4 vs. Wolves)
2016-17	20	7	11	–	2	74	93	16	11th in WOAA	Lost in "A" quarter-finals (1-2 vs. Rocks)
2017-18	20	11	9	–	0	85	79	22	5th in WOAA	Lost in "AA" quarter-finals (0-4 vs. Thunder)
2018-19	22	11	11	–	0	101	88	22	10th in WOAA	Lost in "A" semi-finals (1-4 vs. Rocks)
2019-20	22	17	5	–	0	95	71	34	2nd in WOAA	Lost in "A" semi-finals (2-4 vs. 81's)
2020–21	Season cancelled due to COVID-19									
2021-22	17	8	9	–	0	72	71	16	8th in WOAA	Lost in "AA" quarter-finals (0-4 vs. Wolves)
2022-23	20	3	15	–	2	54	103	8	11th in WOAA	Lost in "A" semi-finals (3-4 vs. Drives)
2025-26	20	3	15	–	2	62	128	8	8th in North	Won in preliminary round (2-1 vs. Coyotes); Lost in divisional quarter-finals (0-4 vs. Wolves); Lost in McLean Trophy semi-finals (0-4 vs. Winterhawks)

More information will be added as more becomes available

== Related links ==
- Shelburne, Ontario
- Western Ontario Athletic Association
- WOAA Senior Hockey League
