= 2024–25 OEHL season =

2nd season of the Ontario Elite Hockey League

- League: Ontario Elite Hockey League
- Sport: Hockey
- Duration: Regular season October 5, 2024 – February 2, 2025; Playoffs; February 7, 2025 – March 2025
- Teams: 11
- Finals champions: J. F. Paxton Trophy: Minto 81's Hugh McLean Trophy: Durham Thundercats

OEHL seasons
- 2023–24 2025–26

The 2024–25 OEHL season was the second season of the Ontario Elite Hockey League. The league played a 20-game regular season which began on October 5, 2024 and concluded on February 2, 2025. The post-season began on February 7, 2025 and concluded on March 29, 2025.

The Minto 81's won the J. F. Paxton Trophy, as they defeated the Ripley Wolves in the final round, qualifying for the Allan Cup. At the Allan Cup, the 81's lost to the Wentworth Gryphins in the semi-finals.

== Off-season ==
=== Allan Cup ===
The Allan Cup is awarded annually to the senior ice hockey champions of Canada.

On May 8, 2024, the Ontario Elite Hockey League announced that OEHL member clubs are now eligible to compete for the Allan Cup, which is Canada's national senior hockey championship.

The "AA" champions will face off against the winners from the ACH in a best-of-three series for the OHA's Senior Hockey Championship.

The winning team will be declared Ontario's Senior Hockey champion and will represent Ontario at the Allan Cup Challenge Tournament.

=== Expansion strategy ===
On June 24, the OEHL and Allan Cup Hockey held discussions in Kincardine, Ontario that expansion of both leagues is a top priority over the next calendar year.

The OEHL is committed to keeping Senior "AA" hockey true to its roots in small town Ontario. The league will only consider expansion applicants from communities with a population of 20,000 or less.

=== Ticket pricing ===
The OEHL announced the introduction of a standardized ticket pricing system which is designed to keep games accessible for local communities.

Adult tickets for regular-season games will be priced at $10 across the league, ensuring affordability for fans. OEHL clubs have the flexibility to offer discounts for students and seniors, making it even easier for families to enjoy live hockey at their local arenas. This change reflects the league's commitment to providing family-friendly entertainment at reasonable prices, a core value of senior hockey in small-town Ontario.

== Regular season ==
=== Final standings ===
Note: GP = Games played; W = Wins; L= Losses; OTL = Overtime losses; GF = Goals for; GA = Goals against; Pts = Points; Green shade = Clinched playoff spot

| Rank | Team | GP | W | L | OTL | Pts | GF | GA |
|---|---|---|---|---|---|---|---|---|
| 1 | Ripley Wolves | 20 | 18 | 0 | 2 | 38 | 114 | 59 |
| 2 | Seaforth Centenaires | 20 | 15 | 4 | 1 | 31 | 92 | 51 |
| 3 | Minto 81's | 20 | 14 | 6 | 0 | 28 | 99 | 58 |
| 4 | Tavistock Royals | 20 | 13 | 7 | 0 | 26 | 93 | 65 |
| 5 | Saugeen Shores Winterhawks | 20 | 11 | 8 | 1 | 23 | 100 | 87 |
| 6 | Creemore Coyotes | 20 | 9 | 9 | 2 | 20 | 84 | 73 |
| 7 | Georgian Bay Applekings | 20 | 9 | 9 | 2 | 20 | 95 | 87 |
| 8 | Erin Outlaws | 20 | 8 | 9 | 3 | 19 | 83 | 100 |
| 9 | Durham Thundercats | 20 | 8 | 12 | 0 | 16 | 87 | 100 |
| 10 | Milverton Four Wheel Drives | 20 | 5 | 13 | 2 | 12 | 63 | 109 |
| 11 | Lucknow Lancers | 20 | 0 | 20 | 0 | 0 | 30 | 151 |

=== Scoring leaders ===
Note: GP = Games played; G = Goals; A = Assists; Pts = Points; PIM = Penalty minutes

| Player | Team | GP | G | A | Pts | PIM |
|---|---|---|---|---|---|---|
| Garrett Meurs | Ripley Wolves | 18 | 26 | 16 | 42 | 30 |
| Brody LeBlanc | Durham Thundercats | 20 | 20 | 17 | 37 | 6 |
| Kyler Nixon | Durham Thundercats | 17 | 10 | 23 | 33 | 17 |
| Luke Pither | Saugeen Shores Winterhawks | 14 | 12 | 20 | 32 | 8 |
| Nick Giamou | Erin Outlaws | 20 | 12 | 20 | 32 | 2 |
| Ethan Skinner | Ripley Wolves | 16 | 14 | 17 | 31 | 60 |
| Todd Hellyer | Ripley Wolves | 18 | 8 | 23 | 31 | 12 |
| MacKenzie Fleming | Georgian Bay Applekings | 19 | 9 | 21 | 30 | 20 |
| Andy Mitchell | Saugeen Shores Winterhawks | 17 | 12 | 17 | 29 | 16 |
| Evan Buehler | Georgian Bay Applekings | 19 | 12 | 17 | 29 | 0 |

=== Leading goaltenders ===
Note: GP = Games played; Mins = Minutes played; W = Wins; L = Losses: OTL = Overtime losses;
GA = Goals Allowed; SO = Shutouts; GAA = Goals against average

| Player | Team | GP | MINS | W | L | OTL | GA | SO | GAA |
|---|---|---|---|---|---|---|---|---|---|
| Alex Hutcheson | Seaforth Centenaires | 14 | 814 | 10 | 3 | 1 | 38 | 1 | 2.80 |
| Jonathan Reinhart | Minto 81's | 11 | 664 | 9 | 2 | 0 | 32 | 1 | 2.89 |
| Jason Hamilton | Ripley Wolves | 13 | 729 | 11 | 0 | 1 | 36 | 1 | 2.96 |
| Graeme Noye | Tavistock Royals | 14 | 804 | 7 | 6 | 0 | 46 | 0 | 3.43 |
| Mason Kameka | Creemore Coyotes | 18 | 1078 | 7 | 9 | 2 | 68 | 0 | 3.78 |

== Playoffs ==
=== J. F. Paxton Trophy playoffs ===
The top eight teams qualify for the J. F. Paxton Trophy playoffs. Each series is a best-of-seven.

Paxton Trophy quarter-finals
1 | Ripley | 4
8 | Erin | 0
4 | Tavistock | 1
5 | Saugeen Shores | 4
2 | Seaforth | 4
7 | Georgian Bay | 0
3 | Minto | 4
6 | Creemore | 0

Paxton Trophy semi-finals
1 | Ripley | 4
5 | Saugeen Shores | 2
2 | Seaforth | 2
3 | Minto | 4

Paxton Trophy finals
1 | Ripley | 0
3 | Minto | 4

==== J.F. Paxton Trophy quarter-finals ====
===== (1) Ripley Wolves vs. (8) Erin Outlaws =====
| February 7 | Erin Outlaws | 3 – 10 | Ripley Wolves | Ripley-Huron Arena | Recap |
| Joey Warywoda (1) - pp - 16:46 | | First period | 3:27 - Jarred Colling (1) |
| No scoring | | Second period | 14:01 - Ethan Skinner (1); 5:16 - Dan Nicoloff (1); 1:33 - pp - Garrett Meurs (1) |
| Liam Galton (1) - 15:46; Lucas Schott (1) - 1:47 | | Third period | 17:33 - Alex Kuntz (1); 14:50 - Dan Nicoloff (2); 11:08 - Garrett Meurs (2); 7:31 - pp - Drew Davidson (1); 6:17 - Dan Nicoloff (3); 4:09 - Evan Visser (1) |
| William Salnek (0-1, 40 saves / 50 shots) | | Goalie stats | Jason Hamilton (1-0, 25 saves / 28 shots) |

| February 8 | Ripley Wolves | 7 – 0 | Erin Outlaws | Erin Arena | Recap |
| Ethan Skinner (2) - 19:50; Ethan Skinner (3) - 16:33 | | First period | No scoring |
| Gerrit Satosek (1) - 19:28; Cody Britton (1) - 13:19; Tyson Soers (1) - 5:47 | | Second period | No scoring |
| Cody Britton (2) - 10:56; Cody Britton (3) - 10:34 | | Third period | No scoring |
| Jason Hamilton (2-0, 25 saves / 25 shots) | | Goalie stats | William Salnek (0-2, 29 saves / 36 shots) |

| February 21 | Erin Outlaws | 1 – 5 | Ripley Wolves | Ripley-Huron Arena | Recap |
| No scoring | | First period | 0:47 - Garrett Meurs (3) |
| Sean Caruso (1) - 10:24 | | Second period | 8:32 - Kaden Hoggarth (1) |
| No scoring | | Third period | 11:03 - pp - Dan Nicoloff (4); 2:33 - Cody Britton (4); 1:00 - pp - Dawson Fahrer (1) |
| Connor Toogood (0-1, 17 saves / 22 shots) | | Goalie stats | Garrett Golley (1-0, 52 saves / 53 shots) |

| February 22 | Ripley Wolves | 4 – 3 | OT | Erin Outlaws | Erin Arena | Recap |
| No scoring | | First period | | 5:13 - Travis Brown (1) |
| Garrett Meurs (4) - 15:45 | | Second period | | 13:23 - Travis Brown (2) |
| Kaden Hoggarth (2) - 8:41; Brett Catto (1) - 4:59 | | Third period | | 6:54 - Liam Galton (2) |
| Garrett Meurs (5) - 5:00 | | First overtime period | | No scoring |
| Jason Hamilton (3-0, 21 saves / 24 shots) | | Goalie stats | | Connor Toogood (0-2, 46 saves / 50 shots) |

| Ripley wins series 4 – 0 |

===== (2) Seaforth Centenaires vs. (7) Georgian Bay Applekings =====
| February 7 | Georgian Bay Applekings | 1 – 7 | Seaforth Centenaires | Seaforth Community Centre | Recap |
| No scoring | | First period | 5:15 - Jarrett Bogdon (1); 1:20 - Cohen Adair (1) |
| No scoring | | Second period | 13:14 - sh - Jamie Huber (1); 9:44 - Sheldon Pryce (1); 4:21 - pp - Jamie Huber (2) |
| Mackenzie Fleming (1) - pp - 8:58 | | Third period | 8:59 - Camden Daigle (1); 5:37 - pp - Sheldon Pryce (2) |
| Allan Menary (0-1, 22 saves / 29 shots) | | Goalie stats | Alex Hutcheson (1-0, 24 saves / 25 shots) |

| February 8 | Seaforth Centenaires | 3 – 1 | Georgian Bay Applekings | Beaver Valley Arena | Recap |
| No scoring | | First period | 0:49 - Jamie Wise (1) |
| Ray Huether (1) - 15:47 | | Second period | No scoring |
| Kyle Stanbury (1) - pp - 17:06; Camden Daigle (2) - 13:03 | | Third period | No scoring |
| Tyler Parr (1-0, 32 saves / 33 shots) | | Goalie stats | Allan Menary (0-2, 24 saves / 27 shots) |

| February 14 | Georgian Bay Applekings | 2 – 4 | Seaforth Centenaires | Seaforth Community Centre | Recap |
| No scoring | | First period | 7:53 - Cohen Adair (2); 1:16 - pp - Cohen Adair (3) |
| Austin Ulett (1) - sh - 9:59; Matthew Salituro (1) - 0:46 | | Second period | No scoring |
| No scoring | | Third period | 6:26 - Tanner Hertel (1); 1:54 - Cohen Adair (4) |
| Allan Menary (0-3, 41 saves / 45 shots) | | Goalie stats | Alex Hutcheson (2-0, 30 saves / 32 shots) |

| February 15 | Seaforth Centenaires | 9 – 1 | Georgian Bay Applekings | Beaver Valley Arena | Recap |
| Kyle Stanbury (2) - 7:03; Tanner Hertel (2) - 4:53; Jared Nash (1) - 0:28 | | First period | 14:18 - Austin Ulett (2) |
| Mike Siddall (1) - 16:47; Zach Hatch (1) - 14:02; Parker Gibbings (1) - 5:13; Kyle Stanbury (3) - 4:52; Ray Huether (2) - pp - 1:15 | | Second period | No scoring |
| Mike Siddall (2) - 12:20 | | Third period | No scoring |
| Tyler Parr (2-0) | | Goalie stats | Allan Menary (0-4) |

| Seaforth wins series 4 – 0 |

===== (3) Minto 81's vs. (6) Creemore Coyotes =====
Note: Game three was played at Harriston Arena in Harriston, Ontario.

| February 7 | Creemore Coyotes | 2 – 4 | Minto 81's | Palmerston Community Centre | Recap |
| No scoring | | First period | No scoring |
| Scott Dorion (1) - 4:58 | | Second period | 19:46 - Eric Margo (1); 15:23 - pp - Stephen Gibson (1); 5:23 - Klayton Hoelscher (1) |
| Adam Logozzo (1) - 0:08 | | Third period | 17:57 - pp - Klayton Hoelscher (2) |
| Mason Kameka (0-1, 33 saves / 37 shots) | | Goalie stats | Jonathan Reinhart (1-0, 27 saves / 29 shots) |

| February 8 | Minto 81's | 7 – 1 | Creemore Coyotes | Creemore Recreation Centre | Recap |
| Stephen Gibson (2) - pp - 11:43; Blair Butchart (1) - 3:46; Cole Pellett (1) - 1:49 | | First period | 0:01 - Jordan Taylor (1) |
| Adam Kawalec (1) - pp - 14:51; Payton McIsaac (1) - 12:11 | | Second period | No scoring |
| Stephen Gibson (3) - 6:48; Denver Hill (1) - 2:39 | | Third period | No scoring |
| Jonathan Reinhart (2-0, 23 saves / 24 shots) | | Goalie stats | Mason Kameka (0-2, 28 saves / 35 shots) |

| February 21 | Creemore Coyotes | 4 – 6 | Minto 81's | Palmerston Community Centre | Recap |
| Ben Hughes (1) - pp - 15:47; JD Falconer (1) - 1:01 | | First period | 19:40 - Liam Hurley (1); 18:30 - pp - Matthew Murray (1); 1:16 - Matthew Murray (2) |
| JD Falconer (2) - 16:28 | | Second period | 1:27 - Stephen Gibson (4) |
| Ben Hughes (2) - 5:49 | | Third period | 14:42 - pp - Stephen Gibson (5); 10:55 - pp - Adam Kawalec (2) |
| Mason Kameka (0-3) | | Goalie stats | Jonathan Reinhart (3-0) |

| February 22 | Minto 81's | 8 – 5 | Creemore Coyotes | Creemore Recreation Centre | Recap |
| Blair Butchart (2) - 10:12; Caleb Warren (1) - 8:22 | | First period | 7:16 - Jordan Taylor (2) |
| Caleb Warren (2) - 19:17; Steven Grant (1) - 17:49; Owen Torrie (1) - 13:17 | | Second period | 14:54 - Jordan Taylor (3); 4:52 - JD Falconer (3); 3:01 - pp - Josh Graves (1) |
| Steven Grant (2) - 12:53; Chayse Herffort (1) - 6:41; Adam Kawalec (3) - pp - 2:01 | | Third period | 10:43 - pp - Ben Hughes (3) |
| Jonathan Reinhart (4-0, 28 saves / 33 shots) | | Goalie stats | Mason Kameka (0-4, 32 saves / 40 shots) |

| Minto wins series 4 – 0 |

===== (4) Tavistock Royals vs. (5) Saugeen Shores Winterhawks =====
| February 7 | Tavistock Royals | 2 – 5 | Saugeen Shores Winterhawks | Port Elgin Plex | Recap |
| No scoring | | First period | 16:51 - Josh Urbshott (1); 15:29 - pp - Medric Mercier (1); 14:24 - Curtis Johnston (1); 13:36 - Brent MacDermid (1) |
| Sean Kienapple (1) - pp - 11:53; Sean Kienapple (2) - pp - 3:29 | | Second period | No scoring |
| No scoring | | Third period | 10:58 - pp - Andy Mitchell (1) |
| Graeme Noye (0-1, 30 saves / 35 shots) | | Goalie stats | Clayton Fritsch (1-0, 28 saves / 30 shots) |

| February 8 | Saugeen Shores Winterhawks | 2 – 4 | Tavistock Royals | Tavistock Recreation Centre | Recap |
| Miles MacLean (1) - sh - 15:25 | | First period | 18:19 - Andrew Von Boekel (1); 17:55 - Andrew Von Boekel (2) |
| No scoring | | Second period | 0:01 - pp - Sean Kienapple (3) |
| Justin Marlowe (1) - 12:05 | | Third period | 5:11 - Erik Robichaud (1) |
| Clayton Fritsch (1-1, 35 saves / 39 shots) | | Goalie stats | Zach Shomphe (1-0, 45 saves / 47 shots) |

| February 14 | Tavistock Royals | 3 – 4 | OT | Saugeen Shores Winterhawks | Port Elgin Plex | Recap |
| No scoring | | First period | | No scoring |
| Matt Zilke (1) - pp - 1:37; Sean Kienapple (4) - 0:19 | | Second period | | 7:17 - Andy Mitchell (1) |
| Deven Kropf (1) - 8:09 | | Third period | | 18:53 - Luke Pither (1); 1:20 - Luke Pither (2) |
| No scoring | | First overtime period | | 1:22 - Chad Jones (1) |
| Zach Shomphe (1-1, 42 saves / 46 shots) | | Goalie stats | | Clayton Fritsch (2-1, 40 saves / 43 shots) |

| February 15 | Saugeen Shores Winterhawks | 5 – 4 | OT | Tavistock Royals | Tavistock Recreation Centre | Recap |
| Theo Peckham (1) - 11:14 | | First period | | 18:35 - Tristan Hohl (1); 9:42 - pp - Drew Gerth (1) |
| Medric Mercier (2) - pp - 16:09 | | Second period | | 17:57 - Jeremy Munro (1); 15:20 - Mitch Facey (1) |
| Brent MacDermid (2) - pp - 18:25; Jordan Vanhaelemeesch (1) - pp - 3:59 | | Third period | | No scoring |
| Matt Shields (1) - 15:33 | | First overtime period | | No scoring |
| Clayton Fritsch (3-1, 42 saves / 46 shots) | | Goalie stats | | Graeme Noye (0-2, 27 saves / 32 shots) |

| February 21 | Saugeen Shores Winterhawks | 5 – 3 | Tavistock Royals | Tavistock Recreation Centre | Recap |
| No scoring | | First period | No scoring |
| Matt Shields (2) - 8:19; Logan Freiburger (1) - 2:45 | | Second period | 2:02 - Nicolas Thibodeau (1); 0:40 - Tyler Reid (1) |
| Andy Mitchell (3) - 19:51; Miles MacLean (2) - 1:39; Andy Fracz (1) - 0:10 | | Third period | 0:59 - Matt Zilke (2) |
| Clayton Fritsch (4-1, 41 saves / 44 shots) | | Goalie stats | Graeme Noye (0-3, 20 saves / 25 shots) |

| Saugeen Shores wins series 4 – 1 |

==== J.F. Paxton Trophy semi-finals ====
===== (1) Ripley Wolves vs. (5) Saugeen Shores Winterhawks =====
| February 28 | Saugeen Shores Winterhawks | 1 – 7 | Ripley Wolves | Ripley-Huron Arena | Recap |
| Jordan Vanhaelemeesch (2) - 1:52 | | First period | 19:09 - Kaden Hoggarth (2); 3:42 - Pat Looby (1) |
| No scoring | | Second period | 13:07 - pp - Brett Catto (1) |
| No scoring | | Third period | 19:03 - Dan Nicoloff (5); 18:14 - sh - Gerrit Satosek (2); 3:26 - pp - Pat Looby (2); 1:02 - pp- Derek Skinner (1) |
| Clayton Fritsch (4-2, 31 saves / 38 shots) | | Goalie stats | Jason Hamilton (4-0, 31 saves / 32 shots) |

| March 2 | Ripley Wolves | 4 – 3 | Saugeen Shores Winterhawks | Port Elgin Plex | Recap |
| No scoring | | First period | 3:27 - Brent MacDermid (3) |
| Dan Nicoloff (6) - 19:14; Gerrit Satosek (3) - pp - 1:19 | | Second period | 12:52 - Cam Lightfoot (1); 6:44 - pp - Miles MacLean (3) |
| Ethan Skinner (4) - 5:16; Cody Britton (5) - 4:41 | | Third period | No scoring |
| Jason Hamilton (5-0, 38 saves / 41 shots) | | Goalie stats | Clayton Fritsch (4-3, 24 saves / 28 shots) |

| March 7 | Saugeen Shores Winterhawks | 1 – 3 | Ripley Wolves | Ripley-Huron Arena | Recap |
| No scoring | | First period | 4:30 - pp - Dan Nicoloff (7) |
| Medric Mercier (3) - pp - 15:02 | | Second period | 17:33 - pp - Dan Nicoloff (8) |
| No scoring | | Third period | 0:40 - en - Tyson Soers (2) |
| Clayton Fritsch (4-4, 35 saves / 37 shots) | | Goalie stats | Jason Hamilton (6-0, 29 saves / 30 shots) |

| March 8 | Ripley Wolves | 1 – 6 | Saugeen Shores Winterhawks | Port Elgin Plex | Recap |
| Jarred Colling (2) - 7:15 | | First period | 17:25 - pp - Curtis Johnston (2); 15:09 - Curtis Johnston (3) |
| No scoring | | Second period | 11:31 - Curtis Johnston (4) |
| No scoring | | Third period | 13:02 - pp - Justin Marlowe (2); 12:09 - Logan Freiburger (2); 10:56 - sh - Miles MacLean (4) |
| Jason Hamilton (6-1, 23 saves / 29 shots) | | Goalie stats | Clayton Fritsch (5-4, 45 saves / 46 shots) |

| March 14 | Saugeen Shores Winterhawks | 3 – 2 | Ripley Wolves | Ripley-Huron Arena | Recap |
| Luke Pither (3) - 5:42 | | First period | No scoring |
| Miles MacLean (5) - 4:07 | | Second period | 12:08 - pp - Kaden Hoggarth (4); 0:12 - Kaden Hoggarth (5) |
| Luke Pither (4) - 2:30 | | Third period | No scoring |
| Clayton Fritsch (6-4, 31 saves / 33 shots) | | Goalie stats | Jason Hamilton (6-2, 24 saves / 27 shots) |

| March 16 | Ripley Wolves | 5 – 2 | Saugeen Shores Winterhawks | Port Elgin Plex | Recap |
| Tyler McCarthy (1) - 6:50 | | First period | No scoring |
| Evan Visser (2) - 1:59 | | Second period | 3:19 - Chad Jones (2) |
| Cody Britton (6) - 16:00; Brett Catto (3) - pp - 15:15; Brett Catto (4) - 12:41 | | Third period | 1:31 - Justin Donnelly (1) |
| Jason Hamilton (7-2, 43 saves / 45 shots) | | Goalie stats | Clayton Fritsch (6-5, 34 saves / 39 shots) |

| Ripley wins series 4 – 2 |

===== (2) Seaforth Centenaires vs. (3) Minto 81's =====
| March 2 | Seaforth Centenaires | 3 – 5 | Minto 81's | Palmerston Community Centre | Recap |
| No scoring | | First period | 15:41 - Liam Hurley (2) |
| Mike Siddall (3) - pp - 14:10; Braydon Blight (1) - 3:40 | | Second period | 9:53 - Adam Kawalec (4); 4:16 - Blair Butchart (3) |
| Parker Gibbings (2) - 0:32 | | Third period | 15:32 - pp - Blair Butchart (4); 0:51 - Blair Butchart (5) |
| Tyler Parr (2-1) | | Goalie stats | Jonathan Reinhart (5-0) |

| March 7 | Minto 81's | 5 – 4 | OT | Seaforth Centenaires | Seaforth Community Centre | Recap |
| Klayton Hoelscher (3) - 2:39; Klayton Hoelsher (4) - sh - 6:21 | | First period | | 19:18 - Cohen Adair (5) |
| Eric Margo (2) - pp - 6:27 | | Second period | | No scoring |
| Stephen Gibson (6) - sh - 9:51 | | Third period | | 12:20 - pp - Ray Huether (3); 12:07 - pp - Kyle Stanbury (4); 11:31 - pp - Sheldon Price (3) |
| Chayse Herffort (2) - pp - 16:45 | | First overtime period | | No scoring |
| Jonathan Reinhart (6-0, 31 saves / 35 shots) | | Goalie stats | | Alex Hutcheson (2-1, 17 saves / 22 shots) |

| March 8 | Minto 81's | 2 – 4 | Seaforth Centenaires | Seaforth Community Centre | Recap |
| Adam Kawalec (5) - 1:08 | | First period | No scoring |
| No scoring | | Second period | 1:00 - Reuben Smith (1); 0:36 - Camden Daigle (3) |
| Steven Grant (3) - 19:02 | | Third period | 7:44 - Jared Nash (2); 0:32 - en - Holdyn Lansink (1) |
| Jonathan Reinhart (6-1, 35 saves / 38 shots) | | Goalie stats | Tyler Parr (3-1, 29 saves / 31 shots) |

| March 9 | Seaforth Centenaires | 4 – 3 | Minto 81's | Palmerston Community Centre | Recap |
| Jarrett Bodgan (2) - 4:54; Jared Nash (3) - pp - 0:56 | | First period | 13:24 - pp - Klayton Hoelscher (5) |
| No scoring | | Second period | 11:38 - pp - Klayton Hoelscher (6) |
| Camden Daigle (4) - pp - 10:56; Ray Huether (4) - 1:09 | | Third period | 0:12 - Klayton Hoelscher (7) |
| Tyler Parr (4-1) | | Goalie stats | Mark Williams (0-1) |

| March 14 | Minto 81's | 4 – 1 | Seaforth Centenaires | Seaforth Community Centre | Recap |
| Stephen Gibson (7) - pp - 7:27; Adam Kawalec (6) - 6:32 | | First period | No scoring |
| No scoring | | Second period | No scoring |
| Chayse Herffort (3) - pp - 10:23; Eric Margo (3) - 1:02 | | Third period | 2:08 - Cohen Adair (6) |
| Jonathan Reinhart (7-1, 34 saves / 35 shots) | | Goalie stats | Tyler Parr (4-2, 30 saves / 34 shots) |

| March 15 | Seaforth Centenaires | 4 – 7 | Minto 81's | Palmerston Community Centre | Recap |
| Jamie Huber (3) - pp - 7:14 | | First period | 18:22 - Cole Pellett (2) |
| Malcolm McLeod (1) - pp - 15:21; Jared Nash (4) - pp - 10:17; Jamie Huber (4) - 6:33 | | Second period | 18:22 - Matthew Murray (1); 16:56 - sh - Klayton Hoelscher (8); 9:02 - Eric Margo (4); 2:07 - Stephen Gibson (8) |
| No scoring | | Third period | 1:21 - Caleb Warren (3); 0:24 - Chayse Herffort (4) |
| Tyler Parr (4-3) | | Goalie stats | Jonathan Reinhart (8-1) |

| Minto wins series 4 – 2 |

==== J.F. Paxton Trophy finals ====
===== (1) Ripley Wolves vs. (3) Minto 81's =====
| March 21 | Minto 81's | 4 – 2 | Ripley Wolves | Ripley-Huron Arena | Recap |
| Klayton Hoelscher (8) - pp - 0:35 | | First period | 15:37 - Garrett Meurs (6); 5:10 - Logan Swanton (1) |
| Chayse Herffort (4) - pp - 0:28 | | Second period | No scoring |
| Caleb Warren (3) - 8:59; Caleb Warren (4) - en - 0:12 | | Third period | No scoring |
| Jonathan Reinhart (9-1, 28 saves / 30 shots) | | Goalie stats | Jason Hamilton (8-2, 24 saves / 27 shots) |

| March 22 | Ripley Wolves | 4 – 6 | Minto 81's | Palmerston Community Centre | Recap |
| Dan Nicoloff (9) - 0:03 | | First period | No scoring |
| Drew Davidson (2) - 14:53; Jarred Colling (3) - 7:59; Brett Catto (5) - pp - 7:43 | | Second period | 18:46 - Adam Kawalec (7); 12:53 - Curtis Rawn (1); 10:24 - pp - Steven Grant (4) |
| No scoring | | Third period | 17:57 - pp - Stephen Gibson (8); 2:38 - Klayton Hoelscher (9); 1:32 - Adam Kawalec (8) |
| Jason Hamilton (8-3, 28 saves / 34 shots) | | Goalie stats | Jonathan Reinhart (10-1, 19 saves / 23 shots) |

| March 28 | Minto 81's | 5 – 3 | Ripley Wolves | Ripley-Huron Arena | Recap |
| Blair Butchart (6) - 10:55; Chayse Herffort (5) - 7:35; Jordan DeLaurier (1) - pp - 1:03 | | First period | No scoring |
| Chayse Herffort (6) - sh - 16:35; Camden McNevan (1) - pp - 10:24 | | Second period | 10:46 - sh - Garrett Meurs (7); 9:13 - pp - Brett Catto (6) |
| No scoring | | Third period | 2:40 - Garrett Meurs (8) |
| Jonathan Reinhart (11-1, 29 saves / 32 shots) | | Goalie stats | Jason Hamilton (8-4, 29 saves / 34 shots) |

| March 29 | Ripley Wolves | 2 – 5 | Minto 81's | Palmerston Community Centre | Recap |
| Cody Britton (7) - 13:57 | | First period | No scoring |
| Garrett Meurs (9) - pp - 8:55 | | Second period | 19:12 - Mason Kohn (1); 15:12 - Mason Kohn (2); 14:21 - Steven Grant (5) |
| No scoring | | Third period | 1:42 - en - Jordan DeLaurier (2); 1:23 - en - Trent Verbeek (1) |
| Jason Hamilton (8-5, 38 saves / 41 shots) | | Goalie stats | Jonathan Reinhart (12-1, 25 saves / 27 shots) |

| Minto wins series 4 – 0 |

==== J. F. Paxton Trophy scoring leaders ====
Note: GP = Games played; G = Goals; A = Assists; Pts = Points; PIM = Penalty minutes

| Player | Team | GP | G | A | Pts | PIM |
|---|---|---|---|---|---|---|
| Stephen Gibson | Minto 81's | 13 | 8 | 12 | 20 | 10 |
| Garrett Meurs | Ripley Wolves | 13 | 9 | 9 | 18 | 32 |
| Klayton Hoelscher | Minto 81's | 12 | 9 | 8 | 17 | 4 |
| Cody Britton | Ripley Wolves | 14 | 7 | 10 | 17 | 4 |
| Dan Nicoloff | Ripley Wolves | 12 | 9 | 6 | 15 | 19 |
| Adam Kawalec | Minto 81's | 11 | 8 | 7 | 15 | 4 |
| Blair Butchart | Minto 81's | 13 | 6 | 7 | 13 | 16 |
| Chayse Herffort | Minto 81's | 13 | 6 | 7 | 13 | 6 |
| Brett Catto | Ripley Wolves | 11 | 6 | 6 | 12 | 32 |
| Gerrit Satosek | Ripley Wolves | 11 | 3 | 9 | 12 | 29 |

==== J. F. Paxton Trophy leading goaltenders ====
Note: GP = Games played; Mins = Minutes played; W = Wins; L = Losses: OTL = Overtime losses;
SL = Shootout losses; GA = Goals Allowed; SO = Shutouts; GAA = Goals against average

| Player | Team | GP | MINS | W | L | GA | SO | GAA |
|---|---|---|---|---|---|---|---|---|
| Alex Hutcheson | Seaforth Centenaires | 3 | 183 | 2 | 1 | 8 | 0 | 2.62 |
| Jonathan Reinhart | Minto 81's | 13 | 782 | 12 | 1 | 39 | 0 | 2.99 |
| Tyler Parr | Seaforth Centenaires | 7 | 420 | 4 | 3 | 21 | 0 | 3.00 |
| Jason Hamilton | Ripley Wolves | 13 | 758 | 7 | 6 | 39 | 1 | 3.09 |
| Clayton Fritsch | Saugeen Shores Winterhawks | 11 | 666 | 6 | 5 | 37 | 0 | 3.33 |

=== Hugh McLean Trophy playoffs ===
The three Hugh McLean Trophy playoff qualifiers played in a home and home round robin with the top two teams in the round robin advancing to the best-of-seven Hugh McLean Trophy championship series.

==== Round robin ====
Note: GP = Games played; W = Wins; L= Losses GF = Goals for; GA = Goals against; Pts = Points; Green shade = Clinched championship series berth

| Hugh McLean Trophy round robin | GP | W | L | Pts | GF | GA |
|---|---|---|---|---|---|---|
| Durham Thundercats | 4 | 2 | 2 | 4 | 19 | 15 |
| Milverton Four Wheel Drives | 4 | 2 | 2 | 4 | 18 | 19 |
| Lucknow Lancers | 4 | 2 | 2 | 4 | 18 | 21 |

- Tie-breakering procedure:

1. Head-to-head record
2. Goal differential
3. Goals for %
There are no points awarded for a playoff overtime loss.

===== Round robin scores =====
====== Milverton Four Wheel Drives at Lucknow Lancers ======
| February 8 | Milverton Four Wheel Drives | 4 – 6 | Lucknow Lancers | Lucknow Arena | Recap |
| Chris Corbett (1) - 7:45 | | First period | 15:41 - Brayden Fischer (1); 7:04 - Tanner Simpson (1); 0:07 - Jamie Miller (1) |
| No scoring | | Second period | 12:51 - Curtis Jackson (1) |
| Curtis Butler (1) - 19:40; Carson Wickie (1) - 12:10; Mike Vittelli (1) - 3:13 | | Third period | 19:59 - Greg Scott (1); 15:00 - Tanner Simpson (2) |
| Frank Boal (0-1) | | Goalie stats | Liam McCarthy (1-0) |

====== Lucknow Lancers at Durham Thundercats ======
| February 14 | Lucknow Lancers | 4 – 7 | Durham Thundercats | Durham Arena | Recap |
| Curtis Jackson (2) - pp - 9:02; Travis Sloan (1) - 5:35 | | First period | 5:18 - Justin Graham (1) |
| Trent Michie (1) - pp - 16:22 | | Second period | 18:39 - Mark Aljoe (1); 16:48 - sh - Brandon Richardson (1); 3:06 - Brody Leblanc (1) |
| Travis Sloan (2) - 17:54 | | Third period | 17:43 - Brody Leblanc (2); 12:19 - Riley O'Connell (1); 2:45 - en - Aeric Annetta (1) |
| Odin Hessel (0-1, 28 saves / 34 shots) | | Goalie stats | Vance Meyer (1-0, 27 saves / 31 shots) |

====== Lucknow Lancers at Milverton Four Wheel Drives ======
| February 16 | Lucknow Lancers | 6 – 5 | Milverton Four Wheel Drives | Perth East Recreational Complex | Recap |
| Josh Gottfried (1) - 14:50; Wilder Hoggarth (1) - pp - 7:26 | | First period | 18:16 - Carson Wickie (2) |
| Jamie Miller (2) - pp - 3:23; Jamie Miller (3) - 0:32 | | Second period | 16:23 - Eric Vander Eyk (1); 13:55 - pp - Carson Wickie (3); 10:02 - pp - Carson Wickie (4); 8:35 - Mitch Boertien (1) |
| Joe Murray (1) - 13:44; Brayden Fischer (2) - 6:58 | | Third period | No scoring |
| Liam McCarthy (2-0, 30 saves / 35 shots) | | Goalie stats | Frank Boal (0-2, 31 saves / 37 shots) |

====== Durham Thundercats at Lucknow Lancers ======
| February 22 | Durham Thundercats | 5 – 2 | Lucknow Lancers | Lucknow Arena | Recap |
| Justin Graham (2) - 17:42; Justin Graham (3) - 14:30 | | First period | No scoring |
| Brody Leblanc (3) - pp - 10:44; Riley O'Connell (2) - pp - 9:29 | | Second period | 17:35 - pp - Trent Michie (2); 4:55 - pp - Curtis Jackson (3) |
| Kyler Nixon (1) - 1:35 | | Third period | No scoring |
| Brendon Landry (1-0, 40 saves / 42 shots) | | Goalie stats | Odin Hessel (0-2, 45 saves / 50 shots) |

====== Durham Thundercats at Milverton Four Wheel Drives ======
| February 23 | Durham Thundercats | 4 – 5 | Milverton Four Wheel Drives | Perth East Recreational Complex | Recap |
| Justin Graham (4) - 16:46; Riley O'Connell (3) - 15:27 | | First period | 12:48 - Mike Vittelli (2) |
| Kyler Nixon (2) - 18:06; Cody Brown (1) - 14:03 | | Second period | 1:10 - pp - Carson Wickie (5) |
| Kyler Nixon (1) - 1:35 | | Third period | 14:50 - Brendan Schneider (1); 12:04 - Mitch Boertien (2); 1:11 - pp - Chad Swartzentruber (1) |
| Nolan Brown (0-1, 36 saves / 41 shots) | | Goalie stats | Josh Roman (1-0, 38 saves / 42 shots) |

====== Milverton Four Wheel Drives at Durham Thundercats ======
| February 28 | Milverton Four Wheel Drives | 4 – 3 | OT | Durham Thundercats | Durham Arena | Recap |
| Reese Stanley (1) - 13:49; Curtis Butler (2) - pp - 9:35 | | First period | | 19:12 - Cody Brown (2); 14:09 - Brody Leblanc (4) |
| Dennis Dewar (1) - 9:29 | | Second period | | 3:18 - Brody Leblanc (5) |
| No scoring | | Third period | | No scoring |
| Mitch Boertien (3) - 15:39 | | First overtime period | | No scoring |
| Josh Roman (2-0, 43 saves / 46 shots) | | Goalie stats | | Brendon Landry (1-1, 29 saves / 33 shots) |

==== Hugh McLean Trophy finals ====
===== (1) Durham Thundercats vs. (2) Milverton Four Wheel Drives =====
| March 8 | Milverton Four Wheel Drives | 4 – 5 | Durham Thundercats | Durham Arena | Recap |
| Curtis Butler (3) - 17:25 | | First period | 7:46 - Riley O'Connell (4); 5:44 - Luke Richardson (1) |
| Curtis Butler (4) - 18:52; Liam Buckley (1) - 5:31 | | Second period | 15:59 - Connor Prins (1) |
| Riley Connors (1) - pp - 1:15 | | Third period | 11:23 - Kyler Nixon (3); 0:21 - sh - Connor Prins (2) |
| Josh Roman (2-1, 36 saves / 41 shots) | | Goalie stats | Vance Meyer (2-0, 31 saves / 35 shots) |

| March 9 | Durham Thundercats | 5 – 4 | OT | Milverton Four Wheel Drives | Perth East Recreational Complex | Recap |
| Riley O'Connell (5) - pp - 1:24 | | First period | | No scoring |
| Riley O'Connell (6) - pp - 12:12; Corey Allen (1) - 5:01; Brody Leblanc (6) - 3:58 | | Second period | | 14:50 - pp - Riley Connors (2); 11:23 - Mitch Boertien (4); 8:51 - sh - Riley Connors (3); 6:01 - Riley Connors (4) |
| No scoring | | Third period | | No scoring |
| Brody Leblanc (7) - pp 18:41 | | First overtime period | | No scoring |
| Brendon Landry (2-1, 38 saves / 42 shots) | | Goalie stats | | Josh Roman (2-2, 29 saves / 34 shots) |

| March 14 | Milverton Four Wheel Drives | 5 – 13 | Durham Thundercats | Durham Arena | Recap |
| Reese Stanley (2) - 13:53; Mike Vittelli (3) - 11:21; Mike Vittelli (4) - 2:31 | | First period | 18:23 - Brady Becker (1); 13:18 - Aeric Annetta (2); 12:05 - Jarrett Woon Sam (1); 9:25 - Luke Richardson (2); 6:28 - pp - Brody Leblanc (8); 1:31 - Cody Brown (3) |
| Dennis Dewar (2) - 7:00 | | Second period | 9:11 - Brody Leblanc (9); 7:10 - Kyler Nixon (4) |
| Riley Kuepfer (1) - 7:56 | | Third period | 18:57 - sh - Trevor Hughson (1); 17:15 - Brody Leblanc (10); 13:51 - pp - Luke Richardson (3); 11:34 - Owen Rahn (1); 10:28 - Brody Leblanc (11) |
| Josh Roman (2-3, 18 saves / 31 shots) | | Goalie stats | Brendon Landry (3-1, 43 saves / 48 shots) |

| March 16 | Durham Thundercats | 6 – 7 | OT | Milverton Four Wheel Drives | Perth East Recreational Complex | Recap |
| Justin Graham (5) - 16:49; Brody Leblanc (12) - 2:03; Jackson Seeley (1) - 0:09 | | First period | | 8:08 - Colton Quipp (1); 4:39 - Mitch Boertien (5) |
| No scoring | | Second period | | 15:07 - Colton Quipp (2); 11:52 - Riley Connors (5); 6:59 - pp - Liam Buckley (2) |
| Brady Becker (2) - 14:43; Justin Graham (6) - pp - 2:13; Kyler Nixon (5) - 1:05 | | Third period | | 5:50 - pp - Mitch Boertien (6) |
| No scoring | | First overtime period | | 17:33 - Liam Buckley (3) |
| Brendon Landry (3-2, 27 saves / 34 shots) | | Goalie stats | | Josh Roman (3-3, 29 saves / 35 shots) |

| March 21 | Milverton Four Wheel Drives | 3 – 4 | OT | Durham Thundercats | Durham Arena | Recap |
| No scoring | | First period | | No scoring |
| Dennis Dewar (3) - 16:09 | | Second period | | 5:31 - pp - Luke Richardson (4) |
| Dennis Dewar (4) - pp - 15:01; Carson Wickie (6) - pp - 3:46 | | Third period | | 15:50 - sh - Brody Leblanc (13); 12:01 - pp - Kyler Nixon (6) |
| No scoring | | First overtime period | | 12:20 - Brody Leblanc (14) |
| Josh Roman (3-4, 40 saves / 44 shots) | | Goalie stats | | Vance Meyer (3-0, 47 saves / 50 shots) |

| Durham wins series 4 – 1 |

==== Hugh McLean Trophy scoring leaders ====
Note: GP = Games played; G = Goals; A = Assists; Pts = Points; PIM = Penalty minutes

| Player | Team | GP | G | A | Pts | PIM |
|---|---|---|---|---|---|---|
| Brody Leblanc | Durham Thundercats | 9 | 14 | 8 | 22 | 6 |
| Kyler Nixon | Durham Thundercats | 8 | 6 | 14 | 20 | 6 |
| Riley O'Connell | Durham Thundercats | 9 | 6 | 11 | 17 | 2 |
| Luke Richardson | Durham Thundercats | 8 | 4 | 12 | 16 | 2 |
| Justin Graham | Durham Thundercats | 9 | 6 | 7 | 13 | 6 |
| Carson Wickie | Milverton Four Wheel Drives | 9 | 6 | 6 | 12 | 0 |
| Cody Brown | Durham Thundercats | 5 | 3 | 7 | 10 | 4 |
| Mitch Boertien | Milverton Four Wheel Drives | 7 | 6 | 3 | 9 | 19 |
| Riley Connors | Milverton Four Wheel Drives | 8 | 5 | 4 | 9 | 0 |
| Curtis Butler | Milverton Four Wheel Drives | 7 | 4 | 5 | 9 | 6 |

==== Hugh McLean Trophy leading goaltenders ====
Note: GP = Games played; Mins = Minutes played; W = Wins; L = Losses: OTL = Overtime losses;
SL = Shootout losses; GA = Goals Allowed; SO = Shutouts; GAA = Goals against average

| Player | Team | GP | MINS | W | L | GA | SO | GAA |
|---|---|---|---|---|---|---|---|---|
| Vance Meyer | Durham Thundercats | 3 | 187 | 3 | 0 | 11 | 0 | 3.53 |
| Brendon Landry | Durham Thundercats | 5 | 308 | 3 | 2 | 22 | 0 | 4.29 |
| Josh Roman | Milverton Four Wheel Drives | 7 | 376 | 3 | 4 | 27 | 1 | 4.31 |
