= Tavistock Royals =

- City: Tavistock, Ontario
- League: Ontario Elite Hockey League
- Division: South
- Founded: 1982
- Home arena: Tavistock & District Recreation Centre
- General manager: Brad Stere; Derek Wagler
- Head coach: Tyson Zehr
- Website: http://www.tavistockroyals.com

The Tavistock Royals are a senior hockey team based out of Tavistock, Ontario, Canada. They play in the Ontario Elite Hockey League of the Ontario Hockey Association and Hockey Canada.

== Championships ==
The Tavistock Royals have won three WOAA "AA" Championships, as they were champions in 1994-95, 2007-08, and in 2022-23.

== 2006–07 Royals season ==
Tavistock had another very strong season, finishing with an 18-6-0 record, which placed them in third place in the South Division, and a playoff matchup with the Shelburne Muskies in the "AA" quarter-finals.

The Royals would start off quick and win the first two games, however Shelburne came back and won three in a row to put Tavistock on the brink of elimination. The Royals would come back and win the final two games of the series to win it 4-3.

Tavistock would then face the South Division winning Clinton Radars in the "AA" semi-finals, and would drop the first game 6-4 to go down 1-0 in the series. The Royals would rebound, and win the next two in overtime. Game four would be another close one, as the Royals held off the Radars 3-2 to take a 3-1 series lead. Tavistock would then eliminate Clinton in game five with a 5-4 victory, and advance to the "AA" finals.

The Royals would play the Elora Rocks in the finals to determine the "AA" championship, and after the first four games, the series was tied two games each as both teams would win their games on the road. The Royals won game five on home ice, with the chance to win the title in Elora in game six. Tavistock would fall short in the sixth game, losing 5-3 in a well played game, setting up the seventh and deciding game in Tavistock. The Royals got off to a fast start, scoring 97 seconds into the game, but the Rocks would prove to be too much to handle, as the Royals lost 7-3, ending their season one victory shy of the championship.

== 2007–08 Royals season ==
After a successful 2006-07 season, in which the Royals were within one victory of the WOAA "AA" championship, Tavistock would have its best regular season in team history, finishing on top of the South Division with a 23-2-1 record, earning 47 points and a spot in the "AA" playoffs.

Tavistock's "AA" quarter-final opponent was the Shelburne Muskies, the same opponent from the "AA" quarter-finals from the previous season, in which the Royals were victorious. The Muskies surprised the heavily favoured Royals in the series opener in Tavistock, defeating the Royals 6-5. Tavistock evened the series up in the second game held in Shelburne with a convincing 6-1 victory. The Royals continued their winning ways in the third game, doubling Shelburne 4-2 to take a 2-1 series lead, then won a wild 4th game 7-6 in OT to lead the series 3-1. The Royals closed out the series in the fifth game, defeating Shelburne 6-4.

Tavistock would then face the Clinton Radars in the "AA" semi-finals, and would take a 1-0 series lead with a solid 8-5 victory in the series opener. Tavistock would easily win the second game by an 8-1 score, before winning the third game by a close 5-3 score to take a 3-0 lead in the series. The Royals and Radars would play into overtime in the fourth game, with Tavistock scoring in the extra period to win the game, sweep the series, and advance to the "AA" finals.

The Royals would face the Elora Rocks in a rematch of the 2007 "AA" finals, which saw the Rocks win the championship in seven games. Elora opened the series with a 5-2 victory, however, the Royals rebounded and held on for a 5-4 win in the second game to tie the series up. Tavistock would win by a 5-4 again in the third game to take a 2-1 series lead, then win another one-goal game in the fourth game, defeating Elora 4-3, to take a commanding 3-1 series lead. Tavistock would have no problems wrapping the series up in the fifth game, dominating the Rocks, as they easily won the game 6-1, and winning the "AA" championship for the second time in club history.

== 2008–09 Royals season ==
It would be another successful regular season for the defending "AA" champions, as Tavistock would battle for first place all season with the Petrolia Squires and Lucan-Ilderton Jets. The Royals finished the year with a 13-4-3 record, earning 29 points, and third place in the WOAA South Division.

Tavistock opened the post-season against the Exeter Mohawks, with the winner advancing to the "AA" playoffs. The Royals took the series opener by a 3-1 score, however, Exeter evened the series with a 3-2 overtime win in the second game. Tavistock rebounded in the third game, easily winning by a 5-2 score, before shutting out the Mohawks 7-0 to go up 3-1 in the series. In the fifth game, Exeter and Tavistock fought to a score of 5-5 after three periods, before the Royals scored in the extra period to win the game 6-5, and win the series.

The Royals opponent in the "AA" quarter-finals were the Clinton Radars. Tavistock won the first game by a score of 5-4 and took the second game with a 6-5 overtime win. Clinton responded with a 6-2 win and a 4-3 overtime win. Tavistock won game five by a score of 5-2. Clinton kept the series alive by winning game six 5-4 in overtime. Game seven was also decided in overtime with a 5-4 win for Tavistock.

In the "AA" semi-finals, Tavistock met the Petrolia Squires in a high scoring 7 game series. Petrolia opened the series with a 7-5 win. Tavistock evened the series with a 5-2 win at home. Petrolia responded with their own 5-2 win in game three. Game four was won by Tavistock 8-4 tying the series at two games apiece. Petrolia took a series lead by winning game five 5-2. Tavistock forced a seventh game with a 7-3 win in game six. Tavistock went on to take the series with convincing 9-1 game seven win.

Tavistock's opponent for the "AA" finals were the Saugeen Shores Winterhawks. Saugeen Shores won the first three games with scores of 4-3, 6-2 and 5-4. Down three games to none Tavistock kept the series alive with a game four 6-5 overtime win. The Winterhawks completed the series with a game five 6-4 win.

== 2009–10 Royals season ==
Tavistock struggled throughout the regular season, finishing the year in sixth place in the South Division with a record of 8-11-1, earning 17 points. It was the first time since 2003-04 that the Royals had a losing record.

In the best of five qualifying round, Tavistock faced off against the Monkton Wildcats. The Wildcats took the series opener by a 6-3 score, and while the second game was close, it was Monkton who prevailed with a 5-4 win to take a 2-0 series lead. In the third game, the Wildcats completed the series sweep, defeating the Royals 3-1 to send Tavistock to the "A" playoffs.

In the "A" quarter-finals, the Royals played against the Milverton Four Wheel Drives. Tavistock hung on for a 6-5 win the first game, however, Milverton tied the series up in the second game, defeating the Royals 7-2. In the third game, Tavistock once again hung on for a close victory, defeating the Drives 3-2, however, once again, Milverton tied the series up, defeating Tavistock 7-4 in the fourth game. The fifth game was another close victory by the Royals, defeating the Four Wheel Drives 6-5 to take a 3-2 series lead. Milverton fought off elimination with a convincing 5-1 win in the sixth game, setting up a seventh game. In the last game of the series, the Drives were able to hold off the Royals in a wild 8-6 win, eliminating Tavistock from the playoffs.

== 2010–11 Royals season ==
After a tough season in 2009-10, the Royals rebounded, finishing with a 20-3-3 record, earning 43 points, finishing in first place in the WOAA South Division for the first time since 2007-08.

== Season-by-season record ==
Note: GP = Games played, W = Wins, L = Losses, T= Tie, OTL = Overtime Losses, Pts = Points, GF = Goals for, GA = Goals against

| Season | GP | W | L | T | OTL | GF | GA | PTS | Finish | Playoffs |
|---|---|---|---|---|---|---|---|---|---|---|
| 1984-85 | 24 | 5 | 18 | 1 | - | -- | -- | 11 | 6th CICHL | |
| 1985-86 | 28 | 12 | 13 | 3 | - | 164 | 184 | 27 | 5th CICHL | |
| 1986-87 | 30 | 20 | 8 | 2 | - | 225 | 139 | 42 | 2nd CSBHL | |
| 1987-88 | 24 | 5 | 19 | 0 | - | 113 | 167 | 10 | 6th CSBHL | Lost quarter-final |
| 1988-89 | 23 | 5 | 13 | 5 | - | 92 | 133 | 15 | 7th CSBHL | Lost quarter-final |
| 1989-90 | 21 | 12 | 6 | 3 | - | 134 | 96 | 27 | 3rd WOAA South | Won in "A" quarter-finals (3-0 vs. Merchants); Lost in "A" semi-finals (2-3 vs. Crusaders) |
| 1990–91 | 23 | 15 | 4 | 4 | - | 136 | 88 | 34 | 2nd WOAA South | Won in "A" quarter-finals (3-2 vs. Merchants); Won in "A" semi-finals (3-0 vs. Kings); Lost in "A" finals (1-3 vs. Thundercats) |
| 1991–92 | 26 | 23 | 2 | 1 | - | 207 | 93 | 47 | 1st WOAA Sr. "A" | Won in "A" quarter-finals (3-2 vs. Redmen); Won in "A" semi-finals (3-0 vs. Comets); Lost in "A" finals (0-4 vs. Thundercats) |
| 1992–93 | 24 | 14 | 5 | 5 | - | 138 | 81 | 33 | 2nd WOAA Sr. "A" | Won in "A" quarter-finals (3-0 vs. Redmen); Won in "A" semi-finals (4-1 vs. Drives); Lost in "A" finals (2-4 vs. Thundercats) |
| 1993–94 | 20 | 15 | 4 | 1 | - | 138 | 79 | 31 | 1st WOAA Sr. "A" | Won in "A" quarter-finals (4-3 vs. 81's); Lost in "A" semi-finals (0-4 vs. Winterhawks) |
| 1994–95 | 24 | 20 | 4 | 0 | 0 | 171 | 93 | 40 | 2nd WOAA Sr. "A" | Won in "AA" quarter-finals (4-0 vs. Muskies); Won in "AA" semi-finals (4-2 vs. Rocks); Won in "AA" finals (4-2 vs. Thundercats) |
| 1995–96 | 22 | 13 | 8 | 0 | 1 | 126 | 96 | 27 | 3rd WOAA Sr. "AA" | Won in "AA" quarter-finals (4-0 vs. Drives); Lost in "AA" semi-finals (2-4 vs. Thundercats) |
| 1996–97 | 24 | 14 | 9 | 0 | 1 | 123 | 107 | 29 | 3rd WOAA Sr. "AA" | Lost in "AA" semi-finals (1-4 vs. Thundercats) |
| 1997–98 | 26 | 15 | 9 | 2 | 0 | 146 | 94 | 32 | 3rd WOAA Sr. "AA" | Lost in "AA" semi-finals (1-4 vs. Drives) |
| 1998–99 | Did Not Participate | | | | | | | | | |
| 1999–2000 | 24 | 0 | 24 | 0 | 0 | 55 | 222 | 0 | 7th WOAA South | Lost in "A" qualifying round (1-3 vs. Pirates & Wildcats) |
| 2000–01 | 24 | 6 | 14 | 3 | 1 | 88 | 114 | 16 | 6th WOAA South | Won in "A" divisional round-robin (3-1 vs. Pirates & Wildcats); Lost in "A" divisional finals (1-4 vs. Pirates) |
| 2001–02 | 24 | 7 | 16 | 1 | 0 | 100 | 140 | 15 | 6th WOAA South | Won in "A" divisional round-robin (3-1 vs. Pirates & Wildcats); Lost in "A" divisional finals (2-4 vs. Pirates) |
| 2002–03 | 24 | 15 | 7 | 1 | 1 | 151 | 100 | 32 | 6th WOAA | Lost in "AA" quarter-finals (2-4 vs. 81's); Won in "AA" tier-II semi-finals (3-0 vs. Drives); Lost in "AA" tier-II finals (0-3 vs. Muskies) |
| 2003–04 | 24 | 8 | 15 | 1 | 0 | 135 | 144 | 17 | 13th WOAA | Lost in "AA" qualifying (0-3 vs. Rocks); Won in "A" quarter-finals (4-3 vs. Jets); Lost in "A" semi-finals (1-4 vs. Wildcats) |
| 2004–05 | 25 | 18 | 6 | 1 | 0 | 164 | 87 | 37 | 2nd WOAA | Won in "AA" qualifying round (3-1 vs. Spitfires); Won in "AA" quarter-finals (4-0 vs. Drives); Lost in "AA" semi-finals (2-4 vs. Radars) |
| 2005–06 | 25 | 18 | 6 | - | 1 | 150 | 84 | 37 | 5th WOAA | Won in "AA" qualifying round (3-0 vs. Pirates); Lost in "AA" quarter-finals (3-4 vs. Lancers) |
| 2006–07 | 24 | 18 | 6 | - | 0 | 168 | 84 | 36 | 3rd WOAA South | Won in "AA" quarter-finals (4-3 vs. Muskies); Won in "AA" semi-finals (4-1 vs. Radars); Lost in "AA" finals (3-4 vs. Rocks) |
| 2007–08 | 26 | 23 | 2 | - | 1 | 160 | 72 | 47 | 1st WOAA South | Won in "AA" quarter-finals (4-1 vs. Muskies); Won in "AA" semi-finals (4-0 vs. Radars); Won in "AA" finals (4-1 vs. Rocks) |
| 2008–09 | 20 | 13 | 4 | - | 3 | 127 | 76 | 29 | 3rd WOAA South | Won in "AA" qualifying round (4-1 vs. Mohawks); Won in "AA" quarter-finals (4-3 vs. Radars); Won in "AA" semi-finals (4-3 vs. Squires); Lost in "AA" finals (1-4 vs. Winterhawks) |
| 2009–10 | 20 | 8 | 11 | - | 1 | 108 | 98 | 17 | 6th WOAA South | Lost in "AA" qualifying round (0-3 vs. Wildcats); Lost in "A" quarter-finals (3-4 vs. Drives) |
| 2010–11 | 26 | 20 | 3 | - | 3 | 161 | 85 | 43 | 1st WOAA South | Won in divisional quarter-finals (4-0 vs. Pirates); Lost in divisional semi-finals (1-4 vs. Thunder) |
| 2011–12 | 24 | 20 | 3 | - | 1 | 134 | 74 | 41 | 1st WOAA South | Won in divisional quarter-finals (4-0 vs. Pirates); Won in divisional semi-finals (4-1 vs. Squires); Won in divisional finals (4-1 vs. Thunder); Lost in "AA" finals (0-4 vs. Winterhawks) |
| 2012–13 | 24 | 15 | 5 | - | 4 | 134 | 74 | 34 | 3rd WOAA South | Won in divisional quarter-finals (4-1 vs. Drives); Won in divisional semi-finals (4-1 vs. Squires); Won in divisional finals (4-2 vs. Classics); Lost in "AA" finals (2-4 vs. Winterhawks) |
| 2013–14 | 24 | 16 | 6 | - | 2 | 144 | 78 | 34 | 2nd WOAA South | Won in divisional quarter-finals (4-1 vs. Drives); Lost in divisional semi-finals (1-4 vs. Classics) |
| 2014–15 | 24 | 17 | 5 | - | 2 | 151 | 96 | 36 | 2nd WOAA South | Won in divisional semi-finals (4-2 vs. Squires); Lost in divisional finals (2-4 vs. Thunder) |
| 2015–16 | 24 | 13 | 8 | - | 3 | 120 | 115 | 29 | 2nd WOAA South | Lost in divisional semi-finals (3-4 vs. Squires) |
| 2016–17 | 20 | 11 | 7 | - | 2 | 115 | 98 | 24 | 5th WOAA | Lost in "AA" quarter-finals (2-4 vs. Radars) |
| 2017–18 | 20 | 7 | 13 | - | 0 | 78 | 109 | 14 | 10th WOAA | Won in "A" semi-finals (4-1 vs. Crushers); Lost in "A" finals (1-4 vs. Squires) |
| 2018–19 | 22 | 12 | 9 | - | 1 | 99 | 89 | 25 | 8th WOAA | Lost in "AA" quarter-finals (0-4 vs. Radars) |
| 2019–20 | 22 | 9 | 11 | - | 2 | 102 | 108 | 20 | 9th WOAA | Won in "A" semi-finals (4-0 vs. Lancers) "A" finals cancelled due to COVID-19 |
| 2020–21 | Season cancelled due to COVID-19 | | | | | | | | | |
| 2021–22 | 13 | 8 | 4 | - | 1 | 72 | 51 | 17 | 5th WOAA | Won in "AA" quarter-finals (4-2 vs. Winterhawks); Lost in "AA" semi-finals (1-4 vs. Centenaires) |
| 2022–23 | 20 | 13 | 5 | - | 2 | 97 | 75 | 28 | 5th WOAA | Won in "AA" quarter-finals (4-2 vs. 81's); Won in "AA" semi-finals (4-2 vs. Centenaires); Won in "AA" finals (4-1 vs. Wolves) |
| 2023–24 | 20 | 13 | 7 | - | 0 | 87 | 69 | 26 | 4th OEHL | Won in OEHL quarter-finals (4-1 vs. Thundercats); Won in OEHL semi-finals (4-2 vs. Wolves); Lost in OEHL finals (0-4 vs. 81's) |
| 2024–25 | 20 | 13 | 7 | - | 0 | 93 | 65 | 26 | 4th OEHL | Lost in Paxton Trophy quarter-finals (1-4 vs. Winterhawks) |
| 2025–26 | 20 | 12 | 7 | - | 1 | 100 | 76 | 25 | 5th OEHL South | Won in divisional quarter-finals (4-0 vs. Outlaws); Lost in divisional semi-finals (3-4 vs. Centenaires) |

== Related links ==
- Tavistock, Ontario
- Ontario Elite Hockey League
