= Minto 81's =

- City: Palmerston, Ontario; Harriston, Ontario
- League: Ontario Elite Hockey League
- Division: North
- Home arena: Palmerston & District Community Centre, Harriston Arena
- Colours: Blue, Red, and White
- General manager: Rick Fisk
- Head coach: Ryan Fisk

Franchise history
- 1981-2011: Palmerston 81's
- 2011-2019: Mapleton-Minto 81's
- 2019-present: Minto 81's

Previous franchise history
- merged in 2011: Drayton Icemen

The Minto 81's are a senior hockey team based out of Palmerston and Harriston, Ontario, Canada. They play in the Ontario Elite Hockey League of the Ontario Hockey Association and Hockey Canada.

== Championships ==
Palmerston won the WOAA Grand Championship in the 1957–58 season. The current Palmerston 81's have three WOAA Sr. "A" Championships, in 1998–99, 2005–06, and 2007–08, they have a WOAA Sr. "AA" Championship, in 2002–03, and two OEHL Sr. "AA" Championships, which were in 2023-2024 and 2024-2025.

=== 2006–07 season ===
Palmerston, the defending Senior "A" Champions, ended the year, with a 17–7–0 record, good for fourth in the North Division.

The 81's would face the South Division champions, the Clinton Radars in the "AA" quarter-finals. After falling behind by losing the first game of the series, Palmerston would win two in a row in overtime to take a 2–1 series lead. Clinton would come back and win two in a row to put Palmerston behind 3–2, however in the sixth game, the 81's staved off elimination with a convincing 5–2 victory, forcing a seventh game in Clinton. The 81's would fall behind the Radars 3–0 after the first period and could never recover, losing 6–2 and being eliminated from the playoffs.

=== 2007–08 season ===
After starting the season off with a 7–2–1 record in their first 10 games, the 81's would slump, losing six of their next eight games, to sit with a 9–8–1 record, and push the team out of the "AA" playoff picture. Palmerston snapped out of their slump, and in their remaining eight games, they posted an impressive 7–0–1 record, and finish in fifth place in the North Division, and qualifying for the "A" playoffs.

The 81's opening opponent in the quarter-finals was the Monkton Wildcats, and Monkton surprised Palmerston with a 4–3 OT victory in the series opener, followed by a 2–1 win in the second game to take a 2–0 series lead. The 81's fought back, winning games three and four to tie the series, but the Wildcats put Palmerston on the brink of elimination with a 4–0 victory in the fifth game to take a 3–2 series lead. The 81's would once again fight back, hanging on for a 4–3 win in the sixth game, sending the series to a seventh and deciding game. Palmerston would complete the comeback, defeating Monkton 5–4, and advance to the "A" semi-finals.

Palmerston would face the defending "A" champions, the Durham Thundercats in the semi-finals, and the 81's would win a very wild opening game by a score of 9–7. Durham rebounded to tie the series up in the second game, however, Palmerston would dominate the Thundercats in the third game, winning 10–5, and taking a 2–1 series lead. Palmerston's offense stayed hot, defeating Durham 7–3 in the fourth game, and then defeating the Thundercats in the fifth game by a 7–4 score to win the series, advancing to the "A" finals.

The 81's next opponent would be the Lucknow Lancers, and after dropping the series opener by a 5–4 score, Palmerston would win the next two games by scores of 6–4 and 7–1 to take a 2–1 series lead. Lucknow evened the series with a 7–5 victory in the fourth game, however, Palmerston once again took the series lead with a solid 7–3 win in the fifth game. The 81's would hang on for a 3–2 win in the sixth game, winning the "A" championship for the second time in three seasons.

=== 2008–09 season ===
Palmerston would get off to a hot start to begin the regular season, winning their first seven games. The 81's would continue to play good hockey throughout the regular season, finishing off with a 14–4–2 record, earning 30 points, and fourth in the WOAA North Division.

Palmerston opened the playoffs against the Durham Thundercats, with the winner advancing to the "AA" quarter-finals. The 81's opened the series with a 9–2 victory, followed by a 6–2 win the second game to take a 2–0 series lead. The third game would be determined in overtime, as the scored was tied 4–4 after three periods of play, and it would be Palmerston earning the victory to take the 3–0 series lead. The fourth game would once again be tied 4–4 after regulation time, and the 81's would earn the series sweep, by scoring in the extra period and advance to the "AA" quarter-finals.

In the "AA" quarter-finals, the 81's faced off against the Saugeen Shores Winterhawks, where Saugeen Shores would take an early series lead by defeating Palmerston 5–3 in the series opener, followed by a 7–6 Winterhawks victory in the second game. Saugeen Shores would continue their winning ways in the third game, defeating the 81's 6–4 to take a 3–0 series lead. Palmerston would fight off elimination in the fourth game, defeating the Winterhawks 8–5, however, Saugeen Shores would end the 81's season in the fifth game with a 4–2 victory over Palmerston.

=== 2009–10 season ===
Palmerston would struggle during the 2009–10 season, as they finished with a record of 8–9–3, earning 19 points, and a seventh-place finish in the North Division standings.

In the playoffs, the 81's faced off against the Shelburne Muskies in a best of five qualifying round. The Muskies easily defeated the 81's by a 6–3 score in the series opener, followed by a 5–2 Shelburne win in the second game. Palmerston kept the third game close, however, Shelburne completed the three-game sweep with a 4–3 win, sending Palmerston to the "A" playoffs.

In the "A" quarter-finals, the 81's would face the Lucknow Lancers. Lucknow took the first game, winning a wild one by a score of 8–6. The Lancers then took the second game by a 7–3 score, followed by a 7–4 Lucknow win in the third game as the Lancers took a 3–0 series lead. Lucknow completed the sweep in the fourth game, blowing out Palmerston 9–3 to end the 81's season.

=== 2010–11 season ===
After a very disappointing 2009–10 season, the 81's improved a little bit during the season, as the club went 13–12–1 to finish above the .500 mark, earning 27 points, and finishing in fifth place in the North Division standings. In the summer of 2011, the team announced they were merging with the Drayton Icemen and expanding their territory with it. They are now called the Mapleton-Minto 81's.

=== 2011–12 season ===
The 81's were able to maintain their 5th place spot in the North Division following the merger with Drayton, finishing the 24-game schedule with a record of 11–10–3.

They faced off against the Durham Thundercats in a North Division quarterfinal series, falling in 5 games.

=== 2012–13 season ===
The 81's started off their season with promise, defeating the defending champion Saugeen Shores Winterhawks in the Winterhawks home opener. The 81's were unable to sustain the success, and struggled to a record of 7–15–2. They finished 7th in the North Division, ahead of only the last-place Lucknow Lancers.

After falling to the 2nd-seed Winterhawks in the first round of the "AA" playoffs, the 81's withdrew from the "A" championship playoffs.

=== 2013–14 season ===
After a strong regular season, the 81's reached their first league final since 2002 by sweeping the Elora Rocks in four games in the North Division final.

== Season-by-season record ==
Note: GP = Games played, W = Wins, L = Losses, T= Tie, OTL = Overtime Losses, Pts = Points, GF = Goals for, GA = Goals against

Season	GP	W	L	T	OTL	GF	GA	PTS	Finish	Playoffs
1990–91	24	18	2	4	-	168	98	40	1st in South	Lost in "A" quarter-finals (2-3 vs. Four Wheel Drives)
1991–92	26	8	14	4	-	130	161	20	7th in WOAA	Lost in "A" quarter-finals (0-3 vs. Thundercats)
1992–93	24	4	14	6	-	110	134	14	8th in WOAA	Lost in "A" quarter-finals (0-3 vs. Thundercats)
1993–94	20	7	10	3	-	82	90	17	9th in WOAA	Lost in "A" quarter-finals (3-4 vs. Royals)
1994–95	24	0	20	1	3	65	205	4	12th in WOAA	Won in preliminary round (2-1 vs. Radar); Lost in "A" semi-finals (1-4 vs. Tigers)
1995–96	24	9	14	1	-	104	105	19	5th in Sr. "A"	Lost in "A" quarter-finals (0-4 vs. Radar)
1996–97	24	13	10	1	-	146	124	27	4th in Sr. "A"	Lost in "A" quarter-finals (2-4 vs. Wolves)
1997–98	24	10	11	3	-	104	107	23	3rd in Sr. "A" East	Lost in "A" quarter-finals (2-4 vs. Redmen)
1998–99	24	17	5	0	2	118	70	36	1st in Sr. "A" East	Won in "A" quarter-finals (4-1 vs. Tigers); Won in "A" semi-finals (4-3 vs. Muskies); Won in "A" finals (4-2 vs. Radars)
1999–2000	24	19	4	0	1	163	87	39	1st in North	Won in "AA" quarter-finals (4-2 vs. Muskies); Won in "AA" semi-finals (4-3 vs. Thundercats); Lost in "AA" finals (0-4 vs. Four Wheel Drives)
2000–01	24	19	5	0	0	102	62	38	2nd in North	Lost in "AA" quarter-finals (2-4 vs. Merchants)
2001–02	24	18	4	2	0	113	88	38	2nd in North	Won in "AA" quarter-finals (4-0 vs. Muskies); Lost in "AA" semi-finals (0-4 vs. Four Wheel Drives)
2002–03	25	17	6	0	1	112	80	35	3rd in WOAA	Won in "AA" quarter-finals (4-2 vs. Royals); Won in "AA" semi-finals (4-3 vs. Radars); Won in "AA" finals (4-3 vs. Sherwoods)
2003–04	24	13	11	0	0	104	87	26	8th in WOAA	Won in qualifying round (3-0 vs. Wildcats); Lost in "AA" quarter-finals (3-4 vs. Radars)
2004–05	25	17	6	1	1	133	77	36	6th in WOAA	Won in qualifying round (3-0 vs. Jets); Won in "AA" quarter-finals (4-0 vs. Muskies); Lost in "AA" semi-finals (1-4 vs. Rocks)
2005–06	25	15	8	-	2	114	79	32	9th in WOAA	Lost in qualifying round (1-3 vs. Radars); Won in "A" quarter-finals (4-3 vs. Jets); Won in "A" quarter-finals (4-0 vs. Pirates); Won in "A" finals (4-0 vs. Wildcats)
2006–07	24	17	7	-	0	159	82	34	4th in North	Lost in "AA" quarter-finals (3-4 vs. Radars)
2007–08	26	16	8	-	2	122	92	34	5th in North	Won in "A" quarter-finals (4-3 vs. Wildcats); Won in "A" semi-finals (4-1 vs. Thundercats); Won in "A" finals (4-2 vs. Lancers)
2008–09	20	14	4	-	2	139	88	30	4th in North	Won in qualifying round (4-0 vs. Thundercats); Lost in "AA" quarter-finals (1-4 vs. Winterhawks)
2009–10	20	8	9	-	3	101	117	19	7th in North	Lost in qualifying round (0-3 vs. Muskies); Lost in "A" quarter-finals (0-4 vs. Lancers)
2010–11	26	13	12	-	1	113	106	27	5th in North	Lost North Division quarter-finals (2-4 vs. Lancers)
2011–12	24	11	10	-	3	96	111	25	5th in North	Lost North Division quarter-finals (1-4 vs. Thundercats)
2012–13	24	7	15	-	2	82	132	16	7th in North	Lost North Division quarter-finals (0-4 vs. Winterhawks)
2013–14	24	20	4	-	0	145	70	40	1st in North	Won North Division semi-finals (4-0 vs. Lancers); Won North Division finals (4-1 vs. Thundercats); Lost "AA" finals (2-4 vs. Classics)
2014–15	24	17	7	-	0	108	61	34	3rd in North	Won North Division semi-finals (4-2 vs. Winterhawks); Won North Division finals (4-0 vs. Rocks); Lost "AA" finals (1-4 vs. Thunder)
2015–16	24	22	2	-	0	135	51	44	1st in North	Won North Division semi-finals (4-0 vs. Crushers); Won North Division finals (4-1 vs. Winterhawks); Lost "AA" finals (0-4 vs. Radars)
2016–17	20	16	4	-	0	102	59	32	2nd in WOAA	Won "AA" quarter-finals (4-3 vs. Thunder); Lost "AA" semi-finals (2-4 vs. Squires)
2018–19	22	12	7	-	3	109	91	27	5th in WOAA	Lost "AA" quarter-finals (1-4 vs. Winterhawks)
2019–20	22	13	8	-	1	98	87	27	7th in WOAA	Won "AA" quarter-finals (4-2 vs. Muskies); Tied "AA" semi-finals (2-2 vs. Wolves); Playoffs cancelled due to COVID-19 pandemic
2021–22	12	8	4	-	0	48	31	16	3rd in WOAA	Lost "AA" quarter-finals (3-4 vs. Radars)
2022–23	20	14	5	-	1	85	54	29	4th in WOAA	Lost "AA" quarter-finals (2-4 vs. Royals)
2023–24	20	13	7	-	0	97	69	26	3rd in OEHL	Won in OEHL quarter-finals (4-2 vs. Centenaires); Won in OEHL semi-finals (4-1 vs. Coyotes); Won OEHL Cup (4-0 vs. Royals)
2024–25	20	14	6	-	0	99	58	28	3rd in OEHL	Won in Paxton Trophy quarter-finals (4-0 vs. Coyotes); Won in Paxton Trophy semi-finals (4-2 vs. Centenaires); Won in Paxton Trophy finals (4-0 vs. Wolves)
2025–26	20	15	4	-	1	103	65	31	2nd in North	Won in divisional quarter-finals (4-0 vs. Lancers); Won in divisional semi-finals (4-0 vs. Harvesters); Lost in divisional finals (2-4 vs. Wolves)

More information will be added as more becomes available

== Related links ==
- Palmerston, Ontario
- Ontario Elite Hockey League
- Western Ontario Athletic Association
- WOAA Senior Hockey League
