= Saugeen Shores Winterhawks =

- City: Saugeen Shores, Ontario, Canada
- League: Ontario Elite Hockey League
- Division: North
- Founded: 2007
- Home arena: Saugeen Shores Community Complex
- Colours: Blue, Black, Grey
- General manager: Ryan Brown
- Head coach: Jeff Barfoot
- Captain: Trevor Smith
- Website: winterhawks.net

The Saugeen Shores Winterhawks are a senior hockey team in the Ontario Elite Hockey League based in Saugeen Shores, Ontario, Canada.

== History ==
With the construction of the Saugeen Shores Community Complex in 2000, there was considerable pressure to lure a senior or junior league team to the municipality, which had been without a permanent team since the Lakeshore Winterhawks folded in 1996. Following a short-lived attempt to share the Junior-B Owen Sound Greys in the first half of the decade, the Winterhawks entered the WOAA Senior Hockey League in 2007/08. The team took the name Winterhawks as a tribute to their predecessor, who played from 1989 until 1996, including their final three seasons in the WOAA senior loop. Former Lakeshore Winterhawk Don Matheson was named the first coach of the team, while defenseman Greg Thede was named captain.

The team has won four league championships, and home playoff games drew more than one thousand spectators.

The team left the WOAA loop, along with 10 other clubs in the summer of 2023 to establish the Ontario Elite Hockey League, a senior "AA" league under the Ontario Hockey Association.

== 2007–08 ==
The Winterhawks won their first ever game, defeating the Georgian Bay River Rats by a 12–1 score on the road. Saugeen Shores hosted its first ever home game on October 12, when the Shelburne Muskies made a visit, and came out on top with a score of 6–0. The Winterhawks would continue their hot streak, winning their first nine games, before losing their first game in team history, a 5–3 loss to the Elora Rocks. The Winterhawks would continue their winning ways throughout the season, ending up with a 23-3-0 record, first place in the North Division, and a spot in the "AA" playoffs.

The Winterhawks would face the Exeter Mohawks for their first ever playoff series, and the team would win their first playoff game, holding off the Mohawks for a 4–3 victory. Exeter would take the second game in overtime to even the series up, but the Winterhawks would take control of the series, easily defeating the Mohawks by a 6–2 score in the third game, followed by a 5–3 victory in the fourth game. Saugeen Shores would close out the series in the fifth game, winning 5–4, and advance to the "AA" semi-finals.

Saugeen Shores would face the Elora Rocks, the defending "AA" champions in the semi-finals. Elora would take the opening game in overtime, but the Winterhawks stormed back to win the next two games by scores of 5-4 and 7–4 to take a 2–1 series lead. Elora fought back to tie the series up again in the fourth game, then the Rocks would put Saugeen Shores on the brink of elimination with a 6–5 victory in the fifth game. Elora would end the Winterhawks season with an overtime goal in the sixth game, as they won the series 4–2.

== 2008–09 ==
Saugeen Shores would again have a very impressive regular season, as they would have the best record in the North Division for the second consecutive season, as they finished the season with a 16-3-1 record, earning 33 points.

The Winterhawks opened the post-season against the Drayton Icemen, in a best of seven series with the winner advancing to the "AA" playoffs. Saugeen Shores opened the series with a blowout victory, defeating Drayton 9–3, and then kept their foot on the gas petal in the second game, winning 7–3 to take a 2–0 series lead. The Winterhawks would have their best game in the third game, defeating the Icemen 10–3, followed by a 7–3 win in the fourth game to sweep Drayton. Saugeen Shores opponent in the "AA" quarter-finals was the Palmerston 81's. Saugeen Shores won the series, 4 games-to-1.

The Winterhawks then faced the Shelburne Muskies in the "AA" Semi-Finals. After racing out to a 3–0 series lead, the Winterhawks allowed the Muskies back into the series with three straight losses, which forced a seventh and deciding game in the series. The Winterhawks won the final game by a score of 3–2 with the overtime winner scored by Ryan Dudgeon.

Saugeen Shores then defeated the Tavistock Royals in 5 games to win the WOAA Sr. "AA" championship, winning the title in just their second year of existence. All home games in the final series had to be played at the Southampton Coliseum.

== 2009–2010 ==
Saugeen Shores had a good season, finishing 3rd in the North Division with a record of 12-5-3. They would defeat the Lucknow Lancers and Shelburne Muskies in the first two rounds of the playoffs, but lost to the eventual league champion Elora Rocks in the North Final.

== 2010–2011 ==
The Winterhawks finished 22-4-0 at the end of the regular season. They finished at the top of the North Division and went on to sweep the Shallow Lake Crushers 4 - 0 in the first round of the playoffs. The second playoffs round was just as impressive as they finished 4–0 against the Lucknow Lancers and then moved on to the battle for the North Division. The Winterhawks moved on, impressively defeating the winners from last season, Elora Rocks 4–1. Saugeen Shores went on to win against the Southern winner Monkton Wildcats in only 5 games, thus winning the WOAA Sr. "AA" championship.

After four seasons and two championships, head coach Don Matheson announced he was stepping down. He was replaced for the 2011/12 season by assistant coach Jim Grieve, who had also previously played for the Lakeshore Winterhawks.

== 2011–2012 ==
The Winterhawks finished the regular season with a record of 23-1-0, with their only loss at the hands of the Shelburne Muskies. In the first round of the playoffs, they downed the Lucknow Lancers in four straight games. In the North Division semi-final, the 'Hawks beat the Durham Thundercats in another four-game sweep. The Winterhawks met the rival Elora Rocks for the North championship and again prevailed in the minimum four games.

The Winterhawks met the Tavistock Royals in the league championship series, and completed a clean sweep of the playoffs, winning in four games and securing their second league championship in a row.

Following the season, head coach Jim Grieve stepped down.

== 2012–2013 ==
Port Elgin native and Lakeshore Winterhawks alum Peter Roedger was named head coach in July 2012.

The Winterhawks opened their quest for a third-consecutive championship with three new faces, as Andy Mitchell, Marc Roedger and Adam Shular joined the team, while Matt Turcotte, Jordan Lang and Greg Virgo did not return. Forward Tyler Kennedy joined the club midway through the season, while James McHaig & Ryan Dudgeon left the club.

They would open the season with a 5–2 win over the Shallow Lake Crushers, but would drop their home opener to the Mapleton-Minto 81's less than a week later. The Winterhawks would lose consecutive games for the first time since 2009 with a loss to the Ripley Wolves the following night.

Forward Bryan Kazarian co-captured the league scoring title with 54 points (17 goals, 33 assists), sharing the honour with Ryan Stephenson of the Komoka Classics. It marked the first time in franchise history that a Winterhawks player had won the scoring title.

The Winterhawks finished the regular season with a record of 16-7-1, good enough for 2nd place in the North Division.

The Winterhawks faced off against the Mapleton-Minto 81's in a best-of-7 North Division quarterfinal to start the playoffs. Mapleton-Minto would put a scare into the Winterhawks, forcing overtime in Game 2, but Saugeen Shores ended up prevailing, 5–4. In the remaining three games, Saugeen Shores outscored the 81's by a margin of 26–2, sweeping the series in four games.

The North Division semi-final opponent for the Winterhawks was the rival Shelburne Muskies. The Winterhawks swept the Muskies after a nail-biter of a Game 3 with the final score being 4-3 and the 'Hawks scoring 4 unanswered goals in the last 10 minutes of the 3rd.

The Winterhawks faced off against the Elora Rocks in the North Division final again and prevailed in six games.

The theme of familiar foes continued in the league final, as the Winterhawks took on the Tavistock Royals for the second straight year and third time overall. Tavistock jumped out to an early lead, thumping the Winterhawks 5–2 in the opener. The Winterhawks roared back with back-to-back overtime victories to put themselves ahead, but dropped Game 4 to the Royals, 5–1. The Winterhawks again used overtime to secure victory, taking a 4-3 decision on the road in Game 5. Using a home crowd of more than 1,000 to their advantage, the Winterhawks defeated Tavistock in Game 6 to secure their third-straight league championship.

General Manager Scott Jamieson and Assistant Coach Don MacLeod stepped down shortly after the win.

== 2013–2014 ==
On September 7, the Winterhawks announced Matheson was returning to the club, taking over the role of general manager, while Mark Kazarian was joining the coaching staff as an assistant coach.

Several new faces joined the Winterhawks for the 2013 season. Dustin Mantha, Jim Nesbitt, Greg Wardell, Kyle Roulston, Mitch Roulston, Nick Brown, Mike Bujold, Adam Alexander and Chris King all made their Winterhawks debut during the season. Goaltender Joe Kirkland signed late in the regular season and served as a back-up, but did not see any action during the regular season.

The Winterhawks were yet again near the top of the standings all season long, posting an 11-game winning streak at one point. However, three shootout losses in their final five games ended up costing the Winterhawks first place, finishing in third behind the Mapleton-Minto 81's and the Elora Rocks.

The Winterhawks defeated the Ripley Wolves in the first round of the "AA" playoffs, but fell in five games to Elora in the second round. It ended the Winterhawks three-year run as league champions.

Overall, the Winterhawks finished the season with a record of 18-3-3.

== 2014–2015 ==
The Winterhawks again experienced some turnover in the lineup, with Dustin Mantha, Jim Nesbitt, Mike Bujold, Ryan Fry, Nick Brown and Jeff Young departing.

They were replaced by Andy Fracz, Dave Grant, Jacob Brown, Jordan Smith, Scott Komer, Trent Hawke and Justin Ainslie.

The Winterhawks were again among the elite teams in the North Division, spending a majority of the season in 1st place. The team lost three games in a row to end the month of October, but rallied to reel off an impressive 14 victories in their next 15 games.

Mapleton-Minto and Durham went on runs of their own to keep pace with the Winterhawks, and while they were able to defeat the 81's on the second-to-last game of the season, it was sandwiched around losses to Durham and the Ripley Wolves, which allowed Durham to finish in 1st place.

Kazarian again lead the team in scoring, capturing his second career league scoring title.

The Winterhawks faced off against the 81's in the first round of the playoffs, dropping the series in six games, in large part due to a bevy of injuries that left the squad with only a handful of healthy bodies by the end of the series.

Assistant coach Doug Mitchell stepped down after the season.

== 2015–2016 ==
The team brought in a trio of captains from the junior-C ranks to start the season, acquiring Jay Thomson (Walkerton Hawks), Brett Brophy (Wingham Ironmen) and Mike Smailes (Kincardine Bulldogs), along with goaltenders Josh Sturrock & Blake Sinclair, and forwards Dylan Weltz and Alex Penner, who had just wrapped up an eight-year professional career.

Defenceman Justin Ainslie and goaltender Blake Sinclair joined the team mid-season.

Joe Kirkland, Shawn Walker, Adam Alexander, Tyler Kennedy, Jason Hutchinson, Matt Turcotte and Darrell Cowen were among those who departed.

The team filled the vacancy created by Doug Mitchell's departure by re-hiring Jim Grieve as an assistant coach.

The team uncharacteristically struggled early on, posting a 1-4-0 record in October. A four-game winning streak followed, but another poor stretch of 1-4-1 put a playoff spot in question.

With healthy bodies returning to the lineup, the team got on a roll, posting an 8-0-1 record to finish the regular season to finish in 3rd place in the North Division.

The final game of the regular season saw the Winterhawks turn back the clock with vintage Port Elgin Sunocos jerseys, which raised more than $6,000 for charity.

The Winterhawks faced off against the Durham Thundercats in the 1st round of the playoffs. After opening the series with a 5–3 win, Durham stormed back and took the next two, by 4-0 and 3-1 scores. The Winterhawks reeled off three victories in a row to take the series in six games.

In the North Division final, the Winterhawks met up with the powerhouse Mapleton-Minto 81's, who had lost just twice all season and were coming off a sweep of the Shallow Lake Crushers. Mapleton-Minto took the first game 5–2, but the Winterhawks scored late in Game 2 to take a 3–2 victory to even the series. Game 3 saw Mapleton-Minto win by a 6–2 score in a game that featured 108 penalty minutes. Injuries began to mount for the Winterhawks, who saw key players go down throughout the series, including their starting goaltender. Game 4 saw Mapleton-Minto win 4–3 in overtime, though the Winterhawks were able to erase a two-goal deficit to force the extra frame. Mapleton-Minto took the series in five games with a 5–4 overtime win in Game 5, but again it was the Winterhawks who battled to the very end, scoring twice in the final two minutes of regulation to force overtime. Injuries again played a major role, as the Winterhawks saw another goaltender go down to injury in Game 5.

== Season-by-season record ==
Note: GP = Games played, W = Wins, L = Losses, T= Tie, OTL = Overtime Losses, Pts = Points, GF = Goals for, GA = Goals against

Season	GP	W	L	OTL	GF	GA	PTS	Finish	Playoffs
2007–08	26	23	3	0	172	69	46	1st in North	Won in Sr. "AA" quarter-finals (4-1 vs. Mohawks); Lost in Sr. "AA" semi-finals (2-4 vs. Rocks)
2008–09	20	16	3	1	135	72	33	1st in North	Won in Sr. "AA" qualifying round (4-0 vs. Icemen); Won in Sr. "AA" quarter-finals (4-1 vs. 81's); Won in Sr. "AA" semi-finals (4-3 vs. Muskies); Won in Sr. "AA" finals (4-1 vs. Royals)
2009–10	20	12	5	3	112	86	27	3rd in North	Won in Sr. "AA" qualifying round (3-2 vs. Lancers); Won in Sr. "AA" quarter-finals (4-1 vs. Muskies); Lost in Sr. "AA" semi-finals (0-4 vs. Rocks)
2010–11	26	22	4	0	132	78	44	1st in North	Won in divisional quarter-finals (4-0 vs. Crushers); Won in divisional semi-finals (4-0 vs. Lancers); Won in divisional finals (4-1 vs. Rocks); Won in Sr. "AA" finals (4-1 vs. Wildcats)
2011–12	24	23	1	0	151	58	46	1st in North	Won in divisional quarter-finals (4-0 vs. Lancers); Won in divisional semi-finals (4-0 vs. Thundercats); Won in divisional finals (4-0 vs. Rocks); Won in Sr. "AA" finals (4-0 vs. Royals)
2012–13	24	16	7	1	122	67	33	2nd in North	Won in divisional quarter-finals (4-0 vs. 81's); Won in divisional semi-finals (4-0 vs. Muskies); Won in divisional finals (4-2 vs. Rocks); Won in Sr. "AA" finals (4-2 vs. Royals)
2013–14	24	18	3	3	126	72	39	3rd in North	Won in divisional quarter-finals (4-1 vs. Wolves); Lost in divisional semi-finals (1-4 vs. Rocks)
2014–15	24	18	5	1	132	82	37	2nd in North	Lost in divisional semi-finals (2-4 vs. 81's)
2015–16	24	14	8	2	105	74	30	3rd in North	Won in divisional semi-finals (4-2 vs. Thundercats); Lost in divisional finals (1-4 vs. 81's)
2016–17	20	18	1	1	114	42	37	1st in WOAA	Won in Sr. "AA" quarter-finals (4-1 vs. Thundercats); Lost in Sr. "AA" semi-finals (2-4 vs. Radars)
2017–18	20	10	9	1	99	57	21	6th in WOAA	Lost in Sr. "AA" quarter-finals (0-4 vs. Thundercats)
2018–19	22	14	7	1	103	74	29	4th in WOAA	Won in Sr. "AA" quarter-finals (4-1 vs. 81's); Lost in Sr. "AA" semi-finals (2-4 vs. Radars)
2019–20	22	16	6	0	101	64	32	3rd in WOAA	Lost in Sr. "AA" quarter-finals (2-4 vs. Thunder)
2020–21	Did Not Play - Season Cancelled Due to COVID-19 pandemic								
2021–22	15	9	4	2	85	54	20	4th in WOAA	Lost in Sr. "AA" quarter-finals (2-4 vs. Royals)
2022–23	20	14	5	1	96	47	29	3rd in WOAA	Won in Sr. "AA" quarter-finals (4-2 vs. Coyotes); Lost in Sr. "AA" semi-finals (3-4 vs. Wolves)
2023–24	20	11	8	1	78	54	23	7th in OEHL	Lost in OEHL quarter-finals (3-4 vs. Coyotes)
2024–25	20	11	8	1	100	87	23	5th in OEHL	Won in Paxton Trophy quarter-finals (4-1 vs. Royals); Lost in Paxton Trophy semi-finals (2-4 vs. Wolves)
2025–26	20	11	7	2	95	81	24	5th in North	Lost in divisional quarter-finals (0-4 vs. Thundercats); Won in McLean Trophy semi-finals (4-0 vs. Muskies); Won in McLean Troph finals (4-0 vs. Thunder)

NOTE - 2021-22 regular season prematurely ended due to reintroduction of COVID-19 restrictions

== Roster ==
=== Goalies ===
30 - Matt Tutin
33 - Eric Peicheff
34 - Jeff Flagler

=== Defence ===
6 - Justin Ainslie
10 - Josh Deyell
11 - Chad Schockenmaier
15 - Mike Smailes
19 - Nick Quaid
24 - Trevor Smith "C"
29 - Josh Hopkin
44 - Adam Little

=== Forwards ===
9 - Bryan Kazarian
12 - Jay Thomson
13 - Miles MacLean
14 - James McHaig
16 - Andy Mitchell "A"
17 - Andy Fracz
18 - Michael Johnstone
19 - Hunter Dubecki
20 - Blake Underwood "A"
21 - Connor Patton
22 - Jamie Shoemaker
28 - Curtis Johnston "A"
37 - Lauchlin Elder
88 - Matt Shields
91 - Trent Hawke
93 - Mike Rocca

== Related links ==
- Saugeen Shores, Ontario
- Ontario Elite Hockey League
