= Wingham Bulls =

- City: Wingham, Ontario
- League: WOAA Senior Hockey League
- Division: South
- Home arena: North Huron Wescast Community Complex
- Colours: Brown, Black, and White

Franchise history
- 1999-2005: Wingham Spitfires
- 2005-2008: Wingham Bulls

The Wingham Bulls were a senior hockey team based out of Wingham, Ontario, Canada. They played in the Western Ontario Athletic Association Senior Hockey League.

== Championships ==
The Wingham Spitfires won the WOAA Sr. "A" title three years in a row, from 2001 to 2003. A previous Wingham team with the same nickname won the 1951 WOAA Grand Championship, while in 1984, the Wingham Royals were crowned the Intermediate "A" title.

== 2006–07 Bulls season ==
The Bulls improved greatly from their 2005–06 season, and finished the year with a 12–12–0 record, which placed them 6th in the WOAA South Division.

In the opening round of the "A" playoffs, the Bulls swept the Mildmay Monarchs in 4 games.

The Bulls would face the Durham Thundercats in the "A" semi-finals, and would quickly find themselves down 2–0 in the series, being outscored 10–1 in the process. Wingham would rebound in the 3rd game, shutting out the Thundercats in Durham by a 2–0 score, however, Durham would storm back and win the 4th and 5th games of the series rather easily to take the series 4-1 and eliminate Wingham from the playoffs.

== 2007–08 Bulls season ==
After a very successful 2006–07 season, in which Wingham played .500 hockey for the first time since 2001–02, the Bulls would have a very disappointing 2007–08 season, as they had their worst record in franchise history, as they went 2–23–1, earning 5 points, and a 9th-place finish in the WOAA South Division.

Wingham would face the Monkton Wildcats in a best of 3 qualifying series, with the winning team advancing to the "A" playoffs. The Wildcats easily handled the Bulls in the series opener, winning 10–5 in Monkton, while in the 2nd game held in Wingham, the Wildcats would complete the 2-game sweep, winning 7–6, eliminating the Bulls from the playoffs.

== Folding ==
The Bulls struggled with player commitment throughout the 2007–08 season, however, the club intended to ice a team for the 2008–09 season. The player commitment issues continued, as many of the local players requested to play with other teams, and the league expanding also hindered their ability to attract players from the surrounding area. At a tryout in early September, the Bulls had only a handful of players participate, which would eventually lead the team to make the decision of folding from the league.

== Season-by-season record ==
Note: GP = Games played, W = Wins, L = Losses, T= Tie, OTL = Overtime Losses, Pts = Points, GF = Goals for, GA = Goals against

Season	GP	W	L	T	OTL	GF	GA	PTS	Finish	Playoffs
1999-00	24	15	3	5	1	120	72	36	3rd WOAA North	Lost in "AA" quarter-finals (0-4 vs. Thundercats)
2000-01	24	9	14	0	1	85	127	19	5th WOAA North	Won "A" quarter-finals (4-0 vs. Redmen); Won in "A" semi-finals (4-1 vs. River Rats); Won in "A" finals (4-1 vs. Pirates)
2001-02	24	11	11	2	0	112	113	24	5th WOAA North	Won "A" quarter-finals (3-0 in round robin vs. River Rats & Lancers); Won in "A" semi-finals (4-0 vs. Lancers); Won in "A" finals (4-1 vs. Pirates)
2002-03	24	8	13	0	3	107	149	19	11th WOAA Sr	Won "A" quarter-finals (3-0 in round robin vs. River Rats & Pirates); Won in "A" semi-finals (4-0 vs. Wildcats); Won in "A" finals (4-0 vs. River Rats)
2003-04	24	10	13	1	0	100	129	21	10th WOAA Sr	Lost in qualifying round (1-3 vs. Muskies); Won in "A" quarter-finals (4-1 vs. Monarchs); Lost in "A" semi-finals (1-4 vs. River Rats)
2004-05	25	6	18	0	1	93	159	15	15th WOAA Sr	Won in elimination round (2-0 vs. Crusaders); Lost in qualifying round (1-3 vs. Royals); Lost in "A" quarter-finals (0-4 vs. Lancers)
2005-06	25	5	18	-	2	87	149	12	16th WOAA Sr	Lost in elimination round (1-2 vs. Jets)
2006-07	24	12	12	-	0	103	118	24	6th WOAA South	Won in "A" quarter-finals (4-0 vs. Monarchs); Lost in "A" semi-finals (1-4 vs. Thundercats)
2007-08	26	2	23	-	1	77	155	5	9th WOAA South	Lost in elimination round (0-2 vs. Wildcats)

More information will be added as more becomes available

== See also ==
- Wingham, Ontario
- Western Ontario Athletic Association
- WOAA Senior Hockey League
