= Creemore Coyotes =

Canadian hockey team

- City: Creemore, Ontario, Canada
- League: Ontario Elite Hockey League
- Conference: North
- Home arena: Creemore and District Recreation Centre
- Colours: Red, White, and Black
- General manager: Thomas Macham
- Head coach: Andrew Shipley
- Website: creemorecoyotes.com

The Creemore Coyotes are a senior hockey team based out of Creemore, Ontario, Canada. They play in the Ontario Elite Hockey League.

== 2021-22 Coyotes season ==
The Coyotes joined the WOAA Sr. "AA" Hockey League for the 2021–22 season. In their first ever game, the Coyotes lost to the Shelburne Muskies by a score of 7–5. After losing their first five games, Creemore won their first ever game, defeating the Lucknow Lancers 6–3. The Coyotes finished the season with a 5-12-0 record, earning 10 points and a 12th place in the WOAA standings. Colin Kijowksi led the Coyotes with nine goals and Kris Dobinson led the club with 16 points.

In the post-season, the Coyotes faced the Milverton Four Wheel Drives in the "A" quarter-finals, losing the best-of-three series two-games-to-one.

== 2022-23 Coyotes season ==
Creemore saw a big improvement over their first season in the league, as the Coyotes posted a 12-7-1 record, earning 25 points and a sixth-place finish in the WOAA standings. Ben Hughes led the club with 16 goals and 27 points.

In the "AA" playoffs, the Coyotes lost to the Saugeen Shores Winterhawks in the quarter-finals in six games.

== 2023-24 Coyotes season ==
The Coyotes joined the Ontario Elite Hockey League for its inaugural season in 2023–24. On October 14, 2023, Creemore defeated the Georgian Bay Applekings in their first game by a score of 8–2. The Coyotes had a very successful season, finishing in second place in the OEHL with a 14-6-0 record, earning 28 points. JD Falconer led the team and placed second in the league with 39 points in 19 games. Ben Hughes finished second in the OEHL with 18 goals. In goal, Mason Kameka had a 10-4-1 record with a 3.04 GAA and a 0.861 save percentage with two shutouts.

In the post-season, Creemore defeated the Saugeen Shores Winterhawks in seven games in the OEHL quarter-finals. In the semi-finals, the Coyotes were upset by the Minto 81's in five games.

== Season-by-season record ==
Note: GP = Games played, W = Wins, L = Losses, OTL = Overtime Losses, Pts = Points, GF = Goals for, GA = Goals against

Season	GP	W	L	OTL	GF	GA	PTS	Finish	Playoffs
2021-22	17	5	12	0	58	87	10	12nd WOAA	Lost in "A" quarter-finals (1-2 vs. Four Wheel Drives)
2022-23	20	12	7	1	92	94	25	6th WOAA	Lost in "AA" quarter-finals (2-4 vs. Winterhawks)
2023-24	20	14	5	1	99	66	29	2nd OEHL	Won in OEHL quarter-finals (4-3 vs. Winterhawks); Lost in OEHL semi-finals (1-4 vs. 81's)
2024-25	20	9	9	2	84	73	20	6th OEHL	Lost in Paxton Trophy quarter-finals (0-4 vs. 81's)
2025-26	20	2	18	0	61	153	4	8th in North	Lost in preliminary round (1-2 vs. Muskies)

== Related links ==
- Creemore, Ontario
- Ontario Elite Hockey League
