= 2021–22 WOAA Senior League season =

- League: WOAA Senior AA Hockey League
- Sport: Hockey
- Duration: Regular season October 2021 – January 2022; Playoffs; February 2022 – April 2022
- Teams: 13
- Finals champions: Sr. AA - Seaforth Centenaires; Sr. A - Shallow Lake Crushers

WOAA Senior League seasons
- 2020–21 2022–23

The 2021–22 WOAA Senior League season was the 32nd season of the WOAA Senior AA Hockey League. The league was scheduled to play a 20-game regular season which began in October 2021 and concluded in January 2022. The post-season began in February 2022 and concluded in April 2022.

The Seaforth Centenaires won the WOAA Senior AA Hockey Championship, defeating the Clinton Radars in the final round of the playoffs.

== Team changes ==
- On April 21, 2021, the Elora Rocks announced they were withdrawing from the league to join the Western Ontario Super Hockey League beginning in the 2021–22 season.
- On April 21, 2021, the Tillsonburg Thunder announced they were withdrawing from the league to join the Western Ontario Super Hockey League beginning in the 2021–22 season.
- On June 4, 2021, the league announced that it had approved the expansion application for the Creemore Coyotes to join the league beginning in the 2021–22 season.

== Regular season ==
=== COVID-19 ===
Due to COVID-19 restrictions in Ontario effective on January 5, 2022, all municipally operated recreation facilities were closed until January 26, temporarily bringing at halt to the WOAA Senior Hockey League schedule.

On January 11, representatives from all teams agreed to fulfill their commitment to the league, regardless of any limitations that may be in place after January 26. All teams were in agreement that playoffs are a priority to begin on February 4. In order to meet the February 4th deadline, as the full regular season schedule could not be completed, all teams agreed that the final standings be calculated based on a points percentage basis to determine final positioning for the playoffs.

=== Final standings ===
Note: GP = Games played; W = Wins; L= Losses; OTL = Overtime losses; GF = Goals for; GA = Goals against; Pts = Points; Green shade = Clinched playoff spot

| Rank | WOAA Senior League | GP | W | L | OTL | Pts | Pct. | GF | GA |
|---|---|---|---|---|---|---|---|---|---|
| 1 | Ripley Wolves | 14 | 11 | 2 | 1 | 23 | 0.821 | 69 | 36 |
| 2 | Seaforth Centenaires | 13 | 10 | 3 | 0 | 20 | 0.769 | 103 | 65 |
| 3 | Minto 81's | 12 | 8 | 4 | 0 | 16 | 0.667 | 48 | 31 |
| 4 | Saugeen Shores Winterhawks | 15 | 9 | 4 | 2 | 20 | 0.667 | 85 | 54 |
| 5 | Tavistock Royals | 13 | 8 | 4 | 1 | 17 | 0.654 | 72 | 51 |
| 6 | Clinton Radars | 13 | 8 | 5 | 0 | 16 | 0.615 | 56 | 40 |
| 7 | Durham Thundercats | 15 | 9 | 6 | 0 | 18 | 0.600 | 53 | 47 |
| 8 | Shelburne Muskies | 17 | 8 | 9 | 0 | 16 | 0.470 | 72 | 71 |
| 9 | Petrolia Squires | 13 | 4 | 7 | 2 | 10 | 0.385 | 43 | 59 |
| 10 | Lucknow Lancers | 15 | 5 | 10 | 0 | 10 | 0.333 | 47 | 73 |
| 11 | Shallow Lake Crushers | 14 | 4 | 9 | 1 | 9 | 0.321 | 38 | 62 |
| 12 | Creemore Coyotes | 17 | 5 | 12 | 0 | 10 | 0.294 | 58 | 87 |
| 13 | Milverton Four Wheel Drives | 13 | 3 | 9 | 1 | 7 | 0.269 | 47 | 82 |

=== Scoring leaders ===
Note: GP = Games played; G = Goals; A = Assists; Pts = Points; PIM = Penalty minutes

| Player | Team | GP | G | A | Pts | PIM |
|---|---|---|---|---|---|---|
| Cody Britton | Ripley Wolves | 14 | 12 | 13 | 25 | 25 |
| Miles MacLean | Saugeen Shores Winterhawks | 14 | 13 | 10 | 23 | 2 |
| Garrett Meurs | Ripley Wolves | 11 | 12 | 11 | 23 | 12 |
| Luke Richardson | Shelburne Muskies | 17 | 9 | 14 | 23 | 0 |
| Justin Graham | Durham Thundercats | 15 | 10 | 12 | 22 | 10 |
| Justin Graham | Shelburne Muskies | 14 | 10 | 12 | 22 | 4 |
| Quinten Bruce | Durham Thundercats | 14 | 12 | 9 | 21 | 24 |
| Isaac McLean | Petrolia Squires | 13 | 9 | 12 | 21 | 0 |
| Holdyn Lansink | Seaforth Centenaires | 12 | 4 | 17 | 21 | 8 |
| Trevor Sauder | Tavistock Royals | 10 | 10 | 10 | 20 | 2 |

== Playoffs ==
=== WOAA Senior "AA" Hockey playoffs ===
The top eight teams qualify for the WOAA Senior "AA" Hockey playoffs. Each series is a best-of-seven.

WOAA Sr. AA quarter-finals
1 | Ripley | 4
8 | Shelburne | 0
3 | Minto | 3
6 | Clinton | 4
2 | Seaforth | 4
7 | Durham | 1
4 | Saugeen Shores | 2
5 | Tavistock | 4

WOAA Sr. AA semi-finals
1 | Ripley | 1
6 | Clinton | 4
2 | Seaforth | 4
5 | Tavistock | 1

WOAA Sr. AA finals
6 | Clinton | 1
2 | Seaforth | 4

==== WOAA Senior AA quarter-finals ====
===== (1) Ripley Wolves vs. (8) Shelburne Muskies =====
| February 4 | Shelburne Muskies | 1 – 7 | Ripley Wolves | Ripley-Huron Arena |

| February 5 | Ripley Wolves | 6 – 2 | Shelburne Muskies | Centre Dufferin Recreation Complex |

| February 12 | Ripley Wolves | 5 – 3 | Shelburne Muskies | Centre Dufferin Recreation Complex |

| February 18 | Ripley Wolves | 2 – 9 | Shelburne Muskies | Centre Dufferin Recreation Complex |

| Ripley wins series 4 – 0 |

===== (2) Seaforth Centenaires vs. (7) Durham Thundercats =====
| February 5 | Durham Thundercats | 5 – 4 | Seaforth Centenaires | Seaforth Community Centre |

| February 6 | Seaforth Centenaires | 3 – 2 | OT | Durham Thundercats | Durham Community Centre |

| February 11 | Seaforth Centenaires | 5 – 2 | Durham Thundercats | Durham Community Centre |

| February 12 | Durham Thundercats | 2 – 4 | Seaforth Centenaires | Seaforth Community Centre |

| February 18 | Durham Thundercats | 1 – 2 | Seaforth Centenaires | Seaforth Community Centre |

| Seaforth wins series 4 – 1 |

===== (3) Minto 81's vs. (6) Clinton Radars =====
| February 5 | Clinton Radars | 3 – 4 | 2OT | Minto 81's | Palmerston Community Centre |

| February 11 | Minto 81's | 4 – 5 | OT | Clinton Radars | Central Huron Community Complex |

| February 12 | Clinton Radars | 2 – 6 | Minto 81's | Palmerston Community Centre |

| February 18 | Minto 81's | 4 – 3 | OT | Clinton Radars | Central Huron Community Complex |

| February 20 | Clinton Radars | 5 – 2 | Minto 81's | Palmerston Community Centre |

| February 25 | Minto 81's | 3 – 4 | Clinton Radars | Central Huron Community Complex |

| February 26 | Clinton Radars | 4 – 1 | Minto 81's | Palmerston Community Centre |

| Clinton wins series 4 – 3 |

===== (4) Saugeen Shores Winterhawks vs. (5) Tavistock Royals =====
Note: Game three was played at the Southampton Coliseum in Southampton, Ontario.

| February 4 | Tavistock Royals | 3 – 2 | Saugeen Shores Winterhawks | Port Elgin Plex |

| February 5 | Saugeen Shores Winterhawks | 1 – 4 | Tavistock Royals | Tavistock Recreation Centre |

| February 11 | Tavistock Royals | 2 – 6 | Saugeen Shores Winterhawks | Port Elgin Plex |

| February 13 | Saugeen Shores Winterhawks | 4 – 2 | Tavistock Royals | Tavistock Recreation Centre |

| February 18 | Tavistock Royals | 5 – 2 | Saugeen Shores Winterhawks | Port Elgin Plex |

| February 20 | Saugeen Shores Winterhawks | 3 – 4 | OT | Tavistock Royals | Tavistock Recreation Centre |

| Tavistock wins series 4 – 2 |

==== WOAA Senior AA semi-finals ====
===== (1) Ripley Wolves vs. (6) Clinton Radars =====
| February 27 | Clinton Radars | 5 – 2 | Ripley Wolves | Ripley-Huron Arena |

| March 4 | Ripley Wolves | 2 – 3 | Clinton Radars | Central Huron Community Complex |

| March 5 | Clinton Radars | 1 – 4 | Ripley Wolves | Ripley-Huron Arena |

| March 11 | Ripley Wolves | 2 – 3 | OT | Clinton Radars | Central Huron Community Complex |

| March 12 | Clinton Radars | 5 – 1 | Ripley Wolves | Ripley-Huron Arena |

| Clinton wins series 4 – 1 |

===== (2) Seaforth Centenaires vs. (5) Tavistock Royals =====
| February 27 | Tavistock Royals | 2 – 4 | Seaforth Centenaires | Seaforth Community Centre |

| March 5 | Seaforth Centenaires | 4 – 3 | Tavistock Royals | Tavistock Recreation Centre |

| March 6 | Tavistock Royals | 4 – 2 | Seaforth Centenaires | Seaforth Community Centre |

| March 11 | Seaforth Centenaires | 7 – 4 | Tavistock Royals | Tavistock Recreation Centre |

| March 12 | Tavistock Royals | 1 – 2 | Seaforth Centenaires | Seaforth Community Centre |

| Seaforth wins series 4 – 1 |

==== WOAA Sr. AA Championship ====
===== (2) Seaforth Centenaires vs. (6) Clinton Radars =====
| March 19 | Clinton Radars | 0 – 1 | Seaforth Centenaires | Seaforth Community Centre |

| March 25 | Seaforth Centenaires | 4 – 1 | Clinton Radars | Central Huron Community Complex |

| March 26 | Clinton Radars | 1 – 5 | Seaforth Centenaires | Seaforth Community Centre |

| April 1 | Seaforth Centenaires | 1 – 6 | Clinton Radars | Central Huron Community Complex |

| April 2 | Clinton Radars | 1 – 2 | Seaforth Centenaires | Seaforth Community Centre |

| Seaforth wins series 4 – 1 |

=== WOAA Senior "A" Hockey playoffs ===
The bottom five teams qualified for the WOAA Senior "A" Hockey playoffs.

WOAA Sr. A quarter-finals
9 | Petrolia | bye
12 | Creemore | 1
13 | Milverton | 2
10 | Lucknow | bye
11 | Shallow Lake | bye

WOAA Sr. A semi-finals
9 | Petrolia | 4
13 | Milverton | 0
10 | Lucknow | 3
11 | Shallow Lake | 4

WOAA Sr. A finals
9 | Petrolia | 2
11 | Shallow Lake | 4

==== WOAA Senior A quarter-finals ====
===== (12) Creemore Coyotes vs. (13) Milverton Four Wheel Drives =====
| February 5 | Milverton Four Wheel Drives | 7 – 3 | Creemore Coyotes | Creemore Recreation Centre |

| February 6 | Creemore Coyotes | 8 – 3 | Milverton Four Wheel Drives | Perth East Recreational Complex |

| February 12 | Milverton Four Wheel Drives | 7 – 5 | Creemore Coyotes | Creemore Recreation Centre |

| Milverton wins series 2 – 1 |

==== WOAA Senior A semi-finals ====
===== (9) Petrolia Squires vs. (13) Milverton Four Wheel Drives =====
| February 20 | Petrolia Squires | 6 – 5 | OT | Milverton Four Wheel Drives | Perth East Recreational Complex |

| February 22 | Milverton Four Wheel Drives | 5 – 8 | Petrolia Squires | Greenwood Recreation Centre |

| February 26 | Milverton Four Wheel Drives | 2 – 6 | Petrolia Squires | Greenwood Recreation Centre |

| February 27 | Petrolia Squires | 4 – 3 | OT | Milverton Four Wheel Drives | Perth East Recreational Complex |

| Petrolia wins series 4 – 0 |

===== (10) Lucknow Lancers vs. (11) Shallow Lake Crushers =====
| February 12 | Shallow Lake Crushers | 2 – 4 | Lucknow Lancers | Lucknow Arena |

| February 18 | Lucknow Lancers | 5 – 4 | OT | Shallow Lake Crushers | Shallow Lake Arena |

| February 20 | Shallow Lake Crushers | 3 – 2 | OT | Lucknow Lancers | Lucknow Arena |

| February 25 | Lucknow Lancers | 5 – 2 | Shallow Lake Crushers | Shallow Lake Arena |

| February 26 | Shallow Lake Crushers | 2 – 1 | OT | Lucknow Lancers | Lucknow Arena |

| March 4 | Lucknow Lancers | 0 – 1 | Shallow Lake Crushers | Shallow Lake Arena |

| March 5 | Shallow Lake Crushers | 4 – 3 | OT | Lucknow Lancers | Lucknow Arena |

| Shallow Lake wins series 4 – 3 |

==== WOAA Sr. A Championship ====
===== (9) Petrolia Squires vs. (11) Shallow Lake Crushers =====
| March 18 | Shallow Lake Crushers | 2 – 4 | Petrolia Squires | Greenwood Recreation Centre |

| March 19 | Petrolia Squires | 3 – 4 | OT | Shallow Lake Crushers | Shallow Lake Arena |

| March 26 | Shallow Lake Crushers | 8 – 3 | Petrolia Squires | Greenwood Recreation Centre |

| April 1 | Petrolia Squires | 3 – 8 | Shallow Lake Crushers | Shallow Lake Arena |

| April 2 | Shallow Lake Crushers | 2 – 3 | Petrolia Squires | Greenwood Recreation Centre |

| April 3 | Petrolia Squires | 1 – 4 | Shallow Lake Crushers | Shallow Lake Arena |

| Shallow Lake wins series 4 – 2 |
