= 2019–20 WOAA Senior League season =

- League: WOAA Senior AA Hockey League
- Sport: Hockey
- Duration: Regular season October 2019 – January 2020; Playoffs; February 2020 – March 2020
- Teams: 14
- Finals champions: Cancelled

WOAA Senior League seasons
- 2018–19 2020–21

The 2019–20 WOAA Senior League season was the 30th season of the WOAA Senior AA Hockey League. The league played a 22-game regular season which began in October 2019 and concluded in January 2020. The post-season began in February 2020, however, the playoffs would be cancelled due to the COVID-19 pandemic.

== Team changes ==
- The Mapleton-Minto 81's are renamed the Minto 81's and move all their home games to the Palmerston & District Community Centre.
- The Huron East Centenaires are rebranded as the Seaforth Centenaires.

== Regular season ==
=== Final standings ===
Note: GP = Games played; W = Wins; L= Losses; OTL = Overtime losses; GF = Goals for; GA = Goals against; Pts = Points; Green shade = Clinched playoff spot

Rank	WOAA Senior League	GP	W	L	OTL	Pts	GF	GA
1	Ripley Wolves	22	19	3	0	38	125	50
2	Shelburne Muskies	22	17	5	0	34	95	71
3	Saugeen Shores Winterhawks	22	16	6	0	32	101	64
4	Clinton Radars	22	16	6	0	32	121	62
5	Seaforth Centenaires	22	15	5	2	32	122	77
6	Tillsonburg Thunder	22	13	7	2	28	112	88
7	Minto 81's	22	13	8	1	27	98	87
8	Durham Thundercats	22	12	9	1	25	100	90
9	Tavistock Royals	22	9	11	2	20	102	108
10	Elora Rocks	22	8	13	1	17	83	109
11	Milverton Four Wheel Drives	22	5	13	4	14	83	143
12	Petrolia Squires	22	6	16	0	12	78	132
13	Lucknow Lancers	22	3	16	3	9	55	132
14	Shallow Lake Crushers	22	2	19	1	5	60	122

=== Scoring leaders ===
Note: GP = Games played; G = Goals; A = Assists; Pts = Points; PIM = Penalty minutes

Player	Team	GP	G	A	Pts	PIM
Garrett Meurs	Ripley Wolves	21	24	24	48	22
Adam Kawalec	Minto 81's	22	22	23	45	8
Holdyn Lansink	Seaforth Centenaires	19	23	21	44	40
Rob Van Wynsberghe	Seaforth Centenaires	21	22	16	38	8
Wade Pfeffer	Minto 81's	21	10	27	37	12
Max Campbell	Clinton Radars	19	18	18	36	2
Justin Graham (#8)	Durham Thundercats	22	8	26	34	14
Cody Britton	Ripley Wolves	22	20	12	32	14
Luke Richardson	Shelburne Muskies	21	11	21	32	44
Justin Graham (#22)	Durham Thundercats	19	10	22	32	74

== Playoffs ==
On Friday, March 13th, the WOAA Senior Hockey League suspended operations until further notice due to health concerns relating to the COVID-19 pandemic.

On Wednesday, March 18th, the remainder of the playoffs was cancelled.

=== WOAA Senior "AA" Hockey playoffs ===
The top eight teams qualify for the WOAA Senior "AA" Hockey playoffs. Each series is a best-of-seven.

WOAA Sr. AA quarter-finals
1	Ripley	4
8	Durham	3
2	Shelburne	2
7	Minto	4
3	Saugeen Shores	2
6	Tillsonburg	4
4	Clinton	4
5	Seaforth	2

WOAA Sr. AA semi-finals
1	Ripley	2
7	Minto	2
6	Tillsonburg	1
4	Clinton	3

WOAA Sr. AA finals

==== WOAA Senior AA quarter-finals ====
===== (1) Ripley Wolves vs. (8) Durham Thundercats =====
February 7	Durham Thundercats	2 – 9	Ripley Wolves	Ripley-Huron Arena

February 8	Ripley Wolves	5 – 6	Durham Thundercats	Durham and District Community Centre

February 14	Ripley Wolves	2 – 3	Durham Thundercats	Durham and District Community Centre

February 15	Durham Thundercats	2 – 3	OT	Ripley Wolves	Ripley-Huron Arena

February 22	Durham Thundercats	3 – 2	OT	Ripley Wolves	Ripley-Huron Arena

February 23	Ripley Wolves	5 – 2	Durham Thundercats	Durham and District Community Centre

February 25	Durham Thundercats	3 – 8	Ripley Wolves	Ripley-Huron Arena

Ripley wins series 4 – 3

===== (2) Shelburne Muskies vs. (7) Minto 81's =====
February 8	Minto 81's	5 – 2	Shelburne Muskies	Centre Dufferin Recreation Complex

February 9	Shelburne Muskies	2 – 6	Minto 81's	Palmerston Community Centre

February 15	Minto 81's	2 – 3	OT	Shelburne Muskies	Centre Dufferin Recreation Complex

February 16	Shelburne Muskies	2 – 4	Minto 81's	Palmerston Community Centre

February 22	Minto 81's	3 – 6	Shelburne Muskies	Centre Dufferin Recreation Complex

February 23	Shelburne Muskies	2 – 3	2OT	Minto 81's	Palmerston Community Centre

Minto wins series 4 – 2

===== (3) Saugeen Shores Winterhawks vs. (6) Tillsonburg Thunder =====
February 7	Tillsonburg Thunder	5 – 4	OT	Saugeen Shores Winterhawks	Port Elgin Plex

February 8	Saugeen Shores Winterhawks	2 – 6	Tillsonburg Thunder	Colin Campbell Arena

February 14	Tillsonburg Thunder	4 – 6	Saugeen Shores Winterhawks	Port Elgin Plex

February 16	Saugeen Shores Winterhawks	2 – 3	Tillsonburg Thunder	Colin Campbell Arena

February 21	Tillsonburg Thunder	0 – 4	Saugeen Shores Winterhawks	Port Elgin Plex

February 22	Saugeen Shores Winterhawks	2 – 4	Tillsonburg Thunder	Colin Campbell Arena

Tillsonburg wins series 4 – 2

===== (4) Clinton Radars vs. (5) Seaforth Centenaires =====
February 7	Seaforth Centenaires	2 – 3	Clinton Radars	Central Huron Community Complex

February 9	Clinton Radars	1 – 4	Seaforth Centenaires	Seaforth Community Centre

February 14	Seaforth Centenaires	3 – 7	Clinton Radars	Central Huron Community Complex

February 15	Clinton Radars	0 – 4	Seaforth Centenaires	Seaforth Community Centre

February 21	Seaforth Centenaires	2 – 3	Clinton Radars	Central Huron Community Complex

February 22	Clinton Radars	6 – 2	Seaforth Centenaires	Seaforth Community Centre

Clinton wins series 4 – 2

==== WOAA Senior AA semi-finals ====
===== (1) Ripley Wolves vs. (7) Minto 81's =====
February 29	Minto 81's	0 – 6	Ripley Wolves	Ripley-Huron Arena

March 1	Ripley Wolves	4 – 3	Minto 81's	Palmerston Community Centre

March 7	Minto 81's	6 – 4	Ripley Wolves	Ripley-Huron Arena

March 10	Ripley Wolves	2 – 5	Minto 81's	Palmerston Community Centre

Series tied 2 – 2

===== (4) Clinton Radars vs. (6) Tillsonburg Thunder =====
February 29	Clinton Radars	1 – 2	Tillsonburg Thunder	Colin Campbell Arena

March 6	Tillsonburg Thunder	4 – 5	Clinton Radars	Central Huron Community Complex

March 7	Clinton Radars	5 – 0	Tillsonburg Thunder	Colin Campbell Arena

March 8	Tillsonburg Thunder	2 – 6	Clinton Radars	Central Huron Community Complex

Clinton leads series 3 – 1

=== WOAA Senior "A" Hockey playoffs ===
The bottom six teams qualified for the WOAA Senior "A" Hockey playoffs.

WOAA Sr. A quarter-finals
9	Tavistock	bye
12	Petrolia	0
13	Lucknow	2
10	Elora	bye
11	Milverton	2
14	Shallow Lake	0

WOAA Sr. A semi-finals
9	Tavistock	4
13	Lucknow	0
10	Elora	2
11	Milverton	4

WOAA Sr. A finals
9	Tavistock	0
11	Milverton	'0

==== WOAA Senior A quarter-finals ====
===== (11) Milverton Four Wheel Drives vs. (14) Shallow Lake Crushers =====
February 7	Shallow Lake Crushers	4 – 7	Milverton Four Wheel Drives	Perth East Recreational Complex

February 14	Milverton Four Wheel Drives	6 – 3	Shallow Lake Crushers	Shallow Lake Arena

Milverton wins series 2 – 0

===== (12) Petrolia Squires vs. (13) Lucknow Lancers =====
February 7	Lucknow Lancers	4 – 2	Petrolia Squires	Greenwood Recreation Centre

February 9	Petrolia Squires	1 – 5	Lucknow Lancers	Lucknow Arena

Lucknow wins series 2 – 0

==== WOAA Senior A semi-finals ====
===== (9) Tavistock Royals vs. (13) Lucknow Lancers =====
February 21	Lucknow Lancers	2 – 3	OT	Tavistock Royals	Tavistock Recreation Centre

February 22	Tavistock Royals	4 – 3	OT	Lucknow Lancers	Lucknow Arena

February 29	Lucknow Lancers	4 – 8	Tavistock Royals	Tavistock Recreation Centre

March 1	Tavistock Royals	6 – 5	Lucknow Lancers	Lucknow Arena

Tavistock wins series 4 – 0

===== (10) Elora Rocks vs. (11) Milverton Four Wheel Drives =====
February 21	Milverton Four Wheel Drives	5 – 3	Elora Rocks	Elora Community Centre

February 23	Elora Rocks	7 – 6	OT	Milverton Four Wheel Drives	Perth East Recreation Complex

February 29	Milverton Four Wheel Drives	8 – 6	Elora Rocks	Elora Community Centre

March 1	Elora Rocks	3 – 4	Milverton Four Wheel Drives	Perth East Recreation Complex

March 6	Milverton Four Wheel Drives	5 – 8	Elora Rocks	Elora Community Centre

March 7	Elora Rocks	3 – 4	OT	Milverton Four Wheel Drives	Perth East Recreation Complex

Milverton wins series 4 – 2
