= 2020–21 WOAA Senior League season =

- League: WOAA Senior AA Hockey League
- Sport: Hockey
- Duration: Cancelled
- Teams: 14
- Finals champions: Cancelled

WOAA Senior League seasons
- 2019–20 2021–22

The 2020–21 WOAA Senior League season was the 31st season of the WOAA Senior AA Hockey League. The league was scheduled to play a 20-game regular season which would begin in October 2020 and conclude in January 2021. The post-season would begin in February 2021 and conclude in April 2021.

On September 24, 2020, the season was cancelled due to COVID-19.

== Cancellation ==
On September 24, 2020, the league held its annual meeting and the following statement was released:
"The impact of the COVID-19 outbreak has created a unique situation that is still evolving; the W.O.A.A. continues to work with its Senior Hockey Committee and participating Senior Hockey teams to prepare for the return to regular competition.
However, the W.O.A.A. Senior Hockey membership held their annual meeting last evening, September 24, 2020, and at that time a motion was moved, seconded and carried "that collectively as members of the W.O.A.A. Senior Hockey League a decision was made that there would be NO playing season for the 2020-2021 hockey season. It will be the responsibility of each member team to remit their 2020-2021 insurance premium and the W.O.A.A. registration fee.
The W.O.A.A. Senior Hockey records show that the program began in 1948-49 and has run continuously for seventy-two (72) hockey seasons. We are hopeful that 2021-2022 will see the return of regular competition in our Senior Hockey League.
At this time, the W.O.A.A. would like to take this opportunity to thank all of our Senior Hockey participants, team officials, game officials, executives, league sponsors, fans and valued volunteers for their past and present support.
Yours in Senior Hockey
David K. Black
W.O.A.A. Immediate Past President and Acting Chairman.
