= 2026–27 OEHL season =

4th season of the Ontario Elite Hockey League

- League: Ontario Elite Hockey League
- Sport: Hockey
- Duration: Regular season September 27, 2026 – January 23, 2027; Playoffs; February 2027 – April 2027
- Teams: 19
- Finals champions: J. F. Paxton Trophy: Hugh McLean Trophy:

OEHL seasons
- 2025–26 2027–28

The 2026–27 OEHL season is the fourth season of the Ontario Elite Hockey League. The league began play on September 27, 2026 and will conclude on January 23, 2027. The post-season will begin play in February 2027 and conclude in April 2027.

The winner of the J. F. Paxton Trophy will represent the OEHL at the Allan Cup.

== Off-season ==
=== Expansion ===
On June 26, 2026, the OEHL member clubs and the Ontario Hockey Association approved the expansion application and announced that the Ridgetown Rebels would join the league in the South Conference, bringing the total number of teams to 19.

=== Conferences ===
The OEHL announced that the Erin Outlaws would move from the South Conference to the North Conference. The league also announced that all teams will play a 20-game regular season schedule within their own conference.

2026–27 OEHL Conferences
North Conference	South Conference
Creemore Coyotes	Delhi Flames
Durham Thundercats	Dunnville Aeros
Elmvale Harvesters	Elora Rocks
Erin Outlaws	Milverton Four Wheel Drives
Georgian Bay Applekings	Petrolia Squires
Lucknow Lancers	Ridgetown Rebels
Minto 81's	Seaforth Centenaires
Ripley Wolves	Tavistock Royals
Saugeen Shores Winterhawks	Tillsonburg Thunder
Shelburne Muskies

== Regular season ==
=== Standings ===
Note: GP = Games played; W = Wins; L= Losses; OTL = Overtime losses; GF = Goals for; GA = Goals against; Pts = Points; Green shade = Clinched playoff spot
as of November 22, 2026

Rank	North Conference	GP	W	L	OTL	SL	Pts	GF	GA
1	Durham Thundercats	8	8	0	0	0	16	68	24
2	Erin Outlaws	10	6	3	1	0	13	54	46
3	Ripley Wolves	7	5	0	2	0	12	41	19
4	Elmvale Harvesters	8	5	3	0	0	10	46	36
5	Saugeen Shores Winterhawks	8	5	3	0	0	10	37	37
6	Minto 81's	6	4	1	0	1	9	25	20
7	Creemore Coyotes	11	3	5	3	0	9	52	64
8	Lucknow Lancers	8	3	5	0	0	6	28	40
9	Georgian Bay Applekings	9	2	7	0	0	4	34	60
10	Shelburne Muskies	9	1	8	0	0	2	22	61

Rank	South Conference	GP	W	L	OTL	SL	Pts	GF	GA
1	Elora Rocks	9	9	0	0	0	18	62	26
2	Seaforth Centenaires	10	9	1	0	0	18	50	16
3	Dunnville Aeros	11	7	4	0	0	14	63	42
4	Tavistock Royals	8	5	2	0	1	11	46	25
5	Petrolia Squires	9	5	3	1	0	11	32	28
6	Ridgetown Rebels	11	4	7	0	0	8	41	53
7	Tillsonburg Thunder	9	3	5	1	0	7	33	44
8	Milverton Four Wheel Drives	10	2	7	1	0	5	25	43
9	Delhi Flames	11	0	11	0	0	0	19	94

== Playoffs ==
=== J. F. Paxton Trophy playoffs ===
The top eight teams in each conference qualify for the J.F. Paxton Trophy playoffs.

=== Hugh McLean Trophy playoffs ===
The ninth place team in the North Conference and the ninth and tenth place teams in South Conference are placed into the Hugh McLean Trophy playoffs. Teams that do not advance past the first round of the J.F. Paxton Trophy playoffs have the option to join the Hugh McLean Trophy playoffs.
