= 2022–23 WOAA Senior League season =

- League: WOAA Senior AA Hockey League
- Sport: Hockey
- Duration: Regular season October 2022 – January 2023; Playoffs; February 2023 – March 2023
- Teams: 12
- Finals champions: Sr. AA - Tavistock Royals; Sr. A - Milverton Four Wheel Drives

WOAA Senior League seasons
- 2021–22 2023–24

The 2022–23 WOAA Senior League season was the 33rd and final season of the WOAA Senior AA Hockey League. The league played a 20-game regular season which began in October 2022 and concluded in January 2023. The post-season began in February 2023 and concluded in March 2023.

The Tavistock Royals won the WOAA Sr. AA Championship, defeating the Ripley Wolves in the final round of the playoffs.

Following the season, the WOAA Senior League disbanded and the Ontario Elite Hockey League was created.

== Team changes ==
- On June 2, the Western Ontario Super Hockey League announced that the Petrolia Squires would be joining their league in 2023–24.
- On June 16, the league announced an expansion team for Thornbury, Ontario for the 2023-24 season. On June 23, the team was announced as the Georgian Bay Applekings. The team will play at the Beaver Valley Community Centre.
- On September 28, the Clinton Radars informed the league they were taking a leave of absence for the 2022–23 season.

== Regular season ==
=== Final standings ===
Note: GP = Games played; W = Wins; L= Losses; OTL = Overtime losses; GF = Goals for; GA = Goals against; Pts = Points; Green shade = Clinched playoff spot

Rank	WOAA Senior League	GP	W	L	OTL	Pts	GF	GA
1	Seaforth Centenaires	20	17	1	2	36	104	37
2	Ripley Wolves	20	14	4	2	30	103	65
3	Saugeen Shores Winterhawks	20	14	5	1	29	96	47
4	Minto 81's	20	14	5	1	29	85	54
5	Tavistock Royals	20	13	5	2	28	97	75
6	Creemore Coyotes	20	12	7	1	25	92	94
7	Petrolia Squires	20	12	8	0	24	96	68
8	Durham Thundercats	20	10	9	1	21	72	71
9	Shallow Lake Crushers	20	5	15	0	10	51	100
10	Milverton Four Wheel Drives	20	4	16	0	8	65	116
11	Shelburne Muskies	20	3	15	2	8	54	103
12	Lucknow Lancers	20	2	18	0	4	38	123

=== Scoring leaders ===
Note: GP = Games played; G = Goals; A = Assists; Pts = Points; PIM = Penalty minutes

Player	Team	GP	G	A	Pts	PIM
Garrett Meurs	Ripley Wolves	19	26	14	40	26
Riley Cribbin	Minto 81's	19	19	18	37	22
Mike Siddall	Seaforth Centenaires	12	16	20	36	10
Sean Kienapple	Tavistock Royals	15	12	23	35	34
Miles MacLean	Saugeen Shores Winterhawks	19	17	16	33	10
Kyler Nixon	Durham Thundercats	20	6	26	32	46
Kurtis Bartliff	Seaforth Centenaires	14	13	17	30	0
Drew Gerth	Tavistock Royals	20	16	14	30	2
Dennis Dewar	Milverton Four Wheel Drives	19	12	16	28	6
Ethan Skinner	Ripley Wolves	13	11	16	27	10

== Playoffs ==
=== WOAA Senior "AA" Hockey playoffs ===
The top eight teams qualify for the WOAA Senior "AA" Hockey playoffs. Each series is a best-of-seven.

WOAA Sr. AA quarter-finals
1	Seaforth	4
8	Durham	0
4	Minto	2
5	Tavistock	4
2	Ripley	4
7	Petrolia	0
3	Saugeen Shores	4
6	Creemore	2

WOAA Sr. AA semi-finals
1	Seaforth	2
5	Tavistock	4
2	Ripley	4
3	Saugeen Shores	3

WOAA Sr. AA finals
5	Tavistock	4
2	Ripley	1

==== WOAA Senior AA quarter-finals ====
===== (1) Seaforth Centenaires vs. (8) Durham Thundercats =====
February 4	Durham Thundercats	0 – 5	Seaforth Centenaires	Seaforth Community Centre

February 10	Durham Thundercats	1 – 3	Seaforth Centenaires	Seaforth Community Centre

February 11	Seaforth Centenaires	2 – 0	Durham Thundercats	Durham Community Centre

February 17	Seaforth Centenaires	5 – 4	OT	Durham Thundercats	Durham Community Centre

Seaforth wins series 4 – 0

===== (2) Ripley Wolves vs. (7) Petrolia Squires =====
February 4	Ripley Wolves	6 – 1	Petrolia Squires	Greenwood Recreation Centre

February 5	Petrolia Squires	4 – 9	Ripley Wolves	Ripley-Huron Arena

February 10	Petrolia Squires	4 – 6	Ripley Wolves	Ripley-Huron Arena

February 17	Ripley Wolves	4 – 3	OT	Petrolia Squires	Greenwood Recreation Centre

Ripley wins series 4 – 0

===== (3) Saugeen Shores Winterhawks vs. (6) Creemore Coyotes =====
Note: Game six was played at the Southampton Coliseum in Southampton, Ontario.

February 4	Saugeen Shores Winterhawks	6 – 3	Creemore Coyotes	Creemore Recreation Centre

February 10	Creemore Coyotes	3 – 5	Saugeen Shores Winterhawks	Port Elgin Plex

February 11	Saugeen Shores Winterhawks	3 – 4	OT	Creemore Coyotes	Creemore Recreation Centre

February 17	Creemore Coyotes	2 – 5	Saugeen Shores Winterhawks	Port Elgin Plex

February 18	Saugeen Shores Winterhawks	5 – 6	OT	Creemore Coyotes	Creemore Recreation Centre

February 19	Creemore Coyotes	1 – 4	Saugeen Shores Winterhawks	Port Elgin Plex

Saugeen Shores wins series 4 – 2

===== (4) Minto 81's vs. (5) Tavistock Royals =====
February 4	Minto 81's	5 – 2	Tavistock Royals	Tavistock Recreation Centre

February 5	Tavistock Royals	3 – 2	Minto 81's	Palmerston Community Centre

February 10	Tavistock Royals	5 – 3	Minto 81's	Palmerston Community Centre

February 11	Minto 81's	4 – 2	Tavistock Royals	Tavistock Recreation Centre

February 12	Tavistock Royals	4 – 2	Minto 81's	Palmerston Community Centre

February 18	Minto 81's	0 – 7	Tavistock Royals	Tavistock Recreation Centre

Tavistock wins series 4 – 2

==== WOAA Senior AA semi-finals ====
===== (1) Seaforth Centenaires vs. (5) Tavistock Royals =====
February 24	Seaforth Centenaires	1 – 2	Tavistock Royals	Tavistock Recreation Centre

February 25	Tavistock Royals	1 – 2	Seaforth Centenaires	Seaforth Community Centre

March 4	Tavistock Royals	2 – 0	Seaforth Centenaires	Seaforth Community Centre

March 5	Seaforth Centenaires	3 – 2	Tavistock Royals	Tavistock Recreation Centre

March 10	Tavistock Royals	2 – 1	Seaforth Centenaires	Seaforth Community Centre

March 17	Seaforth Centenaires	4 – 5	OT	Tavistock Royals	Tavistock Recreation Centre

Tavistock wins series 4 – 2

===== (2) Ripley Wolves vs. (3) Saugeen Shores Winterhawks =====
February 24	Saugeen Shores Winterhawks	1 – 3	Ripley Wolves	Ripley-Huron Arena

February 25	Ripley Wolves	4 – 1	Saugeen Shores Winterhawks	Port Elgin Plex

March 3	Ripley Wolves	1 – 0	Saugeen Shores Winterhawks	Port Elgin Plex

March 4	Saugeen Shores Winterhawks	4 – 1	Ripley Wolves	Ripley-Huron Arena

March 10	Saugeen Shores Winterhawks	5 – 3	Ripley Wolves	Ripley-Huron Arena

March 11	Ripley Wolves	1 – 4	Saugeen Shores Winterhawks	Port Elgin Plex

March 14	Saugeen Shores Winterhawks	2 – 3	OT	Ripley Wolves	Ripley-Huron Arena

Ripley wins series 4 – 3

==== WOAA Sr. AA Championship ====
===== (2) Ripley Wolves vs. (5) Tavistock Royals =====
March 18	Tavistock Royals	6 – 2	Ripley Wolves	Ripley-Huron Arena

March 19	Ripley Wolves	3 – 4	OT	Tavistock Royals	Tavistock Recreation Centre

March 25	Tavistock Royals	4 – 6	Ripley Wolves	Ripley-Huron Arena

March 26	Ripley Wolves	3 – 4	OT	Tavistock Royals	Tavistock Recreation Centre

March 31	Ripley Wolves	6 – 4	Tavistock Royals	Tavistock Recreation Centre

Tavistock wins series 4 – 1

=== WOAA Senior "A" Hockey playoffs ===
The bottom four teams qualified for the WOAA Senior "A" Hockey playoffs. Each series is a best-of-seven.

WOAA Sr. A semi-finals
9	Shallow Lake	4
12	Lucknow	2
10	Milverton	4
11	Shelburne	3

WOAA Sr. A finals
9	Shallow Lake	2
10	Milverton	4

==== WOAA Senior A semi-finals ====
===== (9) Shallow Lake Crushers vs. (12) Lucknow Lancers =====
February 4	Lucknow Lancers	3 – 4	Shallow Lake Crushers	Shallow Lake Arena

February 5	Shallow Lake Crushers	6 – 4	Lucknow Lancers	Lucknow Arena

February 10	Lucknow Lancers	4 – 5	OT	Shallow Lake Crushers	Shallow Lake Arena

February 11	Shallow Lake Crushers	1 – 4	Lucknow Lancers	Lucknow Arena

February 17	Lucknow Lancers	6 – 1	Shallow Lake Crushers	Shallow Lake Arena

February 18	Shallow Lake Crushers	5 – 3	Lucknow Lancers	Lucknow Arena

Shallow Lake wins series 4 – 2

===== (10) Milverton Four Wheel Drives vs. (11) Shelburne Muskies =====
February 5	Shelburne Muskies	2 – 5	Milverton Four Wheel Drives	Perth East Recreational Complex

February 11	Milverton Four Wheel Drives	4 – 5	OT	Shelburne Muskies	Centre Dufferin Recreation Complex

February 12	Shelburne Muskies	1 – 2	Milverton Four Wheel Drives	Perth East Recreational Complex

February 17	Milverton Four Wheel Drives	3 – 8	Shelburne Muskies	Centre Dufferin Recreation Complex

February 18	Shelburne Muskies	1 – 5	Milverton Four Wheel Drives	Perth East Recreational Complex

February 19	Milverton Four Wheel Drives	1 – 5	Shelburne Muskies	Centre Dufferin Recreation Complex

February 21	Shelburne Muskies	1 – 4	Milverton Four Wheel Drives	Perth East Recreational Complex

Milverton wins series 4 – 3

==== WOAA Sr. A Championship ====
===== (9) Shallow Lake Crushers vs. (10) Milverton Four Wheel Drives =====
February 24	Milverton Four Wheel Drives	5 – 2	Shallow Lake Crushers	Shallow Lake Arena

March 3	Milverton Four Wheel Drives	2 – 5	Shallow Lake Crushers	Shallow Lake Arena

March 5	Shallow Lake Crushers	1 – 5	Milverton Four Wheel Drives	Perth East Recreational Complex

March 12	Shallow Lake Crushers	9 – 7	Milverton Four Wheel Drives	Perth East Recreational Complex

March 17	Milverton Four Wheel Drives	3 – 2	OT	Shallow Lake Crushers	Shallow Lake Arena

March 18	Shallow Lake Crushers	1 – 4	Milverton Four Wheel Drives	Perth East Recreational Complex

Milverton wins series 4 – 2
