= Ridgetown Rebels =

Canadian hockey team

- City: Ridgetown, Ontario, Canada
- League: Ontario Elite Hockey League
- Home arena: East Kent Memorial Arena
- Colours: Red, Blue and White
- General manager: Adam Trudgen
- Head coach: Shawn Simpson

The Ridgetown Rebels are a senior hockey team based out of Ridgetwon, Ontario, Canada. They play in the Ontario Elite Hockey League.

== History ==
On June 26, 2026, the Ontario Elite Hockey League announced that the Rebels were approved as an expansion team and will join the OEHL for the 2026–27 season.

== Related links ==
- Ridgetown, Ontario
- Ontario Elite Hockey League
