= 2023–24 OEHL season =

- League: Ontario Elite Hockey League
- Sport: Hockey
- Duration: Regular season October 6, 2023 – February 4, 2024; Playoffs; February 9, 2024 – March 30, 2024
- Teams: 11
- Finals champions: OEHL Cup - Minto 81's Hugh McLean Trophy - Georgian Bay Applekings

OEHL seasons
- 2022–23 2024–25

The 2023–24 OEHL season was the first season of the Ontario Elite Hockey League. The league played a 20-game regular season which began in October 2023 and concluded in February 2024. The post-season began in February 2024 and concluded in March 2024.

The Minto 81's won the OEHL Cup Championship, defeating the Tavistock Royals in the final round of the playoffs.

== Formation of OEHL ==
The Ontario Elite Hockey League (OEHL) was established on August 17, 2023, by the Ontario Hockey Association. The league took ten members of the WOAA Senior AA Hockey League, plus one pending expansion team, as well as another team as being formed in the announcement for the formation of a new league.

The ten former WOAA teams were the Creemore Coyotes, Durham Thundercats, Lucknow Lancers, Milverton Four Wheel Drives, Minto 81's, Ripley Wolves, Saugeen Shores Winterhawks, Seaforth Centenaires, Shelburne Muskies and Tavistock Royals. The expansion team brought from the WOAA was the Georgian Bay Applekings. The Erin Outlaws were also announced as a new team to the league.

The Shelburne Muskies took a leave of absence for the 2023–24 season.

== Regular season ==
=== Final standings ===
Note: GP = Games played; W = Wins; L= Losses; OTL = Overtime losses; GF = Goals for; GA = Goals against; Pts = Points; Green shade = Clinched playoff spot

Rank	Ontario Elite Hockey League	GP	W	L	OTL	Pts	GF	GA
1	Ripley Wolves	20	16	1	3	35	107	53
2	Creemore Coyotes	20	14	5	1	29	99	66
3	Minto 81's	20	13	6	1	27	97	69
4	Tavistock Royals	20	13	7	0	26	87	69
5	Durham Thundercats	20	12	7	1	25	83	73
6	Seaforth Centenaires	20	12	8	0	24	82	52
7	Saugeen Shores Winterhawks	20	11	8	1	23	78	54
8	Erin Outlaws	20	6	13	1	13	71	104
9	Georgian Bay Applekings	20	5	13	2	12	59	108
10	Milverton Four Wheel Drives	20	5	14	1	11	66	105
11	Lucknow Lancers	20	3	16	1	7	42	118

=== Scoring leaders ===
Note: GP = Games played; G = Goals; A = Assists; Pts = Points; PIM = Penalty minutes

Player	Team	GP	G	A	Pts	PIM
Garrett Meurs	Ripley Wolves	19	17	27	44	36
Luke Richardson	Durham Thundercats	20	14	25	39	0
Kyler Nixon	Durham Thundercats	19	13	26	39	2
JD Falconer	Creemore Coyotes	19	11	28	39	6
Ben Hughes	Creemore Coyotes	20	18	17	35	6
Kaden Hoggarth	Ripley Wolves	19	11	17	28	46
Sean Kienapple	Tavistock Royals	17	14	13	27	14
Dennis Dewar	Milverton Four Wheel Drives	19	16	10	26	2
Dan Nicoloff	Ripley Wolves	16	13	13	26	28
Caleb Warren	Minto 81's	19	11	15	26	16

=== Leading goaltenders ===
Note: GP = Games played; Mins = Minutes played; W = Wins; L = Losses: OTL = Overtime losses;
SL = Shootout losses; GA = Goals Allowed; SO = Shutouts; GAA = Goals against average

Player	Team	GP	MINS	W	L	OTL	GA	SO	Sv%	GAA
Alex Hutcheson	Seaforth Centenaires	10	557	5	4	0	18	0	0.897	1.94
Clayton Fritsch	Saugeen Shores Winterhawks	7	400	4	2	0	15	1	0.899	2.25
Josh Hamilton	Ripley Wolves	18	1094	14	3	1	46	4	0.909	2.52
Daniel DeKoening	Minto 81's	8	480	6	2	0	21	1	0.879	2.63
Malcolm Young	Durham Thundercats	6	361	5	1	0	16	0	0.920	2.66

== Playoffs ==
=== OEHL Cup playoffs ===
The top eight teams qualify for the OEHL Cup playoffs. Each series is a best-of-seven.

OEHL quarter-finals
1	Ripley	4
8	Erin	0
4	Tavistock	4
5	Durham	1
2	Creemore	4
7	Saugeen Shores	3
3	Minto	4
6	Seaforth	2

OEHL semi-finals
1	Ripley	2
4	Tavistock	4
2	Creemore	1
3	Minto	4

OEHL finals
4	Tavistock	0
3	Minto	4

==== OEHL quarter-finals ====
===== (1) Ripley Wolves vs. (8) Erin Outlaws =====
February 9	Erin Outlaws	3 – 7	Ripley Wolves	Ripley-Huron Arena	Recap
Brad Holman (1) - 14:52		First period	7:36 - Dylan Sayle (1)
Jacob Miller (1) - sh - 3:06		Second period	11:18 - Kaden Hoggarth (1); 7:27 - Alex Kuntz (1)
Chris Lachance (1) - pp - 12:08		Third period	16:33 - Dan Nicoloff (1); 16:11 - Ethan Skinner (1); 11:03 - Garrett Meurs (1); 1:47 - en - Brett Catto (1)
Jake Lawr (0-1, 40 saves / 46 shots)		Goalie stats	Jason Hamilton (1-0, 25 saves / 28 shots)

February 10	Ripley Wolves	5 – 3	Erin Outlaws	Erin Community Centre	Recap
Dan Nicoloff (2) - pp - 6:23		First period	No scoring
No scoring		Second period	9:33 - pp - Jacob Miller (2)
Mike Howes (1) - 10:15; Garrett Meurs (2) - 9:23; Ethan Skinner (2) - 5:25; Cody Britton (1) - 1:46		Third period	9:14 - Travis Brown (1); 0:06 - pp - Travis Brown (2)
Jason Hamilton (2-0, 32 saves / 35 shots)		Goalie stats	Jake Lawr (0-2, 27 saves / 32 shots)

February 16	Erin Outlaws	1 – 6	Ripley Wolves	Ripley-Huron Arena	Recap
No scoring		First period	16:40 - Garrett Meurs (3); 15:00 - Jakob Reeves (1); 12:21 - Garrett Meurs (4); 8:53 - pp - Nick Seiler (1); 6:00 - Tyson Soers (1)
No scoring		Second period	No scoring
Jacob Miller (3) - 18:59		Third period	6:20 - Ethan Skinner (3)
Connor Toogood (0-1, 5 saves / 8 shots); Jacob Tugnutt (31 saves / 34 shots)		Goalie stats	Jason Hamilton (3-0, 32 saves / 35 shots)

February 17	Ripley Wolves	11 – 2	Erin Outlaws	Erin Community Centre	Recap
Gerrit Satosek (1) - 19:19; Dan Nicoloff (3) - 14:21; Garrett Meurs (5) - 9:38; Jarred Colling (1) - 9:17		First period	2:33 - Travis Brown (3)
Dan Nicoloff (4) - pp - 18:49; Cody Britton (2) - 14:33; Garrett Meurs (6) - 10:28		Second period	4:26 - sh - Travis Brown (4)
Dan Nicoloff (5) - pp - 17:06; Jakob Reeves (2) - 11:52; Jarred Colling (2) - 7:57; Kaden Hoggarth (2) - 3:25		Third period	No scoring
Jason Hamilton (4-0, 32 saves / 35 shots)		Goalie stats	Jacob Tugnutt (0-1, 22 saves / 33 shots)

Ripley wins series 4 – 0

===== (2) Creemore Coyotes vs. (7) Saugeen Shores Winterhawks =====
Note: Game seven was played at the Centre Dufferin Recreation Complex in Shelburne, Ontario.

February 9	Creemore Coyotes	1 – 6	Saugeen Shores Winterhawks	Port Elgin Plex	Recap
No scoring		First period	17:51 - Lauchlin Elder (1); 12:22 - Chad Jones (1)
Nick Sammons (1) - 0:01		Second period	19:18 - Dan Zweep (1); 5:09 - Curtis Johnston (1); 3:49 - Lauchlin Elder (2)
No scoring		Third period	19:13 - Lauchlin Elder (3)
Mason Kameka (0-1, 39 saves / 45 shots)		Goalie stats	Jeff Flagler (1-0, 28 saves / 29 shots)

February 10	Saugeen Shores Winterhawks	2 – 1	OT	Creemore Coyotes	Creemore Recreation Centre	Recap
Dan Zweep (2) - 7:28		First period		10:04 - Anthony Novielli (1)
No scoring		Second period		No scoring
No scoring		Third period		No scoring
Chad Jones (2) - pp - 5:50		First overtime period		No scoring
Clayton Fritsch (1-0)		Goalie stats		Mason Kameka (0-2)

February 16	Creemore Coyotes	6 – 4	Saugeen Shores Winterhawks	Port Elgin Plex	Recap
JD Falconer (1) - pp - 2:11; Ben Hughes (1) - 1:01		First period	13:17 - pp - Miles MacLean (1); 12:04 - Luke Pither - (1); 10:12 - Trevor Smith (1); 4:09 - Dan Zweep (3)
Ben Hughes (2) - 15:24; Nick Sammons (2) - sh - 9:37; Kyle Linney (1) - 4:55		Second period	No scoring
Ben Hughes (3) - 0:33		Third period	No scoring
Mason Kameka (1-2, 33 saves / 37 shots)		Goalie stats	Jeff Flagler (1-1, 21 saves / 27 shots)

February 17	Saugeen Shores Winterhawks	1 – 3	Creemore Coyotes	Creemore Recreation Centre	Recap
No scoring		First period	No scoring
No scoring		Second period	9:29 - pp - JD Falconer (2)
Miles MacLean (2) - pp - 11:57		Third period	19:39 - pp - Jordan Taylor (1); 17:56 - Owen King (1)
Clayton Fritsch (1-1)		Goalie stats	Mason Kameka (2-2)

February 18	Saugeen Shores Winterhawks	2 – 5	Creemore Coyotes	Creemore Recreation Centre	Recap
No scoring		First period	14:10 - pp - Kris Dobinson (1)
Miles MacLean (3) - 15:16		Second period	13:09 - sh - Ben Hughes (4); 3:49 - Ben Hughes (5)
Logan Freiburger (1) - pp - 15:16		Third period	7:05 - JD Falconer (3); 0:31 - Derick Robertson (1)
Jeff Flagler (1-2)		Goalie stats	Mason Kameka (3-2)

February 23	Creemore Coyotes	2 – 6	Saugeen Shores Winterhawks	Port Elgin Plex	Recap
JD Falconer (4) - pp - 15:17; Jordan Taylor (2) - pp - 6:58		First period	19:22 - Dan Zweep (4) - 19:22; 11:19 - pp - Justin Donnelly (1)
No scoring		Second period	8:50 - Logan Freiburger (2); 0:02 - Andy Fracz (1)
No scoring		Third period	19:52 - Andy Mitchell (1); 18:41 - Trent Hawke (1)
Mason Kameka (3-3, 23 saves / 29 shots)		Goalie stats	Clayton Fritsch (2-1, 34 saves / 36 shots)

February 24	Saugeen Shores Winterhawks	2 – 6	Creemore Coyotes	Creemore Recreation Centre	Recap
No scoring		First period	No scoring
Luke Pither (2) - 15:33		Second period	12:59 - Kris Dobinson (2); 7:41 - Daniel Atkinson (1); 3:39 - Jacob Vander Zaag (1)
Chad Jones (3) - pp - 18:12		Third period	16:59 - Ben Hughes (6); 2:09 - en - Jacob Vander Zaag (2); 0:28 - en - Trevor Franklin (1)
Clayton Fritsch (2-2)		Goalie stats	Mason Kameka (4-3)

Creemore wins series 4 – 3

===== (3) Minto 81's vs. (6) Seaforth Centenaires =====
February 9	Seaforth Centenaires	3 – 5	Minto 81's	Palmerston Community Centre	Recap
Jamie Huber (1) - 11:54		First period	4:47 - Riley Cribbin (1)
Ray Huether (1) - 17:23		Second period	16:28 - Adam Kawalec (1); 11:32 - pp - Adam Kawalec (2)
Drew Gross (1) - 8:08		Third period	16:29 - Klayton Hoelscher (1); 0:40 - en - Blair Butchart (1)
Alex Hutcheson (0-1)		Goalie stats	Daniel Dekoening (1-0); Thomas Gainer

February 10	Minto 81's	5 – 4	OT	Seaforth Centenaires	Seaforth Community Centre	Recap
Kyle Heintzner (1) - pp - 19:14; Kyle Heintzner (2) - 16:39		First period		1:25 - pp - Carter Collinson (1); 1:06 - pp - Sheldon Pryce (1)
Adam Kawalec (3) - pp - 6:00		Second period		18:32 - Holdyn Lansink (1); 0:54 - pp- Drew Gross (2)
Jordan Delaurier (1) - pp - 2:28		Third period		No scoring
Riley Cribbin (2) - pp - 5:25		First overtime period		No scoring
Daniel Dekoening (2-0, 40 saves / 44 shots)		Goalie stats		Tyler Parr (0-1, 36 saves / 41 shots)

February 17	Seaforth Centenaires	3 – 6	Minto 81's	Palmerston Community Centre	Recap
Drew Gross (3) - 17:25		First period	No scoring
Jarrett Bogdon (1) - 16:05; Jarrett Bogdon (2) - 11:18		Second period	15:27 - Klayton Hoelscher (2); 13:36 - Cole Pellett (1); 2:24 - Riley Cribbin (3)
No scoring		Third period	19:16 - Kyle Heintzner (3); 11:33 - pp - Blair Butchart (2); 0:03 - Klayton Hoelscher (3)
Alex Hutcheson (0-2)		Goalie stats	Mark Williams (1-0)

February 18	Minto 81's	2 – 5	Seaforth Centenaires	Seaforth Community Centre	Recap
No scoring		First period	1:20 - Kyle Stanbury (1)
Klayton Hoelscher (4) - 17:57		Second period	13:33 - sh - Parker Gibbings (1); 9:21 - pp - Malcolm McLeod (1)
Cole Pellett (2) - 7:48		Third period	1:14 - Mike Siddall (1); 0:07 - sh - Mike Siddall (2)
Mark Williams (1-1, 16 saves / 21 shots)		Goalie stats	Tyler Parr (1-1, 31 saves / 33 shots)

February 19	Seaforth Centenaires	4 – 3	Minto 81's	Palmerston Community Centre	Recap
No scoring		First period	No scoring
Jarrett Bogdon (3) - 17:47; Kyle Stanbury (2) - 11:19; Jamie Huber (2) - pp - 3:26		Second period	11:49 - pp - Caleb Warren (1); 2:37 - sh - Blake Nichol (1)
Mike Siddall (3) - 12:55		Third period	10:10 - Kyle Heintzer (3)
Tyler Parr (2-1, 30 saves / 33 shots)		Goalie stats	Daniel Dekoening (2-1, 21 saves / 25 shots)

February 24	Minto 81's	4 – 3	Seaforth Centenaires	Seaforth Community Centre	Recap
Jordan Delaurier (2) - pp - 4:25		First period	3:07 - Brady Wiffen (1)
Klayton Hoelscher (5) - 18:06; Blake Nichol (2) - pp - 8:52		Second period	18:45 - Kyle Stanbury (3)
Jacob McEachern (1) - 0:44		Third period	5:39 - pp - Brady Wiffen (2)
Mark Williams (2-1, 34 saves / 37 shots)		Goalie stats	Tyler Parr (2-2, 21 saves / 25 shots)

Minto wins series 4 – 2

===== (4) Tavistock Royals vs. (5) Durham Thundercats =====
February 9	Tavistock Royals	3 – 2	Durham Thundercats	Durham Community Centre	Recap
Jarret Woon Sam (1) - pp - 15:45		First period	14:03 - Lucas Bast (1)
Deven Kropf (1) - pp - 15:48		Second period	No scoring
Erik Robichaud (1) - sh - 18:40		Third period	12:44 - pp - Luke Richardson (1)
Jensen Van Boekel (1-0, 37 saves / 39 shots)		Goalie stats	Malcolm Young (0-1, 30 saves / 33 shots)

February 11	Durham Thundercats	3 – 2	OT	Tavistock Royals	Tavistock Recreation Centre	Recap
No scoring		First period		6:29 - Drew Gerth (1)
Riley O'Connell (1) - pp - 14:44		Second period		No scoring
Kyler Nixon (1) - pp - 13:09		Third period		5:59 - pp - Geoff Killing (1)
Riley O'Connell (2) - pp - 3:52		First overtime period		No scoring
Brendan Landry (1-0, 46 saves / 48 shots)		Goalie stats		Jensen Van Boekel (1-1, 33 saves / 36 shots)

February 16	Tavistock Royals	4 – 0	Durham Thundercats	Durham Community Centre	Recap
Callan Christner (1) - pp - 16:32		First period	No scoring
Tristan Hohl (1) - 11:02		Second period	No scoring
Geoff Killing (2) - 19:08; Collin Hartwick (1) - 16:46		Third period	No scoring
Jensen Van Boekel (2-1, 29 saves / 29 shots)		Goalie stats	Brendan Landry (1-1, 20 saves / 23 shots); Malcolm Young (3 saves / 4 shots)

February 17	Durham Thundercats	2 – 7	Tavistock Royals	Tavistock Recreation Centre	Recap
No scoring		First period	8:25 - sh - Trevor Sauder (1)
Justin Graham (1) - 2:01		Second period	17:25 - Drew Gerth (2); 15:13 - pp - Sean Kienapple (1)
Luke Richardson (2) - pp - 5:22		Third period	18:49 - Callan Christner (2); 17:29 - sh - Jeremy Munro (1); 13:59 - en - Sean Leslie (1); 5:09 - Matt Zilke (1)
Brendan Landry (1-2, 41 saves / 47 shots)		Goalie stats	Jensen Van Boekel (3-1, 20 saves / 22 shots)

February 23	Durham Thundercats	3 – 5	Tavistock Royals	Tavistock Recreation Centre	Recap
Cody Brown (1) - pp - 2:42		First period	No scoring
No scoring		Second period	6:59 - Trevor Sauder (2); 4:11 - Jeremy Munro (2)
Riley O'Connell (3) - 17:55; Alex Paylor (1) - 5:55		Third period	19:05 - Sean Kienapple (2); 8:52 - Callan Christner (3); 0:57 - en - Trevor Sauder (3)
Brendan Landry (1-3)		Goalie stats	Jensen Van Boekel (4-1)

Tavistock wins series 4 – 1

==== OEHL semi-finals ====
===== (1) Ripley Wolves vs. (4) Tavistock Royals =====
March 2	Tavistock Royals	4 – 3	OT	Ripley Wolves	Ripley-Huron Arena	Recap
No scoring		First period		No scoring
Mike Noyes (1) - pp - 12:14; Erik Robichaud (2) - 9:16		Second period		5:23 - sh - Ethan Skinner (4); 0:22 - pp - Ethan Skinner (5)
Drew Gerth (3) - pp - 0:40		Third period		5:40 - Garrett Meurs (7)
Deven Kropf (2) - pp - 13:29		First overtime period		No scoring
Jensen Van Boekel (5-1, 24 saves / 27 shots)		Goalie stats		Jacob Abbott (0-1, 35 saves / 39 shots)

March 3	Ripley Wolves	5 – 9	Tavistock Royals	Tavistock Recreation Centre	Recap
No scoring		First period	18:49 - Drew Gerth (4); 16:25 - Jon Jutzi (1); 14:39 - pp - Geoff Killing (3)
Jarred Colling (3) - sh - 15:51; Garrett Meurs (8) - 8:57; Brett Catto (2) - pp - 2:37		Second period	13:52 - pp - Jon Jutzi (2); 7:54 - Matt Zilke (2)
Pat Looby (1) - pp - 11:25; Brett Catto (3) - pp - 9:00		Third period	17:49 - pp - Drew Gerth (5); 13:29 - Erik Robichaud (3); 10:53 - Callan Christner (4); 3:38 - Trevor Sauder (4)
Jason Hamilton (4-1, 19 saves / 28 shots)		Goalie stats	Jensen Van Boekel (6-1, 30 saves / 35 shots)

March 9	Tavistock Royals	8 – 4	Ripley Wolves	Ripley-Huron Arena	Recap
Matt Zilke (3) - 16:49; Collin Hartwick (2) - 16:19; Drew Gerth (6) - 15:22; Erik Robichaud (4) - pp - 10:05		First period	No scoring
Drew Gerth (7) - 5:03; Matt Zilke (4) - 1:29; Drew Gerth (8) - 0:28		Second period	10:51 - pp - Dan Nicoloff (6); 10:12 - Jakob Reeves (2); 0:05 - Pat Looby (2)
Jon Jutzi (3) - sh - en - 0:43		Third period	5:15 - Dan Nicoloff (7)
Jensen Van Boekel (7-1, 37 saves / 41 shots)		Goalie stats	Jacob Abbott (0-2, 9 saves / 12 shots); Jason Hamilton (12 saves / 16 shots)

March 10	Ripley Wolves	4 – 1	Tavistock Royals	Tavistock Recreation Centre	Recap
Garrett Meurs (9) - pp - 1:12		First period	No scoring
Evan Visser (1) - 16:19		Second period	9:33 - Drew Gerth (9)
Evan Visser (2) - 13:53; Garrett Meurs (10) - pp - 9:15		Third period	No scoring
Jason Hamilton (5-1, 23 saves / 24 shots)		Goalie stats	Jensen Van Boekel (7-2, 12 saves / 16 shots)

March 16	Tavistock Royals	5 – 6	2OT	Ripley Wolves	Ripley-Huron Arena	Recap
Deven Kropf (3) - 1:39		First period		11:11 - pp - Kaden Hoggarth (3); 7:10 - Dan Nicoloff (8); 4:29 - pp - Kaden Hoggarth (4)
Drew Gerth (10) - 17:46; Deven Kropf (4) - 16:58; Jon Jutzi (4) - 3:15		Second period		12:24 - Dan Nicoloff (9)
Drew Gerth (11) - pp - 13:37		Third period		8:09 - pp - Cody Britton (3)
No scoring		Second overtime period		14:00 - Garrett Meurs (11)
Jensen Van Boekel (7-3, 52 saves / 58 shots)		Goalie stats		Jason Hamilton (6-1, 56 saves / 61 shots)

March 17	Ripley Wolves	2 – 5	Tavistock Royals	Tavistock Recreation Centre	Recap
Pat Looby (3) - 2:52		First period	1:09 - pp - Erik Robichaud (5)
Jakob Reeves (4) - 16:47		Second period	18:37 - Mike Noyes (2)
No scoring		Third period	12:35 - pp - Greg Noyes (1); 10:12 - Tristan Hohl (2); 0:47 - pp - Jeremy Munro (3)
Jason Hamilton (6-2, 30 saves / 35 shots)		Goalie stats	Jensen Van Boekel (8-3, 21 saves / 23 shots)

Tavistock wins series 4 – 2

===== (2) Creemore Coyotes vs. (3) Minto 81's =====
March 2	Minto 81's	3 – 0	Creemore Coyotes	Creemore Recreation Centre	Recap
Blake Nichol (3) - 5:46		First period	No scoring
Ryan Maksymyk (1) - 16:45		Second period	No scoring
Kyle Heintzner (5) - 18:53		Third period	No scoring
Daniel Dekoening (3-1)		Goalie stats	Mason Kameka (4-4)

March 9	Minto 81's	2 – 6	Creemore Coyotes	Creemore Recreation Centre	Recap
Steven Grant (1) - 12:10		First period	No scoring
No scoring		Second period	10:38 - Owen King (2); 4:50 - Adam Logozzo (1)
Steven Grant (2) - 18:30		Third period	17:10 - Jacob Vander Zaag (3); 12:35 - JD Falconer (5); 11:26 - sh - JD Falconer (6); 7:24 - Anthony Novielli (2)
Daniel Dekoening (3-2)		Goalie stats	Brendan Macham; Mason Kameka (5-4)

March 10	Creemore Coyotes	2 – 10	Minto 81's	Palmerston Community Centre	Recap
No scoring		First period	19:49 - Adam Kawalec (4); 19:35 - Jordan Delaurier (3); 17:20 - Jordan Delaurier (4); 16:52 - Jordan Delaurier (5); 5:49 - Adam Kawalec (5); 4:05 - Riley Cribbin (4)
No scoring		Second period	10:04 - Riley Cribbin (5); 9:32 - pp - Caleb Warren (2); 7:32 - pp - Blair Butchart (3); 5:20 - Cole Pellett (3)
Ben Hughes (7) - 15:22; Jacob Vander Zaag (4) - sh - 2:33		Third period	No scoring
Brendan Macham (0-1)		Goalie stats	Mark Williams (3-1)

March 15	Creemore Coyotes	1 – 6	Minto 81's	Palmerston Community Centre	Recap
Ben Hughes (8) - 19:17		First period	0:01 - pp - Adam Kawalec (6)
No scoring		Second period	14:15 - Jordan Delaurier (6); 9:30 - Kyle Heintzner (6); 1:12 - Klayton Hoelscher (6)
No scoring		Third period	No scoring
Mason Kameka (5-5)		Goalie stats	Mark Williams (4-1)

March 16	Minto 81's	7 – 1	Creemore Coyotes	Creemore Recreation Centre	Recap
Jordan Delaurier (7) - 16:29; Klayton Hoelscher (7) - pp - 10:31; Owen Torrie (1) - 5:21		First period	18:09 - JD Falconer (7)
Blair Butchart (4) - pp - 13:10; Klayton Hoelscher (8) - 3:16		Second period	No scoring
Klayton Hoelscher (9) - 10:57; Kyle Heintzner (7) - 4:47		Third period	No scoring
Mark Williams (5-1)		Goalie stats	Mason Kameka (5-6)

Minto wins series 4 – 1

==== OEHL Cup finals ====
===== (3) Minto 81's vs. (4) Tavistock Royals =====
March 23	Minto 81's	3 – 1	Tavistock Royals	Tavistock Recreation Centre	Recap
Shawn Lantz (1) - pp - 0:22		First period	No scoring
Jacob McEachern (2) - pp - 7:23		Second period	2:22 - pp - Sean Kienapple (3)
Klayton Hoelscher (10) - 19:31		Third period	No scoring
Mark Williams (6-1, 44 saves / 45 shots)		Goalie stats	Jensen Van Boekel (8-4, 19 saves / 22 shots)

March 24	Tavistock Royals	5 – 6	Minto 81's	Palmerston Community Centre	Recap
Matt Zilke (5) - 17:04; Jeremy Munro (4) - sh - 10:48		First period	12:53 - pp - Kyle Heintzner (8); 4:18 - Cole Pellett (5)
No scoring		Second period	8:36 - pp - Jordan Delaurier (8); 2:48 - Riley Cribbin (6); 0:55 - Adam Kawalec (7); 0:21 - Jacob McEachern (3)
Geoff Killing (4) - pp - 19:10; Geoff Killing (5) - pp - 18:19; Deven Kropf (5) - sh - 4:46		Third period	No scoring
Jensen Van Boekel (8-5)		Goalie stats	Mark Williams (7-1)

March 29	Tavistock Royals	3 – 4	OT	Minto 81's	Palmerston Community Centre	Recap
Drew Gerth (12) - 0:31		First period		5:05 - Brenden Clayton (1); 4:31 - Caleb Warren (3)
Callan Christner (5) - pp - 11:48		Second period		12:41 - Blair Butchart (5)
Deven Kropf (6) - 1:52		Third period		No scoring
No scoring		First overtime period		16:56 - Adam Kawalec (8)
Jensen Van Boekel (8-6)		Goalie stats		Mark Williams (8-1)

March 30	Minto 81's	5 – 2	Tavistock Royals	Tavistock Recreation Centre	Recap
Riley Cribbin (7) - 17:24		First period	No scoring
Riley Cribbin (8) - 17:35; Riley Cribbin (9) - 7:10		Second period	No scoring
Riley Cribbin (10) - 8:47; Jacob McEachern (4) - 0:31		Third period	13:48 - Sean Kienapple (4); 4:12 - Sean Kienapple (5)
Mark Williams (9-1, 37 saves / 39 shots)		Goalie stats	Jensen Van Boekel (8-7, 28 saves / 33 shots)

Minto wins series 4 – 0

=== OEHL Cup scoring leaders ===
Note: GP = Games played; G = Goals; A = Assists; Pts = Points; PIM = Penalty minutes

Player	Team	GP	G	A	Pts	PIM
Riley Cribbin	Minto 81's	14	10	12	22	10
Drew Gerth	Tavistock Royals	15	12	9	21	12
Dan Nicoloff	Ripley Wolves	10	9	10	19	2
Adam Kawalec	Minto 81's	13	8	10	18	6
JD Falconer	Creemore Coyotes	12	7	11	18	6
Garrett Meurs	Ripley Wolves	10	11	7	18	20
Erik Robichaud	Tavistock Royals	15	5	13	18	8
Klayton Hoelscher	Minto 81's	12	10	6	16	4
Sean Kienapple	Tavistock Royals	15	5	11	16	12
Jordan Delaurier	Minto 81's	14	8	7	15	2

=== OEHL Cup leading goaltenders ===
Note: GP = Games played; Mins = Minutes played; W = Wins; L = Losses: OTL = Overtime losses;
SL = Shootout losses; GA = Goals Allowed; SO = Shutouts; GAA = Goals against average

Player	Team	GP	MINS	W	L	GA	SO	GAA
Mark Williams	Minto 81's	10	603	9	1	26	0	2.59
Daniel Dekoening	Minto 81's	5	313	3	2	17	1	3.26
Tyler Parr	Seaforth Centenaires	4	254	2	2	14	0	3.31
Jensen Van Boekel	Tavistock Royals	15	931	8	7	52	1	3.35
Mason Kameka	Creemore Coyotes	11	653	5	6	40	0	3.68

=== Hugh McLean Trophy playoffs ===
The non-OEHL Cup playoff qualifiers played in a home and home round robin with the top two teams in the round robin advancing to the best-of-seven McLean Trophy championship series.

==== Round robin ====
Note: GP = Games played; W = Wins; L= Losses GF = Goals for; GA = Goals against; Pts = Points; Green shade = Clinched championship series berth

McLean Cup round robin	GP	W	L	Pts	GF	GA
Georgian Bay Applekings	4	4	0	8	28	14
Milverton Four Wheel Drives	4	1	3	2	22	24
Lucknow Lancers	4	1	3	2	13	25

===== Round robin scores =====
====== Lucknow Lancers at Georgian Bay Applekings ======
February 9	Lucknow Lancers	2 – 7	Georgian Bay Applekings	Beaver Valley Community Centre	Recap
No scoring		First period	No scoring
Tyler Medd (1) - 7:04		Second period	9:22 - Dean Martin (1); 5:50 - pp - Jacob Robitaille (1); 2:23 - Jack Underhill (1); 1:05 - Jamie Wise (1)
Trent Michie (1) - 19:48		Third period	7:48 - Kevin Shuttleworth (1); 6:45 - pp - Jamie Wise (2); 3:41 - Jamie Wise (3)
Branden Bean (0-1, 32 saves / 39 shots)		Goalie stats	Allan Menary (1-0, 25 saves / 27 shots)

====== Milverton Four Wheel Drives at Georgian Bay Applekings ======
February 10	Milverton Four Wheel Drives	2 – 5	Georgian Bay Applekings	Beaver Valley Community Centre	Recap
Mitch Boertien (1) - 1:35		First period	No scoring
Liam Buckley (1) - pp - 8:56		Second period	12:32 - Jack Underhill (2); 11:52 - Mackenzie Fleming (1); 3:49 - sh - Mitchell Good (1)
No scoring		Third period	5:26 - Logan Blaser (1); 1:53 - sh - Mackenzie Fleming (2)
Tyler Fassl (0-1)		Goalie stats	Allan Menary (2-0)

====== Georgian Bay Applekings at Lucknow Lancers ======
February 17	Georgian Bay Applekings	5 – 3	Lucknow Lancers	Lucknow Arena	Recap
Noah Rowland (1) - 12:25; Mitchell Good (2) - 5:38		First period	6:42 - pp - Tyler Medd (2)
Reid Simmons (1) - 16:55		Second period	No scoring
Dean Martin (2) - pp - 10:06; Mackenzie Fleming (3) - 2:20		Third period	8:49 - pp - Tanner Stevenson (1); 7:11 - Clayton Siertsema (1)
Allan Menary (3-0)		Goalie stats	Liam McCarthy (0-1)

====== Georgian Bay Applekings at Milverton Four Wheel Drives ======
February 18	Georgian Bay Applekings	11 – 7	Milverton Four Wheel Drives	Perth East Recreational Complex	Recap
Austin Russell (1) - 12:59; Trenton Micks (1) - 12:37; Michael Redick (1) - 7:32		First period	10:25 - Riley Connors (1); 2:36 - Erik Vander Eyk (1)
Logan Blaser (2) - 8:07; Neal Ross (1) - 6:44; Kevin Shuttleworth (2) - 6:01; Reid Simmons (2) - 4:08; Mackenzie Fleming (4) - sh - 3:03; Mackenzie Fleming (5) - 0:42		Second period	16:22 - Colton Quipp (1); 4:13 - pp - Riley Connors (2); 0:07 - Colton Quipp (2)
Michael Redick (2) - 11:25; Evan Buehler (1) - 3:07		Third period	13:58 - Dennis Dewar (1); 1:49 - pp - Colton Quipp (3)
Zachery Mather (1-0)		Goalie stats	Tyler Fassl (0-2)

====== Milverton Four Wheel Drives at Lucknow Lancers ======
February 23	Milverton Four Wheel Drives	3 – 5	Lucknow Lancers	Lucknow Arena	Recap
Jeff Fritzley (1) - 10:34; Jeff Fritzley (2) - 6:20; Curtis Rawn (1) - 2:13		First period	7:15 - Trent Michie (2)
No scoring		Second period	3:42 - Tanner Stevenson (2); 2:55 - Tyler Medd (3)
No scoring		Third period	12:12 - pp - Mitch Kuik (1); 0:22 - Mike Johnstone (1)
Tim Bester (0-1, 32 saves / 37 shots)		Goalie stats	Liam McCarthy (1-1, 25 saves / 28 shots)

====== Lucknow Lancers at Milverton Four Wheel Drives ======
February 24	Lucknow Lancers	3 – 10	Milverton Four Wheel Drives	Perth East Recreational Complex	Recap
Tyler Medd (4) - 19:44; Curtis Jackson (1) - 6:37		First period	8:33 - Chris Corbett (1); 7:05 - Mitch Boertien (2); 3:33 - Reid Swartzentruber (1)
Tyler Medd (5) - 16:46		Second period	18:24 - pp - Curtis Rawn (2); 1:51 - Curtis Rawn (3)
No scoring		Third period	18:22 - Colton Quipp (4); 16:42 - Dennis Dewar (2); 11:45 - Jeff Fritzley (3); 6:20 - sh - Chris Corbett (2); 4:28 - Reid Swartzentruber (2)
Liam McCarthy (1-2)		Goalie stats	Tim Bester (1-1)

==== Hugh McLean Trophy finals ====
===== (1) Georgian Bay Applekings vs. (2) Milverton Four Wheel Drives =====
Note: Game seven was played at the Meaford & St. Vincent Community Centre in Meaford, Ontario.

March 2	Georgian Bay Applekings	4 – 7	Milverton Four Wheel Drives	Perth East Recreational Complex	Recap
Kevin Shuttleworth (3) - 2:12; Neal Ross (2) - 1:32		First period	8:05 - Kody Langlois (1); 7:53 - Chris Corbett (3); 0:46 - Mitch Boertien (3)
Trenton Micks (2) - 6:04		Second period	10:41 - sh - Mitch Boertien (4)
Neal Ross (3) - sh - 0:44		Third period	18:36 - Dennis Dewar (3); 15:46 - Reese Stanley (1); 10:20 - sh - Chris Corbett (4)
Allan Menary (3-1)		Goalie stats	Tyler Fassl (1-2)

March 3	Milverton Four Wheel Drives	3 – 9	Georgian Bay Applekings	Beaver Valley Community Centre	Recap
Jeff Fritzley (4) - 11:57		First period	11:24 - Kevin Shuttleworth (4); 10:38 - Noah Rowland (2); 2:26 - Mitchell Good (3); 0:36 - Neal Ross (4)
Jeff Fritzley (5) - 12:22		Second period	13:25 - Reid Simmons (3); 9:50 - Mitchell Good (4); 7:53 - Trenton Micks (3); 3:36 - Jamie Wise (4); 1:02 - Tristen Park (1)
Jeff Fritzley (6) - sh - 5:27		Third period	No scoring
Tim Bester (1-2)		Goalie stats	Allan Menary (4-1)

March 9	Milverton Four Wheel Drives	1 – 3	Georgian Bay Applekings	Beaver Valley Community Centre	Recap
Mitch Boertien (5) - pp - 5:04		First period	14:37 - Jamie Wise (5)
No scoring		Second period	No scoring
No scoring		Third period	10:42 - pp - Kevin Shuttleworth (5); 6:45 - pp - Michael Redick (3)
Tim Bester (1-3, 16 saves / 19 shots)		Goalie stats	Allan Menary (5-1, 11 saves / 12 shots)

March 10	Georgian Bay Applekings	2 – 6	Milverton Four Wheel Drives	Perth East Recreational Complex	Recap
No scoring		First period	6:31 - pp - Jeff Fritzley (7)
Mitchell Good (5) - 7:29		Second period	17:15 - Liam Buckley (2); 13:16 - Ryan Popp (1)
Jamie Wise (6) - pp - 9:40		Third period	13:17 - Curtis Rawn (4); 10:45 - pp - Curtis Rawn (5); 0:15 - Curtis Rawn (6)
Allan Menary (5-2)		Goalie stats	Tyler Fassl (2-2)

March 16	Milverton Four Wheel Drives	3 – 1	Georgian Bay Applekings	Beaver Valley Community Centre	Recap
Derek Erb (1) - 6:10		First period	15:29 - pp - Jamie Wise (7)
Kody Langlois (2) - 4:18		Second period	No scoring
Curtis Rawn (7) - 3:51		Third period	No scoring
Tyler Fassl (3-2, 34 saves / 35 shots)		Goalie stats	Allan Menary (5-3, 22 saves / 25 shots)

March 17	Georgian Bay Applekings	5 – 2	Milverton Four Wheel Drives	Perth East Recreational Complex	Recap
Mackenzie Fleming (6) - 9:48; Reid Simmons (4) - 8:11; Reid Simmons (5) - 5:50		First period	No scoring
Neal Ross (5) - pp - 0:19		Second period	No scoring
Neal Ross (6) - 6:04		Third period	11:03 - pp - Riley Kuepfer (1); 4:03 - pp - Riley Kuepfer (2)
Allan Menary (6-3)		Goalie stats	Tyler Fassl (3-3)

March 24	Milverton Four Wheel Drives	5 – 7	Georgian Bay Applekings	Beaver Valley Community Centre	Recap
No scoring		First period	16:56 - Neal Ross (7); 12:57 - Evan Buehler (2); 3:48 - Neal Ross (8); 3:38 - Jacob Robitaille (2)
Mitch Boertien (6) - 7:39		Second period	1:19 - pp - Neal Ross (9)
Mike Vittelli (1) - 11:22; Colton Quipp (5) - 10:41; Mitch Boertien (7) - 10:24; Kody Langlois (3) - 0:35		Third period	4:00 - Evan Buehler (3); 2:05 - Mackenzie Fleming (7)
Tyler Fassl (3-4)		Goalie stats	Allan Menary (7-3)

Georgian Bay wins series 4 – 3

=== Hugh McLean Trophy scoring leaders ===
Note: GP = Games played; G = Goals; A = Assists; Pts = Points; PIM = Penalty minutes

Player	Team	GP	G	A	Pts	PIM
Curtis Rawn	Milverton Four Wheel Drives	11	7	12	19	14
Mackenzie Fleming	Georgian Bay Applekings	11	7	10	17	16
Mitch Boertien	Milverton Four Wheel Drives	10	7	9	16	14
Neal Ross	Georgian Bay Applekings	11	9	6	15	4
Jeff Fritzley	Milverton Four Wheel Drives	11	7	7	14	0
Evan Buehler	Georgian Bay Applekings	9	3	10	13	2
Noah Rowland	Georgian Bay Applekings	9	2	11	13	20
Kevin Shuttleworth	Georgian Bay Applekings	10	5	7	12	58
Chris Corbett	Milverton Four Wheel Drives	10	4	6	10	2
Mitchell Good	Georgian Bay Applekings	9	5	5	10	26

=== Hugh McLean Trophy leading goaltenders ===
Note: GP = Games played; Mins = Minutes played; W = Wins; L = Losses: OTL = Overtime losses;
SL = Shootout losses; GA = Goals Allowed; SO = Shutouts; GAA = Goals against average

Player	Team	GP	MINS	W	L	GA	SO	GAA
Allan Menary	Georgian Bay Applekings	10	600	7	3	34	0	3.40
Tim Bester	Milverton Four Wheel Drives	4	240	2	2	20	0	5.00
Tyler Fassl	Milverton Four Wheel Drives	7	420	3	4	35	0	5.00
