= 2015–16 WOAA Senior League season =

- League: WOAA Senior AA Hockey League
- Sport: Hockey
- Duration: Regular season October 2015 – January 2016; Playoffs; February 2016 – April 2016
- Teams: 13
- Finals champions: Sr. AA - Clinton Radars; Sr. A - Tillsonburg Thunder

WOAA Senior League seasons
- 2014–15 2016–17

The 2015–16 WOAA Senior League season was the 26th season of the WOAA Senior AA Hockey League. The league played a 24-game regular season which began in October 2015 and concluded in January 2016. The post-season began in February 2016 and concluded in April 2016.

The Clinton Radars won the WOAA Senior AA Hockey Championship, defeating the Mapleton-Minto 81's in the final round of the playoffs.

== Team changes ==
- The Elora Rocks suspended operations in October 2015 after playing two games (losses to Shelburne and Durham). Both games were deleted from the league standings.

== Regular season ==
=== Final standings ===
Note: GP = Games played; W = Wins; L= Losses; OTL = Overtime losses; GF = Goals for; GA = Goals against; Pts = Points; Green shade = Clinched playoff spot

Rank	North Division	GP	W	L	OTL	Pts	GF	GA
1	Mapleton-Minto 81's	24	22	2	0	44	135	51
2	Durham Thundercats	24	17	5	2	36	115	87
3	Saugeen Shores Winterhawks	24	14	8	2	30	105	74
4	Shallow Lake Crushers	24	12	12	0	24	97	109
5	Ripley Wolves	24	9	12	3	21	88	106
6	Shelburne Muskies	24	5	17	2	12	88	106
7	Lucknow Lancers	24	5	19	0	10	72	127

Rank	South Division	GP	W	L	OTL	Pts	GF	GA
1	Clinton Radars	24	21	2	1	43	187	66
2	Tavistock Royals	24	13	8	3	29	120	115
3	Petrolia Squires	24	12	11	1	25	99	102
4	Huron East Centenaires	24	11	13	0	22	98	127
5	Tillsonburg Thunder	24	9	12	3	21	95	137
6	Milverton Four Wheel Drives	24	6	16	2	14	92	144

=== Scoring leaders ===
Note: GP = Games played; G = Goals; A = Assists; Pts = Points; PIM = Penalty minutes

Player	Team	GP	G	A	Pts	PIM
Kurtis Bartliff	Clinton Radars	21	31	35	66	4
Luke Vick	Clinton Radars	21	20	43	63	16
Tyler Doig	Clinton Radars	15	20	38	58	12
Ryan Murphy	Clinton Radars	20	32	24	56	55
Brendon Merritt	Huron East Centenaires	24	20	25	45	14
Brent Freeman	Milverton Four Wheel Drives	21	18	27	45	2
Sean Consitt	Clinton Radars	22	17	27	44	41
Randy Cox	Durham Thundercats	23	16	24	40	21
Andrew Coburn	Mapleton-Minto 81's	24	17	22	39	30
Brett Catto	Ripley Wolves	21	14	25	39	16

== Playoffs ==
=== WOAA Senior "AA" Hockey playoffs ===
The top eight teams qualify for the WOAA Senior "AA" Hockey playoffs. Each series is a best-of-seven.

Division semi-finals
N1	Mapleton-Minto	4
N4	Shallow Lake	0
N2	Durham	2
N3	Saugeen Shores	4
S1	Clinton	4
S4	Huron East	0
S2	Tavistock	3
S3	Petrolia	4

Division finals
N1	Mapleton-Minto	4
N3	Saugeen Shores	1
S1	Clinton	4
S3	Petrolia	2

WOAA Sr. AA finals
N1	Mapleton-Minto	0
S1	Clinton	4

==== WOAA Senior AA divisional semi-finals ====
===== (N1) Mapleton-Minto 81's vs. (N4) Shallow Lake Crushers =====
Note: Game one was played in Drayton.

February 5	Shallow Lake Crushers	0 – 7	Mapleton-Minto 81's	Palmerston

February 6	Mapleton-Minto 81's	6 – 3	Shallow Lake Crushers	Shallow Lake

February 12	Shallow Lake Crushers	2 – 6	Mapleton-Minto 81's	Palmerston

February 13	Mapleton-Minto 81's	8 – 5	Shallow Lake Crushers	Shallow Lake

Mapleton-Minto wins series 4 – 0

===== (N2) Durham Thundercats vs. (N3) Saugeen Shores Winterhawks =====
February 5	Durham Thundercats	3 – 5	Saugeen Shores Winterhawks	Saugeen Shores

February 6	Saugeen Shores Winterhawks	0 – 4	Durham Thundercats	Durham

February 12	Saugeen Shores Winterhawks	1 – 3	Durham Thundercats	Durham

February 13	Durham Thundercats	2 – 5	Saugeen Shores Winterhawks	Saugeen Shores

February 19	Saugeen Shores Winterhawks	7 – 3	Durham Thundercats	Durham

February 20	Durham Thundercats	2 – 3	Saugeen Shores Winterhawks	Saugeen Shores

Saugeen Shores wins series 4 – 2

===== (S1) Clinton Radars vs. (S4) Huron East Centenaires =====
February 5	Huron East Centenaires	2 – 9	Clinton Radars	Clinton

February 6	Huron East Centenaires	2 – 5	Clinton Radars	Clinton

February 12	Clinton Radars	8 – 4	Huron East Centenaires	Seaforth

February 13	Clinton Radars	9 – 2	Huron East Centenaires	Seaforth

Clinton wins series 4 – 0

===== (S2) Tavistock Royals vs. (S3) Petrolia Squires =====
February 5	Tavistock Royals	8 – 5	Petrolia Squires	Petrolia

February 6	Petrolia Squires	5 – 4	OT	Tavistock Royals	Tavistock

February 12	Tavistock Royals	6 – 7	Petrolia Squires	Petrolia

February 17	Petrolia Squires	3 – 4	Tavistock Royals	Tavistock

February 20	Petrolia Squires	2 – 5	Tavistock Royals	Tavistock

February 21	Tavistock Royals	3 – 4	2OT	Petrolia Squires	Petrolia

February 23	Petrolia Squires	6 – 2	Tavistock Royals	Tavistock

Petrolia wins series 4 – 3

==== WOAA Senior AA divisional finals ====
===== (N1) Mapleton-Minto 81's vs. (N3) Saugeen Shores Winterhawks =====
Note: Game five played in Drayton.

February 26	Saugeen Shores Winterhawks	2 – 5	Mapleton-Minto 81's	Palmerston

February 27	Mapleton-Minto 81's	2 – 3	Saugeen Shores Winterhawks	Saugeen Shores

March 4	Saugeen Shores Winterhawks	2 – 6	Mapleton-Minto 81's	Palmerston

March 5	Mapleton-Minto 81's	4 – 3	OT	Saugeen Shores Winterhawks	Saugeen Shores

March 12	Saugeen Shores Winterhawks	4 – 5	OT	Mapleton-Minto 81's	Palmerston

Mapleton-Minto wins series 4 – 1

===== (S1) Clinton Radars vs. (S3) Petrolia Squires =====
February 26	Petrolia Squires	6 – 5	Clinton Radars	Clinton

February 27	Clinton Radars	5 – 1	Petrolia Squires	Petrolia

March 4	Petrolia Squires	0 – 8	Clinton Radars	Clinton

March 5	Clinton Radars	2 – 4	Petrolia Squires	Petrolia

March 11	Petrolia Squires	1 – 2	OT	Clinton Radars	Clinton

March 12	Clinton Radars	7 – 5	Petrolia Squires	Petrolia

Clinton wins series 4 – 2

==== WOAA Sr. AA Championship ====
===== (N1) Mapleton-Minto 81's vs. (S1) Clinton Radars =====
March 18	Clinton Radars	5 – 3	Mapleton-Minto 81's	Palmerston

March 19	Mapleton-Minto 81's	2 – 4	Clinton Radars	Clinton

March 25	Clinton Radars	4 – 1	Mapleton-Minto 81's	Palmerston

March 26	Mapleton-Minto 81's	3 – 7	Clinton Radars	Clinton

Clinton wins series 4 – 0

=== WOAA Senior "A" Hockey playoffs ===
The bottom five teams qualified for the WOAA Senior "A" Hockey playoffs.

==== Round robin ====
The top four teams in the round robin qualify for the WOAA Sr. "A" semi-finals.

Rank	Round robin	GP	W	L	Pts	GF	GA
1	Tillsonburg Thunder	4	3	1	6	19	20
2	Milverton Four Wheel Drives	4	3	1	6	27	19
3	Ripley Wolves	4	2	2	4	18	14
4	Shelburne Muskies	4	1	3	2	12	21
5	Lucknow Lancers	4	1	3	2	10	12

==== Playoff bracket ====
WOAA Sr. A semi-finals
N5	Ripley	4
N6	Shelburne	0
S5	Tillsonburg	4
S6	Milverton	3

WOAA Sr. A finals
N5	Ripley	1
S5	Tillsonburg	4

==== WOAA Senior A semi-finals ====
===== (N5) Ripley Wolves vs. (N6) Shelburne Muskies =====
February 26	Shelburne Muskies	2 – 3	Ripley Wolves	Ripley

February 27	Ripley Wolves	7 – 5	Shelburne Muskies	Shelburne

March 4	Shelburne Muskies	4 – 6	Ripley Wolves	Ripley

March 5	Ripley Wolves	3 – 2	Shelburne Muskies	Shelburne

Ripley wins series 4 – 0

===== (S5) Tillsonburg Thunder vs. (S6) Milverton Four Wheel Drives =====
February 27	Milverton Four Wheel Drives	2 – 5	Tillsonburg Thunder	Tillsonburg

February 28	Tillsonburg Thunder	5 – 6	OT	Milverton Four Wheel Drives	Milverton

March 5	Milverton Four Wheel Drives	6 – 5	OT	Tillsonburg Thunder	Tillsonburg

March 6	Tillsonburg Thunder	3 – 8	Milverton Four Wheel Drives	Milverton

March 12	Milverton Four Wheel Drives	3 – 4	OT	Tillsonburg Thunder	Tillsonburg

March 13	Tillsonburg Thunder	6 – 3	Milverton Four Wheel Drives	Milverton

March 15	Milverton Four Wheel Drives	3 – 4	OT	Tillsonburg Thunder	Tillsonburg

Tillsonburg wins series 4 – 3

==== WOAA Senior A finals ====
===== (N5) Ripley Wolves vs. (S5) Tillsonburg Thunder =====
March 19	Ripley Wolves	1 – 7	Tillsonburg Thunder	Tillsonburg

March 25	Tillsonburg Thunder	3 – 6	Ripley Wolves	Ripley

March 26	Ripley Wolves	1 – 2	OT	Tillsonburg Thunder	Tillsonburg

April 1	Tillsonburg Thunder	7 – 4	Ripley Wolves	Ripley

April 2	Tillsonburg Thunder	4 – 3	Ripley Wolves	Ripley

Tillsonburg wins series 4 – 1
