= 2025–26 OEHL season =

3rd season of the Ontario Elite Hockey League

- League: Ontario Elite Hockey League
- Sport: Hockey
- Duration: Regular season October 3, 2025 – January 31, 2026; Playoffs; February 6, 2026 – April 2026
- Teams: 18
- Finals champions: J. F. Paxton Trophy: Seaforth Centenaires; Hugh McLean Trophy: Saugeen Shores Winterhawks

OEHL seasons
- 2024–25 2026–27

The 2025–26 OEHL season is the third season of the Ontario Elite Hockey League. The league began play on October 3, 2025 and concluded on January 31, 2026. The post-season began on February 6, 2026 and concluded on April 26, 2026.

The Seaforth Centenaires won the J. F. Paxton Trophy, as they defeated the Ripley Wolves in six games.

Due to the length of the post-season, the Minto 81's have been announced as the OEHL representative at the Allan Cup. At the Allan Cup, the 81's finished in fifth place.

== Off-season ==
=== Expansion ===
On May 23, 2025, the OEHL member clubs and the Ontario Hockey Association approved three expansion applications for the 2025–26 season. Two weeks later, on June 6, the league announced the approval of two more expansion applications. This will bring the league to 16 teams.

In the first round of expansion, the OEHL member clubs and the OHA approved the applications for the Elora Rocks, Shelburne Muskies and Tillsonburg Thunder. All three teams had previously played in the WOAA Senior Hockey League.

In the second round of expansion, the OEHL member clubs and the OHA approved the applications for the Dunnville Aeros and Elmvale Harvesters.

In the third round of expansion, the OEHL announced the Delhi Flames and the Petrolia Squires would join the league, bringing the number of franchises to 18 in the league.

=== Conferences ===
With the OEHL expanding to 18 teams, the league announced that the teams would be split into two conferences, the North Conference and South Conference. Teams will play a 20-game regular season schedule with all games played within their conference.

2025–26 OEHL Conferences
North Conference	South Conference
Creemore Coyotes	Delhi Flames
Durham Thundercats	Dunnville Aeros
Elmvale Harvesters	Elora Rocks
Georgian Bay Applekings	Erin Outlaws
Lucknow Lancers	Milverton Four Wheel Drives
Minto 81's	Petrolia Squires
Ripley Wolves	Seaforth Centenaires
Saugeen Shores Winterhawks	Tavistock Royals
Shelburne Muskies	Tillsonburg Thunder

== Regular season ==
=== Final standings ===
Note: GP = Games played; W = Wins; L= Losses; OTL = Overtime losses; GF = Goals for; GA = Goals against; Pts = Points; Green shade = Clinched playoff spot

Rank	North Conference	GP	W	L	OTL	SL	Pts	GF	GA
1	Ripley Wolves	20	16	4	0	0	32	117	49
2	Minto 81's	20	15	4	1	0	31	103	65
3	Elmvale Harvesters	20	14	5	1	0	29	116	89
4	Durham Thundercats	20	14	6	0	0	28	140	72
5	Saugeen Shores Winterhawks	20	11	7	1	1	24	95	81
6	Georgian Bay Applekings	20	11	9	0	0	22	102	95
7	Lucknow Lancers	20	4	15	1	0	9	55	119
8	Shelburne Muskies	20	3	15	2	0	8	62	128
9	Creemore Coyotes	20	2	18	0	0	4	61	153

Rank	South Conference	GP	W	L	OTL	SL	Pts	GF	GA
1	Seaforth Centenaires	20	15	4	0	1	31	103	48
2	Petrolia Squires	20	15	5	0	0	30	99	61
3	Elora Rocks	20	14	6	0	0	28	118	78
4	Erin Outlaws	20	12	5	1	2	27	89	68
5	Tavistock Royals	20	12	7	1	0	25	100	76
6	Dunnville Aeros	20	9	11	0	0	18	92	87
7	Tillsonburg Thunder	20	8	11	0	1	17	79	76
8	Milverton Four Wheel Drives	20	5	10	3	2	15	63	96
9	Delhi Flames	20	0	20	0	0	0	21	174

=== Scoring leaders ===
Note: GP = Games played; G = Goals; A = Assists; Pts = Points; PIM = Penalty minutes

Player	Team	GP	G	A	Pts	PIM
Brody LeBlanc	Durham Thundercats	20	31	30	61	6
Luke Eurig	Durham Thundercats	20	23	35	58	16
Jacob Kelly	Elmvale Harvesters	19	19	39	58	14
Garrett Meurs	Ripley Wolves	17	19	29	48	34
Cody Britton	Ripley Wolves	19	19	27	46	6
Mackenzie Fleming	Georgian Bay Applekings	20	19	27	46	24
Kyler Nixon	Durham Thundercats	20	11	34	45	6
Evan Buehler	Georgian Bay Applekings	18	11	28	39	8
Alex Uttley	Elora Rocks	19	10	29	39	32
Mitch Atkins	Tavistock Royals	20	10	25	35	10

=== Leading goaltenders ===
Note: GP = Games played; Mins = Minutes played; W = Wins; L = Losses: OTL = Overtime losses;
GA = Goals Allowed; SO = Shutouts; GAA = Goals against average

Player	Team	GP	MINS	W	L	OTL	GA	SO	GAA
Ben Nelson	Minto 81's	6	333	5	0	0	10	0	1.80
Alex Hutcheson	Seaforth Centenaires	12	668	10	2	0	23	0	2.07
Jason Hamilton	Ripley Wolves	11	634	8	3	0	22	2	2.08
Tyler Parr	Seaforth Centenaires	9	523	5	2	1	23	0	2.64
Garrett Golley	Ripley Wolves	9	498	7	1	0	23	0	2.77

== Playoffs ==
=== J. F. Paxton Trophy playoffs ===
The top seven teams in each conference qualify for the J.F. Paxton Trophy playoffs. The eighth and ninth place teams will play a best-of-three series for the eighth seed.

==== J. F. Paxton Trophy playoff bracket ====
Preliminary round
1	Ripley	bye
8	Shelburne	2
9	Creemore	1
2	Minto	bye
7	Lucknow	bye
North Conference
3	Elmvale	bye
6	Georgian Bay	bye
4	Durham	bye
5	Saugeen Shores	bye
1	Seaforth	bye
8	Milverton	2
9	Delhi	0
2	Petrolia	bye
7	Tillsonburg	bye
South Conference
3	Elora	bye
6	Dunnville	bye
4	Erin	bye
5	Tavistock	bye

Conference quarterfinals
1	Ripley	4
8	Shelburne	0
2	Minto	4
7	Lucknow	0
3	Elmvale	4
6	Georgian Bay	0
4	Durham	4
5	Saugeen Shores	0
1	Seaforth	4
8	Milverton	0
2	Petrolia	4
7	Tillsonburg	1
3	Elora	4
6	Dunnville	1
4	Erin	0
5	Tavistock	4

Conference semifinals
1	Ripley	4
4	Durham	3
2	Minto	4
3	Elmvale	0
1	Seaforth	4
5	Tavistock	3
2	Petrolia	1
3	Elora	4

Conference finals
1	Ripley	4
2	Minto	2
1	Seaforth	4
3	Elora	1

Paxton Trophy finals
N1	Ripley	2
S1	Seaforth	4

==== Preliminary round ====
===== North conference preliminary round =====
====== (8) Shelburne Muskies vs. (9) Creemore Coyotes ======
Note: Game one was played at Dundalk Arena in Dundalk, Ontario
Note: Creemore forfeited Game three due to not having enough players

February 6	Creemore Coyotes	9 – 5	Shelburne Muskies	Centre Dufferin Complex	Recap
Tayden Hannivan (1) - 18:16; Owen Heilemann (1) - pp - 16:57; Jordan Taylor (1) - pp - 16:36		First period	15:50 - sh - Keith Palmer (1); 10:31 - sh - Chris Webber (1); 7:05 - pp - Corey Allen (1); 5:13 - Devin Train (1)
Nick Sammons (1) - 13:33; Kevin Boyd (1) - pp - 2:32; Jordan Taylor (2) - pp - 1:53; Jordan Taylor (3) - pp - 1:49		Second period	No scoring
Jacob Vander Zaag (1) - 10:42; Colin Kijowski (1) - 1:42		Third period	19:45 - Chris Webber (2)
Tyrus Mawson (1-0)		Goalie stats	Dominic Marquis (0-1)

February 7	Shelburne Muskies	7 – 6	Creemore Coyotes	Creemore Recreation Centre	Recap
Aaron McGurik (1) - pp - 15:02; Carter Leroux (1) - pp - 14:18; Didier Koenigs (1) - 12:53		First period	7:54 - pp - Jacob Vander Zaag (2); 6:23 - pp - Jacob Vander Zaag (3)
Alessandro Nicastro (1) - 17:28; Keith Palmer (1) - 16:24		Second period	8:06 - Nick Sammons (2)
Jake Belvedere (1) - 18:13; Danny Rivet (1) - 12:47		Third period	11:40 - pp - Jacob Taylor (4); 8:56 - Jordan Taylor (5); 5:14 - pp - Kevin Boyd (2)
Dominic Marquis (1-1)		Goalie stats	Vince Michelizzi (0-1)

February 8	Creemore Coyotes	0 – 1	Shelburne Muskies	Centre Dufferin Complex

Shelburne wins series 2 – 1

===== South conference preliminary round =====
====== (8) Milverton Four Wheel Drives vs. (9) Delhi Flames ======
February 7	Milverton Four Wheel Drives	9 – 2	Delhi Flames	Delhi Community Arena	Recap
Jacob Clemmer (1) - 14:32; Dennis Dewar (1) - 12:14; Jacob Clemmer (2) - 5:50		First period	3:23 - pp - Mike Crampton (1)
Connor Doerbecker (1) - 11:37; Jacob Clemmer (3) - 11:05; Connor Doerbecker (2) - 9:01; Eric Lacey (1) - 5:36		Second period	14:08 - pp - Mike Crampton (2)
Reese Stanley (1) - 12:46; Riley Kuepfer (1) - 1:36		Third period	No scoring
Bradley Boville (1-0)		Goalie stats	Cameron Huff (0-1)

February 8	Delhi Flames	3 – 8	Milverton Four Wheel Drives	Perth East Recreation Complex	Recap
Mike Crampton (3) - pp - 9:48		First period	10:10 - Carson Wickie (1); 3:07 - pp - Austin Stemmler (1); 0:11 - Colton Quipp (1)
No scoring		Second period	17:00 - pp - Brady Brezynskie (1); 15:09 - pp - Jacob Clemmer (4); 10:26 - Dennis Dewar (2)
Brendan Briggs (1) - 8:36; Brandon Capozucca (1) - pp - 3:03		Third period	16:04 - Riley Kuepfer (2); 5:55 - Brendan Schneider (1)
Caleb Ursu (0-1)		Goalie stats	Logan Bromley (1-0)

Milverton wins series 2 – 0

==== Conference quarter-finals ====
===== North conference quarter-finals =====
====== (1) Ripley Wolves vs. (8) Shelburne Muskies ======
February 13	Ripley Wolves	12 – 2	Shelburne Muskies	Centre Dufferin Complex	Recap
Jordan Moulton (1) - pp - 17:44; Evan Visser (1) - pp - 16:37; Dawson Fahrer (1) - 11:54; Garrett Meurs (1) - 9:33; JD Falconer (1) - 4:32; Jarred Colling (1) - 0:57		First period	No scoring
Dan Nicoloff (1) - 8:16; Kaden Hoggarth (1) - 5:59		Second period	No scoring
Ethan Skinner (1) - pp - 15:58; Jordan Moulton (2) - 7:15; Dan Nicoloff (2) - 5:10; Dan Nicoloff (3) - 1:37		Third period	12:21 - pp - Keith Palmer (3); 0:20 - Kyle Burke (1)
Jason Hamilton (1-0)		Goalie stats	Dominic Marquis (1-2); Gatlin Burt

February 14	Shelburne Muskies	2 – 14	Ripley Wolves	Ripley-Huron Complex	Recap
Chris Webber (3) - sh - 4:09		First period	18:33 - Cody Britton (1); 13:58 - Cody Britton (2); 10:36 - Carter Servais (1); 2:24 - Craig McKague (1)
Keith Palmer (4) - 1:35		Second period	18:08 - Garrett Meurs (2); 14:14 - Carter Servais (2); 8:51 - Jordan Beisel (1); 5:24 - sh - Pat Looby (1)
No scoring		Third period	18:16 - Carter Servais (3); 14:05 - pp - Cody Britton (3); 12:57 - pp - Dan Nicoloff (4); 10:34 - pp - Garrett Meurs (3); 9:43 - pp - Jordan Moulton (3); 0:15 - pp - Austin Waite (1)
Gatlin Burt (0-1); Dominic Marquis		Goalie stats	Garrett Golley (1-0)

February 20	Ripley Wolves	12 – 7	Shelburne Muskies	Centre Dufferin Complex	Recap
Wilson Shipp (1) - 16:47; Carter Servais (4) - 15:41; Kaden Hoggarth (2) - 9:09		First period	16:30 - Didier Koenigs (2)
Kaden Hoggarth (3) - 14:43; JD Falconer (2) - 10:49; Dawson Fahrer (2) - 10:04; Kaden Hoggarth (4) - 6:10; Tyson Soers (1) - 0:02		Second period	19:04 - Keith Palmer (5); 15:24 - Keith Palmer (6); 13:56 - Didier Koenigs (3); 7:58 - pp - Keith Palmer (7)
Dan Nicoloff (5) - pp - 18:12; Carter Servais (5) - 9:57; Ethan Skinner (2) - sh - 5:57; Christian Monachino (1) - 3:11		Third period	18:38 - sh - Jamie Couvreur (1); 13:07 - pp - Chris Webber (4)
Garrett Golley (2-0)		Goalie stats	Dominic Marquis (1-3)

February 21	Shelburne Muskies	2 – 3	Ripley Wolves	Ripley-Huron Complex	Recap
No scoring		First period	5:12 - Craig McKague (2)
Didier Koenigs (4) - 10:16		Second period	18:21 - Cody Britton (4); 9:40 - Christian Monachino (2)
Danny Rivet (2) - 2:02		Third period	No scoring
Gatlin Burt (0-2)		Goalie stats	Jason Hamilton (2-0)

Ripley wins series 4 – 0

====== (2) Minto 81's vs. (7) Lucknow Lancers ======
February 7	Lucknow Lancers	4 – 7	Minto 81's	Palmerston Community Centre	Recap
Brett Binning (1) - 14:47		First period	13:19 - Caleb Warren (1); 12:13 - Liam Hurley (1); 6:53 - Jordan Alexander (1)
Chase Meurs (1) - pp - 11:10; Brett Binning (2) - 5:36; Jamie Miller (1) - sh - 3:43		Second period	19:29 - Blair Butchart (1); 12:44 - Aidan Yarde (1); 10:30 - Caleb Warren (2)
No scoring		Third period	1:44 - Jordan Alexander (2)
Liam McCarthy (0-1)		Goalie stats	Ben Nelson (1-0)

February 14	Minto 81's	6 – 4	Lucknow Lancers	Lucknow Sports Complex	Recap
Liam Hurley (2) - pp - 4:51		First period	No scoring
Adam Logozzo (1) - 17:31; Liam Hurley (3) - 1:00		Second period	15:20 - pp - Chase Chapman (1); 3:02 - pp - Chase Chapman (2)
Stephen Gibson (1) - pp - 15:36; Owen Torrie (1) - 14:42; Caleb Warren (3) - 9:15		Third period	7:33 - sh - Brayden Fischer (1); 6:56 - Chase Meurs (2)
Ben Nelson (2-0)		Goalie stats	Liam McCarthy (0-2)

February 15	Lucknow Lancers	0 – 6	Minto 81's	Palmerston Community Centre	Recap
No scoring		First period	10:10 - Keaton Willis (1); 2:10 - pp - Eric Margo (1); 1:28 - Caleb Warren (4)
No scoring		Second period	7:55 - pp - Keaton Willis (2)
No scoring		Third period	13:32 - Keaton Willis (3); 1:31 - Stephen Gibson (2)
Liam McCarthy (0-3)		Goalie stats	Jonathan Reinhart (1-0)

February 21	Minto 81's	7 – 1	Lucknow Lancers	Lucknow Sports Complex	Recap
Keaton Willis (4) - pp - 12:43; Mason Kohn (1) - 9:50; Jordan Alexander (3) - 3:21		First period	No scoring
Brenden Clayton (1) - 18:09; Chayse Herffort (1) - 14:10; Stephen Gibson (3) - sh - 9:08		Second period	1:56 - Jack Stecho (1)
Owen Torrie (2) - 4:15		Third period	No scoring
Jonathan Reinhart (2-0)		Goalie stats	Odin Hessel (0-1)

Minto wins series 4 – 0

====== (3) Elmvale Harvesters vs. (6) Georgian Bay Applekings ======
February 6	Elmvale Harvesters	6 – 3	Georgian Bay Applekings	Beaver Valley Community Centre	Recap
Jacob Kelly (1) - 15:30		First period	No scoring
Jordan Fuller (1) - 14:52; Jacob Kelly (2) - 4:24; Jeremy Robertson (1) - 2:16		Second period	1:58 - Jamie Wise (1)
Jordan Fuller (2) - 17:01; Owen King (1) - 4:53		Third period	9:24 - sh - Scott Dorion (1); 6:13 - Evan Buehler (1)
Noah Featherstonhaugh-Gowe (1-0)		Goalie stats	Allan Menary (0-1)

February 7	Georgian Bay Applekings	5 – 7	Elmvale Harvesters	Elmvale Community Centre	Recap
No scoring		First period	12:01 - pp - Riley Pitt (1)
Jamie Wise (2) - 18:23; Austin Ulett (1) - 11:39; Mackenzie Fleming (1) - pp - 4:25; Jamie Wise (3) - pp - 1:25; Mackenzie Fleming (2) - 0:19		Second period	7:22 - pp - Jordan Fuller (3); 4:06 - Riley Pitt (2)
No scoring		Third period	14:32 - pp - Ryan Young (1); 8:13 - pp - Ryan Young (2); 1:07 - Jordan Fuller (4); 0:13 - en - Owen King (2)
Allan Menary (0-2)		Goalie stats	Noah Featherstonhaugh-Gowe (2-0)

February 14	Georgian Bay Applekings	5 – 6	Elmvale Harvesters	Elmvale Community Centre	Recap
Kegan Hoover (1) - 16:12; Evan Buehler (2) - 15:59; Jamie Wise (4) - 4:18		First period	No scoring
Mackenzie Fleming (3) - 19:10		Second period	18:05 - pp - Ryan Young (3); 0:49 - Ryan Young (4)
Evan Buehler (3) - 19:34		Third period	12:35 - Riley Pitt (3); 9:18 - Jacob Kelly (3); 5:47 - Jacob Kelly (4); 1:14 - pp - Riley Pitt (4)
Allan Menary (0-3)		Goalie stats	Noah Featherstonhaugh-Gowe (3-0)

February 15	Elmvale Harvesters	8 – 6	Georgian Bay Applekings	Beaver Valley Community Centre	Recap
Jacob Kelly (5) - 15:55; Jordan Fuller (5) - pp - 13:40; Ryan Young (5) - pp - 4:46		First period	12:39 - pp - Jamie Wise (5); 8:29 - Evan Buehler (4)
Jacob Kelly (6) - 16:45; Jacob Kelly (7) - pp - 9:04; Austin Pope (1) - 7:30		Second period	15:05 - pp - Jamie Wise (6)
Jacob Kelly (8) - sh - 15:06; Jacob Kelly (9) - 2:29		Third period	12:04 - Jamie Wise (7); 8:27 - Evan Buehler (5); 5:08 - Noah Rowland (1)
Noah Featherstonhaugh-Gowe (4-0)		Goalie stats	Allan Menary (0-4)

Elmvale wins series 4 – 0

====== (4) Durham Thundercats vs. (5) Saugeen Shores Winterhawks ======
February 6	Durham Thundercats	6 – 1	Saugeen Shores Winterhawks	The Plex	Recap
Ryan Colquhoun (1) - 8:12; Kyler Nixon (1) - pp - 4:38; Luke Eurig (1) - 0:26		First period	18:05 - Miles MacLean (1)
Kyle Maloney (1) - 10:47		Second period	No scoring
Justin Graham (1) - 7:53; Kyle Maloney (2) - pp - 4:51		Third period	No scoring
Brendon Landry (1-0)		Goalie stats	Clayton Fritsch (0-1)

February 7	Saugeen Shores Winterhawks	4 – 5	Durham Thundercats	Durham Community Centre	Recap
Caleb Morrison (1) - 3:01; Josh Urbshott (1) - 2:00		First period	16:23 - pp - Ryan Colquhoun (2); 7:25 - Kyler Nixon (2); 0:13 - Kyler Nixon (3)
Todd Hellyer (1) - 13:58		Second period	No scoring
Rob Flick (1) - 15:11		Third period	7:37 - Luke Eurig (2); 2:40 - Justin Graham (2)
Clayton Fritsch (0-2)		Goalie stats	Brendon Landry (2-0)

February 13	Durham Thundercats	8 – 3	Saugeen Shores Winterhawks	The Plex	Recap
Kyle Maloney (3) - 18:23; Austin Becker (1) - 16:01; Justin Graham (3) - sh - 7:40; Kyler Nixon (4) - 2:12		First period	13:04 - Miles MacLean (2)
Kyle Maloney (4) - 4:08; Brody LeBlanc (1) - 3:24; Luke Eurig (3) - pp - 0:17		Second period	18:51 - pp - Luke Pither (1); 1:55 - Trevor Donaldson (1)
Brody LeBlanc (2) - 13:35		Third period	No scoring
Brendon Landry (3-0)		Goalie stats	Clayton Fritsch (0-3)

February 14	Saugeen Shores Winterhawks	3 – 6	Durham Thundercats	Durham Community Centre	Recap
No scoring		First period	10:43 - pp - Brody LeBlanc (3); 6:59 - Austin Becker (2); 4:33 - Jack Weiser (1)
Miles MacLean (3) - 15:28; Josh Urbshott (2) - 2:08		Second period	No scoring
Justin Marlowe (1) - 14:50		Third period	12:32 - Justin Graham (4); 7:13 - Justin Graham (5); 0:27 - en - Kyler Nixon (5)
Clayton Fritsch (0-4)		Goalie stats	Brendon Landry (4-0)

Durham wins series 4 – 0

===== South conference quarter-finals =====
====== (1) Seaforth Centenaires vs. (8) Milverton Four Wheel Drives ======
February 14	Milverton Four Wheel Drives	1 – 6	Seaforth Centenaires	Seaforth Community Centre	Recap
Carson Wickie (2) - 1:21		First period	19:23 - Camden Daigle (1); 13:53 - pp - Jared Nash (1)
No scoring		Second period	14:57 - Sean Chisholm (1)
No scoring		Third period	12:02 - Camden Daigle (2); 9:34 - Ray Huether (1); 1:15 - pp - Kyle Stanbury (1)
Bradley Boville (1-1)		Goalie stats	Alex Hutcheson (1-0)

February 15	Seaforth Centenaires	4 – 2	Milverton Four Wheel Drives	Perth East Recreation Complex	Recap
Kyle Stanbury (2) - pp - 13:16		First period	3:01 - Riley Kuepfer (3)
Sheldon Pryce (1) - 14:24; Camden Daigle (3) - pp - 4:39; Reid Oliver (1) - pp - 2:24		Second period	No scoring
No scoring		Third period	5:36 - pp - Dennis Dewar (3)
Alex Hutcheson (2-0)		Goalie stats	Bradley Boville (1-2)

February 20	Seaforth Centenaires	6 – 2	Milverton Four Wheel Drives	Perth East Recreation Complex	Recap
Sheldon Pryce (2) - 18:48		First period	No scoring
Jarrett Bogdon (1) - 19:09; Jared Nash (2) - pp - 15:04; Kyle Stanbury (3) - sh - 6:55		Second period	16:11 - pp - Chad Swartzentruber (1); 1:47 - Dennis Dewar (4)
Sean Chisholm (2) - 17:46; Jarrett Bogdon (2) - 6:07		Third period	No scoring
Alex Hutcheson (3-0)		Goalie stats	Bradley Boville (1-3)

February 21	Milverton Four Wheel Drives	3 – 5	Seaforth Centenaires	Seaforth Community Centre	Recap
No scoring		First period	5:03 - pp - Jarrett Bogdon (3); 4:34 - pp - Jared Nash (3)
Brendan Schneider (2) - pp - 19:51; Dennis Dewar (5) - pp - 1:42		Second period	15:52 - Reid Oliver (2); 4:01 - Jared Nash (4)
Curtis Butler (1) - 7:38		Third period	0:23 - pp - Sean Chisholm (3)
Bradley Boville (1-4)		Goalie stats	Alex Hutcheson (4-0)

Seaforth wins series 4 – 0

====== (2) Petrolia Squires vs. (7) Tillsonburg Thunder ======
February 6	Tillsonburg Thunder	1 – 4	Petrolia Squires	Greenwood Arena	Recap
Jayme Forslund (1) - 13:31		First period	6:53 - T.J. Harris (1); 2:12 - T.J. Harris (2)
No scoring		Second period	14:44 - pp - Curtis Helps (1)
No scoring		Third period	1:20 - T.J. Harris (3)
Ben Blacker (0-1)		Goalie stats	Jakob Knowles (1-0)

February 10	Petrolia Squires	2 – 5	Tillsonburg Thunder	Tillsonburg Community Centre	Recap
Zach Vaneyk (1) - 0:27		First period	11:12 - Luke Sinclair (1)
No scoring		Second period	8:44 - pp - Justin Abraham (1); 2:38 - Hunter Monkhouse (1)
Carson Peer (1) - pp - 11:12		Third period	12:45 - Braden Roberts (1); 5:52 - Nicolas D'Agostino (1)
Jakob Knowles (1-1)		Goalie stats	Ben Blacker (1-1)

February 13	Tillsonburg Thunder	1 – 4	Petrolia Squires	Greenwood Arena	Recap
No scoring		First period	1:09 - Isaac McLean (1)
No scoring		Second period	17:15 - pp - Eric Marsh (1); 4:16 - T.J. Harris (4)
Hunter Monkhouse (2) - pp - 17:11		Third period	0:33 - en - pp - Josh Barraclough (1)
Ben Blacker (1-2)		Goalie stats	Jakob Knowles (2-1)

February 14	Petrolia Squires	6 – 2	Tillsonburg Thunder	Tillsonburg Community Centre	Recap
Carson Peer (2) - 16:14; Carson Peer (3) - 13:06		First period	5:46 - pp - Danny Attridge (1)
Carson Peer (4) - pp - 12:28; Daniel Gibson (1) - 10:12; Carson Peer (5) - 1:49; Ryan Fraser (1) - 0:13		Second period	9:45 - Nicolas D'Agostino (2)
No scoring		Third period	No scoring
Jakob Knowles (3-1)		Goalie stats	Ben Blacker (1-3)

February 20	Tillsonburg Thunder	2 – 3	Petrolia Squires	Greenwood Arena	Recap
No scoring		First period	14:17 - Curtis Helps (2); 10:30 - Ryan Fraser (2)
Andrew Oosterveld (1) - 9:07		Second period	No scoring
Hunter Monkhouse (3) - pp - 9:49		Third period	5:30 - Zach Vaneyk (2)
Ben Blacker (1-4)		Goalie stats	Jakob Knowles (4-1)

Petrolia wins series 4 – 1

====== (3) Elora Rocks vs. (6) Dunnville Aeros ======
February 7	Elora Rocks	4 – 8	Dunnville Aeros	Dunnville Memorial Arena	Recap
Klayton Hoelscher (1) - 19:44; Alex Uttley (1) - pp - 11:42; Klayton Hoelscher (2) - pp - 0:53		First period	19:26 - Silas Crawford (1); 9:42 - pp - Tom Longland (1)
Alex Uttley (2) - 5:38		Second period	19:18 - Landon Minor (1); 8:46 - Matt Ruigrok (1); 7:50 - pp - Brad Parish (1)
No scoring		Third period	16:02 - Landon Minor (2); 5:06 - London Murray (1); 1:05 - pp - Matt Ruigrok (2)
Colin Dunne (0-1)		Goalie stats	Jeremy Currie (1-0)

February 13	Dunnville Aeros	0 – 10	Elora Rocks	Jefferson Community Centre	Recap
No scoring		First period	14:32 - Zack Cameron (1); 12:40 - Klayton Hoelscher (3); 9:38 - pp - Matt Kennedy (1); 9:14 - pp - Steve Dol (1); 1:07 - Jamie Collins (1)
No scoring		Second period	16:55 - sh - Alex Uttley (3)
No scoring		Third period	17:35 - Zack Cameron (2); 16:35 - Brayden Krieger (1); 9:18 - Andrew Merrett (1); 0:16 - pp - Matt Kennedy (2)
Jeremy Currie (1-1)		Goalie stats	Colin Dunne (1-1)

February 14	Dunnville Aeros	5 – 7	Elora Rocks	Jefferson Community Centre	Recap
Brad Parish (2) - 15:28; Matt Ruigrok (3) - 12:52		First period	19:08 - Alex Uttley (4); 5:53 - Spencer MacCormack (1); 5:33 - Matt Tolton (1)
Taylor Barnett (1) - 15:58		Second period	12:11 - Andrew Merrett (2); 5:02 - Ethan Broderick (1)
Silas Crawford (2) - 7:16; Matt Ruigrok (4) - 5:10		Third period	19:03 - pp - Ryan Maskymyk (1); 0:07 - en - Matt Kennedy (3)
Brandon White (0-1)		Goalie stats	Matt Woroniuk (1-0)

February 16	Elora Rocks	6 – 4	Dunnville Aeros	Dunnville Memorial Arena	Recap
Brayden Krieger (2) - 5:48		First period	14:55 - Silas Crawford (3)
No scoring		Second period	17:34 - Brad Parish (3); 15:42 - pp - Tom Longland (2)
Zack Cameron (3) - pp - 17:45; Zack Cameron (4) - 12:36; Steve Dol (2) - 9:38; Zack Cameron (5) - 0:47; Brayden Krieger (3) - en - 0:10		Third period	15:04 - pp - Brad Parish (4)
Colin Dunne (2-1)		Goalie stats	Brandon White (0-2)

February 20	Dunnville Aeros	1 – 10	Elora Rocks	Jefferson Community Centre	Recap
Brad Parish (5) - 10:36		First period	8:27 - Matt Tolton (2); 7:50 - Spencer MacCormack (2); 4:54 - Zack Cameron (6)
No scoring		Second period	19:34 - pp - Klayton Hoelscher (4); 18:54 - Mark McIntosh (1); 12:51 - pp - Matt Kennedy (4); 2:08 - Mark McIntosh (2)
No scoring		Third period	9:05 - pp - Matteo Condotta (1); 8:38 - Jacob Black (1); 6:24 - Mark McIntosh (3)
Brandon White (0-3)		Goalie stats	Colin Dunne (3-1)

Elora wins series 4 – 1

====== (4) Erin Outlaws vs. (5) Tavistock Royals ======
February 7	Tavistock Royals	3 – 0	Erin Outlaws	Centre 2000	Recap
No scoring		First period	No scoring
Lucas Bast (1) - 13:51		Second period	No scoring
Mitch Atkins (1) - 13:26; Tristan Hohl (1) - 7:30		Third period	No scoring
Andrew Masters (1-0)		Goalie stats	Scott Smith (0-1)

February 8	Erin Outlaws	0 – 5	Tavistock Royals	Tavistock Recreation Centre	Recap
No scoring		First period	No scoring
No scoring		Second period	16:53 - Deven Kropf (1); 15:09 - Drew Gerth (1); 7:04 - pp - Drew Gerth (2); 5:54 - Colin Martin (1); 4:41 - Sean Kienapple (1)
No scoring		Third period	No scoring
Scott Smith (0-2)		Goalie stats	Andrew Masters (2-0)

February 14	Tavistock Royals	3 – 0	Erin Outlaws	Centre 2000	Recap
No scoring		First period	No scoring
No scoring		Second period	Patrick Vulgan (1) - pp - 4:53; Deven Kropf (2) - 0:58
No scoring		Third period	Luke Fanjoy (1) - pp - 14:44
Andrew Masters (3-0)		Goalie stats	Tyson Gustaw (0-1)

February 15	Erin Outlaws	1 – 5	Tavistock Royals	Tavistock Recreation Centre	Recap
No scoring		First period	5:43 - Drew Gerth (3); 2:05 - sh - Deven Kropf (3); 0:25 - pp - Deven Kropf (4)
No scoring		Second period	11:08 - sh - Drew Gerth (4)
Travis Brown (1) - 1:08		Third period	14:48 - pp - Drew Gerth (5)
Tyson Gustaw (0-2)		Goalie stats	Andrew Masters (4-0)

Tavistock wins series 4 – 0

==== Conference semi-finals ====
===== North conference semi-finals =====
====== (1) Ripley Wolves vs. (4) Durham Thundercats ======
February 28	Ripley Wolves	8 – 5	Durham Thundercats	Durham Community Centre	Recap
Tyson Soers (2) - 8:21; Garrett Meurs (4) - 7:48		First period	No scoring
JD Falconer (3) - pp - 17:21; Garrett Meurs (5) - pp - 0:03		Second period	15:59 - Luke Eurig (4); 13:37 - pp - Justin Graham (6); 9:59 - Brody LeBlanc (4)
Garrett Meurs (6) - 19:21; Dan Nicoloff (6) - 14:27; Gerrit Satosek (1) - 9:21; Christian Monachino (3) - 5:37		Third period	19:04 - Ryan Colquhoun (3); 8:11 - pp - Brody LeBlanc (5)
Jason Hamilton (3-0)		Goalie stats	Brendon Landry (4-1)

March 1	Durham Thundercats	2 – 5	Ripley Wolves	Ripley-Huron Complex	Recap
Luke Eurig (5) - 15:17		First period	12:26 - Jordan Moulton (4)
Ryan Colquhoun (4) - pp - 10:59		Second period	13:17 - pp - Logan Swanton (1); 2:46 - Garrett Meurs (7)
No scoring		Third period	16:53 - Carter Servais (6); 1:29 - en - Ethan Skinner (2)
Brendon Landry (4-2)		Goalie stats	Garrett Golley (3-0)

March 7	Ripley Wolves	3 – 4	Durham Thundercats	Durham Community Centre	Recap
Logan Swanton (2) - 9:36		First period	16:30 - Austin Becker (3); 10:47 - sh - Luke Eurig (6); 4:36 - pp - Brody LeBlanc (6)
Jarred Colling (2) - 19:16; Cody Britton (5) - pp - 1:08		Second period	No scoring
No scoring		Third period	2:05 - Patrick Brown (1)
Jason Hamilton (3-1)		Goalie stats	Brendon Landry (5-2)

March 8	Durham Thundercats	2 – 4	Ripley Wolves	Ripley-Huron Complex	Recap
Justin Graham (7) - sh - 10:57		First period	No scoring
Luke Eurig (7) - pp - 10:44		Second period	17:24 - pp - Ethan Skinner (4)
No scoring		Third period	15:49 - pp - Garrett Meurs (8); 6:04 - pp - JD Falconer (4); 0:55 - en - Jarred Colling (3)
Brendon Landry (5-3)		Goalie stats	Garrett Golley; Jason Hamilton (4-1)

March 13	Durham Thundercats	6 – 3	Ripley Wolves	Ripley-Huron Complex	Recap
No scoring		First period	4:57 - Ethan Skinner (5)
Luke Eurig (8) - 19:35; Matthew Prucha (1) - 19:16		Second period	No scoring
Luke Richardson (1) - pp - 14:35; Brody LeBlanc (7) - 5:29; Brody LeBlanc (8) - en - 1:25; Aidan Doig (1) - en - 0:56		Third period	6:18 - pp - Garrett Meurs (9); 2:02 - Ethan Skinner (6)
Brendon Landry (6-3)		Goalie stats	Jason Hamilton (4-2)

March 14	Ripley Wolves	1 – 6	Durham Thundercats	Durham Community Centre	Recap
Ethan Skinner (7) - 4:47		First period	19:05 - Kyle Maloney (5); 12:35 - Brandon Devlin (1)
No scoring		Second period	15:05 - Brody LeBlanc (9); 4:51 - sh - Brandon Devlin (2)
No scoring		Third period	7:14 - pp - Luke Richardson (2); 1:47 - sh - Luke Richardson (3)
Jason Hamilton (4-3)		Goalie stats	Brendon Landry (7-3)

March 15	Durham Thundercats	3 – 5	Ripley Wolves	Ripley-Huron Complex	Recap
No scoring		First period	15:01 - Carter Servais (7); 0:01 - Trent Houghton (1)
No scoring		Second period	6:36 - Dan Nicoloff (7)
Ryan Colquhoun (5) - 18:07; Justin Graham (8) - pp - 7:45; Luke Eurig (9) - 2:42		Third period	9:52 - pp - Carter Servais (8); 0:27 - en - Kaden Hoggarth (5)
Brendon Landry (7-4); Vance Meyer		Goalie stats	Jason Hamilton (5-3)

Ripley wins series 4 – 3

====== (2) Minto 81's vs. (3) Elmvale Harvesters ======
February 28	Elmvale Harvesters	2 – 3	Minto 81's	Palmerston Community Centre	Recap
Jacob Kelly (10) - pp - 13:31		First period	18:56 - Caleb Warren (5)
No scoring		Second period	4:56 - pp - Chayse Herffort (2)
Riley Pitt (5) - pp - 1:23		Third period	16:14 - Caleb Warren (6)
Noah Featherstonhaugh-Gowe (4-1)		Goalie stats	Jonathan Reinhart (3-0)

March 1	Minto 81's	5 – 2	Elmvale Harvesters	Elmvale Community Centre	Recap
Jordan Alexander (4) - 8:57; Brenden Clayton (2) - sh - 8:36		First period	17:17 - Ryan Hackett (1)
Payton McIsaac (1) - 10:24		Second period	9:03 - pp - Riley Pitt (6)
Trent Verbeek (1) - sh - 3:23; Eric Margo (2) - sh - en - 0:13		Third period	No scoring
Jonathan Reinhart (4-0)		Goalie stats	Noah Featherstonhaugh-Gowe (4-2)

March 7	Elmvale Harvesters	4 – 6	Minto 81's	Palmerston Community Centre	Recap
No scoring		First period	19:07 - Keaton Willis (5); 7:18 - sh - Chayse Herffort (3); 2:16 - Aidan Yarde (2)
Austin Pope (2) - 17:51; Riley Pitt (7) - 2:30		Second period	7:35 - pp - Jordan Alexander (5); 1:34 - Ted Nichol (1)
Jacob Kelly (11) - 12:52; Derek Sweeney (1) - 7:57		Third period	0:25 - en - Ted Nichol (2)
Noah Featherstonhaugh-Gowe (4-3); Andrew Best		Goalie stats	Jonathan Reinhart (5-0)

March 8	Minto 81's	8 – 1	Elmvale Harvesters	Elmvale Community Centre	Recap
Liam Hurley (4) - 18:08; Stephen Gibson (4) - 10:57		First period	No scoring
Caleb Warren (7) - 13:16; Caleb Warren (8) - 10:29; Chayse Herffort (4) - 5:16; Chayse Herffort (5) - 1:08		Second period	13:38 - Jacob Kelly (12)
Colton Henderson (1) - 8:40; Chayse Herffort (6) - pp - 7:45		Third period	No scoring
Jonathan Reinhart (6-0)		Goalie stats	Andrew Best (0-1); Adam Redgate

Minto wins series 4 – 0

===== South conference semi-finals =====
====== (1) Seaforth Centenaires vs. (5) Tavistock Royals ======
February 28	Tavistock Royals	4 – 0	Seaforth Centenaires	Seaforth Community Centre	Recap
Erik Robichaud (1) - pp - 12:28; Erik Robichaud (2) - 2:08		First period	No scoring
No scoring		Second period	No scoring
Tyler Reid (1) - sh - 4:23; Patrick Vulgan (2) - 0:22		Third period	No scoring
Andrew Masters (5-0)		Goalie stats	Alex Hutcheson (4-1)

March 1	Seaforth Centenaires	4 – 3	OT	Tavistock Royals	Tavistock Recreation Centre	Recap
No scoring		First period		3:51 - Tyler Reid (2)
Sean Chisholm (4) - pp - 15:13; Kyle Stanbury (4) - 13:37		Second period		18:24 - pp - Drew Gerth (6)
Kyle Stanbury (5) - 12:38		Third period		7:07 - Tyler Reid (3)
Jared Nash (5) - 16:25		First overtime period		No scoring
Alex Hutcheson (5-1)		Goalie stats		Andrew Masters (5-1)

March 7	Tavistock Royals	1 – 2	Seaforth Centenaires	Seaforth Community Centre	Recap
Lucas Bast (2) - pp - 8:12		First period	No scoring
No scoring		Second period	13:07 - pp - Camden Daigle (4); 0:50 - Camden Daigle (5)
No scoring		Third period	No scoring
Andrew Masters (5-2)		Goalie stats	Alex Hutcheson (6-1)

March 8	Seaforth Centenaires	4 – 5	OT	Tavistock Royals	Tavistock Recreation Centre	Recap
Jordan Visneskie (1) - pp - 14:37; Jared Nash (6) - 7:14; Kyle Stanbury (6) - 4:21		First period		18:08 - Drew Gerth (7); 17:16 - Michael Capicotto (1)
Kyle Stanbury (7) - 13:10		Second period		17:42 - Tristan Hohl (2); 4:54 - pp - Mitch Atkins (2)
No scoring		Third period		No scoring
No scoring		First overtime period		8:12 - Patrick Vulgan (3)
Alex Hutcheson (6-2)		Goalie stats		Andrew Masters (6-2)

March 13	Tavistock Royals	2 – 6	Seaforth Centenaires	Seaforth Community Centre	Recap
Sean Kienapple (2) - pp - 6:00		First period	12:22 - Jordan Visneskie (2)
Drew Gerth (8) - 11:50		Second period	15:11 - pp - Sean Chisholm (5); 13:52 - pp - Kyle Stanbury (8); 10:44 - Ray Huether (2); 4:41 - Camden Daigle (6)
No scoring		Third period	7:34 - Jared Nash (7)
Andrew Masters (6-3)		Goalie stats	Alex Hutcheson (7-2)

March 14	Seaforth Centenaires	1 – 3	Tavistock Royals	Tavistock Recreation Centre	Recap
No scoring		First period	12:48 - Mitch Atkins (3); 3:05 - Mitch Atkins (4)
Kyle Stanbury (9) - 0:38		Second period	No scoring
No scoring		Third period	0:21 - Deven Kropf (5)
Alex Hutcheson (7-3)		Goalie stats	Andrew Masters (7-3)

March 17	Tavistock Royals	1 – 3	Seaforth Centenaires	Seaforth Community Centre	Recap
No scoring		First period	No scoring
No scoring		Second period	17:32- Jarrett Bodgon (4); 9:02 - Cameron Daigle (7)
Matt Zilke (1) - 6:35		Third period	1:14 - Sheldon Pryce (3)
Andrew Masters (7-4)		Goalie stats	Alex Hutcheson (8-3)

Seaforth wins series 4 – 3

====== (2) Petrolia Squires vs. (3) Elora Rocks ======
February 27	Elora Rocks	3 – 5	Petrolia Squires	Greenwood Arena	Recap
No scoring		First period	14:04 - T.J. Harris (5); 3:20 - Josh Barraclough (2)
Andrew Merrett (3) - pp - 10:45		Second period	11:08 - sh - Joel Pavey (1)
Jamie Collins (2) - 11:33; Jamie Collins (3) - 8:37		Third period	9:33 - Curtis Helps (3); 0:02 - T.J. Harris (6)
Colin Dunne (3-2)		Goalie stats	Jakob Knowles (5-1)

February 28	Petrolia Squires	1 – 5	Elora Rocks	Jefferson Community Centre	Recap
No scoring		First period	18:41 - Mark McIntosh (4); 8:04 - Ethan Broderick (2)
Derek Folkard (1) - 13:05		Second period	4:28 - pp - Mark McIntosh (5)
No scoring		Third period	7:17 - pp - Zack Cameron (7); 1:51 - en - Zack Cameron (8)
Jakob Knowles (5-2)		Goalie stats	Colin Dunne (4-2)

March 6	Petrolia Squires	0 – 5	Elora Rocks	Jefferson Community Centre	Recap
No scoring		First period	2:16 - Brayden Krieger (4)
No scoring		Second period	14:58 - Alex Uttley (5); 6:59 - sh - Jay Grant-Hose (1)
No scoring		Third period	14:17 - Charlie Stephens (1); 2:21 - Jamie Collins (4)
Nolan Dekoning (0-1)		Goalie stats	Colin Dunne (5-2); Matt Woroniuk

March 8	Elora Rocks	7 – 3	Petrolia Squires	Greenwood Arena	Recap
Alex Uttley (6) - 17:49; Alex Uttley (7) - 5:57		First period	1:07 - Joey Ferrera (1)
Zack Cameron (9) - 0:30		Second period	13:51 - Curtis Helps (4)
Zack Cameron (10) - 15:11; Jacob Black (2) - 10:23; Jacob Black (3) - 2:07; Mark McIntosh (6) - 1:54		Third period	18:38 - Curtis Helps (5)
Colin Dunne (6-2)		Goalie stats	Jakob Knowles (5-3)

March 13	Elora Rocks	4 – 3	OT	Petrolia Squires	Greenwood Arena	Recap
Jamie Collins (5) - 19:04		First period		No scoring
Mark McIntosh (7) - 18:57		Second period		18:03 - Isaac McLean (2); 1:16 - Corey Pawley (1)
Alex Uttley (8) - 14:29		Third period		2:32 - Corey Pawley (2)
Jacob Black (4) - 17:09		First overtime period		No scoring
Colin Dunne (7-2)		Goalie stats		Jakob Knowles (5-4)

Elora wins series 4 – 1

==== Conference finals ====
===== North conference finals =====
====== (1) Ripley Wolves vs. (2) Minto 81's ======
Note: Game four was played at the Steve Kerr Memorial Complex in Listowel, Ontario
Note: Ripley awarded a 5–0 win in game six due to Minto playing an illegal player.

March 20	Minto 81's	4 – 2	Ripley Wolves	Ripley-Huron Complex	Recap
Liam Hurley (5) - 15:36		First period	No scoring
Ted Nichol (3) - sh - 16:09; Stephen Gibson (5) - 2:10		Second period	15:06 - Pat Looby (2); 2:30 - Ethan Skinner (8)
Ted Nichol (4) - pp - 11:54		Third period	No scoring
Jonathan Reinhart (7-0)		Goalie stats	Jason Hamilton (5-4)

March 21	Ripley Wolves	4 – 1	Minto 81's	Palmerston Community Centre	Recap
Pat Looby (3) - 14:57		First period	No scoring
No scoring		Second period	No scoring
Carter Servais (9) - pp - 14:38; Cody Britton (6) - pp - 9:50; Trent Houghton (2) - en - 1:39		Third period	4:49 - pp - Keaton Willis (6)
Jason Hamilton (6-4)		Goalie stats	Jonathan Reinhart (7-1)

March 27	Minto 81's	6 – 2	Ripley Wolves	Ripley-Huron Complex	Recap
Ted Nichol (5) - pp - 7:41		First period	15:01 - Ethan Skinner (9)
Keaton Willis (7) - pp - 8:04		Second period	11:12 - Ethan Skinner (10)
Stephen Gibson (6) - sh - 13:03; Chayse Herffort (7) - 7:07; Keaton Willis (8) - pp - 2:13; Brenden Clayton (3) - en - 1:54		Third period	No scoring
Jonathan Reinhart (8-1)		Goalie stats	Jason Hamilton (6-5)

March 28	Ripley Wolves	3 – 2	OT	Minto 81's	Palmerston Community Centre	Recap
Keaton McLaughlin (1) - 15:55		First period		No scoring
No scoring		Second period		2:03 - Caleb Warren (9)
Cody Britton (7) - 17:55		Third period		6:44 - Chayse Herffort (8)
Garrett Meurs (10) - 18:24		First overtime period		No scoring
Jason Hamilton (7-5)		Goalie stats		Jonathan Reinhart (8-2)

April 3	Minto 81's	0 – 3	Ripley Wolves	Ripley-Huron Complex	Recap
No scoring		First period	No scoring
No scoring		Second period	17:05 - Aidan Renaud (1)
No scoring		Third period	19:23 - Jordan Moulton (5); 6:36 - pp - Ethan Skinner (11)
Jonathan Reinhart (8-3)		Goalie stats	Jason Hamilton (8-5)

April 4	Ripley Wolves	5 – 0	Minto 81's	Palmerston Community Centre	Recap
Dan Nicoloff (8) - pp - 6:20; Ethan Skinner (12) - 4:11		First period	14:06 - Mason Kohn (2); 10:51 - sh - Steven Grant (1)
No scoring		Second period	3:16 - Steven Grant (2)
No scoring		Third period	3:01 - Blair Butchart (2); 1:45 - en - Caleb Warren (10)
Jason Hamilton (9-5)		Goalie stats	Derek Hartley (0-1)

Ripley wins series 4 – 2

===== South conference finals =====
====== (1) Seaforth Centenaires vs. (3) Elora Rocks ======
Note: Game four was played at the Centre Wellington Sportsplex in Fergus, Ontario.

March 21	Elora Rocks	4 – 1	Seaforth Centenaires	Seaforth Community Centre	Recap
No scoring		First period	No scoring
Klayton Hoelscher (5) - 15:39; Klayton Hoelscher (6) - 9:55		Second period	No scoring
Mark McIntosh (7) - pp - 16:38; Alex Uttley (8) - 1:52		Third period	7:12 - pp - Reuben Smith (1)
Colin Dunne (8-2)		Goalie stats	Alex Hutcheson (8-4)

March 27	Seaforth Centenaires	5 – 4	3OT	Elora Rocks	Jefferson Community Centre	Recap
Jordan Visneskie (3) - 16:26; Braydon Blight (1) - 13:11		First period		15:59 - Mark McIntosh (8); 14:23 - Brayden Krieger (6)
Jarrett Bogdon (5) - 8:55		Second period		0:33 - Mark McIntosh (9)
Camden Daigle (8) - 7:23		Third period		12:42 - Charlie Stephens (2)
Jared Nash (8) - 15:01		Third overtime period		No scoring
Alex Hutcheson (9-4)		Goalie stats		Colin Dunne (8-3)

March 29	Elora Rocks	1 – 5	Seaforth Centenaires	Seaforth Community Centre	Recap
Brayden Krieger (7) - 11:34		First period	13:07 - Camden Daigle (9); 12:14 - Jared Nash (9)
No scoring		Second period	0:39 - Jordan Visneskie (4)
No scoring		Third period	9:08 - Jordan Visneskie (5); 6:37 - Sheldon Pryce (4)
Colin Dunne (8-4)		Goalie stats	Alex Hutcheson (10-4)

April 2	Seaforth Centenaires	5 – 3	Elora Rocks	Jefferson Community Centre	Recap
Kyle Stanbury (10) - 8:45		First period	18:56 - Jacob Black (5); 17:32 - Alex Uttley (9)
Camden Daigle (10) - 16:52		Second period	11:58 - Charlie Stephens (3)
Reid Oliver (3) - 18:29; Kyle Stanbury (11) - 4:13; Jamie Huber (1) - en - 0:45		Third period	No scoring
Alex Hutcheson (11-4)		Goalie stats	Colin Dunne (8-5)

April 4	Elora Rocks	1 – 3	Seaforth Centenaires	Seaforth Community Centre	Recap
No scoring		First period	5:19 - Camden Daigle (11)
Steve Dol (3) - pp - 10:03		Second period	19:36 - Jamie Huber (2); 12:44 - sh - Ray Huether (3)
No scoring		Third period	No scoring
Colin Dunne (8-6)		Goalie stats	Alex Hutcheson (12-4)

Seaforth wins series 4 – 1

==== OEHL finals ====
===== J.F. Paxton Trophy finals =====
====== (N1) Ripley Wolves vs. (S1) Seaforth Centenaires ======
April 10	Seaforth Centenaires	3 – 0	Ripley Wolves	Ripley-Huron Complex	Recap
Jared Nash (10) - pp - 9:08		First period	No scoring
Camden Daigle (12) - 17:34		Second period	No scoring
Jared Nash (11) - pp - 4:43		Third period	No scoring
Alex Hutcheson (13-4)		Goalie stats	Jason Hamilton (9-6)

April 11	Ripley Wolves	2 – 3	Seaforth Centenaires	Seaforth Community Centre	Recap
Cody Britton (8) - 8:24		First period	2:58 - Sean Chisholm (6)
Garrett Meurs (11) - 13:24		Second period	12:50 - Camden Daigle (13)
No scoring		Third period	7:39 - Luke Fritz (1)
Jason Hamilton (9-7)		Goalie stats	Alex Hutcheson (14-4)

April 18	Seaforth Centenaires	3 – 4	Ripley Wolves	Ripley-Huron Complex	Recap
No scoring		First period	8:26 - Cody Britton (9); 6:30 - pp - Garrett Meurs (12); 5:12 - Keaton McLaughlin (2)
No scoring		Second period	16:36 - Trent Houghton (3)
Camden Daigle (14) - 16:31; Sean Chisholm (7) - 9:42; Ray Huether (4) - 4:40		Third period	No scoring
Alex Hutcheson (14-5)		Goalie stats	Jason Hamilton (10-7)

April 19	Ripley Wolves	4 – 5	OT	Seaforth Centenaires	Seaforth Community Centre	Recap
Matthew Murray (1) - 6:19; JD Falconer (5) - 0:36		First period		8:16 - Jordan Visneskie (6)
No scoring		Second period		11:14 - Sheldon Pryce (5); 7:58 - Luke Fritz (2)
Carter Servais (10) - pp - 5:27; Ethan Skinner (13) - 1:16		Third period		8:31 - Luke Fritz (3)
No scoring		First overtime period		1:10 - Reuben Smith (2)
Jason Hamilton (10-8)		Goalie stats		Alex Hutcheson (15-5)

April 25	Seaforth Centenaires	2 – 3	OT	Ripley Wolves	Ripley-Huron Complex	Recap
Matthew Murray (2) - 9:10		First period		17:21 - pp - Ray Huether (5)
No scoring		Second period		No scoring
Camden Daigle (15) - 16:56		Third period		15:46 - Garrett Meurs (13)
No scoring		First overtime period		14:21 - JD Falconer (6)
Alex Hutcheson (15-6)		Goalie stats		Jason Hamilton (11-8)

April 26	Ripley Wolves	3 – 5	Seaforth Centenaires	Seaforth Community Centre	Recap
Dan Nicoloff (9) - pp - 10:36		First period	No scoring
Garrett Meurs (14) - 10:20		Second period	4:49 - Kyle Stanbury (12)
Ethan Skinner (14) - 11:03		Third period	18:49 - pp - Ray Huether (6); 5:57 - Reuben Smith (3); 2:20 - Camden Daigle (16); 0:34 - en - Sean Chisholm (8)
Jason Hamilton (11-9)		Goalie stats	Alex Hutcheson (16-6)

Seaforth wins series 4 – 2

=== Hugh McLean Trophy playoffs ===
Following the J.F. Paxton Trophy conference quarter-finals, the Erin Outlaws, Saugeen Shores Winterhawks, Shelburne Muskies and Tillsonburg Thunder announced that they would play in the "A" playoffs.

The Saugeen Shores Winterhawks won the Hugh McLean Trophy, sweeping the Tillsonburg Thunder in the final round.

==== Hugh McLean Trophy playoff bracket ====
McLean Trophy semi-finals
N1	Saugeen Shores	4
N2	Shelburne	0
S1	Erin	3
S2	Tillsonburg	4

McLean Trophy finals
N1	Saugeen Shores	4
S2	Tillsonburg	0

==== McLean Trophy semi-finals ====
===== North conference finals =====
====== (1) Saugeen Shores Winterhawks vs. (2) Shelburne Muskies ======
February 27	Shelburne Muskies	3 – 8	Saugeen Shores Winterhawks	The Plex	Recap
No scoring		First period	18:24 - Miles MacLean (4); 16:41 - Rob Flick (2); 4:08 - Justin Marlowe (2)
Jack Beck (1) - 14:02; Chris Webber (5) - 10:14		Second period	4:10 - Ethan Froats (1); 3:45 - Todd Hellyer (2)
Vincent DeCastro (1) - 9:39		Third period	5:35 - Ethan Froats (2); 4:40 - Josh Urbshott (3); 0:16 - Rob Flick (3)
Chris LaVine (0-1)		Goalie stats	Eric Peicheff (1-0)

March 1	Saugeen Shores Winterhawks	8 – 3	Shelburne Muskies	Centre Dufferin Complex	Recap
Ethan Froats (3) - 18:24; Clayton Fitzsimmons (1) - 7:43; Mike Fiegehen (1) - 0:06		First period	9:19 - Chris Webber (6)
Rob Flick (4) - 6:32		Second period	16:41 - Carter Leroux (2)
Mike Fiegehen (2) - 11:38; Rob Flick (5) - 6:22; Josh Urbshott (4) - 4:10; Logan Freiburger (1) - 1:38		Third period	3:10 - Keith Palmer (8)
Eric Peicheff (2-0)		Goalie stats	Gatlin Burt (0-3)

March 6	Shelburne Muskies	2 – 14	Saugeen Shores Winterhawks	The Plex	Recap
No scoring		First period	15:36 - Ethan Froats (4); 10:35 - Josh Urbshott (5); 9:48 - Brent MacDermid (1); 6:55 - Trevor Donaldson (2)
Jack Beck (2) - 14:30		Second period	16:53 - Trevor Donaldson (3); 9:54 - pp - Brent MacDermid (2); 8:28 - Miles MacLean (5); 6:30 - Brent MacDermid (3); 4:52 - Brent MacDermid (4); 0:43 - Miles MacLean (6); 0:04 - Rob Flick (6)
Keith Palmer (9) - 17:22		Third period	16:25 - Trevor Donaldson (4); 15:14 - Miles MacLean (7); 10:19 - Spencer Sutter (1)
Dominic Marquis (1-4)		Goalie stats	Eric Peicheff (3-0)

March 7	Saugeen Shores Winterhawks	7 – 4	Shelburne Muskies	Centre Dufferin Complex	Recap
Mike Fiegehen (3) - pp - 3:39		First period	18:17 - Matthew Migone (1)
Hudson Wiles (1) - 16:19; Spencer Sutter (2) - 12:36; Josh Urbshott (6) - pp - 8:22		Second period	17:50 - Devin Train (2); 11:22 - Keith Palmer (10)
Hudson Wiles (2) - 17:59; Miles MacLean (8) - 12:57; Hudson Wiles (3) - 0:36		Third period	13:46 - pp - Keith Palmer (11)
Tyler Jackman (1-0)		Goalie stats	Reilly Hope (0-1)

Saugeen Shores wins series 4 – 0

===== South conference finals =====
====== (1) Erin Outlaws vs. (2) Tillsonburg Thunder ======
February 28	Erin Outlaws	4 – 2	Tillsonburg Thunder	Tillsonburg Community Centre	Recap
No scoring		First period	No scoring
Callum Fryer (1) - 17:24; Anthony Novielli (1) - 2:45		Second period	11:18 - Kane Johnson (1)
Jacob Miller (1) - 1:49; Chris Martin (1) - en - 0:33		Third period	6:29 - Hunter Monkhouse (4)
Tyson Gustaw (1-2)		Goalie stats	Ben Blacker (1-5)

March 1	Tillsonburg Thunder	3 – 1	Erin Outlaws	Centre 2000	Recap
Robert MacLean (1) - 9:50		First period	No scoring
Andrew Oosterveld (2) - 6:05		Second period	14:39 - sh - Chris Martin (2)
Luke Sinclair (2) - 0:09		Third period	No scoring
Zack Johnston (1-0)		Goalie stats	Connor Toogood (0-1)

March 6	Erin Outlaws	6 – 5	Tillsonburg Thunder	Tillsonburg Community Centre	Recap
Chris Martin (3) - 18:23		First period	6:15 - pp - Danny Attridge (2); 5:04 - pp - Kane Johnson (2); 3:39 - Andrew Oosterveld (3)
Anthony Novielli (2) - 9:48; Tye Campbell (1) - 2:24; Jacob Miller (2) - 1:24		Second period	No scoring
Nick Giamou (1) - 10:42; Tye Campbell (2) - en - 1:36		Third period	9:44 - Andrew Oosterveld (4); 1:24 - Robert MacLean (2)
Tyson Gustaw (2-2)		Goalie stats	Zack Johnston (1-1)

March 7	Tillsonburg Thunder	4 – 5	Erin Outlaws	Centre 2000	Recap
Danny Attridge (3) - 17:21		First period	10:13 - pp - Chris Martin (4); 4:30 - Liam Buckley (1)
Danny Attridge (4) - 13:50		Second period	2:55 - Jacob Miller (3)
Matthew Oosterveld (1) - 18:54; Danny Attridge (5) - 16:40		Third period	14:17 - Liam Buckley (2); 1:36 - pp - Liam Galton (1)
Zack Johnston (1-2)		Goalie stats	Tyson Gustaw (3-2)

March 14	Tillsonburg Thunder	4 – 3	OT	Erin Outlaws	Centre 2000	Recap
Symon Reddin (1) - 18:16		First period		8:51 - Chris Martin (5); 7:29 - Tye Campbell (3)
Andrew Oosterveld (5) - 18:43; Luke Sinclair (3) - 1:06		Second period		16:50 - pp - Jacob Miller (4)
No scoring		Third period		No scoring
Luke Sinclair (4) - 4:59		First overtime period		No scoring
Ben Blacker (2-5)		Goalie stats		Tyson Gustaw (3-3)

March 15	Erin Outlaws	3 – 5	Tillsonburg Thunder	Tillsonburg Community Centre	Recap
Liam Buckley (3) - 9:26		First period	10:50 - pp - Justin Abraham (2); 8:50 - Andrew Oosterveld (6)
Sean Golebiowski (1) - 11:40		Second period	17:56 - Andrew Oosterveld (7); 6:41 - Kane Johnson (3)
Tye Campbell (4) - 17:49		Third period	5:20 - Andrew Oosterveld (8)
Connor Toogood (0-2)		Goalie stats	Ben Blacker (3-5)

March 16	Tillsonburg Thunder	5 – 2	Erin Outlaws	Centre 2000	Recap
Luke Sinclair (5) - 10:42; Luke Sinclair (6) - pp - 3:23		First period	12:14 - Liam Galton (2)
Nicolas D'Agostino (3) - pp - 16:08		Second period	No scoring
Nicolas D'Agostino (4) - 12:06; Matthew Oosterveld (2) - 9:15		Third period	2:23 - Callum Fryer (2)
Ben Blacker (4-5)		Goalie stats	Tyson Gustaw (3-4)

Tillsonburg wins series 4 – 3

==== McLean Trophy finals ====
===== (N1) Saugeen Shores Winterhawks vs. (S2) Tillsonburg Thunder =====
March 20	Tillsonburg Thunder	2 – 10	Saugeen Shores Winterhawks	The Plex	Recap
Matthew Oosterveld (3) - pp - 5:35		First period	13:13 - Trevor Donaldson (5); 8:41 - pp - Luke Pither (2); 4:37 - Luke Pither (3); 3:37 - Wyatt McNabb (1)
Kurtis Heggie (1) - 8:10		Second period	19:14 - Rob Flick (7); 13:10 - Brent MacDermid (5); 11:30 - Rob White (1); 3:01 - pp - Wyatt McNabb (2); 1:54 - Dylan Becker (1)
No scoring		Third period	8:25 - pp - Rob Flick (8)
Ben Blacker (4-6)		Goalie stats	Eric Peicheff (4-0)

March 21	Saugeen Shores Winterhawks	4 – 3	OT	Tillsonburg Thunder	Tillsonburg Community Centre	Recap
Hudson Wiles (4) - pp - 0:30		First period		10:03 - Andrew Oosterveld (9); 5:40 - Kane Johnson (4)
Miles MacLean (9) - 1:00		Second period		No scoring
Mike Fiegehen (4) - 0:12		Third period		17:52 - Kane Johnston (5)
Hudson Wiles (5) - 14:49		First overtime period		No scoring
Clayton Fritsch (1-4); Eric Peicheff		Goalie stats		Ben Blacker (4-7)

March 28	Tillsonburg Thunder	2 – 11	Saugeen Shores Winterhawks	The Plex	Recap
No scoring		First period	12:57 - Miles MacLean (10); 12:17 - Rob Flick (9); 0:17 - Justin Marlowe (3)
Luke Sinclair (7) - 4:07		Second period	16:12 - Justin Donnelly (1); 14:03 - Rob Flick (10); 11:31 - sh - Rob Flick (11); 6:20 - Brent MacDermid (6); 5:08 - Justin Marlowe (4); 1:23 - pp - Brent MacDermid (7)
Danny Attridge (6) - 16:45		Third period	13:07 - Rob Flick (12); 2:56 - Hudson Wiles (6)
Spencer Robertson (0-1)		Goalie stats	Clayton Fritsch (2-4)

April 4	Saugeen Shores Winterhawks	9 – 6	Tillsonburg Thunder	Tillsonburg Community Centre	Recap
Trevor Donaldson (6) - 17:22; Mike Fiegehen (5) - 13:41; Miles MacLean (11) - 11:16; Trevor Donaldson (7) - 9:25; Curtis Johnston (1) - 9:06; Mike Fiegehen (6) - 1:46		First period	17:04 - Cory Mallet (1); 3:12 - Kane Johnson (6)
Miles MacLean (12) - 3:48		Second period	12:31 - Tye Johnson (1); 9:33 - Hunter Monkhouse (5)
Hudson Wiles (7) - pp - 6:39; Justin Marlowe (5) - 5:59		Third period	5:25 - Symon Reddin (2)
Eric Peicheff (5-0)		Goalie stats	Spencer Robertson (0-2)

Saugeen Shores wins series 4 – 0

=== Playoff scoring leaders ===
Note: GP = Games played; G = Goals; A = Assists; Pts = Points; PIM = Penalty minutes

Player	Team	GP	G	A	Pts	PIM
Camden Daigle	Seaforth Centenaires	21	16	15	31	28
Rob Flick	Saugeen Shores Winterhawks	8	12	19	31	14
Garrett Meurs	Ripley Wolves	22	14	16	30	52
Miles MacLean	Saugeen Shores Winterhawks	12	12	17	29	0
Ethan Skinner	Ripley Wolves	22	14	13	27	32
Brent MacDermid	Saugeen Shores Winterhawks	12	7	20	27	0
Cody Britton	Ripley Wolves	22	9	16	25	22
Jared Nash	Seaforth Centenaires	21	11	13	24	2
Mark McIntosh	Elora Rocks	12	9	13	22	10
Brody LeBlanc	Durham Thundercats	11	9	12	21	8

=== Playoff leading goaltenders ===
Note: GP = Games played; Mins = Minutes played; W = Wins; L = Losses: OTL = Overtime losses;
SL = Shootout losses; GA = Goals Allowed; SO = Shutouts; GAA = Goals against average

Player	Team	GP	MINS	W	L	GA	SO	GAA
Andrew Masters	Tavistock Royals	11	675	7	4	21	4	1.87
Jonathan Reinhart	Minto 81's	11	661	8	3	23	1	2.09
Alex Hutcheson	Seaforth Centenaires	22	1363	16	6	56	1	2.47
Colin Dunne	Elora Rocks	14	832	8	6	43	1	3.10
Jason Hamilton	Ripley Wolves	20	1207	11	9	64	1	3.18

== Awards ==
On March 18, 2026, the OEHL announced the regular season award winners.

2025–26 OEHL Regular Season Awards
Award	North Conference	South Conference
Most Valuable Player	Kyler Nixon, Durham Thundercats	Alex Hutcheson, Seaforth Centenaires
Most Sportsmanlike Player	Kyler Nixon, Durham Thundercats	Andrew Tapsell, Delhi Flames
Top Scorer Award	Brody LeBlanc, Durham Thundercats	Alex Uttley, Elora Rocks
Lowest Goals Against	Garrett Golley & Jason Hamilton, Ripley Wolves	Alex Hutcheson & Tyler Parr, Seaforth Centenaires
