= Elmvale Harvesters =

Canadian hockey team

- City: Elmvale, Ontario, Canada
- League: Ontario Elite Hockey League
- Home arena: Elmvale Community Arena
- Colours: Blue and Beige
- General manager: Jared Robertson
- Head coach: Andrew Shipley
- Website: elmvaleharvesters.com

The Elmvale Harvesters are a senior hockey team based out of Elmvale, Ontario, Canada. They play in the Ontario Elite Hockey League.

== History ==
On June 6, 2025, the Ontario Elite Hockey League announced that the Harvesters were approved as an expansion team and will join the OEHL for the 2025-26 season.

The Harvesters name pays tribute to Elmvale’s hockey and farming tradition. It carries on the name of an Intermediate team that played in Elmvale in the 1950s and 60s.

== Season-by-season record ==
Note: GP = Games played, W = Wins, L = Losses, OTL = Overtime Losses, Pts = Points, GF = Goals for, GA = Goals against

Season	GP	W	L	OTL	GF	GA	PTS	Finish	Playoffs
2025-26	20	14	5	1	116	89	29	3rd in North	Won in divisional quarter-finals (4-0 vs. Applekings); Lost in division semi-finals (0-4 vs. 81's)

== Related links ==
- Elmvale, Ontario
- Ontario Elite Hockey League
