= Erin Outlaws =

Canadian hockey team

- City: Erin, Ontario, Canada
- League: Ontario Elite Hockey League
- Division: North
- Home arena: Erin Community Centre
- Colours: Black, Grey, and White
- General manager: Lee Erwin
- Head coach: Ryan Judge
- Website: erinoutlaws.com

The Erin Outlaws are a senior hockey team based out of Erin, Ontario, Canada. They play in the Ontario Elite Hockey League.

== 2023-24 Outlaws season ==
On August 24, 2023, it was announced by the Ontario Elite Hockey League that the expansion Erin Outlaws would join the newly formed league for its inaugural season in 2023–24.

On October 14, 2023, the Outlaws defeated the Ripley Wolves 5–4 in a shootout in their first ever game and earned their first win. The club clinched the eighth and final post-season berth for the OEHL Cup playoffs, earning a 6-13-1 record in 20 games for 13 points. Jacob Miller led the club with 13 goals and 21 points in 20 games.

In the post-season, the Outlaws were swept in the league quarter-finals by the first place Ripley Wolves in four games. Travis Brown scored four goals in four games, while Jacob Miller scored three goals and earned six points in four games.

== Season-by-season record ==
Note: GP = Games played, W = Wins, L = Losses, OTL = Overtime Losses, Pts = Points, GF = Goals for, GA = Goals against

Season	GP	W	L	OTL	GF	GA	PTS	Finish	Playoffs
2023-24	20	6	13	1	71	104	13	8th OEHL	Lost in OEHL quarter-finals (0-4 vs. Wolves)
2024-25	20	8	9	3	83	100	19	8th OEHL	Lost in Paxton Trophy quarter-finals (0-4 vs. Wolves)
2025-26	20	12	5	3	89	68	27	4th South	Lost in divisional quarter-finals (0-4 vs. Royals); Lost in McLean Trophy semi-finals (3-4 vs. Thunder)

== Related links ==
- Erin, Ontario
- Ontario Elite Hockey League
