= Delhi Flames =

Canadian hockey team

- City: Delhi, Ontario, Canada
- League: Ontario Elite Hockey League
- Home arena: Delhi Arena
- Colours: Red, Orange and White
- General manager: Chris Longthorne
- Head coach: Rob Hutchinson

The Delhi Flames are a senior hockey team based out of Delhi, Ontario, Canada. They play in the Ontario Elite Hockey League.

== History ==
The Flames began play in the Western Ontario Super Hockey League in 2022. The club played three seasons in the WOSHL.

On July 25, 2025, the Ontario Elite Hockey League announced that the Aeros were approved as an expansion team and will join the OEHL for the 2025-26 season.

== Season-by-season record ==
Note: GP = Games played, W = Wins, L = Losses, OTL = Overtime Losses, Pts = Points, GF = Goals for, GA = Goals against

Season	GP	W	L	OTL	GF	GA	PTS	Finish	Playoffs
2025-26	20	0	20	0	21	174	0	9th in South	Lost in preliminary round (0-2 vs. Drives)

== Related links ==
- Delhi, Ontario
- Ontario Elite Hockey League
