= Seaforth Centenaires =

Canadian hockey team

- City: Seaforth, Ontario, Canada
- League: Ontario Elite Hockey League
- Home arena: Seaforth & District Community Centre
- Colours: Green, Yellow, and Black
- Head coach: Andrew van Vliet
- Website: centenaires.ca

Franchise history
- 1995-2014: Goderich Pirates
- 2014-2019: Huron East Centenaires
- 2019-present: Seaforth Centenaires

The Seaforth Centenaires are a senior hockey team based out of Seaforth, Ontario, Canada. They play in the Ontario Elite Hockey League.

== Relocation ==
Following the 2013–14 season, the Goderich Pirates relocated to Seaforth, Ontario and were named the Huron East Centenaires. The team announced they would play their home games at the Seaforth & District Community Centre.

Following the 2018–19 season, Huron East Centenaires were renamed the Seaforth Centenaires.

== Seasons ==
=== 2023-24 ===
The Centenaires joined the Ontario Elite Hockey League for its inaugural season in 2023–24. On October 14, 2023, Creemore defeated the Minto 81's in their first game by a score of 5–2. The Coyotes had successful season, finishing in sixth place in the OEHL with a 12-8-0 record, earning 24 points. Jarrett Bogdon led the team in scoring with 12 goals and 23 points in 19 games. In goal, Alex Hutcheson had a 5-4-0 record in ten games, and led the OEHL with a 1.94 GAA.

In the post-season, the Centenaires lost in the league quarter-finals to the Minto 81's in six games. Carter Collinson and Jamie Huber co-led the team in points with six.

== Season-by-season record ==
Note: GP = Games played, W = Wins, L = Losses, OTL = Overtime Losses, Pts = Points, GF = Goals for, GA = Goals against

| Season | GP | W | L | OTL | GF | GA | PTS | Finish | Playoffs |
|---|---|---|---|---|---|---|---|---|---|
| 2014–15 | 24 | 1 | 22 | 1 | 68 | 188 | 3 | 6th in WOAA South | Lost in "A" quarter-finals round robin (2–3 record) |
| 2015–16 | 24 | 11 | 13 | 0 | 98 | 127 | 22 | 4th in WOAA South | Lost in "AA" quarter-finals (0-4 vs. Radars) |
| 2016–17 | 20 | 10 | 10 | 0 | 72 | 81 | 20 | 9th in WOAA | Won in "A" semi-finals (4-0 vs. Rocks); Lost in "A" finals (3-4 vs. Four Wheel Drives) |
| 2017–18 | 20 | 7 | 13 | 0 | 88 | 110 | 14 | 8th in WOAA | Lost in "AA" quarter-finals (0-4 vs. Radars) |
| 2018–19 | 22 | 12 | 9 | 1 | 125 | 124 | 25 | 7th in WOAA | Lost in "AA" quarter-finals (0-4 vs. Wolves) |
| 2019–20 | 22 | 15 | 5 | 2 | 122 | 77 | 32 | 5th in WOAA | Lost in "AA" quarter-finals (2-4 vs. Radars) |
| 2021–22 | 13 | 10 | 3 | 0 | 58 | 26 | 20 | 2nd in WOAA | Won in "AA" quarter-finals (4-1 vs. Thundercats); Won in "AA" semi-finals (4-1 vs. Royals); Won in "AA" finals (4-1 vs. Radars) |
| 2022–23 | 20 | 17 | 1 | 2 | 104 | 37 | 36 | 1st in WOAA | Won in "AA" quarter-finals (4-0 vs. Thundercats); Lost in "AA" semi-finals (2-4 vs. Royals) |
| 2023–24 | 20 | 12 | 8 | 0 | 82 | 52 | 24 | 6th in OEHL | Lost in OEHL quarter-finals (2-4 vs. 81's) |
| 2024–25 | 20 | 15 | 4 | 1 | 92 | 51 | 31 | 2nd in OEHL | Won in Paxton Trophy quarter-finals (4-0 vs. Applekings); Lost in Paxton Trophy semi-finals (2-4 vs. 81's) |
| 2025–26 | 20 | 15 | 4 | 1 | 103 | 48 | 31 | 1st in South | Won in divisional quarter-finals (4-0 vs. Drives); Won in divisional semi-finals (4-3 vs. Royals); Won in divisional finals (4-1 vs. Rocks); Won Paxton Trophy finals (4-2 vs. Wolves) |

== Related links ==
- Seaforth, Ontario
- Ontario Elite Hockey League
