= Dunnville Aeros =

Canadian hockey team

- City: Dunnville, Ontario, Canada
- League: Ontario Elite Hockey League
- Home arena: Dunnville Memorial Arena
- Colours: Yellow, Black, Blue, Red and White
- Head coach: Paul Powers

The Dunnville Aeros are a senior hockey team based out of Dunnville, Ontario, Canada. They play in the Ontario Elite Hockey League.

== History ==
The Aeros began play in the Western Ontario Super Hockey League in 2023. The club played two seasons in the WOSHL.

On June 6, 2025, the Ontario Elite Hockey League announced that the Aeros were approved as an expansion team and will join the OEHL for the 2025-26 season.

== Season-by-season record ==
Note: GP = Games played, W = Wins, L = Losses, OTL = Overtime Losses, Pts = Points, GF = Goals for, GA = Goals against

Season	GP	W	L	OTL	GF	GA	PTS	Finish	Playoffs
2025-26	20	9	11	0	92	87	18	6th in South	Lost in divisional quarter-finals (1-4 vs. Rocks)

== Related links ==
- Dunnville, Ontario
- Ontario Elite Hockey League
