= Georgian Bay Applekings =

Canadian hockey team

- City: Thornbury, Ontario, Canada
- League: Ontario Elite Hockey League
- Division: North Division
- Home arena: Beaver Valley Community Centre
- Colours: Red, Green, and Sand
- General manager: Greg Rice; Dan Van Kleef
- Head coach: Jack Dawson

The Georgian Bay Applekings are a senior hockey team based out of Thornbury, Ontario, Canada. They play in the Ontario Elite Hockey League.

== Seasons ==
=== 2023–24 Applekings season ===
The Applekings joined the newly formed Ontario Elite Hockey League as an expansion team for the inaugural season of the league in 2023–24.

The Applekings played the Tavistock Royals in their first ever game on October 7, 2023, however, the club was shutout in a 4–0 loss. Georgian Bay would lose their first three games before defeating the Durham Thundercats 5–2 on October 27 for their first ever victory.

Georgian Bay finished the season with a 5-13-2 record, earning 12 points and ninth place in the OEHL. As they did not qualify for the OEHL Cup, the club participated in the Hugh McLean Cup playoffs. Evan Buehler led the team with nine goals and 17 points in 20 games.

In the round-robin portion of the playoffs, the Applekings had a 4–0 record against the Milverton Four Wheel Drives and Lucknow Lancers to qualify for the McLean Cup finals. In the final round, Georgian Bay defeated the Four Wheel Drives in seven games to win the McLean Cup. Mackenzie Fleming led Georgian Bay with seven goals and 17 points in 11 playoff games while Neal Ross had nine goals and 15 points in 11 games.

=== 2024-25 Applekings season ===
Georgian Bay saw an improvement in the regular season, earning a 9-9-2 record for 20 points and seventh place in the OEHL. The club qualified for the J. F. Paxton Trophy playoffs for the first time in franchise history.

During the season, Mackenzie Fleming led the team in scoring, as he recorded nine goals and 30 points, placing him ninth in the league for the most points. Evan Buehler led the team with 12 goals. In goal, Allan Menary started 19 of the Applekings games, posting a 9-8-2 record with a 4.05 GAA. His nine wins ranked third in the league.

In the post-season, the Applekings were swept by the Seaforth Centenaires in four games in the Paxton Trophy quarter-finals. Austin Ulett had a team high four points in the series.

=== 2025-26 Applekings season ===
The Applekings set a franchise record for wins and points in a season during the 2025–26 season, as the club finished with a record of 11–9–0, earning 22 points and 6th place in the North Division.

Mackenzie Fleming led the team with 19 goals, which placed him tied for third in league scoring. Fleming also recorded a team-high 46 points, placing him fifth in OEHL scoring. In goal, Allan Menary posted a record of 8-4-0 with a 4.77 GAA. His eight victories ranked him in a tie for fifth in the league.

In the post-season, the Applekings were swept by the Elmvale Harvesters in the North Division quarter-finals. Mackenzie Fleming scored a team-high three goals and nine points in four games.

== Season-by-season record ==
Note: GP = Games played, W = Wins, L = Losses, OTL = Overtime Losses, Pts = Points, GF = Goals for, GA = Goals against

Season	GP	W	L	OTL	GF	GA	PTS	Finish	Playoffs
2023-24	20	5	13	2	59	108	12	9th OEHL	Won in McLean Cup round-robin (4-0 vs. Lancers & Four Wheel Drives); Won McLean Cup (4-3 vs. Four Wheel Drives)
2024-25	20	9	9	2	95	87	20	7th OEHL	Lost in Paxton Trophy quarter-finals (0-4 vs. Centenaires)
2025-26	20	11	9	0	102	95	22	6th North	Lost in divisional quarter-finals (0-4 vs. Harvesters)

== Related links ==
- Thornbury, Ontario
- Grey County, Ontario
- Ontario Elite Hockey League
