= Ontario Highway 5 =

Former Ontario provincial highway

Highway 5
- A map of Highway 5 Highway 5 Sections decommissioned January 1, 1998 Section maintained as connecting link prior to 1998

Route information
- Maintained by Ministry of Transportation of Ontario
- Length: 14.0 km (8.7 mi)
- Existed: 1920–present

Major junctions
- West end: Highway 8 – Dundas
- East end: Highway 6 – Waterdown

Location
- Country: Canada
- Province: Ontario
- Major cities: Hamilton (Dundas & Waterdown)

Highway system
- Ontario provincial highways; Current; Former; 400-series
← Highway 4	→ Highway 6
Former provincial highways
Highway 5A →

King's Highway 5, commonly referred to as Highway 5 and historically as the Dundas Highway and Governor's Road, is a provincially maintained highway in the Canadian province of Ontario. The east–west highway travels a distance of 12.7 km (7.9 mi) between Highway 8 at Peters Corners, north of Hamilton, and Highway 6 at Clappison's Corners. Prior to several sections being downloaded to the municipalities in which they were located, Highway 5 served as bypass to Highway 2, connecting with it in both Paris and Toronto, a distance of 114.3 km (71.0 mi).

Highway 5 followed a significant piece of Dundas Street (historically also called The Governor's Road), one of two routes constructed under the orders of John Graves Simcoe during his short tenure as Lieutenant Governor of Upper Canada, the other being Yonge Street. The route was designated as part of the provincial highway system in 1920 and numbered as Highway 5 in 1925. Initially it travelled from Toronto to Clappison's Corners before turning south and following what would later become Highway 6 south through Hamilton and onwards to Jarvis. It was redirected west from Clappison's Corners to Peters Corners in 1927, and later to Paris in 1931.

Highway 5 was quickly engulfed by the growing outer suburbs of Toronto in the 1950s and 1960s, which led to various portions being transferred to local jurisdiction (though still signed as connecting links) over the years. The portions within Metropolitan Toronto were transferred in 1954, followed by portions through Mississauga in 1971, 1978 and 1991. By the 1990s, the provincially-maintained route only extended as far east as Highway 403; it was shortened to its present length in 1998.

== Route description ==
An abandoned section of highway lies in the bush next to the current route, north of Greensville.

Highway 5 serves as a short connector between Highway 8 in the west and Highway 6 in the east, and is essentially a continuation of Highway 8. This configuration comes as a result of the truncation of both highways by the Ministry of Transportation of Ontario (MTO). The removed sections were transferred to the jurisdiction of the City of Toronto, the City of Mississauga, Halton Region, the City of Hamilton, the County of Brant, and Oxford County on January 1, 1998. Prior, Highway 5 followed two segments of Dundas Street between Toronto and Paris.

The current route of Highway 5 is almost entirely straight and rural. It passes immediately to the north of the Niagara Escarpment, a World Biosphere Reserve. South of the escarpment, at the western tip of Lake Ontario, is the Dundas district of Hamilton, which was once a separate town within the former Hamilton-Wentworth Region. It is 12.5 kilometres (7.8 mi) between Peters Corners and Clappison's Corners.

Highway 5 begins at a roundabout at the southern end of Highway 8 and the northern end of former Highway 52 in Peters Corners. To the west, the road is now Hamilton Road 5 (which the highway is now designated as beyond both ends of its remaining length through Hamilton). It proceeds westwards towards Paris. Proceeding east, it crosses a ravine, divides a large woodlot and passes through agricultural lands. It crosses Spencer Creek as it approaches Brock Road. Spencer Creek plunges over the nearby escarpment at Webster's Falls. Highway 5 then passes through a rural residential area and returns to a farmland setting. It passes through the rural hamlet of Rock Chapel, and then curves to the left on its final approach to Highway 6. East of Highway 6, the road continues as the eastern section of Hamilton Road 5, and becomes Dundas Street.

The MTO still maintains a 1.1-kilometre (0.68 mi) portion of Dundas Street at the Highway 407 interchange in Burlington, a 400-metre (440 yd) portion at the Highway 403 interchange on the Oakville–Mississauga boundary, and a 1.9-kilometre (1.2 mi) portion at the Highway 427 interchange in Toronto.

== History ==
=== Predecessors ===
Dundas Street is one of the oldest roads in Ontario, created before Confederation when the province was known as Upper Canada (a reference to being upstream from Lower Canada on the St. Lawrence River). Under the orders of the first lieutenant governor of Upper Canada, John Graves Simcoe, Captain Samuel Smith led 100 of the Queen's Rangers to open a road from the head of Lake Ontario (now known as Dundas) to La Tranche (later London) in early 1791. The first 32 kilometres (20 mi) from the lakehead to the Grand River—where the Mohawk village that was home to Joseph Brant was located—were blazed by the rangers by October 25, 1793. Another 75 kilometres (47 mi) were cleared from the Grand River to the forks of the Thames River by the spring of 1794.

In 1795, Asa Danforth, the namesake of Danforth Avenue, opened a road east to the new town of York (now Toronto). These early trails "involved nothing more than clearing a corridor through the bush, leaving the bigger stumps to rot, often detouring around the really big trees." The nature of travel in this period meant that daily movement was limited to several miles, and as a result hotels and taverns were established every few miles. Several of these became the seeds of villages, such as Waterdown, Cooksville and Islington.

=== Designation ===
The high-level bridge over Sixteen Mile Creek opened in 1921, replacing a winding route through the ravine valley that exists today as an access road and park trail.

When the Department of Public Highways of Ontario (DPHO) began taking over the responsibility of roads in 1917, it did not assign route numbers. Highways were instead initially referred to by the major cities they connected. What would become Provincial Highway 5 during the summer of 1925 was initially known as the Hamilton–Jarvis Highway and the Dundas Highway. Throughout the summer of 1920, several roads were taken over by the DPHO through Haldimand County, Wentworth County, Halton County, Peel County and York County. Within Haldimand County, the road between Jarvis and north of Caledonia was taken over (or assumed) by the province on June 24, 1920. Another set of roads were assumed through Wentworth on July 8, connecting with the portion in Haldimand County, through Hamilton to Clappison's Corners and east through Waterdown along Dundas Street. Within Peel, through what is now Mississauga, Dundas Street was assumed on July 22. A portion within York County was assumed through Etobicoke from its western boundary as far east as the village of Islington on July 29. A final segment of Dundas Street, within Halton from Waterdown to what is now Winston Churchill Boulevard, was assumed on July 31. Portions of the route through Caledonia, Hagersville, Jarvis and Hamilton were not assumed by the DPHO.

Several more segments of road were assumed the following year, including two portions on the outskirts of Toronto. On March 16, 3.9 kilometres (2.4 mi) of Dundas Street, between Islington Village (at the modern corners of Dundas, Bloor and Kipling) and the Toronto city limits at Jane Street were assumed by the DPHO. On September 14, another 3.7 kilometres (2.3 mi) of road were assumed along Danforth Avenue, from Sibley Avenue to Kingston Road, via Pinegrove Avenue and Highview Avenue; Danforth Avenue did not continue east of Warden Avenue at this time, and so the DPHO constructed a new railway overpass and extended the route to Kingston Road, opening in 1925.

Within Wentworth County, the construction of the Clappison Cut through the Niagara Escarpment was underway by 1921, with the aim of bypassing the winding old route that is known today as Old Guelph Road. The new route, which travelled straight along the boundary between East and West Flamboro, was assumed on January 12, 1921. The province and the City of Hamilton also constructed several new bridges across Cootes Paradise to create a new northwest entrance into Hamilton. The new entrance, connecting the Toronto–Hamilton Highway (later Highway 2) with the incomplete route up the escarpment to Clappison's Corners, was ceremonially opened by the Minister of Public Works and Highways, Frank Campbell Biggs, on August 23, 1922. The Clappison Cut was completed and paved in 1924.

Clappison Cut construction, 1920–1924

A set of rails were installed to remove excavated earth and rock.

Completed work

The St. George railway crossing prior to reconstruction in 1932

After reconstruction in 1932

Highway 5 and Highway 6 travelled concurrently from Highway 8 (Main Street) in downtown Hamilton to Clappison's Corners when route numbers were assigned in 1925. Highway 5 was 127.4 kilometres (79.2 mi) long at this time. This situation was short lived however, as Highway 5 was redirected west from Clappison's Corners to Peters Corners to meet Highway 8 on May 25, 1927. Highway 6, in turn, assumed the route of Highway 5 south to Jarvis. The route was extended further west in 1930, when the newly-renamed Department of Highways (DHO) assumed the road from Highway 8 at Peters Corners to Highway 24 west of St. George, as well as the Governor's Road between Highway 24 and Highway 2 at Paris. The 19.0-kilometre (11.8 mi) road between Highway 8 and Highway 24, through Beverley and South Dumfries was designated on June 18, while the 6.8-kilometre (4.2 mi) section of the Governor's Road, along the boundary between South Dumfries and Brantford Township, was designated several months later on September 24. These two segments were connected by a concurrency with Highway 24. This brought the length of the route to 114.3 kilometres (71.0 mi), including the approximately 16.1 kilometres (10.0 mi) of Bloor Street and Danforth Avenue between Jane Street and Sibley Avenue, within the Toronto city limits.

=== Paving and improvements ===
An early example of "zone striping" along Highway 5 near Clappison's Corners, which reduced head-on collisions by indicating ideal passing locations, with unobstructed sightlines, to drivers

When the Hamilton–Jarvis Highway and Dundas Street were assumed by the province, they were paved from Islington village west to Summerville (near Dixie Road), but were otherwise gravel throughout. The route was paved between Mount Hope and Hamilton, between Sixteen Mile Creek and Summerville, as well as along Bloor Street from Islington village to Jane Street in 1921. New bridges were also completed over Sixteen Mile Creek and Mimico Creek. In 1923, the remainder of the route between Sixteen Mile Creek and Hamilton, including the new Clappison Cut, was paved. This was followed the next year by the construction of a water-bound macadam surface between Jarvis and Caledonia, completing the hard-surfaced road between Jarvis and Hamilton. That year also saw the completion of a new high-level bridge along Bloor Street over the Humber River, bypassing the old route along Old Mill Road and Old Mill Drive. The bridge was opened ceremoniously by then Minister of Highways—and later premier—George Stewart Henry on November 21, 1924.

When the portion of Highway 5 west of Clappison's Corners was assumed in 1927, it was already paved as far west as the Brock Road, approximately 7 kilometres (4.3 mi). However, the DPHO paved the entire length between Peters Corners and Clappison's Corners in 1928. When the province assumed the remainder of the route to Paris, it began paving the highway west from Peters Corners. Paving was completed for 10 kilometres (6.2 mi) to Troy in 1930 and 1931; another 10 km were completed from Troy to Highway 24 in 1932, including a railway underpass at St. George. The final 6.8 kilometres (4.2 mi) east from Paris to Highway 24 were paved in 1933.

New grade separation between Highway 5 (Danforth Avenue) and Highway 2 (Kingston Road) in Scarborough in 1938

Within Scarborough, the DHO began a project to widen Kingston Road to a dual highway in the mid 1930s, which would ultimately result in the construction of the first segment of Highway 401. This construction began at the intersection of Highway 2 and Highway 5 and proceeded northwest. At the intersection of the two highways, the DHO constructed a new grade-separation around the Scarborough Cenotaph beginning in 1936. the overpass, carrying eastbound traffic from Danforth Avenue onto eastbound Kingston Road, was completed in 1938, though landscaping continued into 1939. This junction remains in place today, almost unchanged since then.

As suburbanization of Toronto encroached on Toronto Township—which would become the town of Mississauga in 1968—the DHO began to widen Highway 5 to four lanes across Peel and Halton in the 1960s, beginning with the section between Highway 10 at Cooksville and Mississauga Road in 1961. In the late 1970s, construction began on Highway 403 through Mississauga. As part of this new freeway, an interchange with Highway 5 was built just east of Ninth Line, on the Oakville–Mississauga boundary. The interchange opened along with the segment of Highway 403 south to the Queen Elizabeth Way at Ford Drive in mid-1981; the freeway was extended north to Erin Mills Parkway on November 17th of that year.

=== Shift of responsibility ===
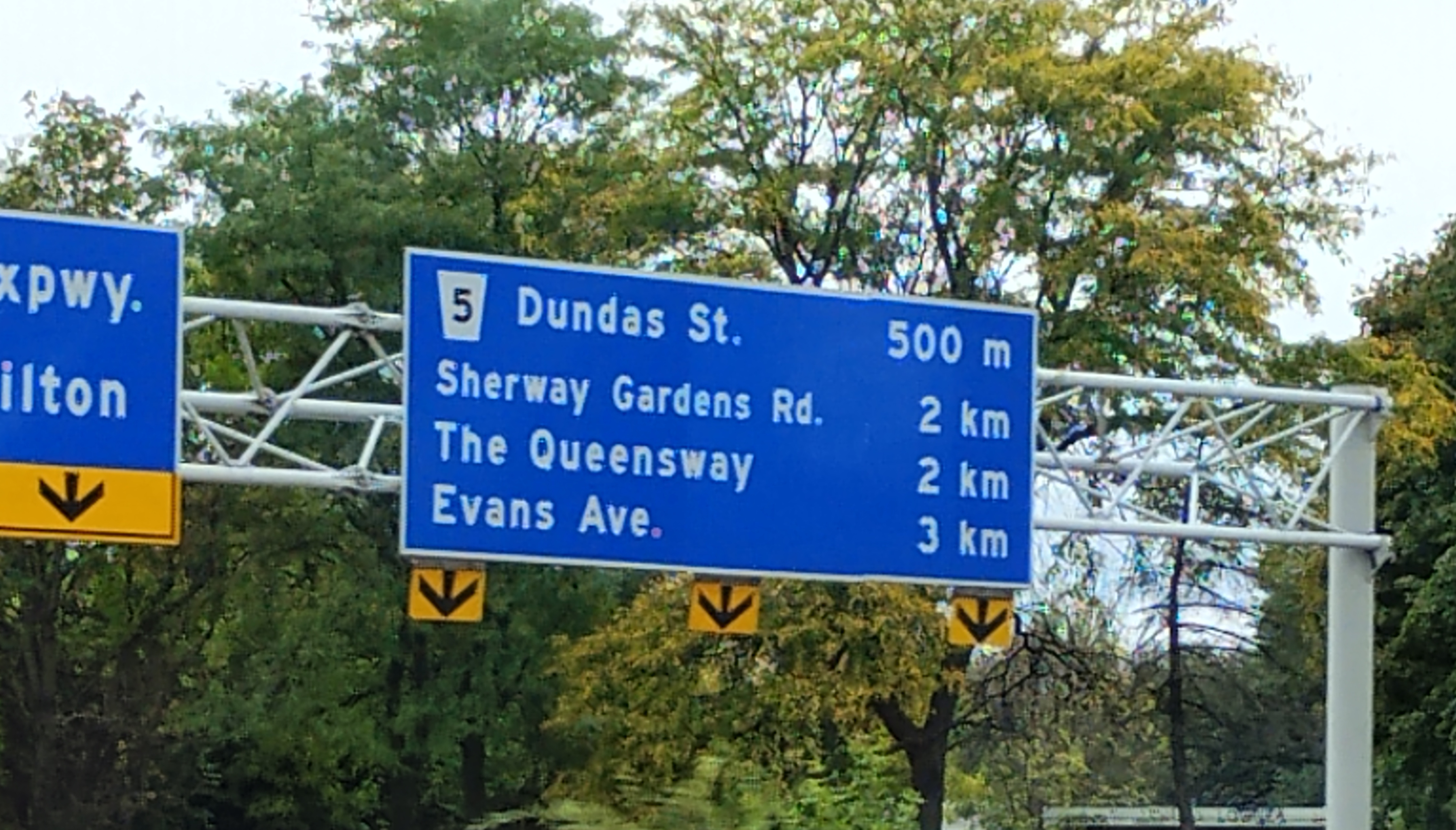
Incorrect signage along Highway 427 in Toronto identifying Dundas Street as being "Regional Road 5"

Following the creation of Metropolitan Toronto on April 15, 1953, the new municipality was given responsibility for most of the provincial highways that passed within its boundaries that were not already connecting links following streets urbanized prior to this time. The sections of Highway 5 through Etobicoke and Scarborough were accordingly redesignated as connecting links and their maintenance given over to the new Metro government on January 15, 1954. A 12.1-kilometre (7.5 mi) portion of Highway 5 from Etobicoke Creek west to Mississauga Road was made a connecting link though the recently established Town of Mississauga on April 1, 1970. Another 2.8 kilometres (1.7 mi), between Winston Churchill Boulevard and Mississauga Road in Mississauga, was designated a connecting link on November 22, 1978. on November 27, 1991, a 1.2 kilometres (0.75 mi) segment of Dundas Street, from the interchange with Highway 403 east to Winston Churchill Boulevard, was made a connecting link through the municipal boundary area between Mississauga and Oakville, and maintenance was transferred to these municipalities. As the connecting links were technically still part of Highway 5, shields continued to be posted along it and marked on the Official Ontario Road Map through Mississauga and Metropolitan Toronto up until 1998 when the highway designation was dropped altogether, although the provincial highway shields were replaced with regional road shields on some overhead signage along Highway 427, despite Toronto not having a numbered road system.

As part of a series of budget cuts initiated by premier Mike Harris under his Common Sense Revolution platform in 1995, numerous highways deemed to no longer be of significance to the provincial network were downloaded to a lower level of government. As it generally served as a local arterial road through the growing suburbs of Oakville and Burlington, Highway 5 was downloaded from Highway 6 at Clappison's Corners to Highway 403, and transferred to the Regional Municipalities of Hamilton–Wentworth and Halton on January 1, 1998. On the same day, the portions of the route west of Peters Corners were transferred to Hamilton–Wentworth and the County of Brant. This removed 53.3 kilometres (33.1 mi) from the length of the highway, leaving only the portion between Peters Corners and Clappison's Corners in the provincial highway network.

Nonetheless the MTO continues to maintain short segments of Dundas Street (former Highway 5) at interchanges with provincial freeways, including a 400-metre (440 yd) portion at Highway 403, as well as a 1.9-kilometre (1.2 mi) portion at Highway 427.

=== Since 1998 ===
In July 2001, a new interchange with Highway 407 ETR was opened, connecting the extension of the toll highway with former Highway 5 in Burlington.

An operational and safety review of the three intersections at Peters Corners near Hamilton was undertaken in February 2001. Studies, including an environmental assessment were conducted between 2004 and 2009, and settled upon a roundabout as the ideal replacement, with traffic signals at the two intersections with Westover Road (former Highway 52). Construction began in the spring of 2012, and the C$6.3 million roundabout was opened on September 25, 2012.

== Major intersections ==
The following table lists the major junctions along Highway 5, as noted by the Ministry of Transportation of Ontario.

Division	Location	km	mi	Destinations	Notes
Brant	Paris	−29.2	−18.1	County Highway 5 begins County Highway 2 (Dundas Street / Paris Road); County Road 55 north (Green Lane)	Formerly Highway 5 western terminus; formerly Highway 2; former Highway 5 follows Brant County Highway 5 and first section of Dundas Street
Brant	Osborne Corners	−22.4	−13.9	Highway 24 south – Brantford County Highway 99 east (Governors Road)	Former western end of Highway 24 concurrency; formerly Highway 99 east; end of first section of Dundas Street
Brant		−18.6	−11.6	Highway 24 north – Cambridge County Road 35 west (Blue Lake Road)	Former eastern end of Highway 24 concurrency
Brant	St. George	−15.6	−9.7	County Road 13 (Main Street)	
Brant–Hamilton boundary		−12.6	−7.8	Brant County Highway 5 ends Hamilton City Road 5 begins	
Hamilton		0.0	0.0	Highway 5 begins City Road 5 breaks Highway 8 west – Cambridge; City Road 52 south – Copetown	Peters Corners; current Highway 5 western terminus; formerly Highway 52 south; western end of Highway 8 concurrency
Hamilton		0.3	0.19	Highway 8 ends City Road 8 south – Dundas	Formerly Highway 8 east; eastern end of Highway 8 concurrency
Hamilton		5.7	3.5	Brock Road	Formerly Regional Road 504
Hamilton		9.8	6.1	Sydenham Road	Formerly Regional Road 505 south
Hamilton		10.0	6.2	Millgrove Side Road	Formerly Regional Road 505 north
Hamilton		12.8	8.0	Highway 6 – Guelph, Toronto, Brantford Highway 5 ends City Road 5 resumes (Dundas Street)	Clappison's Corners; current Highway 5 eastern terminus; beginning of second section of Dundas Street
Hamilton–Halton boundary	Hamilton–Burlington boundary	18.8	11.7	Kerns Road Hamilton City Road 5 ends Halton Regional Road 5 begins	
Halton	Burlington	23.3	14.5	407 ETR	Highway 407 exit 5
Halton	Oakville	30.5	19.0	Regional Road 25 (Bronte Road)	Formerly Highway 25
Halton–Peel boundary	Oakville–Mississauga boundary	41.5	25.8	Highway 403	Highway 403 exit 106
Halton–Peel boundary	Oakville–Mississauga boundary	43.0	26.7	Halton Regional Road 5 ends Peel Regional Road 19 (Winston Churchill Boulevard)	Unsigned concurrency with Halton Regional Road 19
Peel	Mississauga	51.4	31.9	Hurontario Street	Formerly Highway 10
Toronto		58.7	36.5	Highway 427	
Toronto		61.4	38.2	Kipling Avenue / Bloor Street	Former Highway 5 follows Bloor Street while Dundas Street continues northeast
Toronto		73.1	45.4	Avenue Road	Formerly Highway 11A
Toronto		73.7	45.8	Yonge Street	Formerly Highway 11
Toronto		75.4– 76.1	46.9– 47.3	Don Valley Parkway	Don Valley Parkway exit 3; Bloor Street becomes Danforth Avenue
Toronto		75.4– 76.1	46.9– 47.3	Prince Edward Viaduct	
Toronto		84.9	52.8	Kingston Road	Westbound exit and eastbound entrance; formerly Highway 2; former Highway 5 eastern terminus
1.000 mi = 1.609 km; 1.000 km = 0.621 mi: Closed/former; Concurrency terminus; Route transition
