= Ontario Highway 52 =

Former Ontario provincial highway

King's Highway 52
- Hamilton Road 52, Copetown Road, Trinity Road

Route information
- Maintained by City of Hamilton
- Length: 10.5 km (6.5 mi)
- Existed: September 1, 1937–January 1, 1998

Major junctions
- South end: Highway 2 / Highway 53 (Wilson Street)
- Highway 403
- North end: Highway 8 (Dundas Street) – Hamilton

Location
- Country: Canada
- Province: Ontario
- Major cities: Hamilton
- Towns: Ancaster
- Villages: Rockton, Copetown

Highway system
- Ontario provincial highways; Current; Former; 400-series
- Hamilton Municipal Road System
← Highway 49	→ Highway 58
Former provincial highways
← Highway 51	Highway 53 →

King's Highway 52, commonly referred to as Highway 52, was a provincially maintained highway located in the former Regional Municipality of Hamilton-Wentworth, now the City of Hamilton. The route began at a junction with former Highway 2 and Highway 53 near Ancaster and travelled north to Highway 5 and Highway 8 in Peters Corners. An older section travelled concurrently with Highway 8 northwest to Rockton, where it turned north and travelled to the Hamilton–Wellington boundary, ending inexplicably at a township road.

Highway 52 was first established in 1937 and 1938. The route remained unchanged until the formation of Hamilton-Wentworth, after which the portion north of Highway 8 was transferred to the region in 1987. The remainder between Highway 53 and Peters Corners was transferred to the region in 1998.

== Route description ==
Highway 52 passes beneath high-tension lines north of Highway 403

Highway 52 was a rural highway on the outskirts of Hamilton. Although it has been locally maintained for a number of years, the surrounding has remained relatively unaltered since then. The route begins at an intersection with former Highway 2 and Highway 53 west of Ancaster. From there the highway travelled north, interchanging with Highway 403 at Exit 55. The route passes through the communities of Summit and Copetown, intersecting the former Highway 99, the Governors Road, in the latter. Soon thereafter, it intersects the former western leg of Highway 5. Immediately north of this, the route encounters Highway 8 at a second intersection, where it ended during the final decade of its existence.

== History ==
Highway 52 and Highway 97 ran concurrently prior to the formation of the Region of Hamilton-Wentworth in 1970

Highway 52 originally travelled from Highway 8 in Rockton north along at least five different township roads over 13 kilometres (8 mi), ending at a local township road at the Wellington/Wentworth County Line. This section was assumed by the Department of Highways on September 1, 1937. On April 13, 1938, a dirt road from Peter's Corners south to Highway 2 and Highway 53 (Wilson Street) in Ancaster was assumed as Highway 52, creating a 7-kilometre (4 mi) concurrency with Highway 8. Throughout World War II, the new section of Highway 52 remained unimproved; in 1945 it was gravelled. The road was paved between Highway 2 and Highway 97 in 1955, with the remainder being paved three years later.

For most of its existence, Highway 52 ended inexplicably at this intersection with Gore Road, at the Hamilton – Wellington County boundary

The original section of Highway 52 north of Peters Corners was downloaded to the newly created Regional Municipality of Hamilton–Wentworth on April 24, 1986, shortly after the decommissioning of Highway 97 in 1984. The road's length was reduced to 10.7 kilometres (6.6 mi) and the concurrency with Highway 8 removed.

As part of a series of budget cuts initiated by premier Mike Harris under his Common Sense Revolution platform in 1995, numerous highways deemed to no longer be of significance to the provincial network were decommissioned and responsibility for the routes transferred to a lower level of government, a process referred to as downloading. On April 1, 1998, the remainder of Highway 52 was downloaded to the Region of Hamilton-Wentworth, now the City of Hamilton. The road has not been given a new numerical designation, and is simply known as Westover Road and Trinity Road.

== Major intersections ==
The following table lists the major junctions along Highway 52, as noted by the Ministry of Transportation of Ontario. The entire route was located in the Regional Municipality of Hamilton–Wentworth, now the City of Hamilton. This table documents the route as it was in 1989.

Location	km	mi	Destinations	Notes
	0.0	0.0	Highway 2 / Highway 53 (Wilson Street)	
	2.1	1.3	Jerseyville Road – Ancaster	Traffic circle
Copetown	6.1	3.8	Highway 99 (Governors Road)	Formerly Highway 99
Peters Corners	10.3	6.4	Highway 5 – Brantford, Toronto	
Peters Corners	10.5	6.5	Highway 8 – Cambridge, Hamilton	Northern terminus between 1970 and 1998
1.000 mi = 1.609 km; 1.000 km = 0.621 mi
