= List of numbered roads in Hamilton, Ontario =

List of City Roads

This is a list of numbered roads in the City of Hamilton, Ontario, in the former Regional Municipality of Hamilton-Wentworth. After the amalgamation of the city and the region in 2001, most regional roads were de-numbered, leaving only a few arterial roads numbered, all of them (with the exception of HR 65) former provincial highways, numbered for continuity (with the exception of ON 53).

Route	Local Name(s)	Northern/Western Terminus	Southern/Eastern Terminus	Settlements served	Additional Notes
Hamilton City Road 5	Carman Road; Dundas Street East; Mountain Road; Reids Mills Road	Harrisburg Road	Evans Road	Troy, Peters Corners, Clappison's Corners, Waterdown	Formerly Highway 5. Interrupted from Peters Corners to Clappison's Corners by becoming a still-extant section of Highway 5.
Hamilton City Road 8	Highway No. 8 King Street; Cootes Drive; Main Street; Queenston Road	Highway 5	Niagara Region limits	Peters Corners, Christies Corners, Greensville, Dundas, Hamilton, Stoney Creek, Fruitland, Winona	Formerly Highway 8
Hamilton City Road 20	Centennial Parkway; Rymal Road	QEW	Niagara Region limits	Stoney Creek, Elfrida	Formerly Highway 20
Hamilton City Road 52	Copetown Road	Highway 5	Highway 403	Peters Corners, Copetown, Summit	Formerly Highway 52
Hamilton City Road 56	Regional Road 56	Regional Road 20	Haldimand County limits	Elfrida, Binbrook	Formerly Highway 56
Hamilton City Road 65	Trinity Road; Sawmill Road; Carluke Road; White Church Road; Binbrook Road	Highway 403	Westbrook Road	Trinity, Carluke, Binbrook	
Hamilton City Road 97	Old Beverly Road	Waterloo County limits	Highway 6	Valens	Formerly Highway 97
Hamilton City Road 99	Governors Road	Bethel Church Road	Regional Road 8	Lynden, Copetown, Dundas	Formerly Highway 99
