= Ontario Highway 99 =

Former Ontario provincial highway

King's Highway 99
- Governor's Road

Route information
- Maintained by the Ministry of Transportation
- Existed: 1794–April 1, 1997

Major junctions
- West end: Highway 5 / Highway 24 – Osborne Corners
- Highway 52 in Copetown
- East end: Highway 8 in Dundas

Location
- Country: Canada
- Province: Ontario
- Major cities: Brantford, Hamilton
- Towns: Copetown, Ontario, Dundas

Highway system
- Ontario provincial highways; Current; Former; 400-series
← Highway 98	→ Highway 100

King's Highway 99, also known as Highway 99 or The Governor's Road, was a provincially maintained highway in the Canadian province of Ontario that connected Highway 24 north of Brantford with Highway 8 in Dundas, lying approximately midway between Highway 2 to the south and Highway 5. The Governor's Road, an important historical highway that is a part (and an alternate historical name of) Dundas Street, continues west of Highway 24 to Woodstock and onwards to London. Highway 99 was first designated as Highway 5B in 1938, but was renumbered by 1940. The route was paved in 1953, but otherwise remained unchanged until the 1980s, when it was truncated at the Brant County – Hamilton-Wentworth boundary. The remainder of the route was decommissioned in 1997.

== Route description ==
Highway 99 was a generally straight highway that served as an alternative route to Highway 2 and Highway 5. It began at an intersection with Highway 24 and Highway 5 north of Brantford at Osborne Corners. From that intersection, Highway 5 travelled west and Highway 24 south, while both travelled north concurrently. Highway 99 travelled east, crossing the boundary between Brant County and Hamilton (then Wentworth County) 6.1 km (3.8 mi) east of Osborne Corners.

Within Hamilton, the highway crossed a Canadian National Railway on an overpass before bisecting the community of Lynden and Copetown, intersecting Highway 52 in the latter. East of Copetown, the route descended the Niagara Escarpment, finally diverging from its otherwise straight path. It passed through the Dundas Valley Conservation Area before entering the town of Dundas, where it turned north and ended at an intersection with Highway 8 (Cootes Drive).

== History ==
Highway 99 was first constructed in 1793 and 1794 as part of the historic Dundas Street or The Governor's Road (later Governors Road) that ran between Toronto and London. The Highway 99 designation was applied by the Department of Highways in 1938 as an alternative route to the busy (Highway 5) and Transprovincial Highway (Highway 2). On April 13, 1938, the 17.2-mile (27.7 km) Governors Road was assumed into the provincial highway network as Highway 5B. This designation was short-lived, as the route was renumbered Highway 99 by 1940.

When the province took over responsibility for the Governors Road, it was already paved between Copetown and Dundas; the remainder was a gravel road until it was paved in 1953. The route of the highway remained unchanged until the early 1980s. In 1982 or 1983, the section of the route laying within Hamilton-Wentworth was transferred to that region, leaving a 6.6 km (4.1 mi) stub. On April 1, 1997, the remainder of the highway was transferred to Brant County, decommissioning the route number in the process.

== Major intersections ==
The following table lists the major junctions along Highway 99, as noted by the Ministry of Transportation of Ontario. The entire route was located in Brant.

Location	km	mi	Destinations	Notes
Osborne Corners	0.0	0.0	Highway 5 / Highway 24	
Brantford	1.7	1.1	County Road 32 south (Park Road)	
Brantford	3.5	2.2	County Road 13 north (St. George Road) – St. George	
Brant County – Hamilton boundary	6.6	4.1		
1.000 mi = 1.609 km; 1.000 km = 0.621 mi
