= Cootes Drive =

Road in Hamilton, Ontario

- Dundas Diversion, Highway 102
- A map of Cootes Drive, in red

Route information
- Maintained by City of Hamilton
- Length: 3.2 km (2.0 mi)
- Existed: September 11 or 12, 1937–present

Major junctions
- West end: York Street / York Road in Dundas
- East end: Main Street (formerly Highway 2)

Location
- Country: Canada
- Province: Ontario
- Major cities: Hamilton

Highway system
- Roads in Ontario

Cootes Drive, formerly known as the Dundas Diversion, is a city street in Hamilton, Ontario. The route connects York Road and King Street in Dundas with Main Street (formerly Highway 2 and Highway 8) to the southeast, and is considered one of the first divided highways in Canada. Originally constructed as the Dundas Diversion, the route served to bypass several sharp turns along the nearby Highway 8, as well as to demonstrate the new dual highway concept that would soon thereafter evolve into the 400-series highway network. Construction began in 1936, and the route opened on the weekend of September 11, 1937.

Cootes Drive continued to be referred to as the Dundas Diversion by the Department of Highways (DHO), predecessor to the modern Ministry of Transportation of Ontario until 1947, though it occasionally appeared in internal documents as Highway 8D and Highway 6D in the early 1940s. By 1948, the route was publicly designated as Highway 102, which it remained as until 1964 before being transferred to the townships of Ancaster and West Flamborough in 1964. It has since been known as Cootes Drive.

== Route description ==
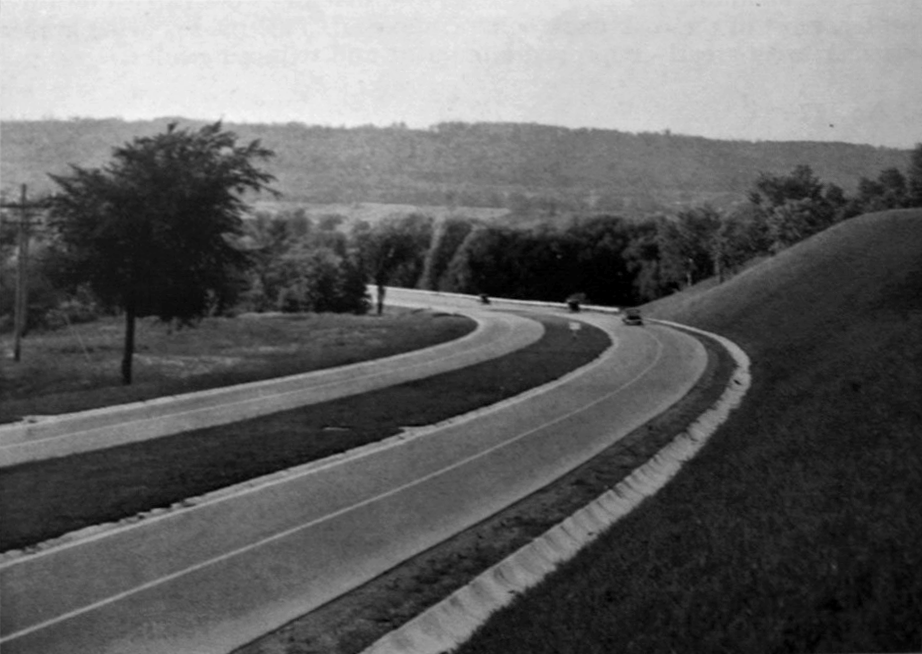
The newly completed Dundas Diversion, 1937

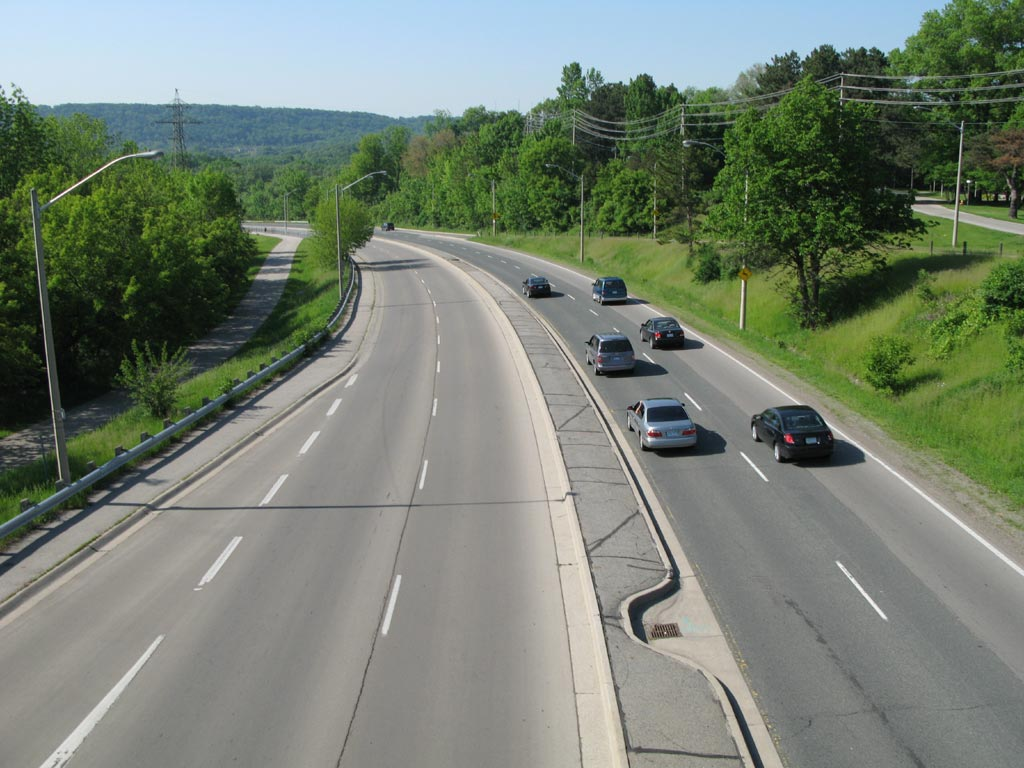
Similar angle, 2007

Cootes Drive connects Dundas with the Hamilton neighbourhoods of Ainslie Wood and Westdale, passing primarily through the swampland at the western head of Lake Ontario known as Cootes Paradise, for which the route is named. Cootes Paradise is named for Thomas Coote (nephew of Eyre Coote). Coote served as a lieutenant in the 8th (The King's) Regiment of Foot from 1776–1781 and later as a captain of the 34th (Cumberland) Regiment of Foot, and spent his free time shooting ducks in the marsh that came to be named for him.

The route begins at the intersection of King Street and York Street / York Road in downtown Dundas, where it forms a thoroughfare with King Street. The route immediately widens from two to four lanes and briefly travels diagonally through the eastern edge of the town, partially along the former alignment of Baldwin Street. After passing the eastern terminus of the western segment of Dundas Street (former Highway 99), it exits Dundas and becomes sandwiched between the Desjardins Canal to the north and Spencer Creek as well as the former Hamilton Street Railway—now the Spencer Creek Trail—to the south. A recreational trail also follows adjacent to the south side of the road east of Dundas Street.

Cootes Drive intersects Olympic Drive and passes under several overhead power lines that connect to the adjacent Dundas Transformer Station; one of these lines turns east and follows along the south side of the road. Now serving as the southwestern boundary of the Royal Botanical Gardens, the route begins a long gentle curve to the south, crossing Spencer Creek midway through the curve. As it approaches the end of the curve, the power lines cross to the east and ramps serve Westaway Road, which passes over the road. The east side of the route is now dominated by McMaster University, while the residential neighbourhood of Ainslie Wood flanks the west side. The recreation trail ends at Sanders Boulevard, which stops short of an intersection with Cootes Drive, but features a traffic signal for pedestrians to cross to the university. After a brief jog eastward, Cootes Drive ends at an intersection with Main Street West. Leland Street continues south of Main Street West as a residential street.

== History ==
The Dundas Diversion was one of the first divided dual-carriageway road built in Canada. As part of a plan to build "dual highways" across southern Ontario, Minister of Highways Thomas McQuesten had instructed his Deputy Minister, Robert Melville Smith, to research the Autobahns of Germany in 1934 and subsequently used this design to develop The Middle Road. McQuesten also began expanding short sections of Highway 2 in Windsor, Woodstock, Scarborough, and along what is now the Thousand Islands Parkway amongst other places. These sections were built in an effort to entice support amongst taxpayers for his larger plans. The Dundas Diversion was another of these short new highways. It was first publicly announced by the Department of Highways (DHO), predecessor to the modern Ministry of Transportation of Ontario, in late June 1936, and construction began on July 21. The majority of the grading was completed by November before construction was halted for the winter. A contract was let for the paving of the graded route in April 1937, and the new road—while not fully completed—was opened to traffic on the weekend of September 11, 1937.

The DHO continued to refer to this route as the Dundas Diversion for several years, before designating it as Highway 8D for the first time in the Annual Report for 1940. It remained as Highway 8D through 1942, before being labelled as Highway 6D the following two years. It returned to being labelled as the Dundas Diversion from 1944 to 1947, making it unclear if the route was ever signed with a number. However, by 1948, the Dundas Diversion was signed as Highway 102. Highway 102 remained in place until 1964, when responsibility and maintenance over the route was transferred to the townships of Ancaster and West Flamborough. The portion east of Spencer Creek was transferred to Ancaster on April 1, while the portion to the west of the creek was transferred to West Flamborough on August 14.

By 1969, the former highway was known as Cootes Drive. The Highway 102 designation was reused on a different highway near Thunder Bay by 1972. In late October 2007, Hamilton City Council voted to assign the commemorative Veterans Memorial Parkway designation to Cootes Drive between East Street / Dundas Street and Main Street West.

== Major intersections ==
The following table lists the major junctions along Cootes Drive, as noted by the City of Hamilton. The entire route is located in Hamilton, Ontario.

km	mi	Destinations	Notes
0.0	0.0	York Road	continues west as King Street
0.5	0.31	Dundas Street / East Street	Former eastern terminus of Highway 99
1.2	0.75	Olympic Drive	
2.5	1.6	Westaway Road	Access to McMaster University
3.2	2.0	City Road 8 (Main Street West)	Continues south as Leland Street; formerly Highway 2 and Highway 8
1.000 mi = 1.609 km; 1.000 km = 0.621 mi

== See also ==
- List of streets in Hamilton, Ontario
