= Ontario Highway 5A =

Former Ontario provincial highway

Ontario Highway 5A (1937–1953), as a former Connecting Link in the Ontario Provincial Highway Network, bypassed portions of Ontario Highway 5 within what is now Toronto. There were two discontinuous segments:

- Dundas Street, Scarlett Road, and St. Clair Avenue from Highway 5 (Islington) eastward to Highway 11 (Yonge Street, Toronto).
- Eglinton Avenue from Victoria Park Avenue (then Dawes Road, Scarborough) eastward to Ontario Highway 2 (Kingston Road); renumbered as Highway 109 in 1953.
