= Dundas Street =

Major arterial road in Ontario, Canada

Dundas Street Governors Road
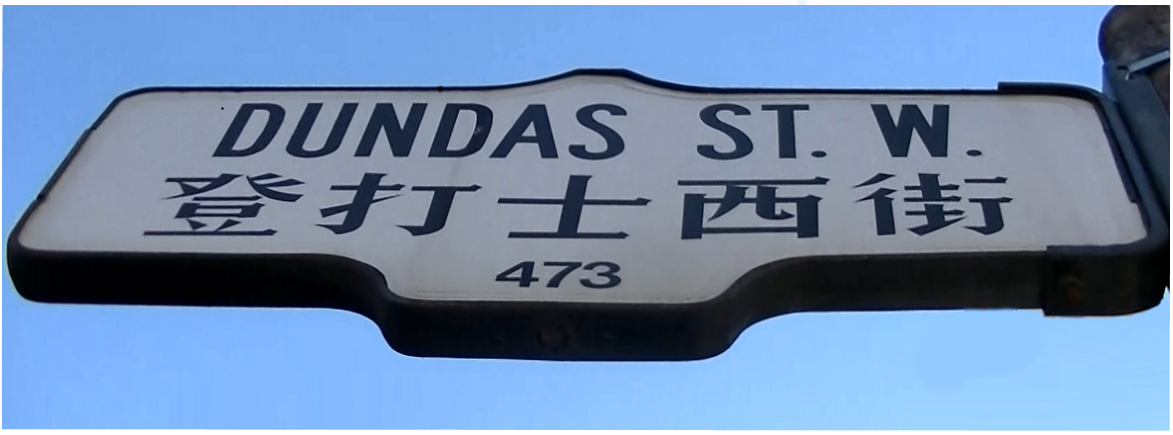
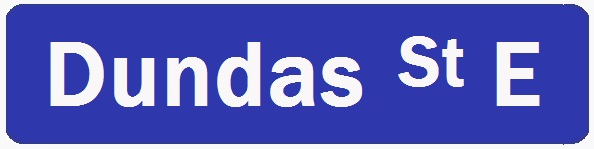
- Halton Regional Road 5 Hamilton Roads 5 / 99; Brant County Road 2 Oxford County Road 2 Middlesex County Road 2
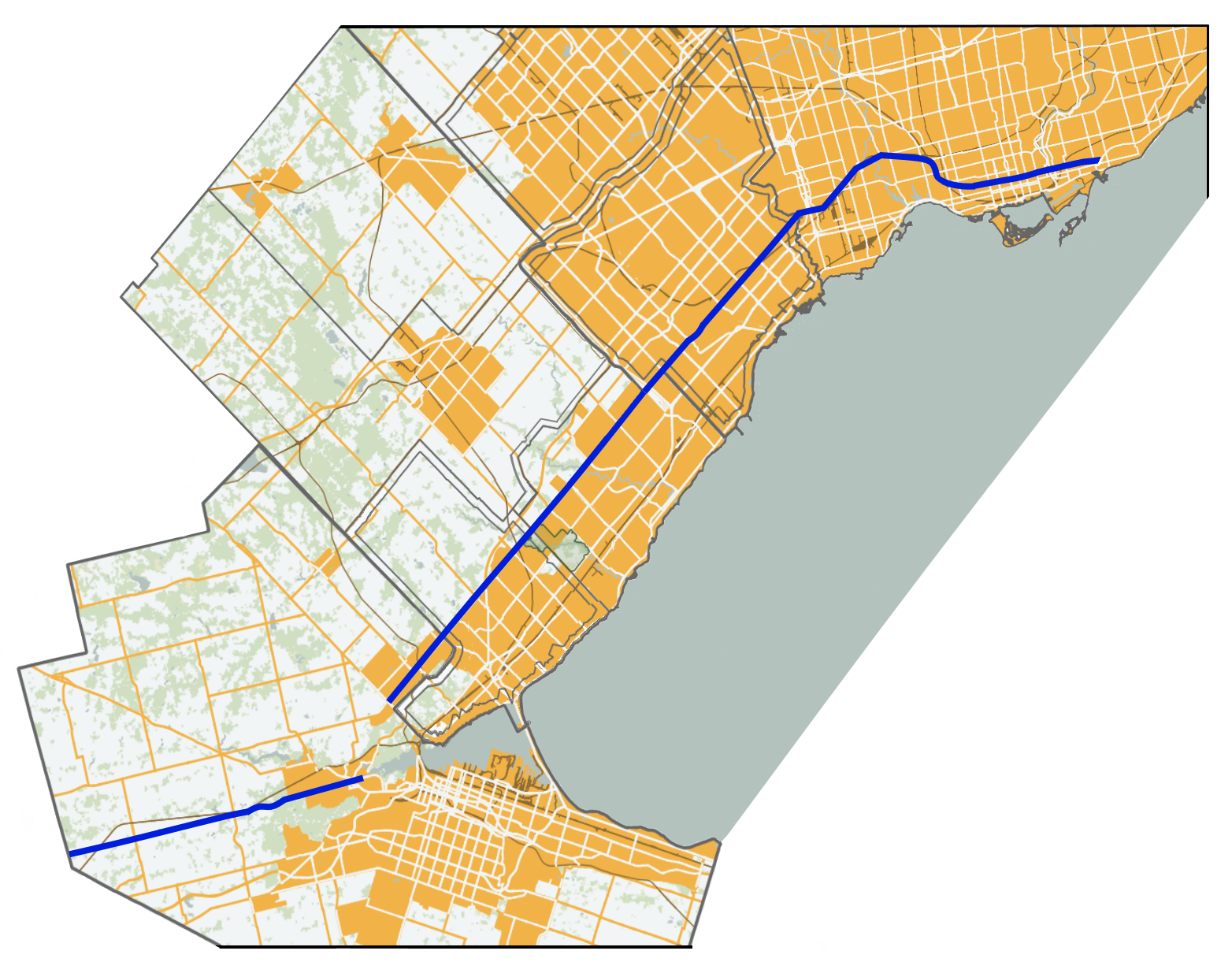
- Route of Dundas Street through the Greater Toronto and Hamilton Area (highlighted in blue)
- Maintained by: City of Toronto; City of Mississauga; Region of Halton; City of Hamilton; County of Brant; County of Oxford; County of Middlesex; City of London
- Location: Toronto; Mississauga; Oakville; Burlington; Hamilton (Waterdown); Paris; Woodstock; London
- West end: Thames River in London (Continues as Riverside Drive)
- Major junctions: Wellington Street; Highbury Avenue; Veterans Memorial Parkway; Oxford Road 119; Oxford Road 59; Highway 401; Highway 24 (King George Road); Cootes Drive; — Gap and shifts north —; Highway 6; Guelph Line; Highway 407 ETR; Bronte Road; Trafalgar Road; Highway 403; Winston Churchill Boulevard; Erin Mills Parkway; Hurontario Street; Cawthra Road; Dixie Road; Highway 427; Kipling Avenue; Bloor Street; Burnhamthorpe Road; Islington Avenue; Jane Street; Keele Street; Dufferin Street; Bathurst Street; Yonge Street; Don Valley Parkway; Broadview Avenue; Coxwell Avenue
- East end: Kingston Road in Toronto

Construction
- Inauguration: 1793

Other
Nearby arterial roads
← Highway 403; QEW; Bloor Street; Queen Street	Highway 407; Burnhamthorpe Road; College Street; Gerrard Street →

Dundas Street (/ˈdʌnˌdæs/) is a major historic arterial road in Ontario, Canada. The road connects the city of Toronto with its western suburbs and several cities in southwestern Ontario. Four provincial highways—2, 5, 6 and 99—followed long sections of its course, although these highway segments have since been downloaded to the municipalities they passed through. Originally intended as a military route to connect the shipping port of York (now Toronto) to the envisioned future capital of London, Ontario, the street today connects Toronto landmarks such as Sankofa Square and the city's principal Chinatown to rural villages and the regional centres of Hamilton and London.

A historic alternate name for the street was Governor's Road, as its construction was supervised by John Graves Simcoe, lieutenant governor of Upper Canada; and the section between Hamilton and Paris still bears that name, albeit without an apostrophe.

Dundas Street is also one of the few east–west routes to run uninterrupted through the central and western Greater Toronto Area, from Toronto to Hamilton (the others are Lake Shore Boulevard / Lakeshore Road, Eglinton Avenue, Steeles Avenue, Queen Street (Brampton) / Highway 7, and Bovaird Drive / Castlemore Road / Rutherford Road / Carrville Road / 16th Avenue). Within Toronto, the TTC's 505 Dundas streetcar route serves the street from Riverdale to the Junction.

Following controversy over the namesake of the street, Henry Dundas, 1st Viscount Melville, in delaying the abolition of the Atlantic slave trade, a petition with 14,000 signatures was submitted requesting Dundas Street be renamed. Toronto City Council voted in 2021 to rename the section of the street within Toronto – with other municipalities reviewing their use of the name. In 2023, the work to rename the road was paused by Toronto City Council.

== Route description ==
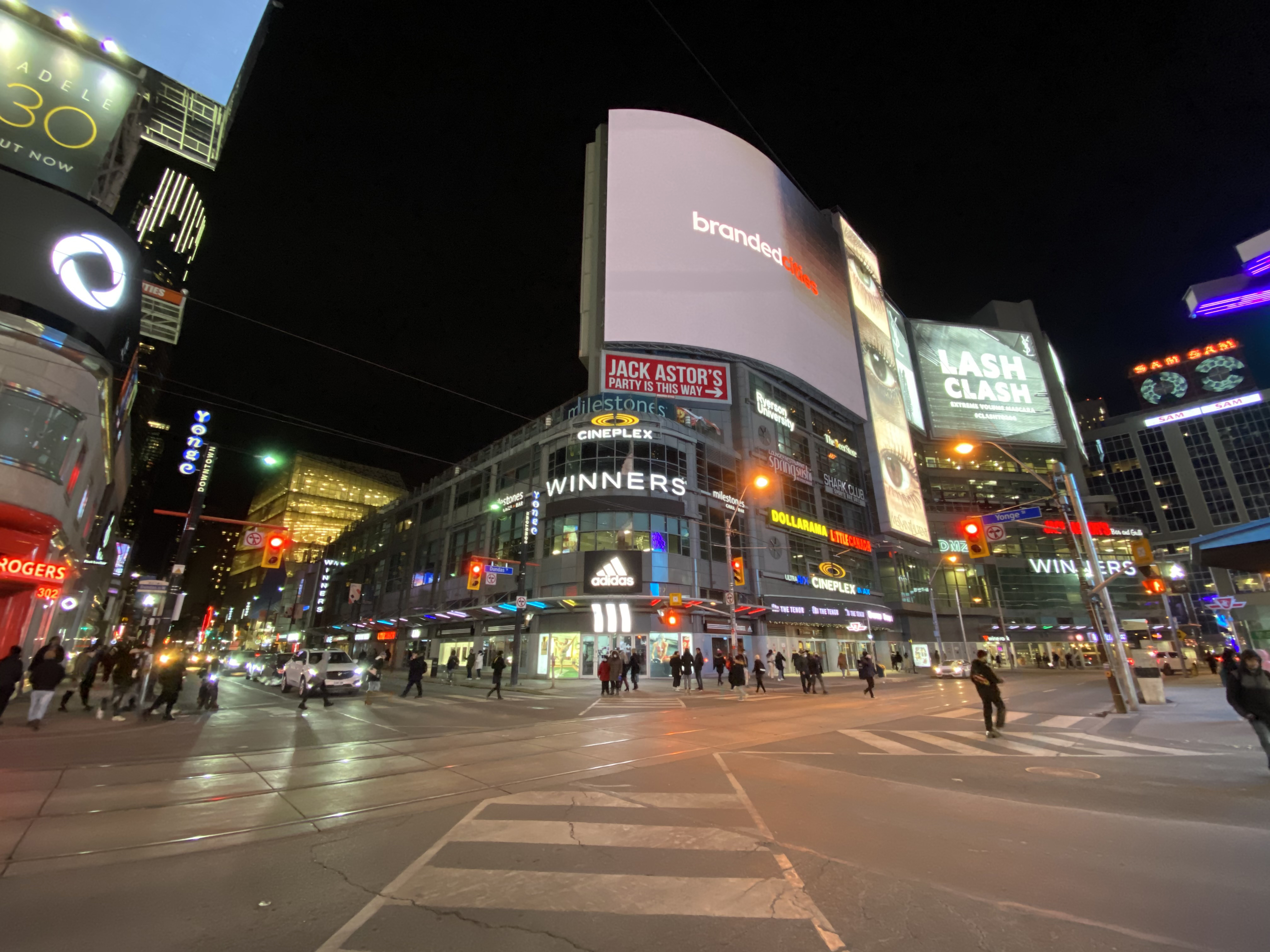
Looking north at the corner of Yonge and Dundas, near Sankofa Square

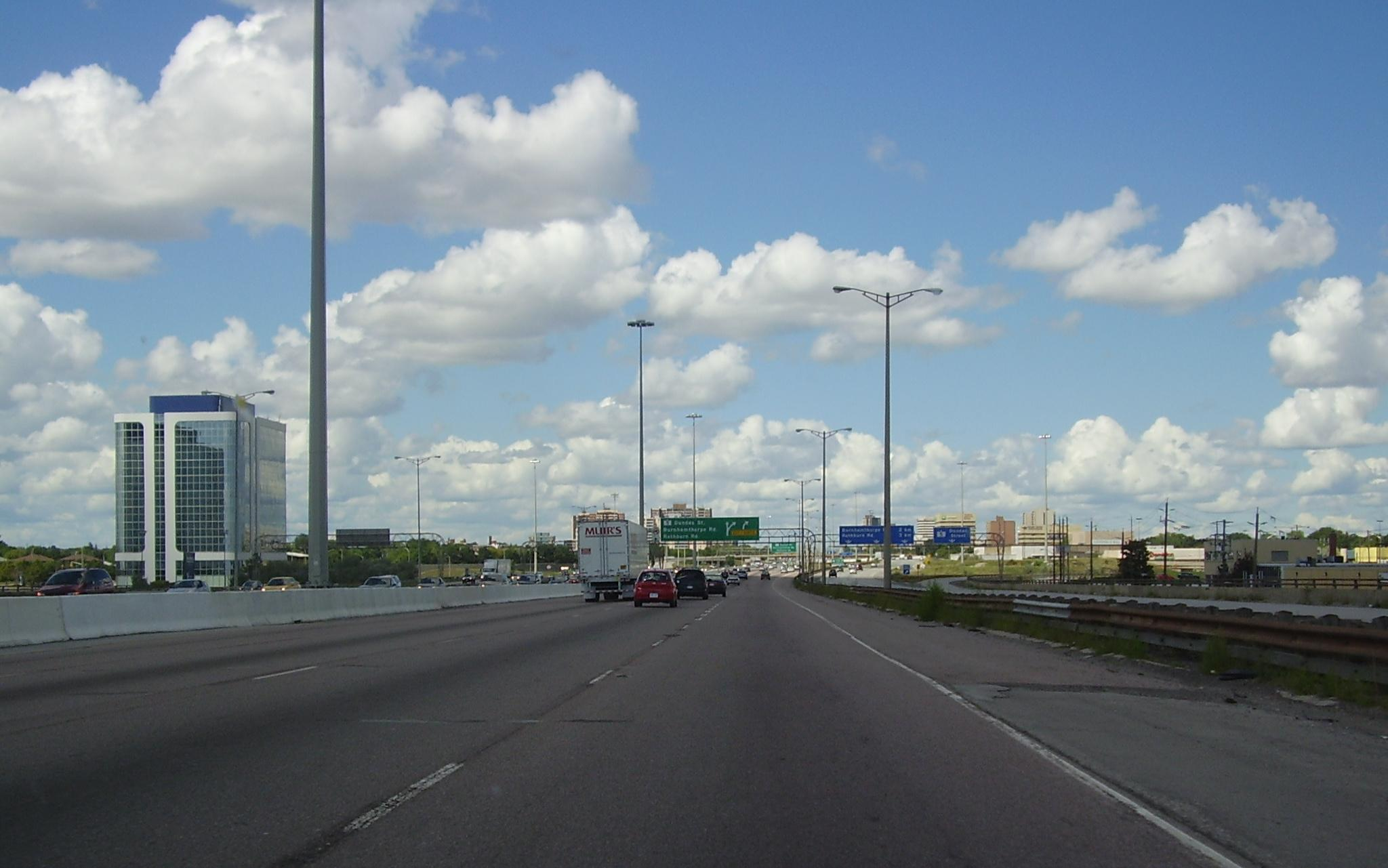
Highway 427 northbound approaching interchange with Dundas Street, with Cloverdale Mall in the right of the background

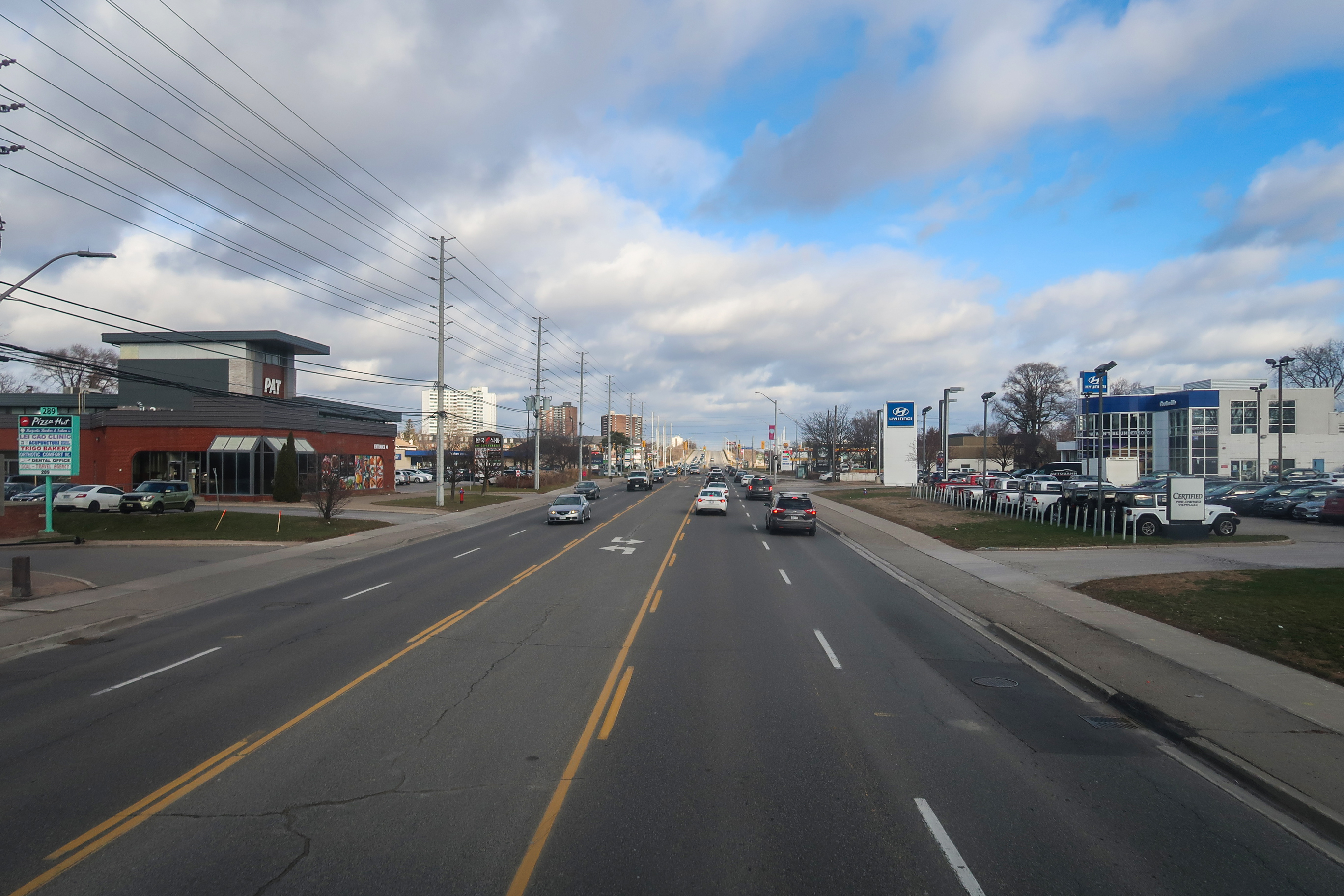
Dundas Street in Mississauga

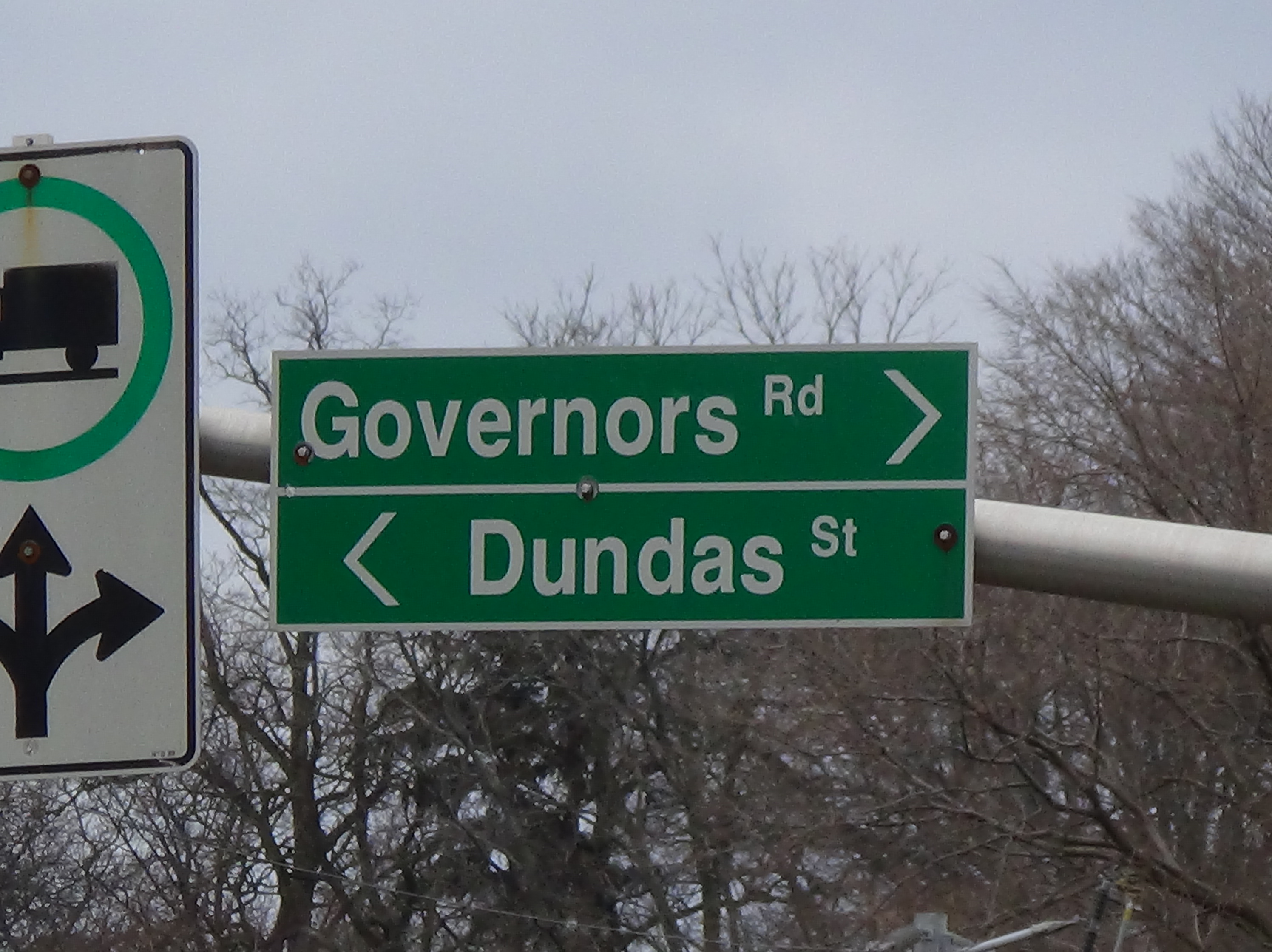
Dundas Street reverts to its historic alternate name in the street's namesake community, Dundas

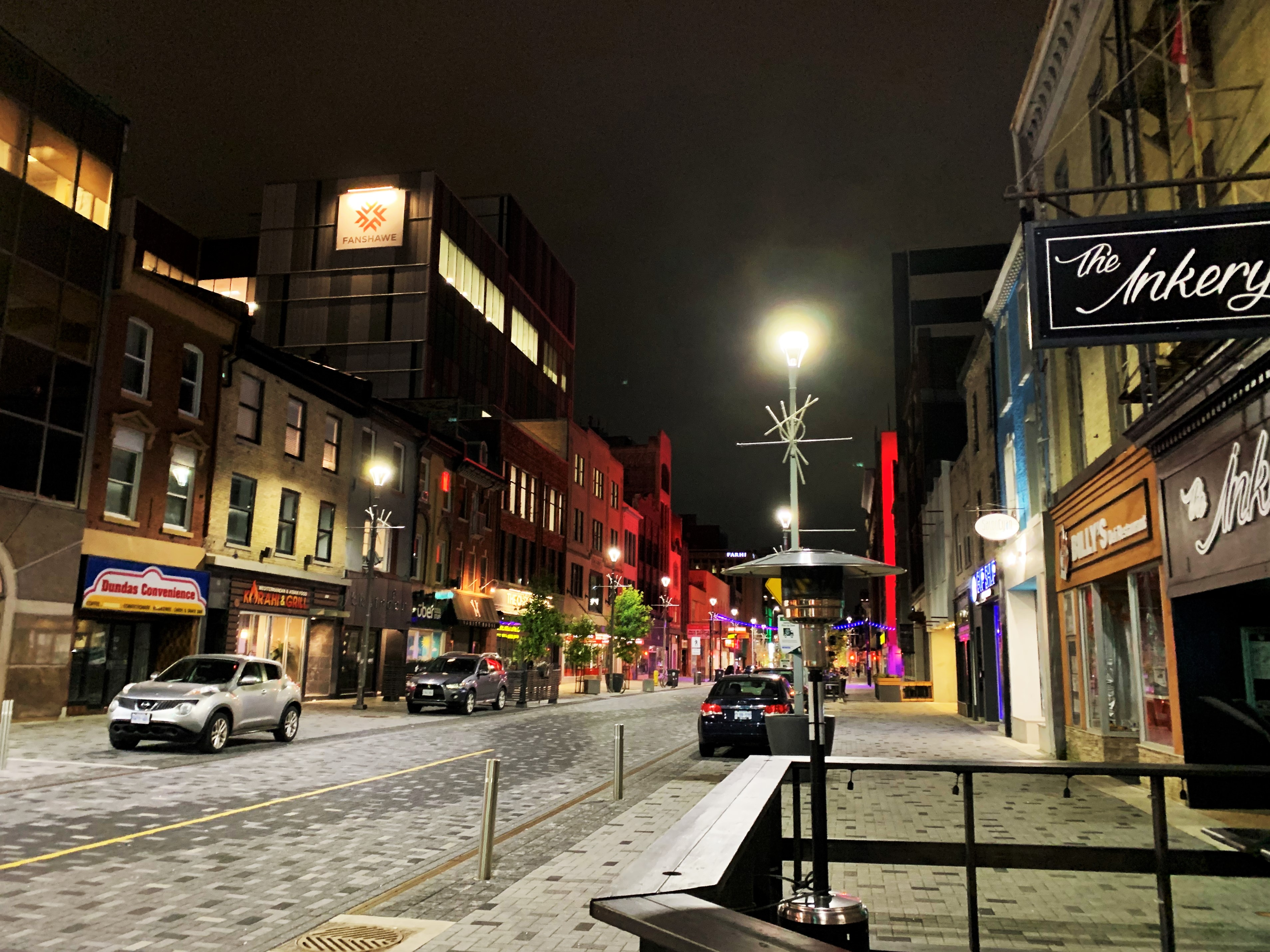
Dundas Street in downtown London

The route of Dundas Street through the city of Toronto is irregular. The street, as laid out today, is made up of what were originally several smaller named streets. Proceeding west through central Toronto, Dundas Street East originates near the Beaches neighbourhood at Kingston Road, itself a historic route to eastern Lake Ontario and the town of Kingston. Originally, the street began at today's Queen and Ossington intersection, and incorporated today's Ossington Street north to the current Dundas intersection, then proceeded west along the route still used today.

Crossing the lower reaches of the Don River west of Broadview Avenue, Dundas serves as one of the few arterial roads connecting the central city to the city's original eastern suburbs. At Yonge Street, Dundas passes Sankofa Square, within sight of downtown landmarks such as the Eaton Centre and Toronto Metropolitan University. Designated Dundas Street West from this point westward, the route passes to the north of Toronto City Hall and Nathan Phillips Square. At McCaul Street, the road fronts the Art Gallery of Ontario in proximity to some of the city's institutions of higher learning, including OCAD University, Michener Institute, and the University of Toronto. At Spadina Avenue, Dundas serves as the east–west axis of the city's largest Chinatown, with the Chinatown sections of Dundas (from Beverly Street in the east to Kensington Avenue in the west) having street signs in Chinese as 登打士街, which is the same as Dundas Street in the Kowloon Peninsula of Hong Kong.

West of Ossington Avenue, it meanders northwards towards Bloor Street near the intersection of Roncesvalles Avenue, heading north toward the Junction district at Keele Street. Proceeding due west from Keele through the Junction, Dundas parallels the CP Rail line through the mixed industrial-residential district. At Scarlett Road, the route veers southwest toward a high crossing over the Humber River valley, through the former village of Lambton Mills. Beyond the river, Dundas serves as the northern boundary of the Kingsway residential district. Passing the historic St. George's Church-on-the-Hill, Dundas again heads southwest toward the former village of Islington. This route traverses the west end of the city, avoiding obstacles that were expensive to negotiate in the 18th century, such as Grenadier Pond in what is now High Park and the highest point of the Humber Valley (Bloor Street to the south requires a high bridge to cross the river at that point).

Dundas intersects for a second time with Bloor Street at Kipling Avenue in Etobicoke. In 1961, the intersection was rebuilt into a highway-type interchange, with an overpass over Kipling. The City of Toronto demolished the interchange and replaced it with a new at-grade intersection. A new routing of Dundas Street to the south of the former interchange was opened in February 2019, connecting via Dunbloor Road (which was rechristened to be a part of Dundas for continuity) to the section east of Kipling. From Kipling, Dundas is a six-lane arterial road, and began to follow the former Highway 5 (which ran along the more direct Bloor east of that point). West of Cloverdale Mall, Dundas Street meets Highway 427 at a parclo interchange.

Upon crossing the Toronto boundary at Etobicoke Creek, the street enters Mississauga, in the Peel Region and follows a southwestern heading. It then enters Halton Region and passes through Oakville and Burlington, and then Waterdown (a part of Hamilton). It leaves the former Highway 5 alignment (which continues west as a still-provincially maintained highway through rural Brant County) west of Highway 6 in Waterdown, and resumes to the south in its namesake former town Dundas (today also part of Hamilton) and follows the former Highway 99 (now Hamilton Road 99) and assumes its alternate name, Governors Road, after crossing Main Street (the original Highway 8). It follows the entire length of former Hwy. 99 west to Osborne Corners where it follows former Highway 5 again to Paris, where it joined former Highway 2 and picks up the name Dundas again. Through most of Paris, Highway 2 bypasses it as it becomes a broken residential street, but rejoins it to follow King Edward Street. The name again resumes west of Paris as the street proceeds west along the former highway through Woodstock en route to London.

In London, the street ends just east of the confluence of the Thames River before it crosses the Kensington Bridge to west London. Originally, this section was called "Dundas Street West" with the eastern portion being "Dundas Street East". However, since construction in the mid-1980s, the entire western portion has been called "Riverside Drive". Some Londoners still refer to the non-renamed portion "Dundas Street East" though it no longer bears an "East" designation. Riverside Drive ends further west at junction with Boler Road and Sanatorium Road.

=== Dundas Street Bridge ===
A 121-metre (396 ft) three-hinged ribbed steel arch bridge was built from 1910 to 1911 to span the Don River valley and railway tracks (now used by the Don Valley Parkway) below. The bridge was a set of four Warren pony truss spans connected by a shorter riveted Warren deck truss spans to the east and west. The bridge has been altered with the removal of ornamental railings with concrete barrier topped with ornamental railing, removal of steel girders with larger abutments to allow for wider road deck was completed in 2007.

== Neighbourhoods ==
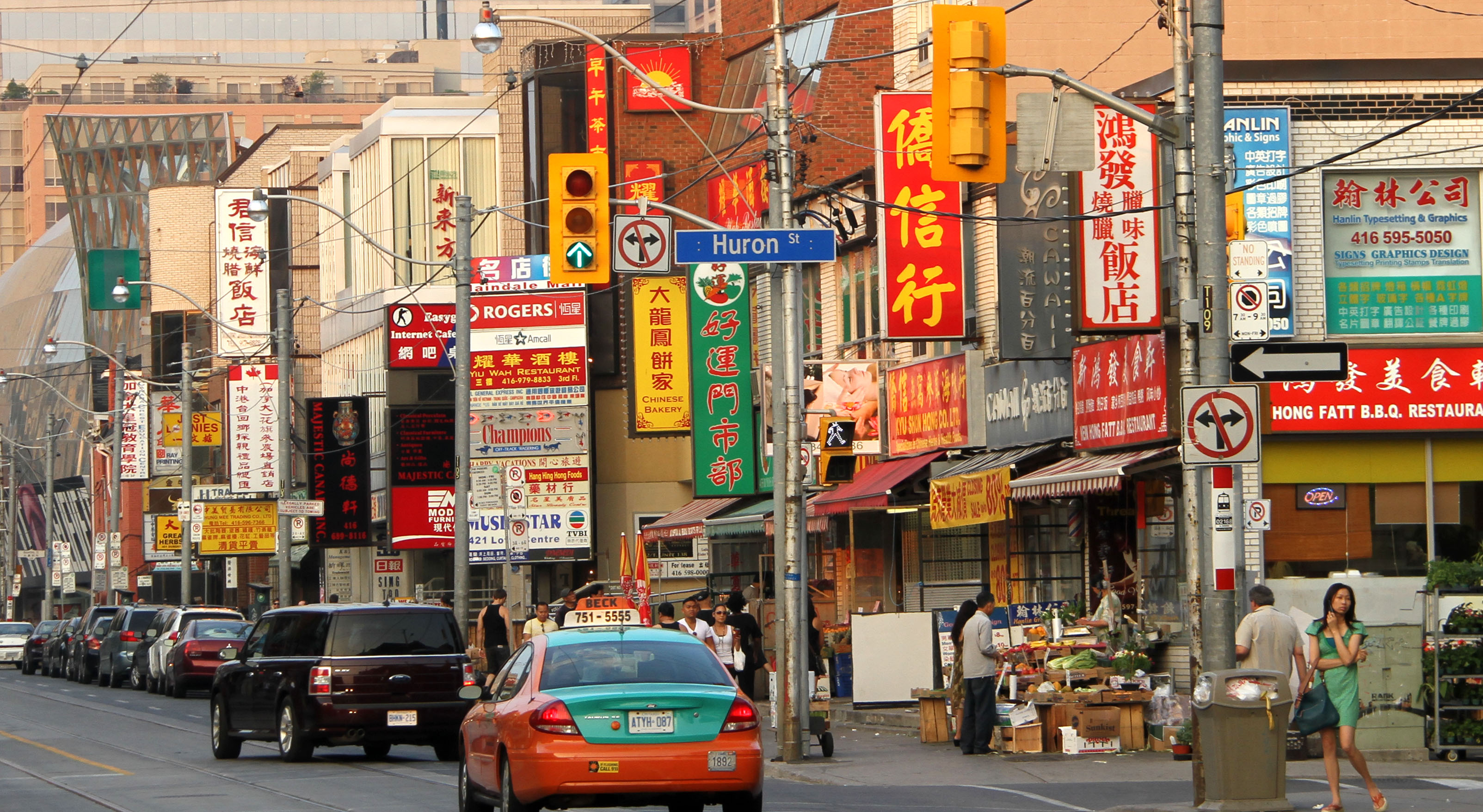
Dundas Street traveling through Chinatown in Toronto

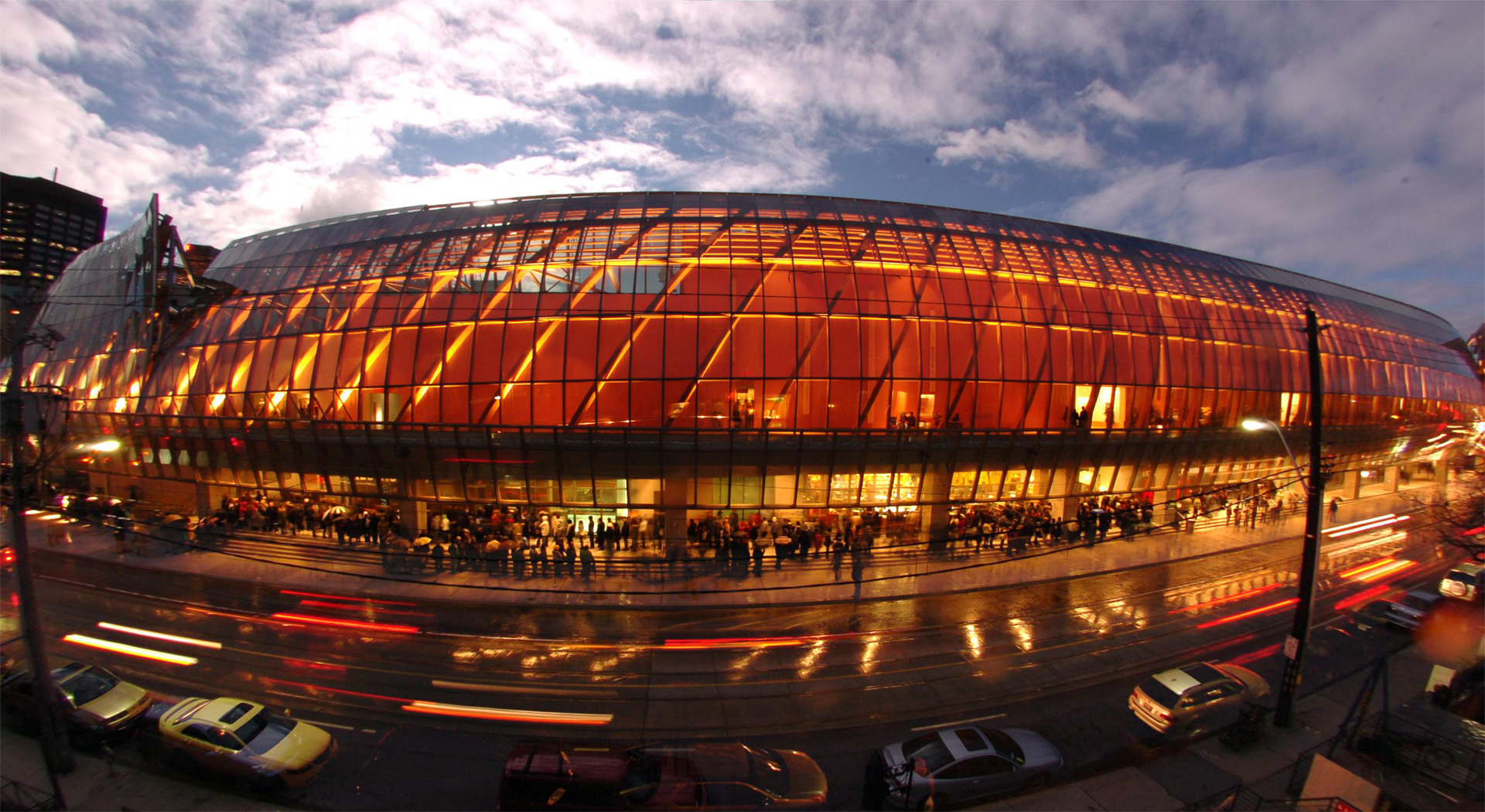
The newly constructed façade of the AGO along Dundas Street West in 2008

Immigrant communities have sprung up along the route of Dundas Street within Toronto, with most still retaining elements of their original character. Kensington Market was home to Toronto's first Jewish community; Spadina's Chinatown is still the city's largest downtown Asian ethnic enclave; Brockton Village became a west-end destination for the immigrant Irish community in the mid-19th century. This district was later settled by emigrants from Portugal and Brazil and bears the name "Rua Açores". The Junction attracted many immigrant labourers from Ireland, Britain, and Southern and Eastern Europe due to its proximity to railways and heavy industry, such as meatpacking, which sprouted up there in the late 19th century.

=== Downtown centre ===
Dundas Street is centrally located in downtown Toronto, about midway between Front Street and Bloor Street. It serves as a major east–west thoroughfare for vehicular, transit, bicycle, and pedestrian traffic downtown and beyond. Since the building of the Eaton Centre and the Sankofa Square, the intersection of Yonge and Dundas Streets has become one of the busiest intersections in the city. It is estimated that over 56 million people pass this intersection each year. To ease traffic, a pedestrian scramble has been installed.

Northeast of Yonge and Dundas is the Toronto Metropolitan University campus. To the east of downtown, Dundas travels through the older Cabbagetown neighbourhood, and the large Regent Park public housing project fills the block south of Dundas between Parliament Street and River Street.

The Dundas and Bay Street area, west to University Avenue, has been developing into a Little Tokyo district. It was previously the location of Toronto's original Chinatown.

=== Art Gallery district ===
Dundas Street is the address of the Art Gallery of Ontario, which takes a full city block on the south side of the street, at the corner of McCaul Street, just west of University Avenue. The north side of the street between McCaul and Beverley is also home to several private art galleries. Just to the south of Dundas on McCaul is OCAD University.

== History ==
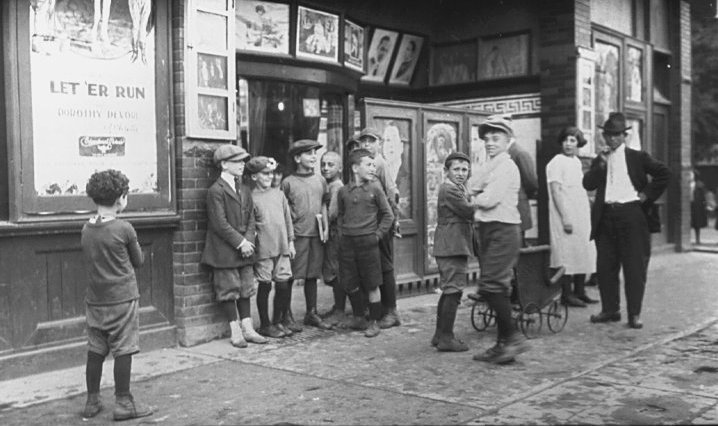
Children in front of a movie theatre on Dundas Street, 1920s

Dundas Street was developed in different time periods and in different sections. The section of the street near Dundas Valley, today known as Governors Road and earlier as Governor's Road, was surveyed by Augustus Jones and constructed by the Queen's Rangers from 1793 to 1794 as a military supply route at the direction of John Graves Simcoe, first lieutenant-governor of Upper Canada. It connected Coote's Paradise, which was later renamed Dundas in reference to the road, which in turn was named after Simcoe's friend Henry Dundas, 1st Viscount Melville, to London, the planned capital at the time, and around Lake Ontario to Newark, today Niagara-on-the-Lake.

In 1796, Dundas Street was extended from just west of what is today Highway 6 east towards York. The road was constructed away from the lake shore, and the American border, so a communication link could be maintained in the event of an invasion. This new section of the street to York was detached from the section from London to Dundas. Instead, the two sections were connected by York Road, which traversed the section of the Niagara Escarpment between them along the path of modern-day York Road, Valley Road, and Patterson Road. Beyond York, Dundas Street was extended further eastwards as a part of what later became Highway 2.

In York the road followed the path of today's Bloor Street within Etobicoke, crossing into York Township near the Old Mill. From the Old Mill, the street travelled north to Davenport Road, until it met Yonge Street. During the War of 1812, the route through Toronto moved south and a bridge was built by 1815 to cross the Humber near Lambton, followed by a series of other bridges over the years. Dundas was re-routed in 1928, which resulted in what is now Old Dundas Street on either side of the Humber. The western section of Old Dundas Street becomes Home Smith Park Road. The current bridge over the Humber opened in 1957 (repaired in 1973 and 2009) to replace the 1907 iron trestle that lost approaches on both ends during Hurricane Hazel in 1954 and resulted in the old bridge being demolished in 1955. An 1800 map shows Dundas connecting with the newly built Yonge Street, although the map does not show the route of this section within Toronto with any detail. An 1816 map of York shows a "Burlington Road", which was a westward extension of today's Queen Street.

Dundas was not formally surveyed through York Township, so the name was not consistently used to describe roads. Before 1812, a portion of Davenport Road was sometimes called Dundas Street, but also the "road to Niagara." The first section of the current route of Dundas Street constructed in Toronto was constructed during the War of 1812. The portion constructed in 1812, connected today's intersection of Queen Street and Ossington Avenue to Lambton Mills. It was constructed by the militia under the supervision of George Taylor Denison. The section of today's Ossington Avenue from Queen Street north to the intersection of Dundas Street was also known as Dundas. At the time, the district along Dundas was not cleared. Montgomery's Inn was built on Dundas Street in 1830 for travellers along this route and also became a center of neighbourhood business in the village of Islington. It stands today, operated as a museum by the City of Toronto.

From Ossington Avenue to the east, Dundas was pieced together from various streets. In the latter half of the 19th century, Arthur Street was connected from Ossington Avenue and Dundas Street to Bathurst Street along the current alignment of Dundas. St. Patrick Street, the portion of today's Dundas from Bathurst Street to (east of McCaul Street it was called Anderson Street) College Avenue (now University Avenue) bisected the Grange estate in 1877. The section from College Avenue (now University Avenue) to Yonge Street was known as Agnes Street. East of Yonge, it was Crookshank Street, Wilton Street, with a portion called Wilton Crescent (George Street to Sherbourne Avenue), and finally Beech Street to River Street. Beyond River, Dundas was severed until a steel Arch bridge was built over the Don River in 1910–1911. From 1922 to 1923, the jog from Agnes Street to Wilton was eliminated, tearing down several buildings at the intersection with Victoria Street and chopping a section off of 171 Victoria Street (the former home of Egerton Ryerson) and renumbering it as 38–40 Dundas Street East. East of the Don, various streets were connected by jogs in the 20th century to form the current road. From the 1920s until the 1940s, Dundas Street terminated at Broadview Avenue in the east. In the 1950s, the city of Toronto implemented a project to extend Dundas eastwards from Broadview to Kingston Road as a new four-lane traffic arterial in order to provide an alternative east–west route to Gerrard and Queen. From west to east, Crawford Street, Elliot Street, Whitby Street, Dickens, Dagmar, Doel, Applegrove and Ashbridge Avenues as well as Maughan Crescent and Hemlock Avenue were all cleared and widened. In some cases, alleyways were used to connect these nine separate streets.

== Public transit ==
In Toronto, Dundas Street is served by the Toronto Transit Commission (TTC) 505 Dundas between Broadview Avenue and its eastern intersection with Bloor Street at Dundas West station. Between Dundas West station and just after its second intersection with Bloor Street at Kipling station it is served by the TTC bus route 40 Junction-Dundas West bus. Beyond Kipling station, it is served by various TTC bus routes.

Through Mississauga, it is served by the MiWay bus routes 1 and 101 starting from the Kipling Bus Terminal next to Kipling station. In Oakville, the Oakville Transit bus route 5 runs on Dundas street between the border with Mississauga and Highway 407. In Burlington, Dundas Street has no dedicated transit route and only has transit service until Guelph Line with the Burlington Transit bus routes 2, 3, 6, and 11 and Oakville Transit bus route 5 all providing service along different sections of the street. In Hamilton, Dundas Street is served by the Hamilton Street Railway bus route 18 through Waterdown.

=== Bus rapid transit ===
The Dundas Street bus rapid transit (Dundas BRT) is a proposed bus rapid transit (BRT) corridor proposed by Metrolinx that would run along Dundas Street from the Kipling Bus Terminal, which connects to Line 2 Bloor–Danforth in Etobicoke, Toronto to Highway 6 in Waterdown, Hamilton. The project is part of the regional transportation plan The Big Move.

In London, the under construction East London Link BRT line, being built by the City Of London will use Dundas Street for part of its route from Ontario Street to Highbury Avenue. The Dundas Street segment is set to open in the summer of 2025. This project is being built as part of the London Rapid Transit plan.

== Name controversy ==
Amid the protests following the murder of George Floyd in 2020, over 10,000 people signed a petition calling for the city to rename Dundas Street, due to Henry Dundas's "involvement in supporting the gradual abolition of the slave trade in the British Empire in the 18th century" as opposed to immediate abolition. On June 10, 2020, Mayor John Tory stated that a working group would be formed "to examine the issue of renaming streets in a broader sense".

The city's final report, published in June 2021, supported renaming the street, concluding that Dundas "played an instrumental role in delaying the abolition of the slave trade" and that this conflicts with "the values of equity and inclusion" of the city. The city's process also sparked reviews of the use of the Dundas name in other areas of the province, including Mississauga, London and Hamilton.

On July 6, 2021, the City of Toronto's executive committee unanimously supported the renaming of Dundas Street. During public deputations, former Governor General Adrienne Clarkson stated that "the name of Dundas has no relevance to Canada ... he has no connection to Toronto". On July 14, Toronto City Council voted 17–7 to rename the street, with a new name to be chosen by April 2022. On December 14, 2023, Toronto city council decided to rename a few city landmarks containing the name Dundas, but not Dundas Street due to cost.
