= Wentworth County, Ontario =

Historic county in Ontario, Canada

Coordinates: 43°15′N 80°00′W

Wentworth County, area 269,057 acres (1,089 km^{2}), is a historic county in the Canadian province of Ontario.

It was created in 1816 as part of the Gore District (1816–1849) in what was then Upper Canada and later Canada West (1841–1867). It was named in honour of Sir John Wentworth, the last royal governor of colonial New Hampshire, lieutenant-governor of Nova Scotia (1792 to 1808) and an intimate friend of William Jarvis, the first provincial secretary of Upper Canada. The county originally consisted of seven townships that formerly belonged to Haldimand, Lincoln and York Counties.

Between 1850 and 1854, Wentworth County and Halton County were briefly joined for government purposes as the United Counties of Wentworth and Halton although for administrative purposes, they remained distinct.

In 1973, Wentworth County was replaced by the Regional Municipality of Hamilton–Wentworth. In 2001, the Regional Municipality and its six constituent municipalities were amalgamated as the "megacity" of Hamilton.

== Constituent townships ==
Each township that was ever part of the county is listed alphabetically below along with its years of existence, and its previous and subsequent configurations.

- Ancaster, area 44,946 acres (182 km^{2}), (surveyed 1798), 1816–1973, later became a village then town and part of township to Town of Dundas
- Barton, area 9,958 acres (40 km^{2}). The township was surveyed 1792 and named after the English town. The township included Hamilton and existed from 1816 to 1973, later became Village and City of Hamilton
- Beverley, area 69,920 acres (283 km^{2}). Surveyed and opened for settlement in 1798. The five northern concessions were surveyed in 1794 and the southern part in 1797. The Township was named from the town in the East Riding of Yorkshire. Community centres were: Copetown, Lynden, Rockton and Westover. The Township existed from 1851 to 1973, later divided with one part to North Dumfries, Ontario and majority to Town of Flamborough
- Binbrook (surveyed 1798), existed from 1816 to 1973, later one half of Glanbrook Township
- Caistor, existed from 1845 to 1851, earlier and later part of Haldimand County, then Lincoln County and, since 1970, the Township of West Lincoln in the Regional Municipality of Niagara
- Flamborough East, area 33,815 acres (137 km^{2}). Both East and West Flamborough were surveyed and opened for settlement in 1792. The Township existed from 1851 to 1973, later divided with one part to City of Burlington and majority to Town of Flamborough
- Flamborough West, area 31,028 acres (126 km^{2}) Both East and West Flamborough were surveyed and opened for settlement in 1792. The Township existed from 1851 to 1973, later divided with one part to Town of Dundas and majority to Town of Flamborough
- Glanford, area 23,527 acres (95 km^{2}) Was surveyed and opened for settlement in 1798. The township was named from Glanford-Brigg in Lincolnshire. Community centres were Glanford and Fenton. The Township existed from 1816 to 1974. The Township was later the other half of Glanbrook Township
- Onondaga, existed from 1816 to 1851, home of the Six Nations of the Grand River
- Saltfleet, area 28,321 acres (115 km^{2}). Was surveyed and opened in 1792. The name was suggested by the existence of several salt water springs. The Township existed from 1816 to 1973, later the town and city of Stoney Creek
- Seneca, existed from 1816 to 1851, later part of Brant County

Source: Province of Ontario -- A History 1615 to 1927 by Jesse Edgar Middleton & Fred Landon, copyright 1927, Dominion Publishing Company, Toronto]

== See also ==
- List of townships in Ontario
