= Clappison's Corners, Ontario =

Community in Hamilton, Ontario, Canada

Coordinates: 43.313°N 79.917°W

Location of Clappison's Corners in Ontario

Clappison's Corners is a community located in the city of Hamilton, Ontario, Canada.

In East and West Flamborough Ts., Reg. Mun. of Hamilton- Wentworth and Hwys 5 & 6, 7 km. NW of Hamilton.

The community, also known as Clappisons Corners, Clappisons and Clappison was named after a family that settled at the junction of the two roadways. 17 Main N, Waterdown, Ontario
