= Flamborough, Ontario =

Community in Hamilton, Ontario

Flamborough
- Community (Dissolved town)
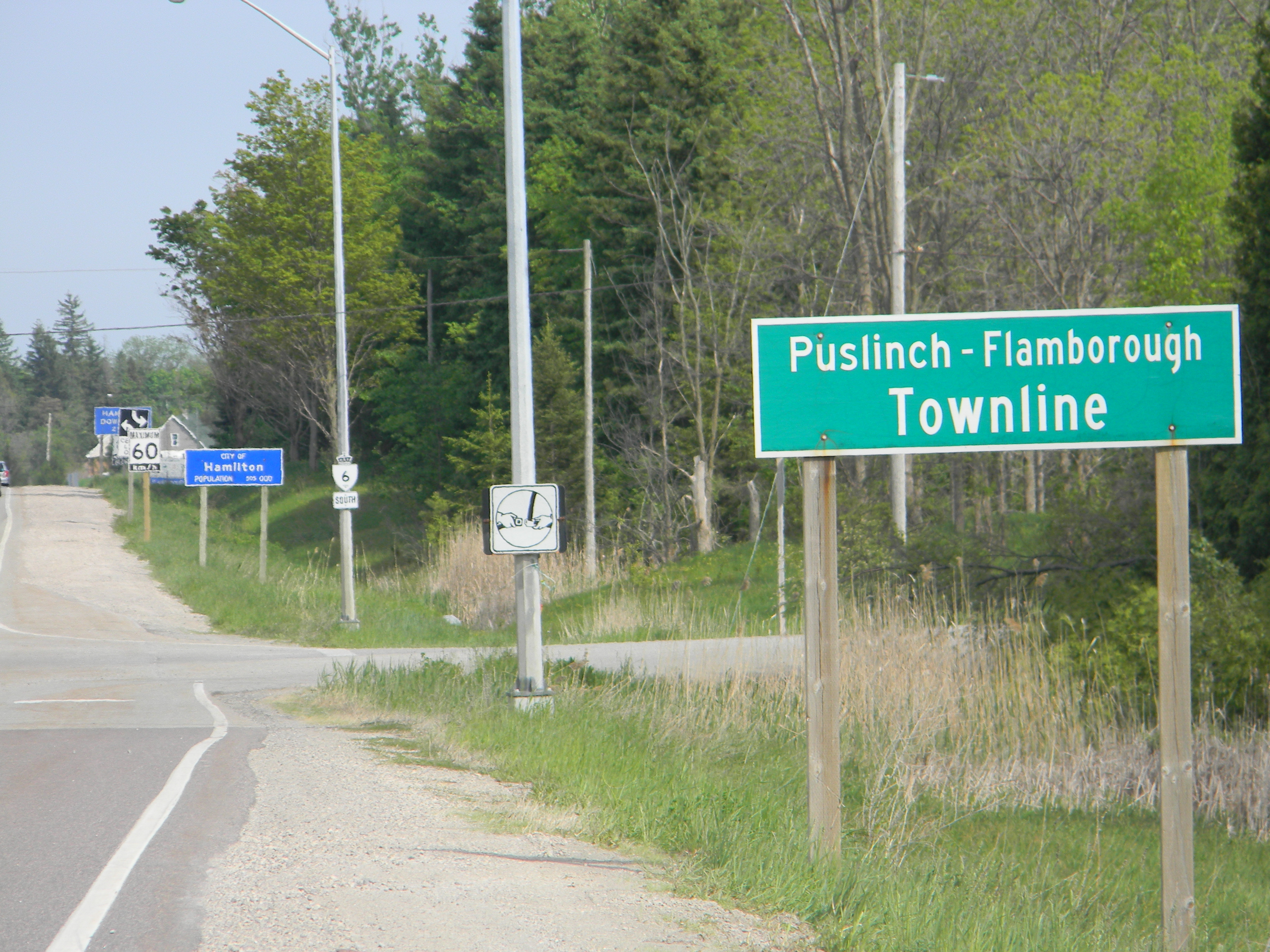
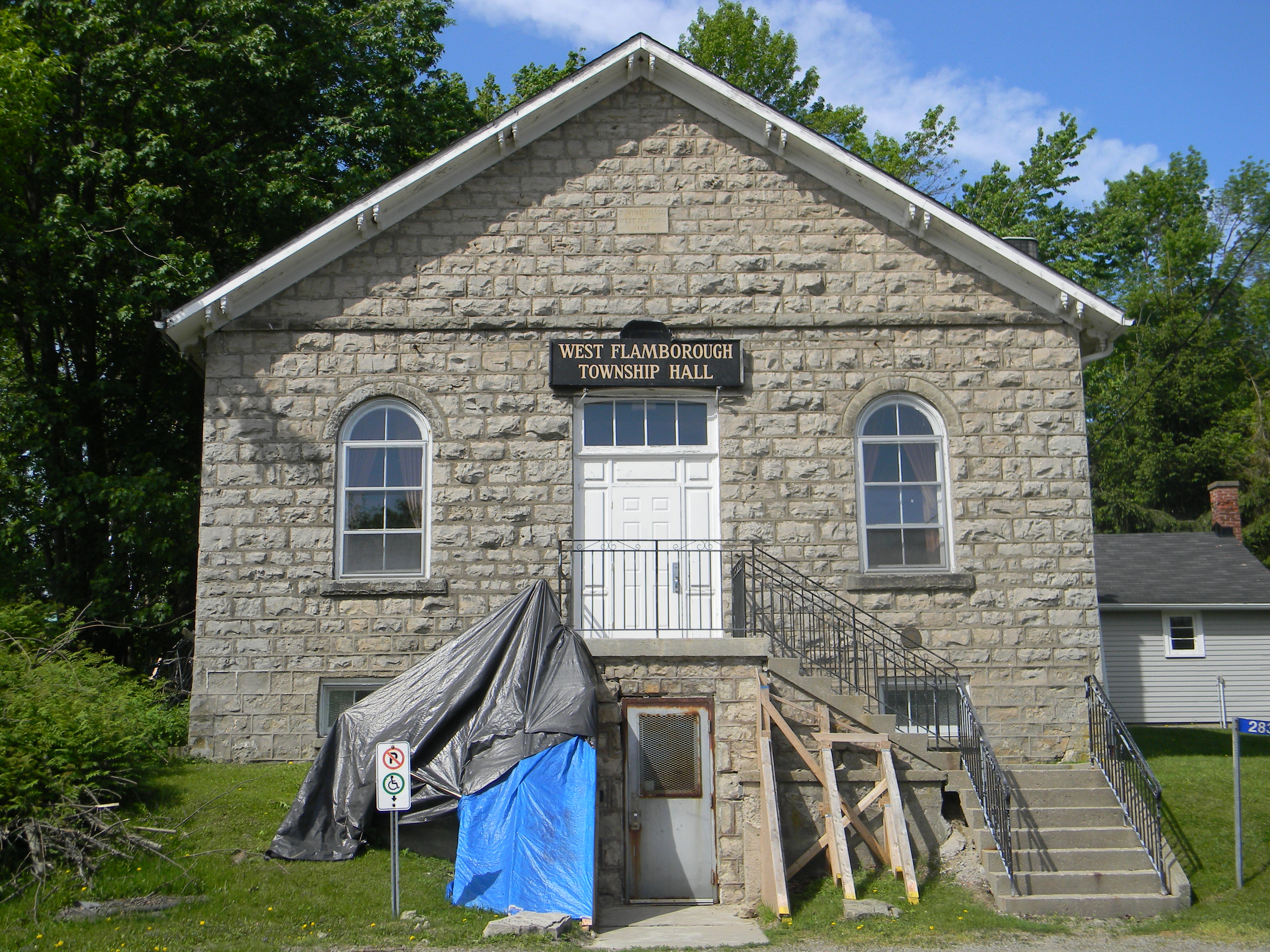
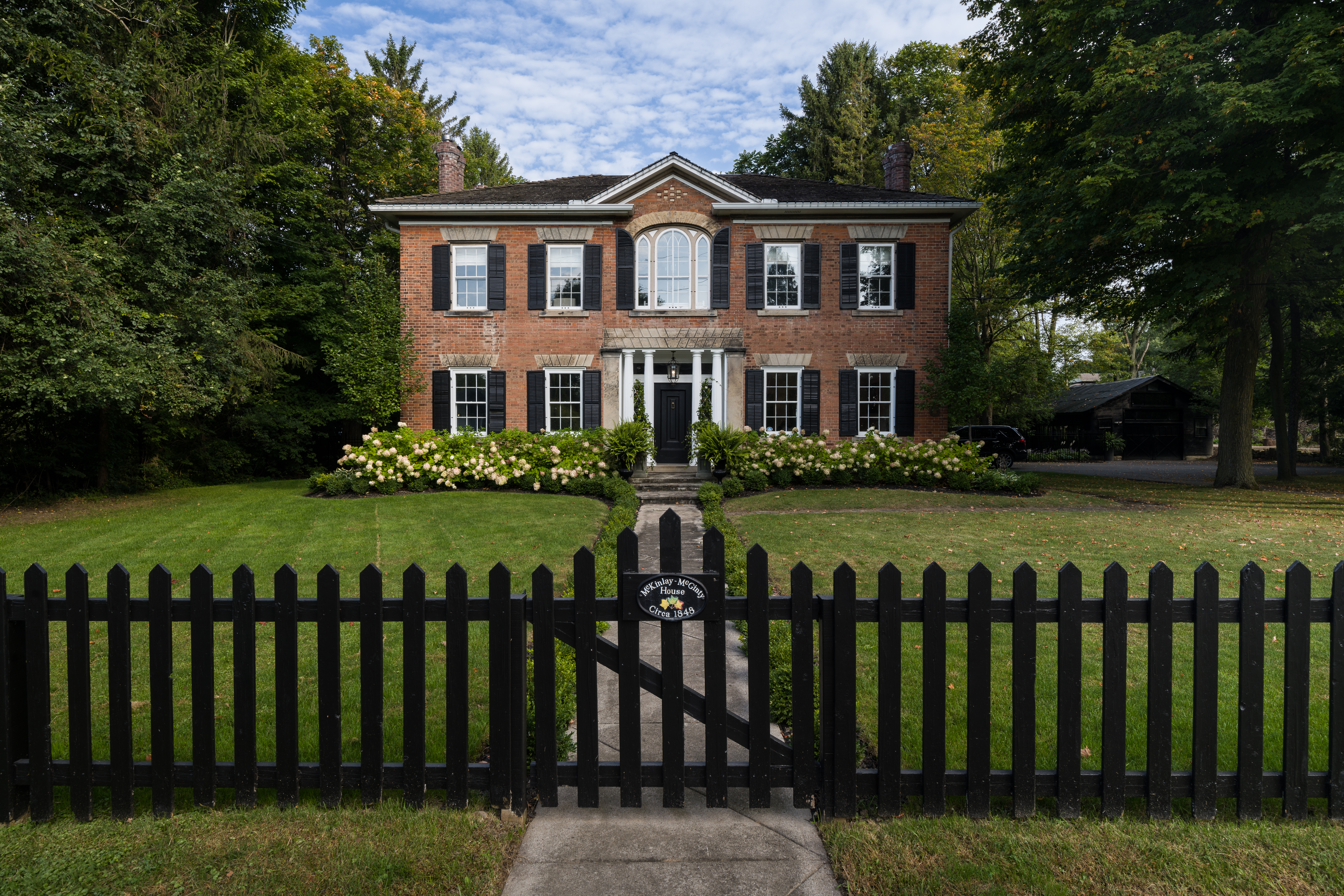
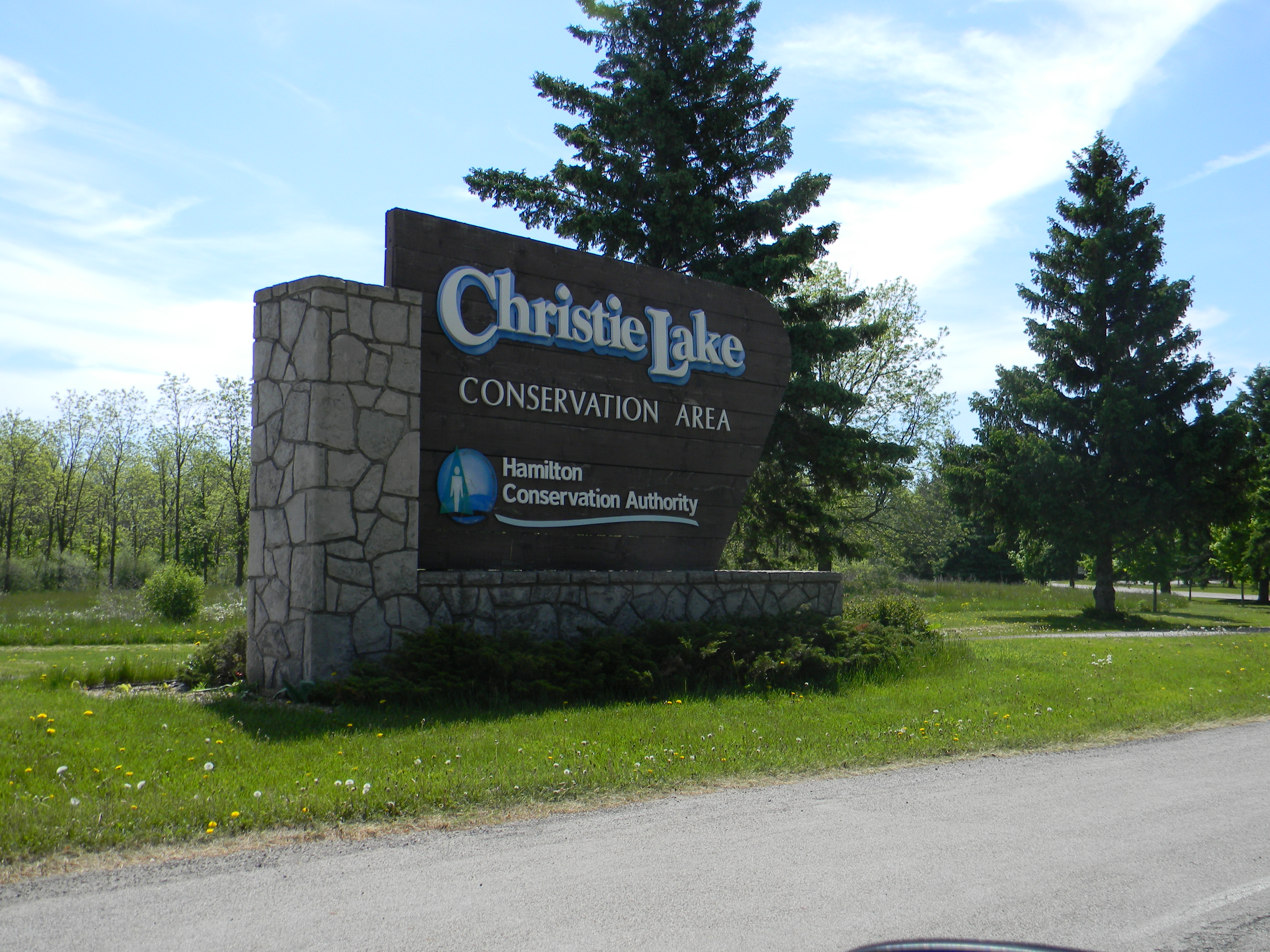
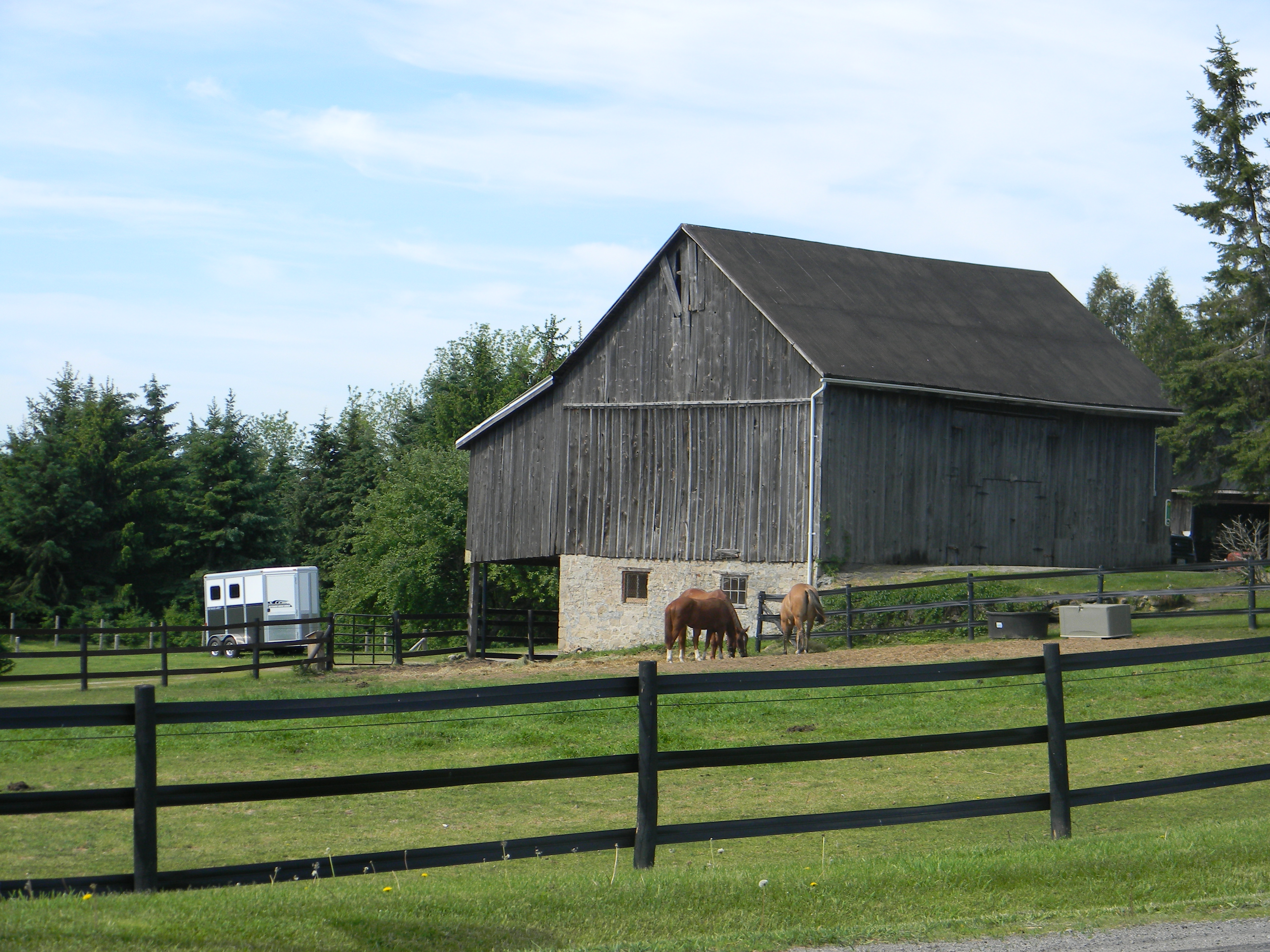
- Puslinch–Flamborough Townline West Flamborough Township Hall McKinlay–McGinty House Christie Lake Conservation Area Farm

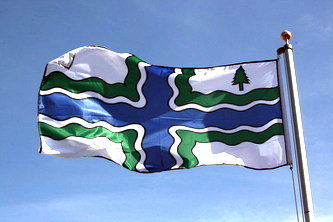
- Flag Coat of arms Logo
- Motto: United We Thrive
- Location within City of Hamilton
- Coordinates: 43.346°N 80.055°W
- Country: Canada
- Province: Ontario
- City: Hamilton
- Incorporated: 1971; 55 years ago (town)
- Amalgamated: January 1, 2001; 25 years ago

Government
  - MP: Dan Muys
  - MPP: Donna Skelly
- Time zone: UTC−05:00 (EST)
  - Summer (DST): UTC−04:00 (EDT)
- Forward sortation area: L0R and L9H
- Area codes: 905, 289, and 365

Flamborough is a community in the city of Hamilton in the Canadian province of Ontario. Prior to its amalgamation in 2001, Flamborough comprised the former townships of East Flamborough, West Flamborough, and Beverly, as well as the village of Waterdown. The largest suburban community is the former village of Waterdown, containing one third of the population. Other Flamborough communities include Carlisle, Christie's Corners, Clappison's Corners, Copetown, Freelton, Greensville, Lynden, Kirkwall, Millgrove, Mountsberg, Orkney, Peters Corners, Rockton, Troy, Sheffield, Valens, Strabane and Westover.

== History ==
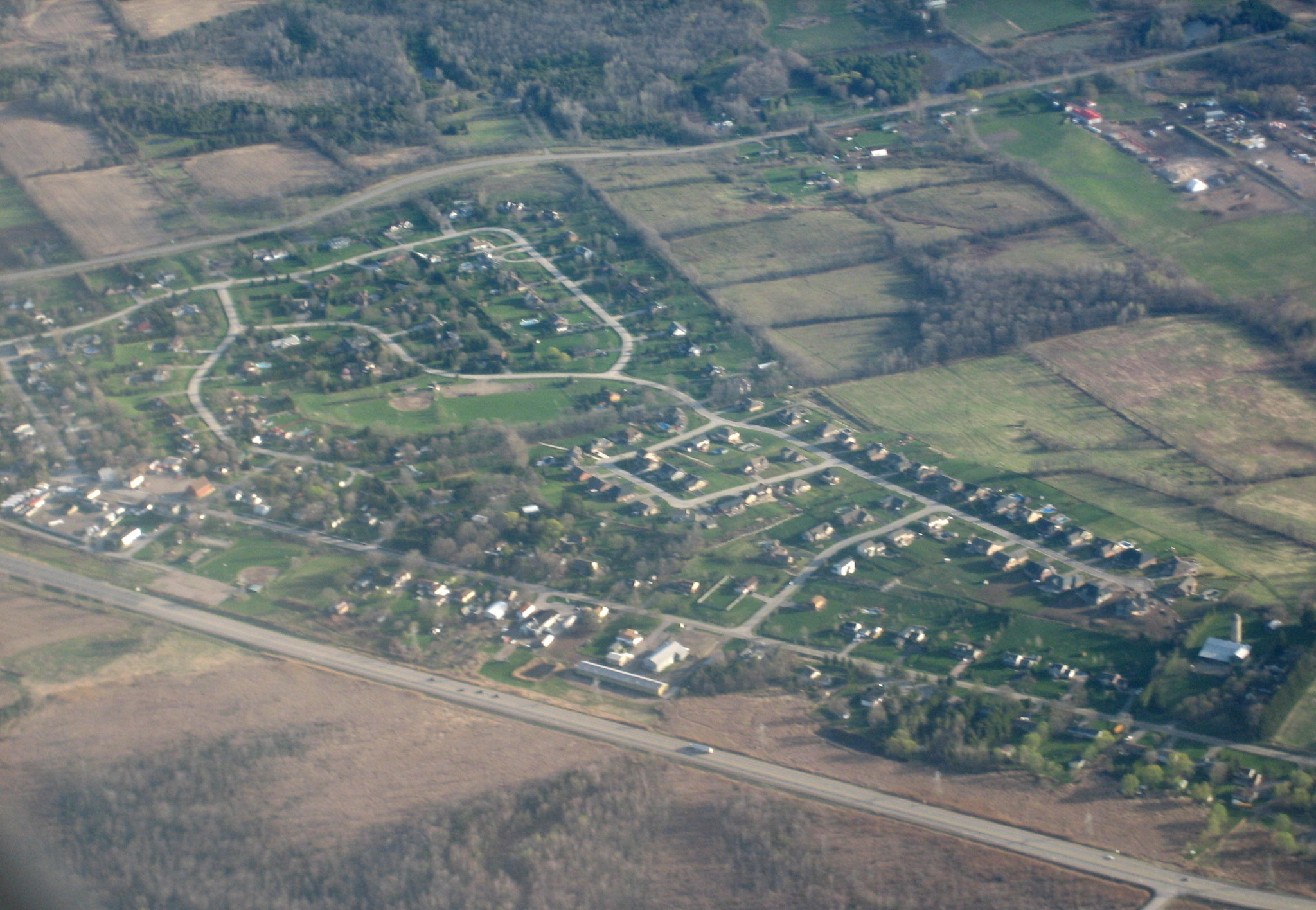
The community of Freelton

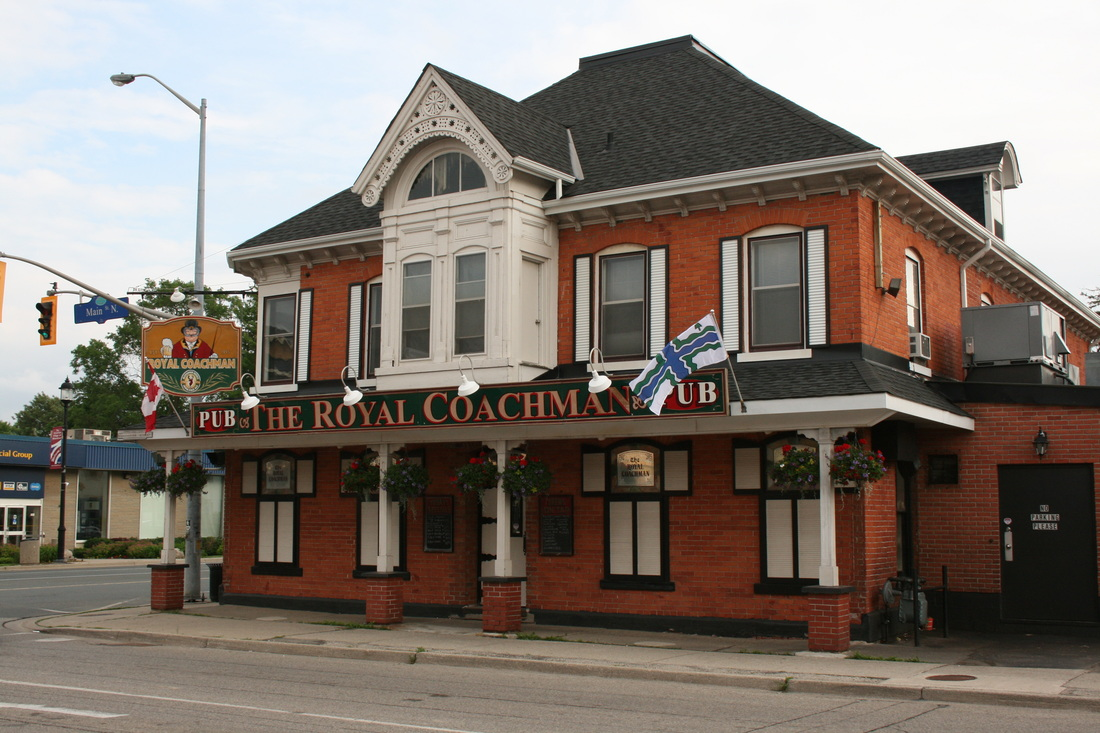
The Royal Coachman was the first business to fly the Flamborough Flag, Waterdown, 2011

The escarpment was originally covered with indigenous trails; two are now known as Snake Road (linking this area to the important waterway at Burlington Bay) and King Road (linking the area to the Burlington shoreline). The First Nations settlement of Tinawatawa is said to have been located near Westover, but some sources place it closer to Brantford. Lake Medad, located to the east of Waterdown, was a sacred meeting place for the area’s indigenous peoples—numerous accounts and stories attest to this.

The Chonnonton Nation lived in the area until they were displaced by the Haudenosaunee during the Beaver Wars of the 17th century (archaeological remains of the Chonnonton have been preserved in Waterdown's Souharissen Natural Area.) The first recorded European to visit the area was when the French explorers La Salle and Joliet met near Tinawatawa, now Westover on September 24, 1669. When New France was conquered by in 1760, the territory fell under the protection of the British Crown. With the Treaty of Niagara establishing peace with France's Indigenous allies, English settlers began to appear in the area.

After the American Revolution in 1783 and the creation of Upper Canada, Treaty No. 3 was established between the Crown and Mississauga Nation in 1792. Soon after, land at the western end of Lake Ontario was surveyed and organized into townships, which included East Flamborough, West Flamborough and Beverly. Governor's Road (also known as Queen's Highway 99 and later Regional Roads 399 and 299) was built on the border with neighbouring Ancaster Township in 1794–95, linking York (later Toronto) and London.

East Flamborough almost had a much different identity. Following the bloody collapse of the Bourbon Monarchy during the 1789–99 French Revolution, several thousand members of the French nobility sought refuge in London, England. The English were quick to move these refugees out of their capital, and jumped at the suggestion to have them settled in Canada. The township of East Flamborough was set aside (far away from the French settlers of Lower Canada) for L’Abbe Philippe Jean Louis des Jardins and Le Chevalier Lecorne. Before settlement could begin, however, France experienced a counter-revolution (leading to the rise of Napoleon Bonaparte) that allowed the nobility to return. Had East Flamborough become a haven for the members of France’s outcast upper class the story of this area would have been radically different.

Perhaps the most dramatic event in Flamborough’s modern history occurred during the War of 1812, when over 2,000 Indigenous refugees arrived in the fall of 1813. Following the British defeat in the Battle of Moraviantown, all of southwestern Ontario was exposed to the ravages of the American army, and all the Indigenous People and settlers who could, fled to safety in the shadow of the British army at Burlington Heights. These refugees included the surviving warriors and families of Tecumseh’s Confederacy, Delawares who had escaped the destruction of their village on the Thames, and many from the Six Nations of the Grand River who feared they might meet a similar fate. The refugees filled the lower concessions of East and West Flamborough, stretching from Dundas to Burlington. Among the refugees were Tecumseh’s sister and successor, Tecumpease, and his brother Tenkswatawa, also known as the Prophet. Here they spent a dreadful winter, many suffering from disease and malnutrition. The landscape was stripped bare to feed them, and the Indian Department struggled to keep them supplied with the necessities of life. Many of the refugees stayed in Flamborough for nearly two years, huddled in their wigwams, struggling to survive. The last of the refugees only left when news of the peace arrived in the spring of 1815. Overall, the War of 1812 was a disaster for the Anishinaabe in this area. Despite their losses fighting for the British Crown, they gained nothing for their service.

In 1816, among fears that the Burlington Heights community would not survive another winter, Kahkewaquonaby went to live on his father’s farm in Stoney Creek. Two years later, the Credit River Mississauga sold their 648,000 acre inland tract of land. The tribe, described as "thin and miserable" had no choice: they needed the proceeds from the sale in order to survive. Another two years later, in 1820, they sold their reserves around the mouths of Bronte Creek, Oakville Creek, and the Credit River, leaving the Credit River Mississauga nothing more than 200 acres of land on the east side of their namesake river. The entire Nation now had less land than many contemporary pioneering families.

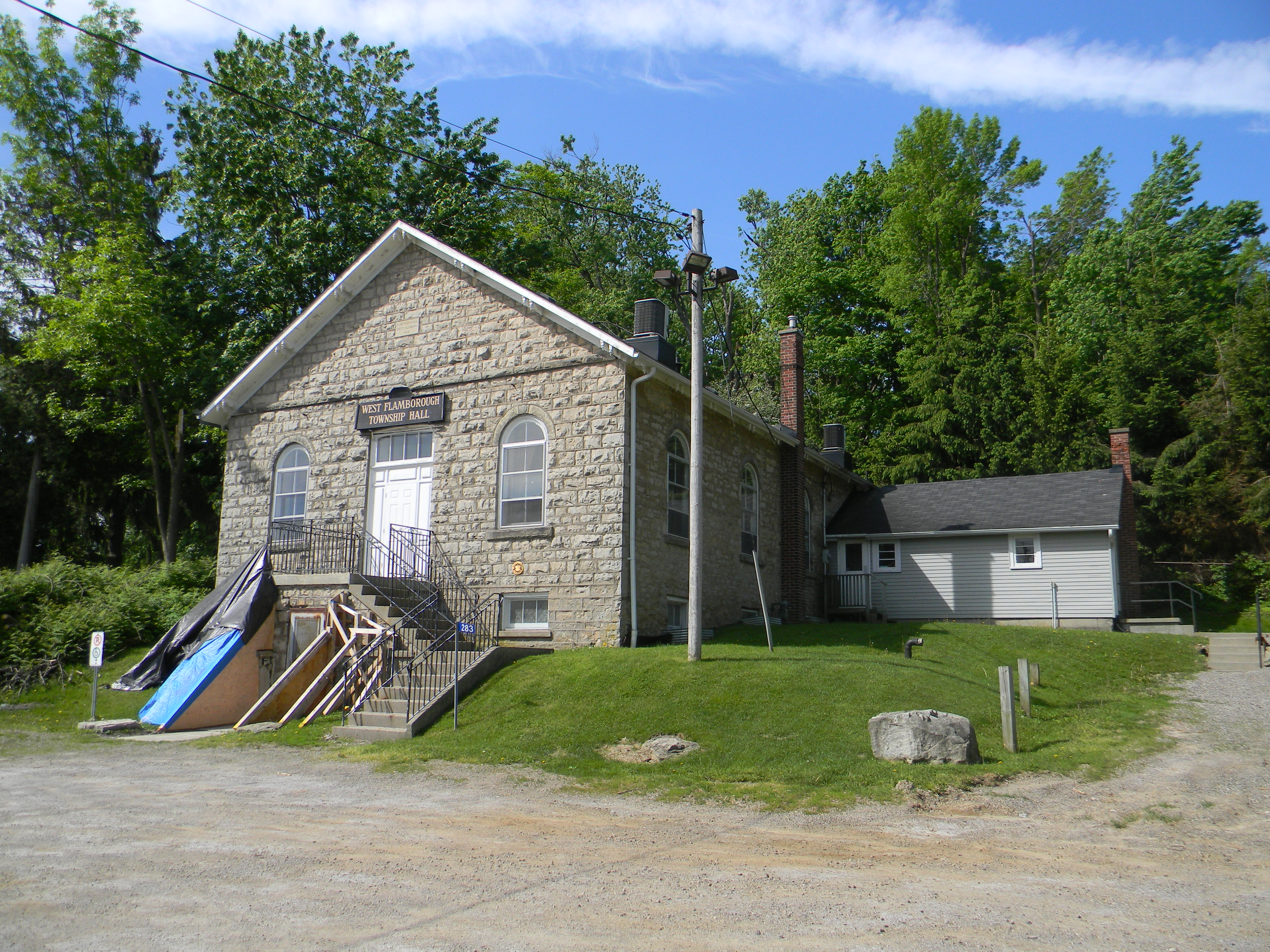
Township Hall in West Flamborough

The three townships and Waterdown were founding constituents of Wentworth County in 1816. Waterdown was created in 1879 from that part of East Flamborough above the Niagara Escarpment and within approximately a kilometre of King's Highway No. 5. The town of Dundas was created from parts of West Flamborough and Ancaster Townships.

In 1974, Flamborough Township was created by amalgamating the townships of East Flamborough, West Flamborough and Beverly with the village of Waterdown. At the same time, a small portion of Beverly Township near the community of Clyde was ceded to North Dumfries Township and a more populous but smaller portion of East Flamborough near the community of Aldershot was ceded to Burlington. Flamborough became a town in 1985.

In 2001, the provincial government amalgamated Flamborough with Ancaster, Dundas, Glanbrook, and Stoney Creek into the enlarged City of Hamilton.

The amalgamation was bitterly and unsuccessfully protested by some Flamborough residents and those of adjacent communities, particularly since the incumbent Progressive Conservative MPP, Toni Skarica's government had promised in the previous election that the amalgamation would not occur. Skarica resigned in protest, but the amalgamation was not rescinded.

The population of Flamborough at the 2001 census was 37,796. By the 2006 census, its population had increased to 39,220.

== Flag and Coat of Arms ==
Flamborough Coat of Arms

The Flamborough Grant of Arms was published in the Canada Gazette in 2011.

== Geography and natural attractions ==
Much of Flamborough is located on top of the Niagara Escarpment; thus the Bruce Trail passes through the area. Although relatively flat in the south, a slow but steady incline is observable until reaching the Wellington County line which is the approximate height of land dividing two watersheds. The Beverly Swamp, located in the western part of the former Beverly Township, is another important physiographic area.

Natural attractions operated by the Hamilton Conservation Authority include:

- Westfield Heritage Centre, a living history museum containing pioneer era buildings moved from other locations across Ontario
- Valens Conservation Area, offering camping and boating at its reservoir
- Christie Lake, swimming and stocked fishing at its reservoir
- Spencer Gorge Conservation Area, with views of the falls and city below while hiking on the Bruce Trail.

=== Waterdown's Souharissen Natural Area ===
On August 21, 2014, the Souharissen Natural Area was dedicated in Waterdown by the Honourable David C. Onley, 28th Lieutenant Governor of Ontario, and Chief Bryan Laforme and Council of the Mississaugas of the New Credit First Nation. Over 50 people attended the dedication including David Sweet MP, Councillor Judi Partridge, Carolyn King, United Empire Loyalists, and other members of the Mississaugas of the New Credit. The day began with the lighting of the first sacred fire in over two centuries, signalling the formal return of the Mississaugas to their traditional territory.

The Souharissen Natural Area covers 27 acres in the Village of Waterdown, and is the result of years of work following the discovery of 104 Indigenous archeological sites in the Waterdown Bay Development Area in 2005.

Along with the Aboriginal sites, the foundations of an early 19th-century dwelling were uncovered in the area. This dwelling may have been used by the first European settlers of Waterdown, Alexander Brown and Merren Grierson. The Natural Area includes a plaque identifying this important landmark, as well as detailing the histories of Merren Grierson and Alexander Brown, that was unveiled by the Lieutenant Governor, Chief LaForme and researcher Kekoa Reinebold.

Later that day a community feast was held in Waterdown at a local residence in honour of the return of the Mississaugas of the New Credit First Nation to Flamborough, as well as the visit by both the Lieutenant Governor of Ontario and Chief of the Mississaugas of the New Credit. Everyone who was part of the dedication, including the Lieutenant Governor and Chief Laforme attended.

== Economy and commercial attractions ==
After early European settlers had cleared the land of pine and oak forests, they began subsistence and then export farming. Disregarding the swamp and the excessively rocky areas of the Mountsberg area, the land is devoted chiefly to agriculture. Much of the arable land is devoted to raising corn, strawberries and cash crops.

In recent decades, Flamborough has become home to commuters and hobby farmers in the Golden Horseshoe. It has easy access to secondary highways, especially with the opening of an interchange with Highway 403 at Waterdown Road, granting easier access for traffic to/from Toronto.

Notable attractions operated as commercial enterprises include:

- African Lion Safari, with land mammals and birds of prey in an open air zoo
- Flamboro Downs, featuring harness racing, and slot machines
- Flamboro Speedway, featuring car racing
- Rockton Airport, a privately owned Sailplane aerodrome, offering flight training and visitor rides.
- Rockton World's Fair, an agricultural exhibition held every Thanksgiving Weekend (Canadian)

== Local Media ==
The Flamborough Review was a community newspaper published every Thursday by Metroland Media. Metroland acquired the Review in 2003.

== See also ==
- List of townships in Ontario
