= Regional Municipality of Hamilton–Wentworth =

- Dissolved regional municipality
- Flag Logo

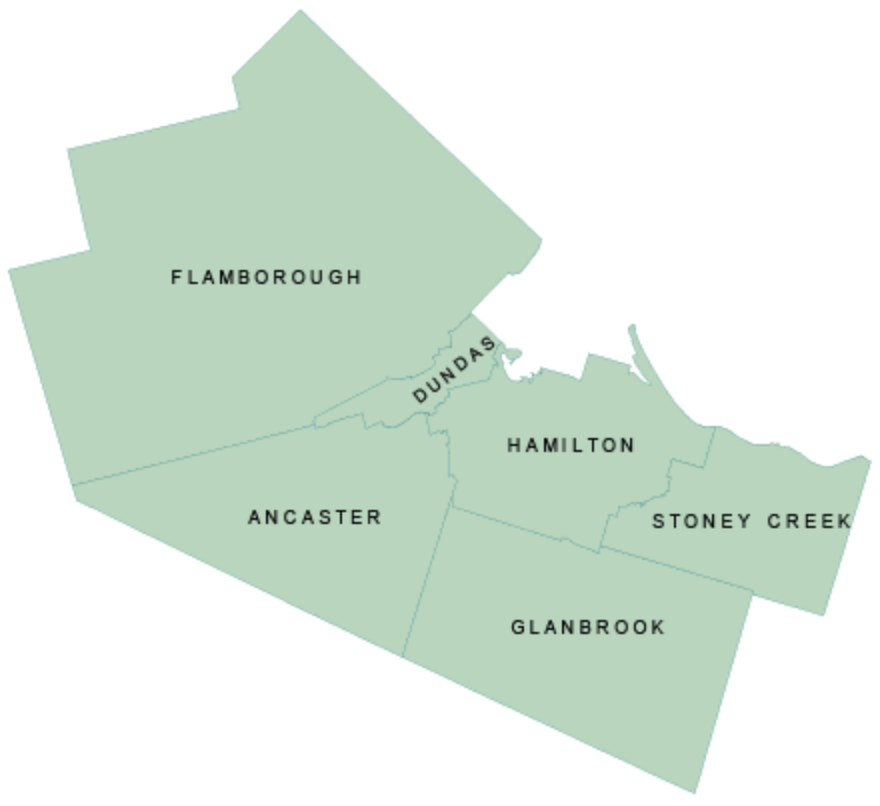
- Municipal Boundaries of the former Regional Municipality of Hamilton–Wentworth.
- Country: Canada
- Province: Ontario
- Region: Golden Horseshoe
- Created: 1974
- Dissolved: 2001

Area
  - Total: 1,118.31 km^{2} (431.78 sq mi)

Population (1996)
  - Total: 467,799
- Time zone: UTC−05:00 (EST)
  - Summer (DST): UTC−04:00 (DST)
- Area codes: 905, 289, and 365
- Seat: Hamilton
- Municipalities: City of Hamilton; Town of Stoney Creek; Town of Ancaster; Township of Flamborough; Town of Dundas; Township of Glanbrook

The Regional Municipality of Hamilton–Wentworth was an upper-tier regional municipality forming a metropolitan area in Ontario, Canada, that existed between January 1, 1974, and January 1, 2001. It was composed of six municipalities, centered on and including the City of Hamilton, and existed to coordinate certain shared services, such as policing and public transit, for those municipalities. It was created through the restructuring of Wentworth County, and was one of the last such governments to be created in Ontario.

The regional municipality was dissolved in 2001, and its constituent municipalities were amalgamated to form the current single-tier City of Hamilton, with a 2021 total population of 569,353.

== Overview ==
Regional Municipalities were an experiment in two-tiered municipalities created between the late 1960s to mid-1970s. They existed mainly in the Golden Horseshoe of southern Ontario, but also existed in the form of the Regional Municipality of Sudbury in northern Ontario and the Regional Municipality of Ottawa-Carleton in eastern Ontario. The regions were proved somewhat controversial upon their creation and the Regional Municipality of Hamilton–Wentworth was one of the last created by this process. Almost immediately after its creation, some sort of merger was advocated, with "Wentworth" being among some of the candidate names for the new megacity, despite the City of Hamilton functioning as the core city for the Region as a whole.

The Regional Municipality of Hamilton–Wentworth was established as an Upper-Tier Municipality and comprised the bulk of the former Wentworth County, which it replaced. Its Lower-Tier Municipalities were, in order of population, the city of Hamilton, the town (later city) of Stoney Creek, the town of Ancaster, the town of Flamborough, the town of Dundas and the township of Glanbrook.

The Region provided policing, social services, and public transit (by taking over Hamilton Street Railway), while the lower-tier provided Fire Services and Recreation Services; although, both tiers shared the responsibility for maintaining Roads and Water. It was governed by a Regional Chair who presided over a Regional Council with representatives from each of Hamilton's wards and two each from other constituent municipalities. Near the end of its existence, the Regional Chair was chosen by Direct Election.

== History ==
The Regional Municipality of Hamilton–Wentworth was created by Act of the Legislative Assembly of Ontario in 1973, which took effect on January 1, 1974. The creation of the Regional Municipality resulted in the consolidation of the former municipalities of Wentworth County into six new municipalities:

Creation of area municipalities in the Regional Municipality of Hamilton–Wentworth (1974)
Area municipality	Created from	Police villages dissolved
Township of Flamborough	Township of East Flamborough, Village of Waterdown, annexing portions of the Townships of Beverly, and West Flamborough	Freelton, Lynden
Township of Glanbrook	Townships of Binbrook and Glanford	
Town of Dundas	Town of Dundas, annexing portions of the Townships of Ancaster and West Flamborough	
Town of Ancaster	Township of Ancaster, annexing portions of the Town of Dundas	Ancaster
Town of Stoney Creek	Town of Stoney Creek, Township of Saltfleet	
City of Hamilton	City of Hamilton	

== Merger ==
A different Progressive Conservative government amalgamated all of the constituent municipalities in Hamilton–Wentworth into the larger single-tier City of Hamilton in 2001, against great opposition from its suburban and rural parts. This was part of a broader series of municipal reorganizations in urban and rural Ontario, and was also the fate of Metropolitan Toronto, the Regional Municipality of Ottawa–Carleton, Chatham-Kent, Prince Edward County, and many others.
