= Copetown =

Coordinates: 43°14′39.09″N 80°3′22.94″W

The Flamborough Community Coat of Arms

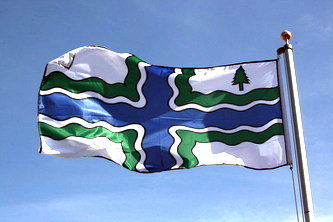
The Flag of Flamborough (Copetown is one of the most southern communities found in Flamborough)

Copetown is a rural neighbourhood of the city of Hamilton, Ontario, Canada, located northeast of Brantford. William Cope, a United Empire Loyalist from the U.S. state of New York settled here in 1794. The community was renamed after his son Conradt in 1851. The current population of this community is approximately 130 residents.

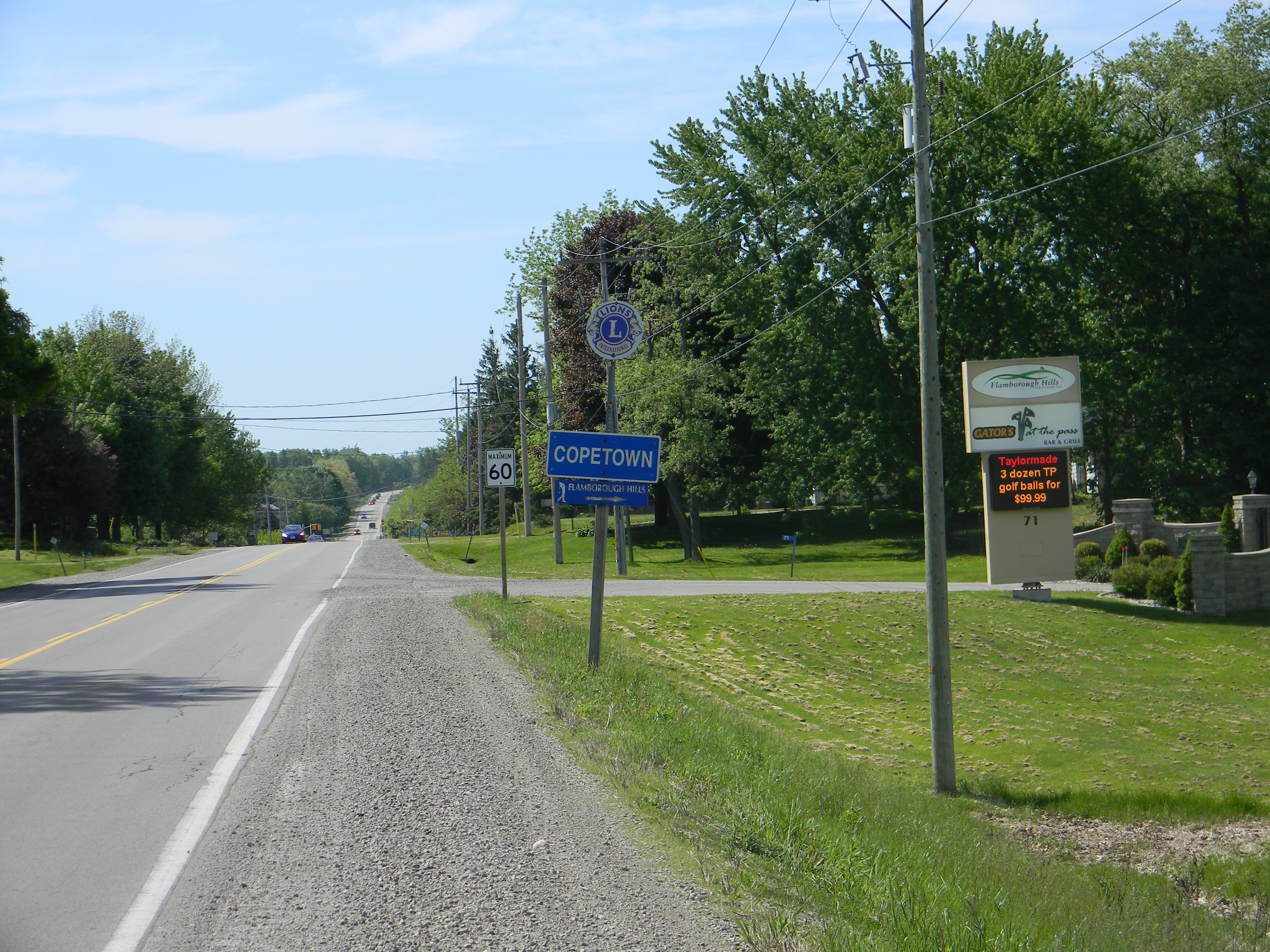
Copetown

This community is located within the 905 area code for telephones and the postal forward sortation area in this region is L0R. Dundas Hill is located nearby, signifying its closeness to Dundas. The community is located 40 miles (64 km) away from Toronto. Copetown is a short eastbound drive away from Flamboro Downs and is located relatively close to downtown Dundas.

== Summary ==
Residential areas are nearby; approximately 67% of the 130 people who reside in Copetown have ownership of their home. However, all family units that apply for mortgage applications in Copetown consists of married couples with the average age of a Copetown mortgage holder being 36 years of age. Agriculture and services are two major industries in Copetown; with options available to either buy the products that already been picked by the farmer or for the consumer to pick the product himself out of the field. Apple season in Copetown typically lasts from August 18 until October 20; when the threats of winter frost first emerge. There are several commercial enterprises in Copetown (including the general store located off Highway 52 and the feed mill off Railway Street). For the local senior citizens, there is a retirement community that is located in the village on the outskirts of Hamilton.

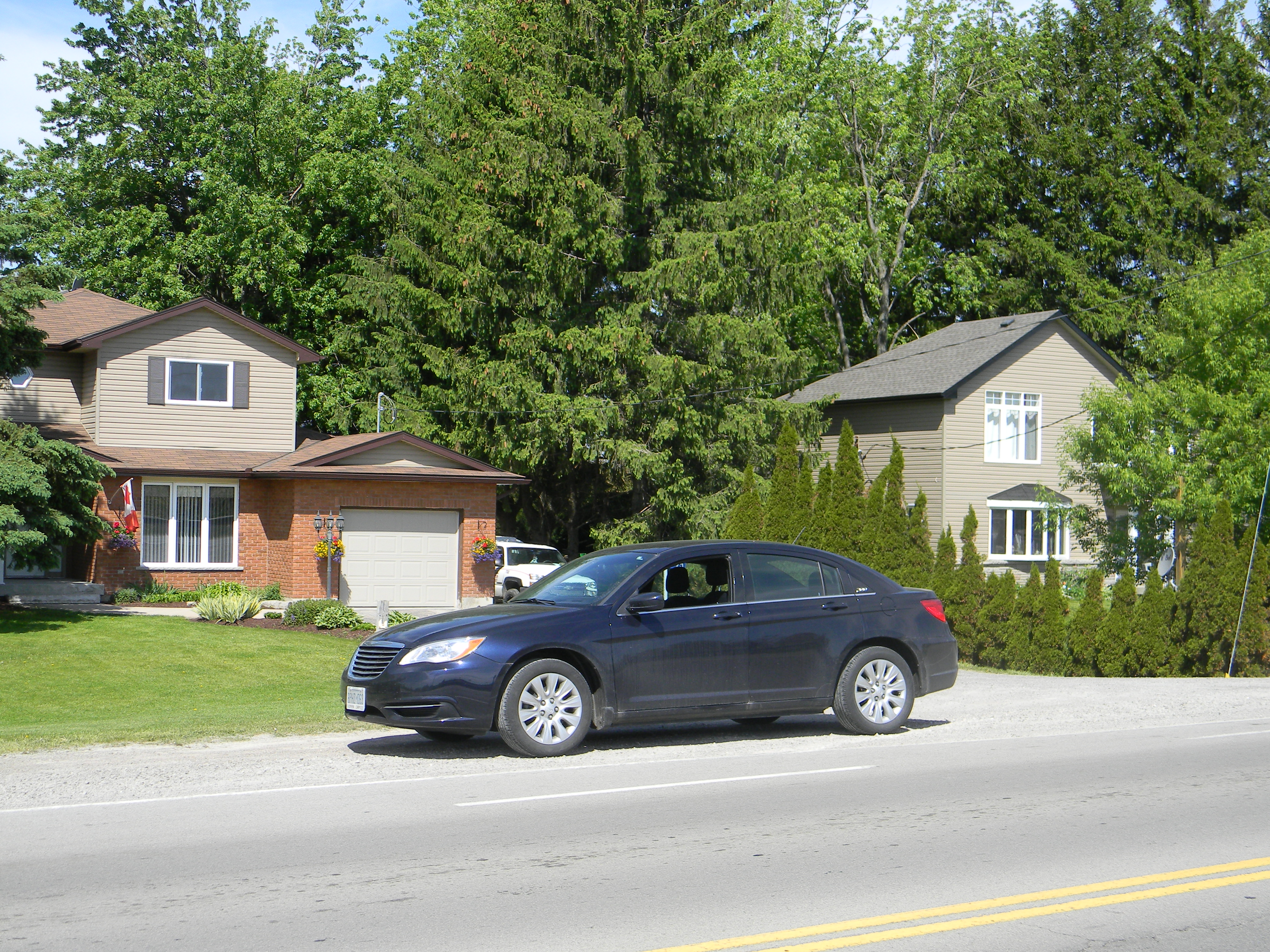
Copetown

Copetown also has a Lions Community Centre which is considered to be a service club for adults. Meetings take place first and third Monday during the months of September through June at 7 o'clock in the evening. Membership is required and the official language of the organization is English. The Copetowns are located in Ward 13 of the regional Lions Association and elections take place annually in April.

From the CN/VIA Railway, one can see the Quick Feeds Ltd. feed mill after the bridge. This location is actually where the old Copetown station used to be prior to closing due to lack of service. The centre of Copetown is the four-way stop at the intersection between Highway 52 and Governors Road. The TH&B railway used to run near Copetown by way of Old Highway 99, Slote Road and crossing Highway 52 just 1.5 kilometres (0.93 mi) south of the centre of Copetown.

=== Education ===
Queen's Rangers Elementary School was built in 1958, named after the rangers who had worked in the area. A Christian school named Rehoboth Christian School operates in this area for the promotion of Christian education in the area for Kindergarten through twelfth grade. Membership in this school is limited to people who have good standing with the Free Reformed Church of North America.

There is high speed internet supplied by a local of Copetown. It is wireless internet and he currently has nine line of sight towers. Sky-fi.net is the supplier.

=== Sports and leisure ===
There are a various number of golf courses within the local area. One of the newest is called Copetown Woods; which was opened in 2003 using 200 acres or 8,700,000 square feet of recycled farmland.

Most of the newer golf courses are pedestrian-friendly and easily accommodate small children being on the property. Food and beverages are offered for all groups and different areas of the course specialize in different components of the game of golf.

A score of 72 is considered to be par for the course at a typical golf course in Copetown; even players who are not as skillful as the PGA Tour pro golfers can get scores into the lower-to-mid 80s after a decent amount of practice.

== Climate ==
Copetown has a continental climate moderated by the Great Lakes and influenced by warm, moist air masses from the south, and cold, dry air from the north.

Recent summers, however, have been hot and dry. The driest summers of the 21st century for this region came in the years 2012, 2015 and 2016. 2014 was a normal precipitation year along with most of the early 2000s and 2009 was an unusually rainy and cold summer for the Copetown area.

Climate data for Copetown
Month	Jan	Feb	Mar	Apr	May	Jun	Jul	Aug	Sep	Oct	Nov	Dec	Year
Record high °C (°F)	12.5 (54.5)	15.0 (59.0)	24.0 (75.2)	31.5 (88.7)	33.0 (91.4)	35.0 (95.0)	38.0 (100.4)	33.5 (92.3)	33.0 (91.4)	26.5 (79.7)	21.0 (69.8)	20.5 (68.9)	38.0 (100.4)
Mean daily maximum °C (°F)	−2.4 (27.7)	−1.3 (29.7)	4.4 (39.9)	12.2 (54.0)	19.4 (66.9)	24.0 (75.2)	26.9 (80.4)	25.3 (77.5)	20.7 (69.3)	13.4 (56.1)	6.8 (44.2)	0.3 (32.5)	12.5 (54.5)
Mean daily minimum °C (°F)	−9.8 (14.4)	−9.6 (14.7)	−4.8 (23.4)	1.3 (34.3)	6.9 (44.4)	11.3 (52.3)	14.5 (58.1)	13.7 (56.7)	9.7 (49.5)	3.7 (38.7)	−0.6 (30.9)	−6.5 (20.3)	2.5 (36.5)
Record low °C (°F)	−31.5 (−24.7)	−30.5 (−22.9)	−23.5 (−10.3)	−13.5 (7.7)	−4.0 (24.8)	1.0 (33.8)	5.0 (41.0)	0.5 (32.9)	−2.0 (28.4)	−8.9 (16.0)	−13.5 (7.7)	−29.0 (−20.2)	−31.5 (−24.7)
Average precipitation mm (inches)	67.8 (2.67)	63.8 (2.51)	78.9 (3.11)	76.2 (3.00)	80.3 (3.16)	84.1 (3.31)	88.5 (3.48)	93.6 (3.69)	94.6 (3.72)	76.2 (3.00)	85.4 (3.36)	88.4 (3.48)	977.8 (38.50)
Source: Environment Canada

== See also ==
- List of communities in Ontario
