= Ontario Highway 53 =

Former Ontario provincial highway

King's Highway 53
- Oxford County Road 55, Brant County Highway 53, Brant County Highway 2/53, Burford RoadRymal Road, Garner Road.

Route information
- Maintained by City of Hamilton
- Length: 76.5 km (47.5 mi)
- Existed: August 14, 1935–April 1, 1997

Major junctions
- West end: Highway 2 – Eastwood
- Highway 403; Highway 24; Highway 2 Highway 6
- East end: Highway 20 / Highway 56 (Upper Centennial Parkway / Rymal Road) – Hamilton, Stoney Creek

Location
- Country: Canada
- Province: Ontario
- Counties: Oxford County, Brant County, Hamilton
- Major cities: Woodstock, Brantford, Ancaster, Ontario, Hamilton, Stoney Creek

Highway system
- Ontario provincial highways; Current; Former; 400-series
← Highway 49	→ Highway 58
Former provincial highways
← Highway 52	Highway 54 →

King's Highway 53, commonly referred to as Highway 53, was a provincially maintained highway in the southern portion of the Canadian province of Ontario that connected Woodstock to Hamilton via Brantford. The 76.5-kilometre (47.5 mi) route served as a southerly bypass to Highway 2, avoiding Paris, Ancaster and Hamilton. In addition to the previously mentioned cities, Highway 53 served the communities of Cathcart and Burford.

First designated in 1935, the route remained in place until it was downloaded to local jurisdiction in 1997. For much of its history, the road was concurrent with Highway 2 between Woodstock and Eastwood, as well as between Brantford and Ancaster. Today the route is known by various local names, including Oxford County Road 55, Brant County Highway 53, Wilson Street, Garner Road and Rymal Road. It serves as an alternative to Highway 2 or Highway 403.

== Route description ==
Highway 2 and Highway 53 split southwest of Ancaster

The route of former Highway 53 began in the west at Oxford County Road 2, formerly Highway 2. From the community of Eastwood, which lies east of Woodstock, the road travelled southeast as Oxford County Road 55 and crosses Highway 403, with which there is an interchange. Soon thereafter, the route entered the community of Muir, at the Oxford County and County of Brant boundary. East of this point the route is known as Brant County Highway 53, where it continued southeast passing through the community of Cathcart. It eventually straightened out and travelled east through Burford. As the road approached Brantford, intersecting Highway 24 (Rest Acres Road), it skirted the southern edge of Brantford Municipal Airport.

Within Brantford, the former highway is now known as Colborne Street, although the section through downtown Brantford is a one-way street; westbound traffic is directed onto Dalhousie Street. The route crossed the Grand River west of downtown, intersecting and becoming concurrent with former Highway 2 at Brant Avenue. It intersected the southern terminus of what is now Wayne Gretzky Parkway, towards the eastern end of town, and eventually crossed a Southern Ontario Railway track into the community of Cainsville. Soon after, the route passed through the community of Langford and then entered Hamilton.

== History ==
Highway 53 was created in the mid-1930s to bypass the congested section of Highway 2 between Woodstock and Brantford. It was later extended into Hamilton to improve the layout of highways around that city, specifically Highway 20A.

On August 14, 1935, the Department of Highways (DHO) assumed the Burford Road, between Highway 2 in Eastwood and Highway 24 (Mount Pleasant Street) in Brantford, as a provincial highway. The new Highway 53 entered Brantford along Burford Street, turning onto Oxford Street at Welsh Street and becoming concurrent with Highway 24 to cross the Grand River. On the opposite side, Highway 53 ended at Highway 2 (Brant Avenue). Burford and Oxford streets have since been renamed as Colborne Street West. At its western terminus, the route intersected Highway 2 in Eastwood, then travelled concurrently with it for 7.7 km (4.8 mi) west into Woodstock.

In 1937, a series of route renumberings took place in the Hamilton area. Among these was the renumbering of Highway 20A, which prior to then followed Upper Gage Avenue to Rymal Road. Rymal Road was also numbered Highway 20A from Duff's Corners, south of Ancaster, to Elfrida, at the junction of Rymal Road and Centennial Parkway (Highway 20). Following the renumbering, the route north into Hamilton became Highway 55, while Garner Road and Rymal Road became an extension of Highway 53. To connect the two sections of the route, a concurrency was established along Highway 2 between Brantford and Duff's Corners. The highway was fully paved by 1939, though most sections of it had been paved when it was commissioned as a provincial highway. The only unpaved section, between Eastwood and Burford, was paved in 1937 and 1938.

In 1954, the concurrency with Highway 2 near Woodstock was discontinued, establishing the western terminus at Eastwood. The route remained this way until the late 1990s. In 1997, the remainder of Highway 53 was downloaded to the Regional Municipality of Oxford County, Brant County, and the City of Hamilton (formerly the Regional Municipality of Hamilton-Wentworth). The road is now known as Oxford County Road 55, Brant County Highway 53, and Brant County Highway 2/53 (for being co-signed with fellow defunct road Highway 2). In Hamilton, the road is simply known as Rymal Road and Garner Road. The former is named after William Rymal, (1759–1852), farmer and one of earliest settlers on the Hamilton mountain.

== Major intersections ==
The following table lists the major junctions along Highway 53, as noted by the Ministry of Transportation of Ontario. In addition, it includes some minor junctions.

Division	Location	km	mi	Destinations	Notes
Oxford	Eastwood	0.0	0.0	Highway 2 – Woodstock, Paris	
Oxford	Norwich	2.1	1.3	County Road 15 (Towerline Road)	
Oxford	Norwich	3.4	2.1	Highway 403 – Hamilton, London	Exit 6
Oxford	Muir	6.8	4.2	County Road 22 / County Road 129 south / County Road 130 north	
Brant	Muir	6.8	4.2	County Road 22 / County Road 129 south / County Road 130 north	
Brant	Brant County	14.8	9.2	County Road 25 (Middle Townline Road)	
Brant	Brant County	17.5	10.9	County Road 202 (Harley Road)	Formerly County Road 2
Brant	Burford	22.2	13.8	County Road 16 (Bishops Gate Road)	
Brant	Brant County	26.4	16.4	Highway 24 – Simcoe	Beginning of former Highway 24 concurrency, prior to completion of Highway 403
Brant	Brant County	30.3	18.8	County Road 7 (Pleasant Ridge Road)	
Brant	Brantford	33.0	20.5	County Road 24 (Mount Pleasant Street)	
Brant	Brantford	34.1	21.2	Highway 2 west (Brant Avenue)	Beginning of Highway 2 concurrency; end of former Highway 24 concurrency, prior to completion of Highway 403; eastbound Highway 2 / 53 via Colborne Street; westbound Highway 2 / 53 via Dalhousie Street
Brant	Brantford	36.5	22.7	Colborne Street / Dalhousie Street	Eastbound Highway 2 / 53 via Colborne Street; westbound Highway 2 / 53 via Dalhousie Street
Brant	Brantford	36.8	22.9	Wayne Gretzky Parkway	
Brant	Cainsville	40.4	25.1	Highway 54 south – Cayuga	
Brant	Cainsville	42.1	26.2	County Road 17 (Jerseyville Road) – Jerseyville	
Brant	Langford	47.1	29.3	County Road 8 (White Swan Road) – Onondaga	
Hamilton	Ancaster	48.8	30.3	City Road 203 north (Sunny Ridge Road) – Jerseyville	
Hamilton	Ancaster	53.7	33.4	Highway 52 north	
Hamilton	Ancaster	55.3	34.4	Highway 2 east – Toronto	
Hamilton	Ancaster	59.0	36.7	Fiddlers Green Road	
Hamilton	Ancaster	60.9	37.8	Southcote Road	
Hamilton	Ancaster	63.5	39.5	Glancaster Road	
Hamilton	Ryckmans Corner	66.4	41.3	Upper James Street	Formerly Highway 6
Hamilton	Hannon	69.1	42.9	City Road 626 (Miles Road)	
Hamilton	Hannon	70.9	44.1	City Road 634 (Nebb Road)	
Hamilton	Stoney Creek	73.3	45.5	Upper Mount Albion Road	
Hamilton	Stoney Creek	74.1	46.0	City Road 614 (Fletcher Road)	
Hamilton	Stoney Creek	76.5	47.5	Highway 20 / Highway 56 – Niagara Falls	
1.000 mi = 1.609 km; 1.000 km = 0.621 mi
