= Ontario Highway 403 =

Controlled-access highway in Ontario, Canada

Highway 403
- Alexander Graham Bell Parkway; Brantford Bypass; Chedoke Expressway; Hamilton Expressway
- Highway 403 highlighted in red

Route information
- Maintained by Ministry of Transportation of Ontario
- Length: 125.2 km (77.8 mi)
- History: Proposed 1950s; Opened December 1, 1963; Completed August 15, 1997

Major junctions
- West end: Highway 401 near Woodstock
- Lincoln M. Alexander Parkway in Hamilton; 407 ETR / Queen Elizabeth Way in Burlington; 407 ETR in Mississauga; Highway 410 in Mississauga
- East end: Highway 401 in Mississauga

Location
- Country: Canada
- Province: Ontario
- Regions: Oxford, Brant, Halton, Peel
- Major cities: Woodstock, Brantford, Hamilton, Burlington, Oakville, Mississauga

Highway system
- Ontario provincial highways; Current; Former; 400-series
← Highway 402	→ Highway 404

King's Highway 403 (pronounced "four-oh-three"), or simply Highway 403, is a 400-series highway in the Canadian province of Ontario that travels between Woodstock and Mississauga, west of Toronto, branching off from and reuniting with Highway 401 at both ends and travelling south of it through Hamilton (where it is also known as the Chedoke Expressway) and Mississauga. It runs concurrently with the Queen Elizabeth Way (QEW) for 22 kilometres (14 miles) from Burlington to Oakville. The "Highway 403" designation was first applied in 1963 to a short stub of freeway branching off the QEW at Burlington, and the entire route was completed on August 15, 1997, when the section from Brantford to the then-still independent Town of Ancaster was opened to traffic. The portion of Highway 403 between Woodstock and Burlington was formally dedicated as the Alexander Graham Bell Parkway on April 27, 2016, in honour of Alexander Graham Bell.

Highway 403 begins by diverging from Highway 401 near Woodstock. The majority of Highway 403 is surrounded by suburban land use, except west of Hamilton, where it passes through agricultural land; Brantford is the only urban area through this section. In Hamilton, Highway 403 descends the Niagara Escarpment, then wraps around the northern side of Hamilton Harbour to encounter the QEW at the Freeman Interchange. From there, co-signed with the QEW, it travels straight through Burlington and Oakville; at the Ford Motor Assembly Plant, Highway 403 departs from the QEW to the north at the Mississauga–Oakville boundary. The freeway then crosses through the centre of Mississauga in an east–west direction while travelling alongside a hydro corridor, serving its city centre. Turning north, Highway 403 splits up into a collector-express system; while the express lanes defaulting to Highway 401 east of that interchange, the collector lanes thereafter continue north as Highway 410 to Brampton.

The speed limit is 110 km/h (68 mph) throughout the majority of its length, with the exceptions being between Oak Park Road and Garden Avenue in Brantford, between Alberton Road and Aberdeen Avenue in Hamilton, and between Highway 6 and the Freeman Interchange in Burlington, where the speed limit is 100 km/h (62 mph), and between Aberdeen Avenue and Highway 6, where the speed limit is 90 km/h (56 mph). The route is patrolled by the Ontario Provincial Police (OPP) and maintained by the Ministry of Transportation of Ontario (MTO).

== Route description ==
=== Woodstock to Burlington ===
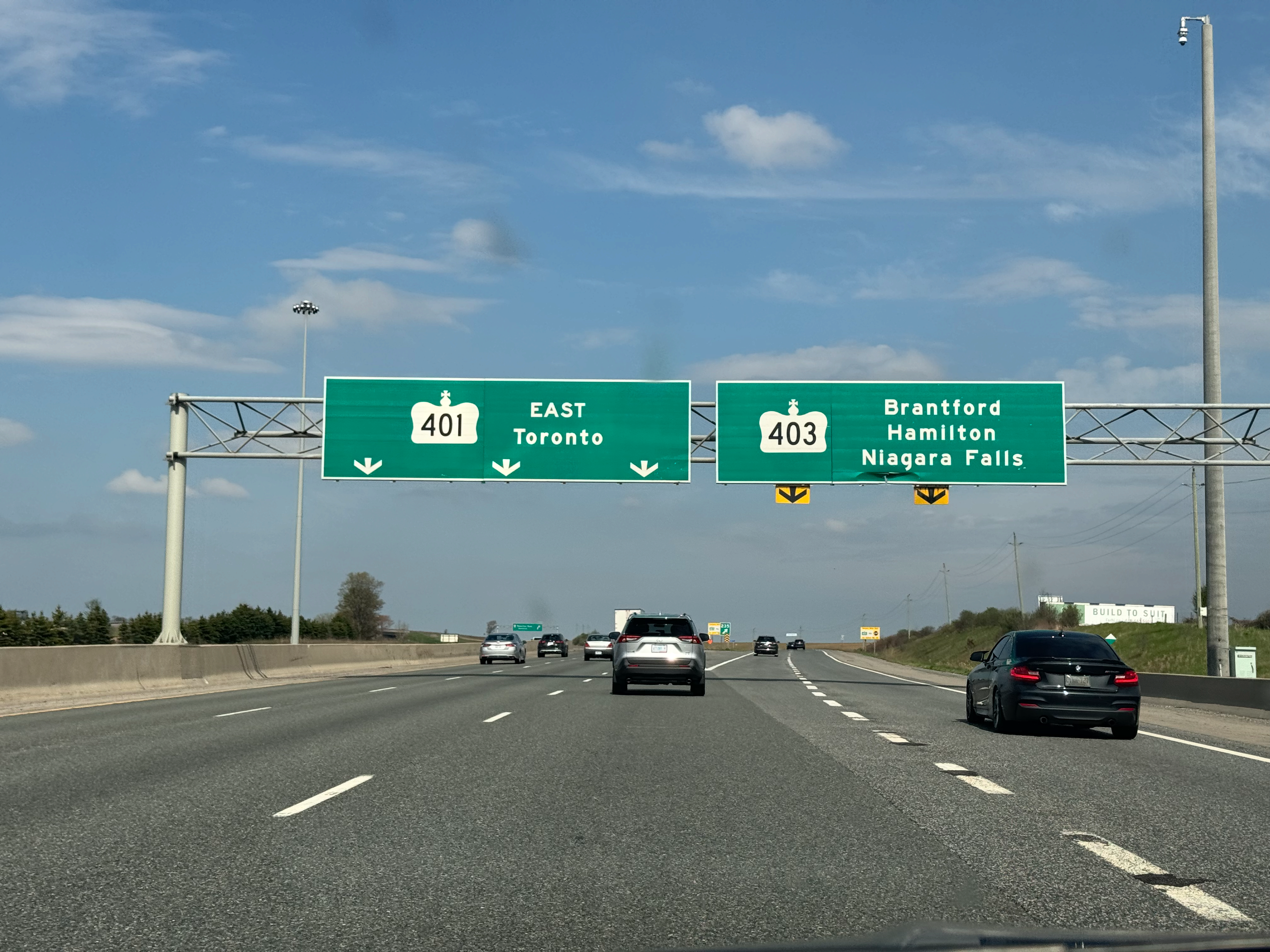
Western terminus of Highway 403 at Highway 401 near Woodstock.

Highway 403 begins at a half-Y-junction with Highway 401 on the outskirts of Woodstock. The eastbound lanes split from eastbound Highway 401, whereas the westbound lanes merge into westbound Highway 401. It travels along the back lot lines of the second concession south of former Highway 2. This first section of the highway is also the least travelled portion, with approximately 20,900 vehicles using it on an average day in 2016. The highway passes beneath Oxford County Road 55 (formerly Highway 53) and curves southeast. After crossing into the third concession, it curves back to the east. The highway travels straight for several kilometres, meeting with the southern leg of Highway 24, which travels south to Simcoe.

The highway crosses the Grand River to the south of Paris, then passes over former Highway 2 as it enters Brantford. As it passes through Brantford, the highway angles southeast and passes beneath the northern leg of Highway 24 and then the Wayne Gretzky Parkway. At Garden Avenue, the highway exits the eastern city limits and curves northeast shortly thereafter. It travels between Jerseyville Road and former Highway 2 to Ancaster, jogging to avoid cutting through Dunmark Lake. As the freeway enters Ancaster, it once again crosses former Highway 2 and dips through the southern side of the town.

Highway 403 and former Highway 2/Highway 53 south of Jerseyville.

East of Ancaster, the freeway passes through a short greenbelt, with Hamilton Golf and Country Club lying to the north. A divided segment of Highway 6 meets the freeway and continues concurrently with it through Hamilton; to the south, Highway 6 travels to Hamilton International Airport, Caledonia, and Jarvis at Highway 3. Continuing east, Highway 403 and Highway 6 curve north into Hamilton and meet the Lincoln M. Alexander Parkway before abruptly turning to the east and descending the Niagara Escarpment. Scenic views of Hamilton, its harbour, port and Lower Princess Falls are along this steep descent. At the bottom of the escarpment, the highway travels through a narrow, heavily developed corridor alongside former Highway 8. It passes beneath multiple bridges in a depressed trench, eventually curving north at a sharp corner and passing beneath more bridges. The highway returns to ground level alongside the Chedoke Creek, a now-channelized river from which the freeway may take its name.

As the freeways continue north, they cross an isthmus between Hamilton Harbour and Cootes Paradise alongside several roads which it has served to replace. They circle around the northern shore of Hamilton Harbour and return to a northeast–southwest orientation. The concurrency with Highway 6 ends at an interchange where Highway 403 continues east and Highway 6 departs north towards Guelph. At this interchange, Highway 403 enters the Greater Toronto Area (Halton Region). After entering the GTA, the freeway continues straight for several kilometres, passing by the Burlington Transmission Station until it approaches the Freeman Interchange where the opposing carriageways split apart to accommodate the left-hand exit/entry of the flyover ramps marking the western terminus of Highway 407, then it merges with Queen Elizabeth Way.

=== Burlington to Mississauga ===
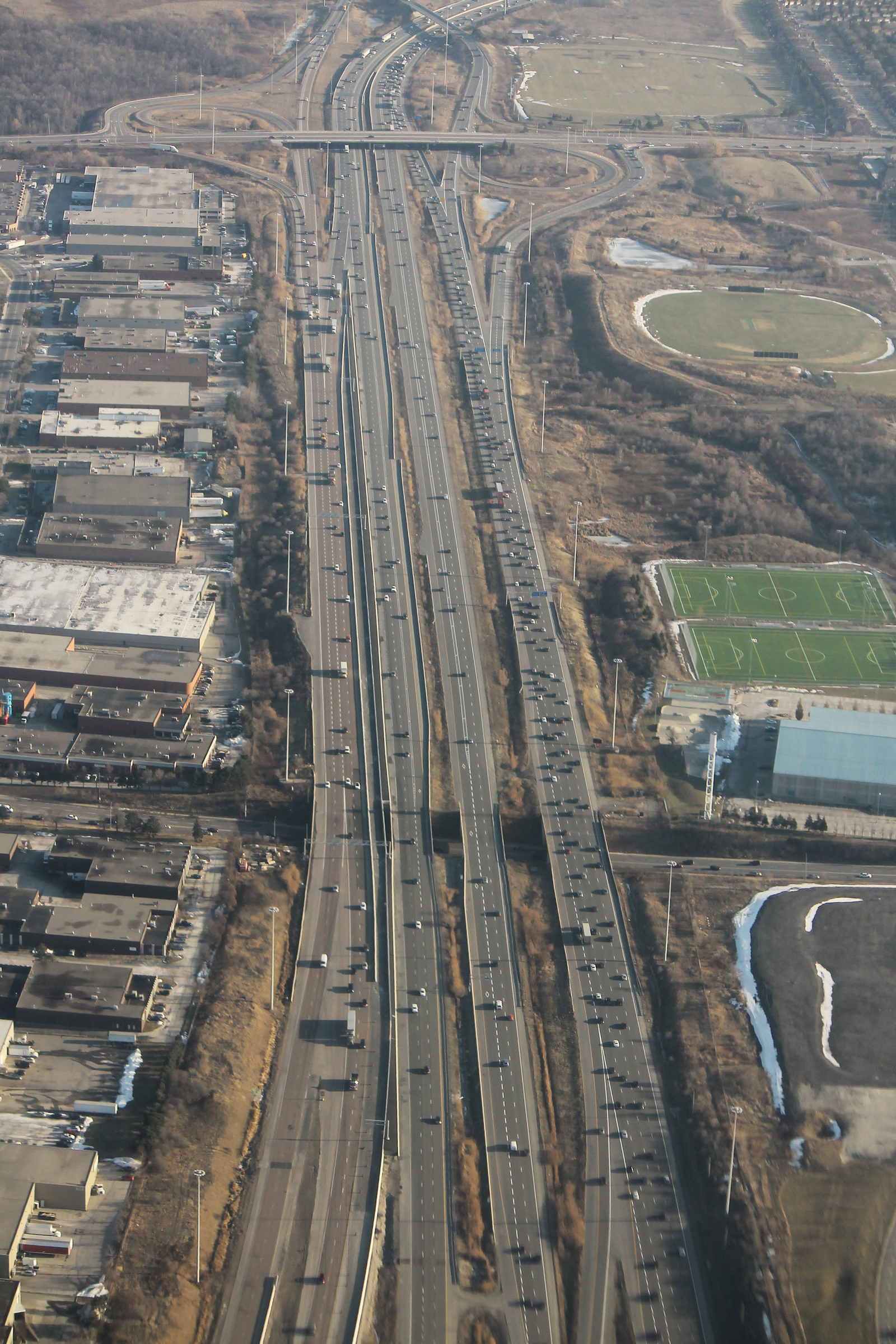
Highway 403's collector-express system, just south of the interchange with Highways 401 and 410 in Mississauga.

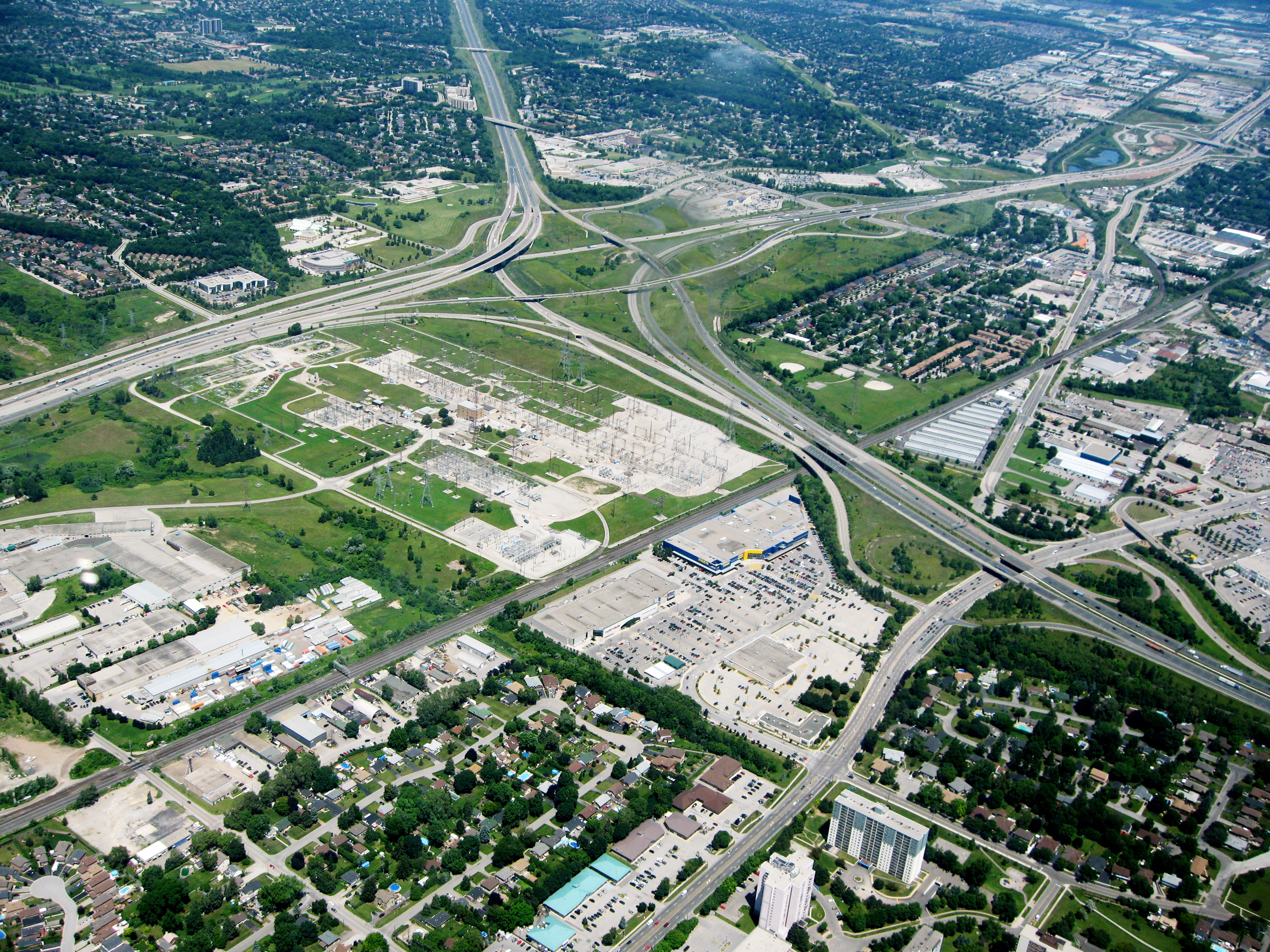
Highway 403 and the QEW converge at the Freeman Interchange in Burlington. Highway 407 ETR also begins at this junction.

Highway 403 travels concurrently with the QEW for 22.6 kilometres (14.0 mi) between the Freeman Interchange and Oakville, a straight section surrounded almost entirely by commercial units and warehouses. At the Ford Assembly Plant near the Halton–Peel regional boundary (and the Oakville–Mississauga city limits), Highway 403 branches off from the QEW as it crosses Ford Drive (Halton Regional Road 13), with the eastbound lanes diving under the QEW and Upper Middle Road, before reuniting with the westbound carriageway. Highway 403 continues northwest, while the QEW continues east to Toronto. After running north–south for five kilometres (3.1 mi) along the western edge of Mississauga, Highway 403 meets with Highway 407 again at a combination interchange where the two freeways curve ninety degrees to avoid crossing each other. Approaching this junction Highway 403 westbound traffic defaults onto Highway 407, so motorists have to continue on Highway 403 via a semi-directional flyover that arcs from the west to the south. This north–south segment of Highway 403 was originally planned as a temporary routing to be bypassed by a new direct Oakville-Burlington link; but in 1995 this routing became permanently part of Highway 403 when the proposed link instead became part of Highway 407.

Highway 407 continues to the north and west to Highway 401, while Highway 403 turns east to follow alongside a hydro corridor through the centre of Mississauga. A portion of the Mississauga Transitway express bus service utilizes the freeway's right shoulders between Erin Mills Parkway (Peel Regional Road 1) and Mavis Road (Peel Regional Road 18). Between Highway 407 and Highway 401, high-occupancy vehicle (HOV) lanes are present in the left shoulder lanes for vehicles with at least one passenger. Sandwiched between residential subdivisions on both sides, the freeway soon thereafter crosses the Credit River. On the other side of the river, between the interchanges with Mavis Road and Hurontario Street (formerly Highway 10), Highway 403 skirts to the north of downtown Mississauga, as well as the Square One Shopping Centre.

After a split with Eastgate Parkway where exiting drivers can access Eglinton Avenue (or Cawthra Road) at a signalized intersection, Highway 403 diverges from a hydro corridor as it abruptly curves to the north. As the curve straightens and approaches the Parlo interchange with Eglinton Avenue, Cawthra Road's northbound lane converges with the onramps from Eglinton to form the eastbound collector lanes, soon joined by the eastbound express-to-collector transfer that also marks the start of another HOV lane. For the westbound collector-express system of Highway 403, after an offramp to Eglinton Avenue, there is collector-to-express transfer; thereafter, the collector lanes (including the onramps from Eglinton) split off and continues south as Cawthra Road, with a signalized intersection for Eastgate Parkway or Highway 403 westbound. The portion of Highway 403 between Hurontario Street and Eglinton Avenue is the busiest along the route, with approximately 180,000 vehicles travelling it on an average day in 2016.

After crossing Matheson Boulevard, the freeway's central HOV lanes terminate and merge with the express lanes. The freeway then approaches a massive, sprawling interchange; while the express lanes curving east and defaulting to Highway 401 express lanes east of that junction, the collector lanes (including its HOV lane) pass under several sets of flyovers and thereafter continue north as Highway 410 to Brampton. The freeway's collector lanes also have connecting ramps to both directions of the Highway 401 collector lanes.

== History ==
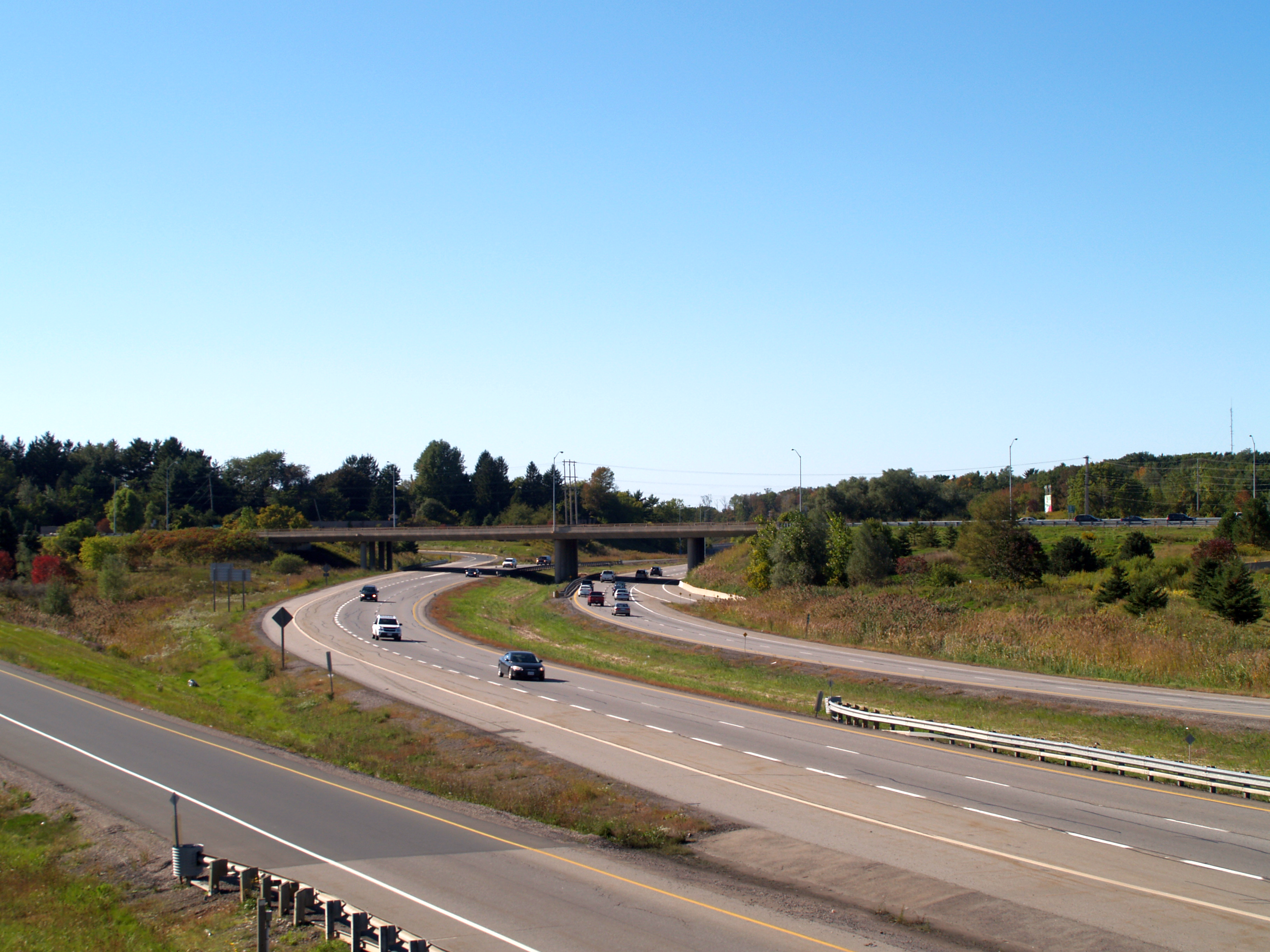
Highway 403 at the Wilson Street (former Highway 2) interchange in Ancaster. Wilson Street was the western terminus of the Chedoke Expressway from 1969 to 1997.

Though one of the first divided highways conceived for Ontario, Highway 403 is one of the most recently completed freeways in the province; the multiple segments of the route did not become continuous until 2002. Planning for the route was underway by 1958, as a portion of QEW was realigned from its original alignment of Middle Road to the Freeman Diversion which also included three-legged junction for the future Highway 403. Sections of Highway 403 through Hamilton opened between December 1963 and September 1969, with that stretch known as the Chedoke Expressway. An isolated section known as the Brantford Bypass was opened in October 1966, and would remain unconnected to other freeways for over 20 years; the Brantford Bypass also included a non-freeway four-lane undivided road (also known as Garden Avenue) which was provincially-maintained until 1997. Plans for a third segment through Mississauga (originally known as the Hamilton Expressway) were contemplated throughout the 1960s, but were not finalized until late 1977, after which construction began. Portions opened at both ends in 1980 and 1981, while the central gap, crossing the Credit River, was completed in December 1982.

Construction to bridge the gaps in Highway 403 between Ancaster and Woodstock was carried out over three major phases. The first phase was a short extension of the Brantford Bypass beginning in 1975, however motorists would have to continue on Highway 2/Highway 53 to reach Highway 401. Later, work began to connect that extension with Highway 401 near Woodstock, which opened in 1988. The non-freeway section of the Brantford Bypass (Garden Avenue) and Colborne Street/Wilson Street (Highway 2/53) served as the connector between the Woodstock-Brantford and Ancaster-Hamilton segments of Highway 403, until the last phase of Highway 403 between Ancaster and Brantford finally opened in 1997. The final discontinuity, between Burlington and Oakville, was signed as a concurrency with the QEW in 2002. Originally, Highway 403 was to be extended westward from Oakville to connect directly with the Burlington-Brantford segment, bypassing the north–south routing of Highway 403 along the Mississauga-Oakville boundary that would then be re-designated as part of the proposed Highway 407. Budget shortfalls in 1995 resulted in a change of plans, so Highway 403 retained the existing north–south segment in Oakville, while the vacant corridor previously intended for Highway 403 from Oakville to Burlington has since been occupied by the westmost extension of Highway 407 ETR that opened in 2001.

The stretch of Highway 403 between Woodstock and Burlington, whose separate segments were previously known as the Brantford Bypass and Chedoke Expressway, was formally dedicated as the "Alexander Graham Bell Parkway" on April 27, 2016, in honour of Alexander Graham Bell. Some sources like Google Maps have erroneously referred to the entirety of Highway 403 as the Chedoke Expressway.

=== Predecessors ===
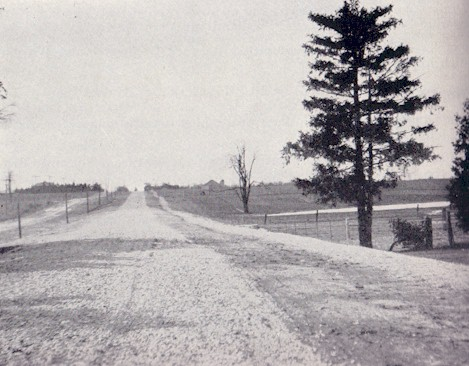
Highway 2 near Woodstock was widened into a divided four lane highway by 1936 and is one of the precursors to Highway 403.

The corridor that connects London and Hamilton has always been considered important to Ontario. In late October 1793, Captain Smith and 100 Queen's Rangers returned from carving The Governor's Road (Dundas Street) 32 kilometres (20 mi) through the thick forests between Dundas and the present location of Paris. John Graves Simcoe was tasked with defending Upper Canada from the United States following the American Revolution and with opening the virgin territory to settlement. After establishing a "temporary" capital at York, Simcoe ordered an inland route constructed between Cootes Paradise at the tip of Lake Ontario and his proposed capital of London. By the spring of 1794, the road was extended as far as La Tranche, now the Thames River. Today, most of this route forms part of former Highway 2 and former Highway 5.

The paving of the divided four-lane Middle Road, with gentle curves, a grass median, and grade-separated interchanges, would set the stage for the freeway concept. It was the first intercity freeway in North America when it opened in June 1939. Thomas McQuesten, the new minister of the Department of Highways and the man most responsible for the Middle Road, decided to apply the concept to sections of Highway 2 plagued with congestion. A portion east of Woodstock was rebuilt in this fashion, but World War II would put an end to McQuesten's ambitions, at least temporarily.

=== Initial construction ===
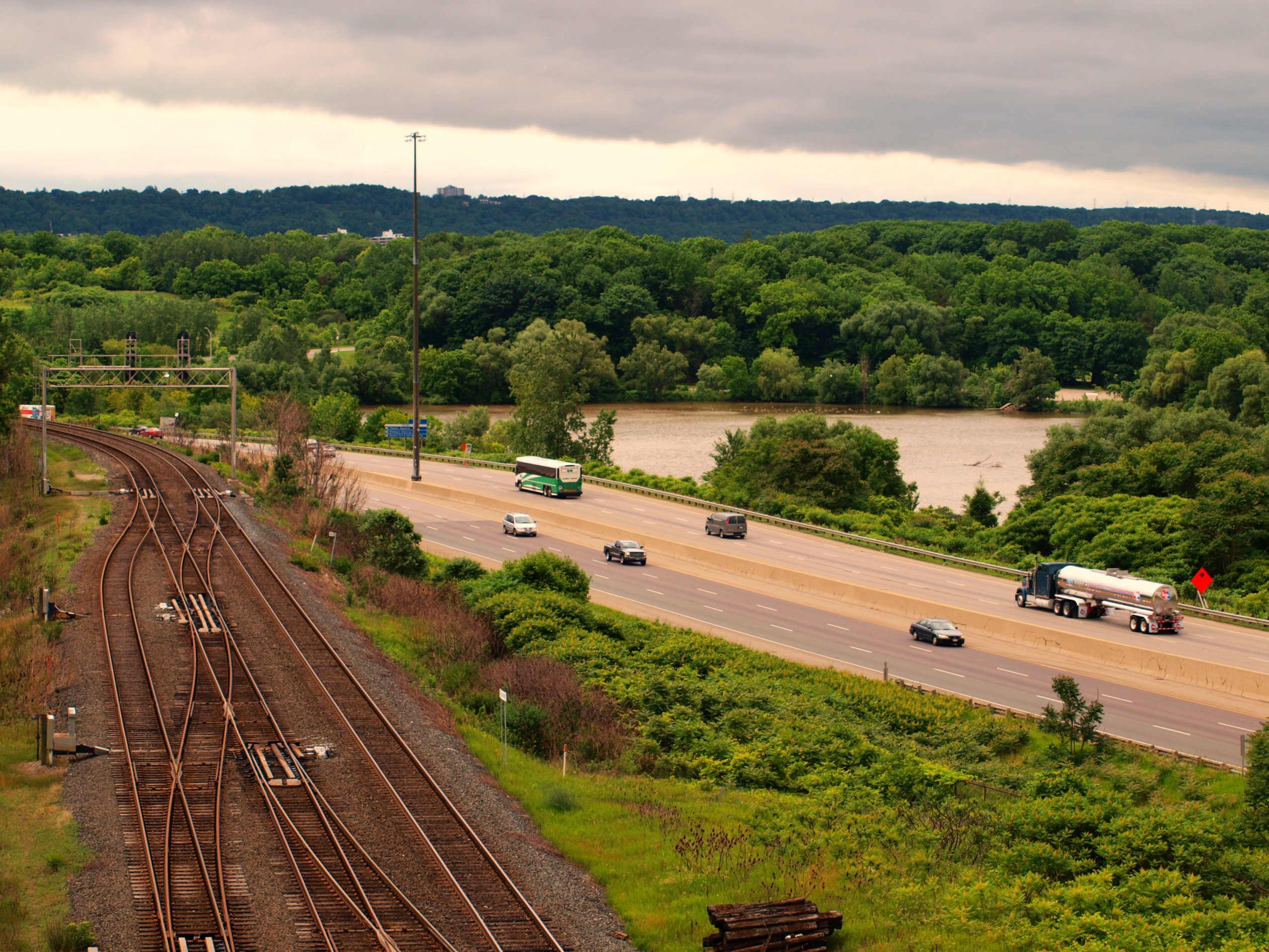
Highway 403 in Hamilton at the bottom of the Niagara Escarpment

The end of the Korean War in 1953 heralded the resumption of freeway construction in Ontario; the advances in machinery more than made up for lost time. The construction of Highway 401 across the province took first priority. However, the opening of the section of Highway 401 from Highway 4 near London to Highway 2 east of Woodstock on May 31, 1957 would complete part of the route required between London and Hamilton.

By 1958, planning on the Chedoke Expressway, or Controlled Access Highway 403, was well underway, though plans for a four-lane freeway between Woodstock and Hamilton existed as early as 1954. The opening of the Freeman Diversion alignment of the QEW in August 1958 provided a connection point for the future Chedoke Expressway, and construction began the same day that the Burlington Bay James N. Allan Skyway opened: October 31, 1958. Highway 403 between Longwood Road (Highway 2) and the QEW was opened to traffic on December 1, 1963 at a length of 9.0 km (5.6 mi). Work was already underway on the next section of the route that would extend it to Aberdeen Avenue. That section opened on July 9, 1965, extending the freeway by 3.7 km (2.3 mi).

Meanwhile, to the west, work had begun on a bypass of Brantford. The new freeway passed north of the city between Paris Road in the west and the junction of Highway 2 and Highway 53 in the east, a distance of 10.3 kilometres (6.4 mi); it opened October 31, 1966. However, the Brantford Bypass would remain an isolated section of Highway 403 for over 20 years. When the final section of Highway 403 was completed in 1997, a portion of the Brantford Bypass (the four-lane undivided segment also known as Garden Avenue, although never part of Highway 403) was itself bypassed and downloaded to local authorities.

In Hamilton, work was underway on an extension of the Chedoke Expressway to Mohawk Road, crossing the Niagara Escarpment. This tedious project, which required extensive rock blasting, was soon accompanied by construction from Mohawk Road to Highway 2 near Ancaster. Both projects were completed together and originally scheduled to be opened with a ribbon-cutting ceremony on August 22, 1969. However, local residents complained the new section lacked any barriers preventing children from wandering onto the highway, postponing the ceremony until August 27 as temporary snow fencing was erected. This proved inadequate, and protests grew more vocal over the following week. Several petitions were presented to Deputy Highway Minister H. Howden on August 26, and the ceremonies were cancelled. Over the following week, Minister of Highways George Gomme met with residents and reached a compromise whereby a 24-hour patrol was established to watch for children until a proper fence could be constructed. The route was opened on September 3, without any ceremony. This completed the Hamilton section of Highway 403. As completed, the western terminus of the Chedoke Expressway defaulted to Wilson Street (Highway 2) via a trumpet interchange near Ancaster, although the Wilson Street overpass was designed to accommodate a future extension of the Chedoke Expressway.

=== Mississauga ===
Highway 403 and QEW interchange in Oakville prior to reconstruction that commenced in 2016; the Ford Motor Assembly Plant is visible in the distance

Planning for the segment of Highway 403 through Mississauga dates to the late 1950s when the Hamilton Expressway appeared on the Metropolitan Toronto's regional transportation plan. It was to be a continuation of the Richview Expressway, which was ultimately never built, continuing from Toronto to Hamilton. The plan featured the expressway's eastern terminus at the Highway 401 and Highway 427 interchange. As Toronto's anti-expressway movement gained momentum, provincial plans shifted the Hamilton Expressway to the west near Etobicoke Creek. In 1962, the right-of-way alongside the hydro corridor between Burlington and Etobicoke Creek was protected after traffic studies indicated the need for a future freeway. On May 25, 1965, the Department of Highways unveiled the Toronto Region Western Section Highway Planning Study. The plan designated Highway 403 north from Burlington and then parallel with the QEW to Highway 401 near Highway 27.

By the time construction was actually underway, plans had been completely modified to connect the overburdened QEW at Oakville with Highway 401 at the new Highway 410 interchange. This interchange was a better connection point for Highway 403, but would also require the widening of Highway 401 from six lanes to twelve. Plans were submitted and approved in December 1977 by Mississauga city council, and construction began. Highway 410 was opened on November 15, 1978 as a two-lane expressway which did not yet connect to Highway 403 nor Highway 401 west of that interchange.

The Mississauga portion of Highway 403 opened in sections during the early 1980s. The first section between Cawthra Road and Highway 401 was opened August 18, 1980. This was followed by a short section from Highway 5 (Dundas Street) south to the QEW at Ford Drive, which opened in mid-1981, with a further extension to Erin Mills Parkway opening on November 17th of that year. The final section to be opened took the longest to complete, involving construction of two bridges over the Credit River valley; it opened on December 2, 1982. The cost of the entire 22-kilometre (14 mi) Mississauga segment was $87 million. As opened the Mississauga segment was six lanes wide between Cawthra Road and Winston Churchill Boulevard, and thereafter four lanes wide to the QEW in Oakville, with a grass median and overhead signage but no illumination except at interchanges. The existing QEW between Burlington and Oakville serves as the freeway link between the Mississauga and Chedoke Expressway segments of Highway 403.

Around the same period, the Ministry of Transportation began to study upgrading Highway 401 to a collector–express system between Renforth Drive and Highway 403, and along Highway 403 between Highway 401 and Highway 10 (Hurontario Street). This took place between late 1982 and the summer of 1985; the existing outermost ramps from Highway 403 to Highway 401 eastbound (completed in 1977) were re-designated to serve collector traffic, as a pair of flyover ramps were added inside the interchange to serve motorists in the express lanes. After these inner flyover ramps were completed, then the outermost ramp from Highway 401 westbound collector to Highway 403 westbound collector was temporarily closed from 1984-85 so a new flyover could be inserted to cross the future Highway 401 express lanes. Between Cawthra Road and Highway 401, Highway 403's original four inner lanes were designated as express lanes, while four-lane carriageways for the collectors were built upon either side, resulting in a collector-express system with a twelve-lane cross section which also included illumination.

The right-of-way originally intended for Highway 403 between Cawthra Road and Etobicoke Creek was eventually used for a controlled-access arterial extension called Eastgate Parkway, which was planned beginning in 1982. The extension was built between 1988 and 1994, incorporating a portion of Fieldgate Drive at the eastern end. The first section, between Cawthra Road and Dixie Road, opened in early 1991. This was followed several years later by the section from Dixie Road to Eglinton Avenue that opened in late 1994.

In 1990, construction was underway on the planned but not-yet-built parts of the Highway 401-403-410 interchange, alongside the widening of Highway 410 into a full freeway, and the further expansion of Highway 401's collector-express system. At the time traffic from both freeways was forced onto eastbound Highway 401. Two semi-directional flyover ramps were built, for the Highway 401 eastbound to Highway 410 northbound movement, and the Highway 410 southbound to Highway 401 eastbound movement, the latter which replaced an existing loop ramp. The removal of that loop ramp, as well as completion of the new flyovers in the interchange, would free up space for connections between Highway 403 and Highway 410 whose construction started in December 1991. The 2.2-kilometre (1.4 mi) link opened on November 2, 1992 at a cost of $7.3 million.

==== Controversy ====
Though some officials considered Highway 403 to be a perfect example of a freeway construction process, it was not built without its share of controversy. Portions of the freeway through Mississauga were built alongside established communities, leading to angry homeowners' associations pressuring the province for noise mitigation measures and compensation.

In the late 1980s and early 1990s, the Mississauga section of Highway 403 was the site of more than two dozen fatal accidents over a five-year period, one of the highest rates in North America at the time, despite being up to modern road standards. This led Peel Regional Police and the media to nickname it the "Death Highway." In particular, the stretch from Mavis Road to Erin Mills Parkway has been the site of numerous accidents. In this section, Highway 403 features a downward slope as motorists head eastbound towards the Mavis Road interchange; drivers complain of having to slam on the brakes when traffic comes to a standstill, leading to rear-end collisions. There is also glare from the sun that causes vision problems throughout the day.

=== Connecting Brantford Bypass to Woodstock and Ancaster ===
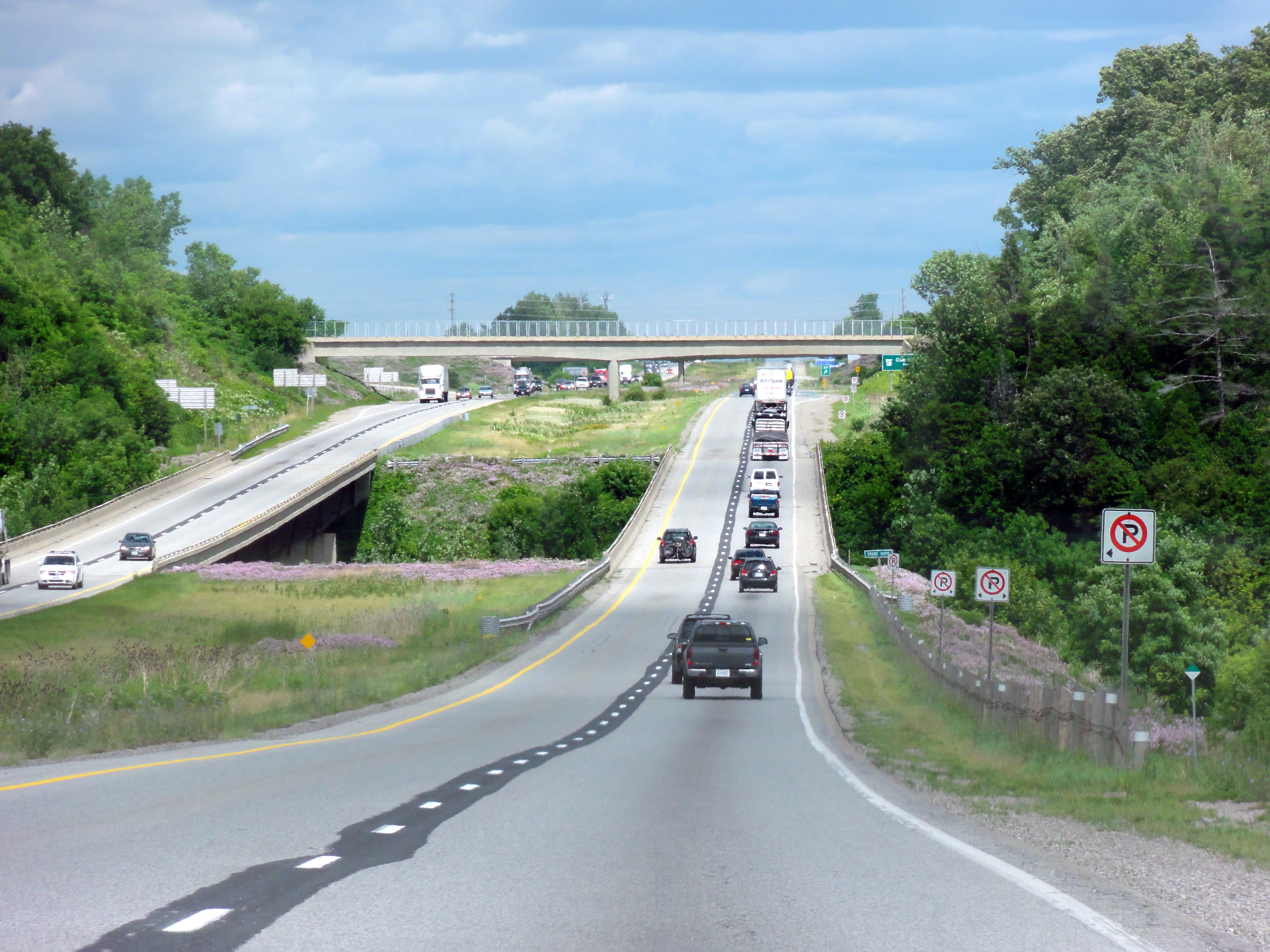
Highway 403 eastbound at the Grand River bridge near Brantford. The stretch between Woodstock and Hamilton was rehabilitated in 2011, which included installing central guardrails and paved shoulders.

In 1975, construction began on a westward extension of the Brantford Bypass, from Highway 2 (Paris Road) to Rest Acres Road, which would become Highway 24. This work consisted of the twin bridges over the Grand River and an interchange at Rest Acres Road. The Canadian National Railway underpass west of Highway 2 was built by the railway. By the beginning of 1978, this work was completed. Work resumed west of Highway 24 in early 1982 to connect with Highway 401 near Woodstock to relieve the high traffic volumes along Highway 2. This included interchanges at Brant County Road 25 and Highway 53. A section from Highway 24 to County Road 25 was opened in November 1984, followed by the section west of there to Highway 53 one year later. Construction of the gap between Highway 53 and Highway 401 began in late 1985, followed by the overpass crossing Highway 401 for the westbound lanes, which began in 1987 with the westbound carriageway of Highway 401 temporarily diverted to speed up construction of the cast-in-place post-tensioned flyover. Transportation minister Ed Fulton ceremoniously opened the new freeway connection on September 26, 1988, completing the Woodstock to Brantford link.

Highway 403 still had one remaining discontinuity, between Brantford and Ancaster where traffic was defaulted onto Garden Avenue (an original part of the Brantford Bypass, although never part of Highway 403) and Colborne Street/Wilson Street (Highway 2 and Highway 53). Both of these were four-lane undivided roads, plus Colborne Street/Wilson Street had numerous private driveways and at-grade intersections. On March 24, 1987, Chris Ward, MPP for Wentworth North announced that construction of the missing link between Brantford and Ancaster would begin in 1989. Construction began in mid-1990, with Parclo A4 interchanges built at Garden Avenue and Highway 52, while the existing Wilson Street overpass was retained but the trumpet interchange was reconfigured to a Parclo A4 in 1996-97. A continuous construction program was carried out over the next seven years, with the link opening on August 15, 1997. With the completion of Highway 403, Highway 2 and Highway 53 were subsequently downloaded to the local municipalities, as was Garden Avenue.

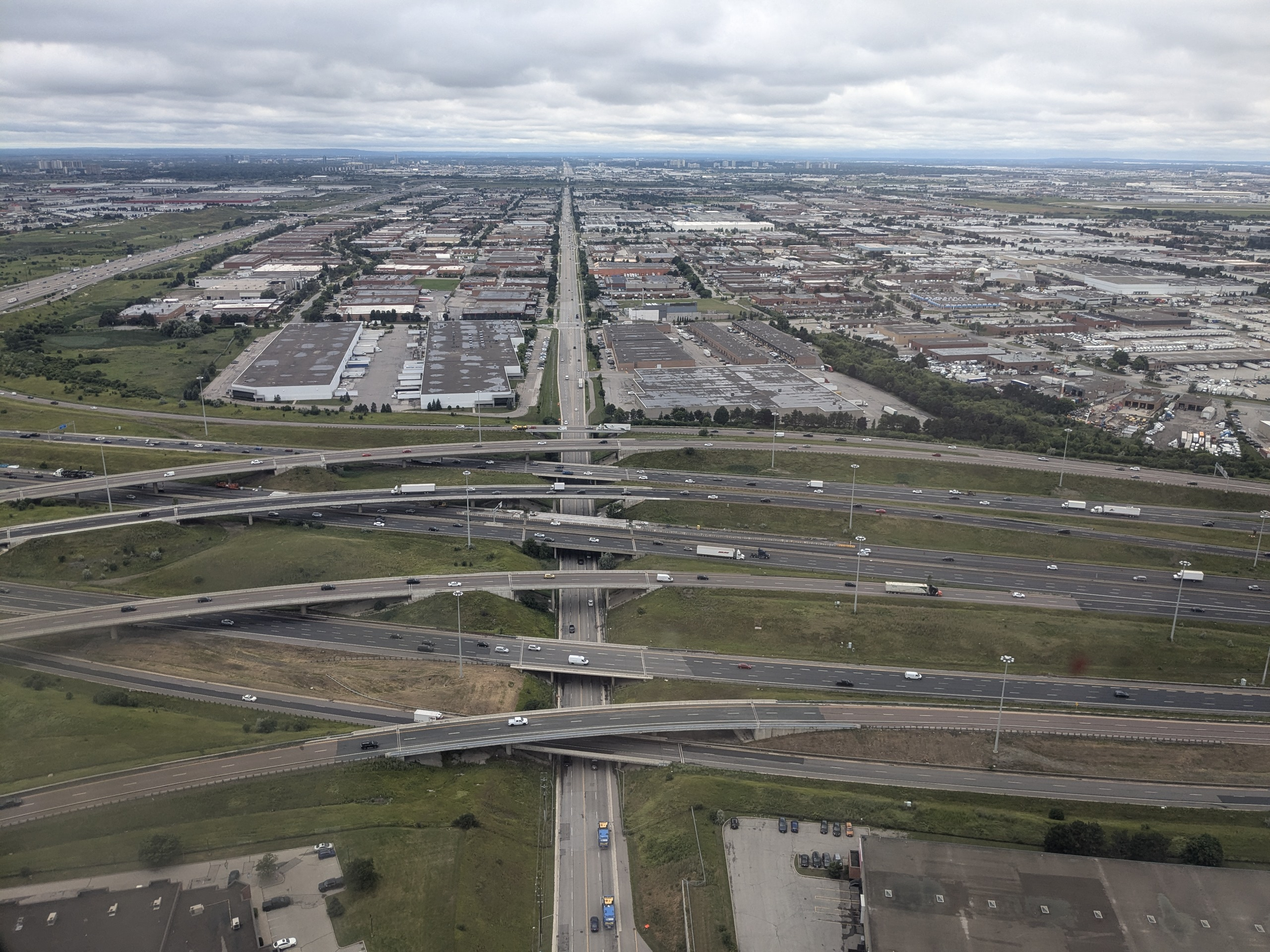
The eastern terminus of Highway 403 in Mississauga, feeding into the collector and express lanes of Highway 401.

=== Recent construction ===
With the expanded capacity of the Burlington Skyway, and the unanticipated traffic volumes on Highway 403, the Freeman Interchange was now faced with a capacity problem. To resolve this, the renamed Ministry of Transportation began planning for the missing link of Highway 403 between Burlington and Mississauga that would run parallel to the QEW; this right-of-way would be sold to the 407 ETR consortium in 1995 and built as part of that route. Work began in August 1991 to reconfigure the directional T interchange to modern standards which included realigning the QEW carriageways as mainline traffic, and adding a fourth leg for the future Burlington-Mississauga link. The Toronto-bound QEW to the Brantford-bound Highway 403 movement, which had been handled by a directional ramp in the old interchange, was replaced with a lower-capacity loop ramp as a cost-saving measure (as some traffic was expected to be diverted away from the Burlington Skyway to the under-construction Lincoln M. Alexander Parkway and planned Red Creek Expressway, both of which were eventually completed). The reconfigured Freeman Interchange was partially opened on October 23, 1993 to serve the existing QEW and Highway 403 segments; the first sod for what would open as Highway 407 was turned that day. The completed ramps (the first to be built were cast-in-place post-tensioned bridges to cross Highway 403 westbound, followed in 2000 by precast girder bridges to pass over the North Service Road) connecting to the future Burlington-Mississauga freeway sat unused until that segment finally opened on July 30, 2001, as part of Highway 407 ETR.

The Hamilton-Brantford and Mississauga sections of Highway 403 were eventually planned to be linked up via an east–west extension that would run parallel to the QEW, as the current north–south routing of Highway 403 along the Mississauga-Oakville boundary to end at the QEW was intended to be temporary and eventually assumed by the proposed Highway 407. When originally opened in 1981, the Highway 403 westbound carriageway initially followed a ninety degree turn from west to south near Ninth Line, however in 1989 this was replaced by the first phase of a cloverstack interchange between Highway 403 and Highway 407, while the Highway 403 westbound carriageway was shifted to a semi-directional flyover. The northern leg (to Highway 401 just west of Mississauga) and western leg of that junction would be completed later; the partially-completed interchange included a temporary east–west connector (known internally by MTO as Highway 7197) to Trafalgar Road (Halton Regional Road 3). However, the Bob Rae government altered these plans in 1995 due to budgetary constraints. It was also announced the Mississauga section of Highway 403 would be renumbered as Highway 410, although this was not done. Instead, Highway 403 was signed concurrently along the Queen Elizabeth Way in 2002, remedying the discontinuity. On September 4, 1998, Highway 407 opened between Highway 401 and Highway 403. By the middle of 2001 access was added to the Burlington–Oakville segment of Highway 407, previously intended to be part of Highway 403, which incorporated the existing Highway 7197 which was redesignated as the ramp from Highway 407 eastbound to Highway 403 eastbound.

The Highway 401-403-410 interchange looking east in 1987. Before 1990, Highway 403 was not connected with Highway 410, as the latter existed as a super two north of Highway 401, plus the Highway 401 express lanes had not yet been extended to just west of Highway 410.

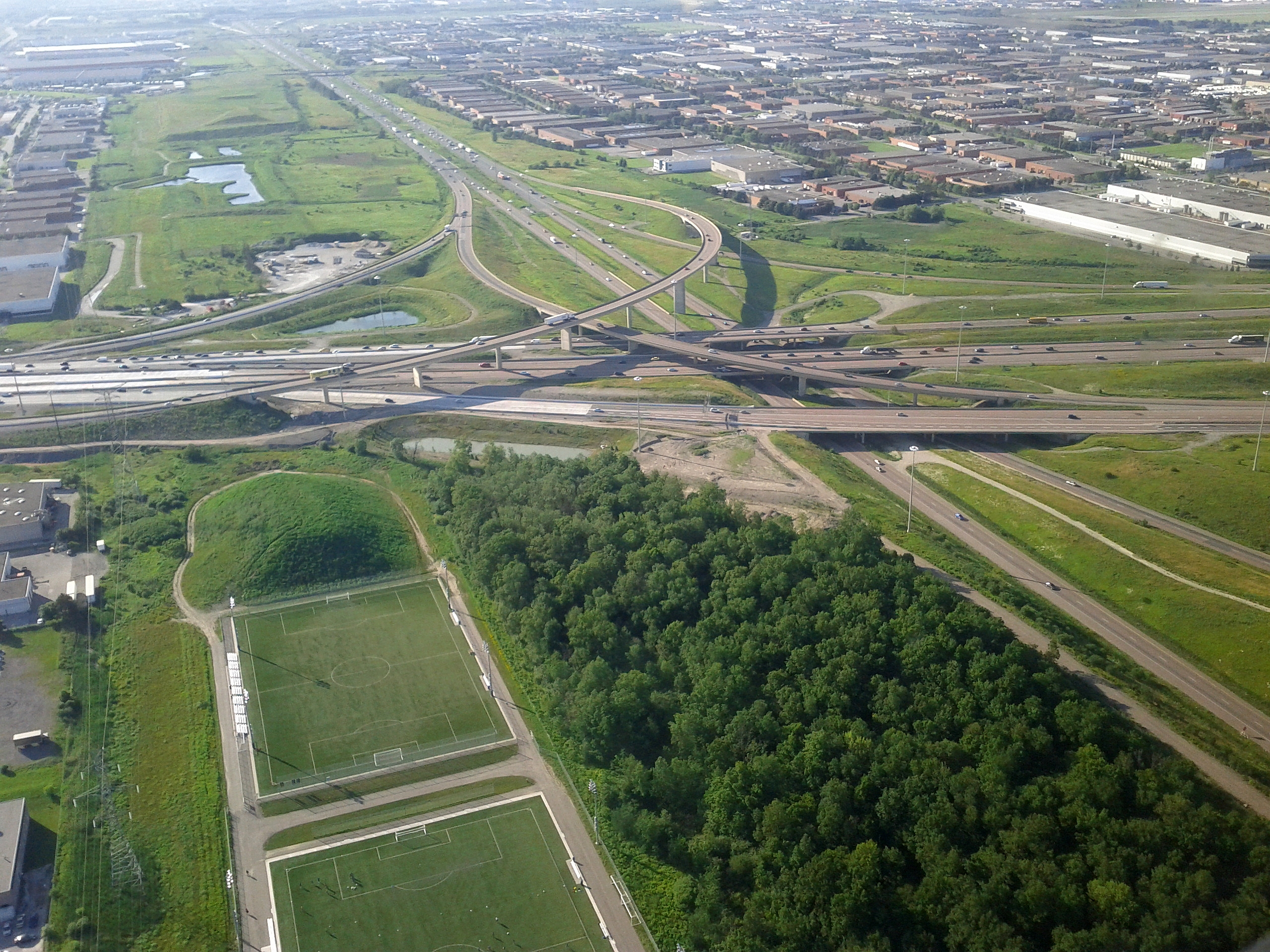
The interchange in 2013, looking north.

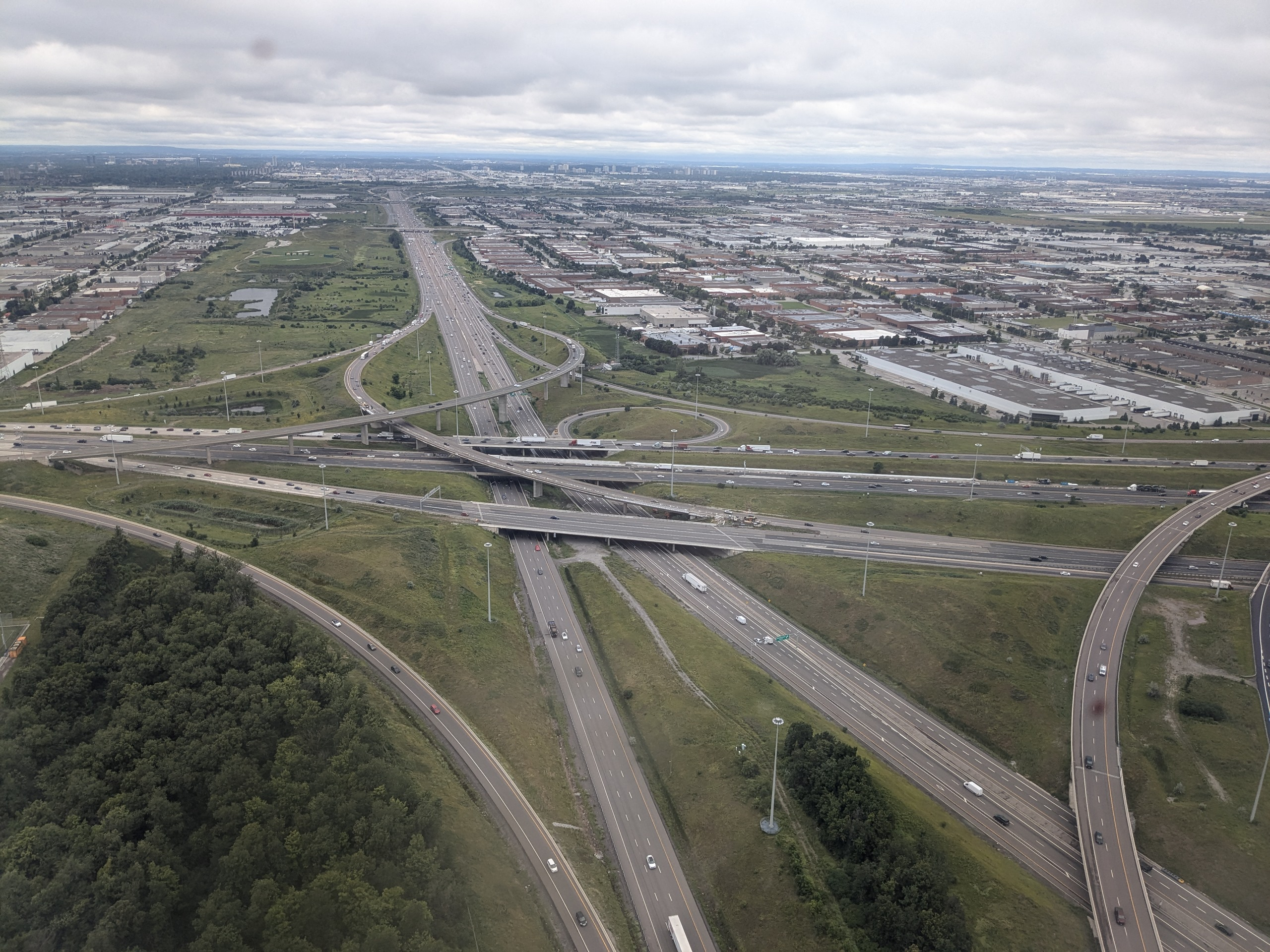
The interchange in 2024, with missing connections completed.

In early 2001, high-mast lighting was added to the unlit Mississauga section between Highway 407 and Eastgate Parkway. The lighting masts were placed between the westbound carriageway and hydro corridor, rather than in the median like most other provincial freeways. In 2003, the right shoulders between Erin Mills Parkway and Mavis Road were widened for GO Transit and Mississauga Transit to run express bus service. These projects preceded the widening of Highway 403 between Highway 407 and Highway 401/410, through which a high-occupancy vehicle (HOV) lane was added in each direction; the project started on September 29, 2003 and was completed and opened on December 13, 2005. The HOV lanes and the dividing Ontario Tall Wall concrete barrier were constructed using the existing right-of-way provided by the grass median, although between Cawthra Road and Highway 401 the barrier was not required since the reduced grass median was still wide enough to divide the express lane carriageways. Metrolinx began construction of the Mississauga Transitway West between Winston Churchill Boulevard and Erin Mills Parkway in October 2013, including realignment of hydro towers and new bus-only lanes crossing the existing ramps on the north side of Highway 403's interchange with Winston Churchill Boulevard, which was completed on December 31, 2016.

Land was reserved at the Highway 401/403/410 junction for a loop ramp from Highway 403 eastbound to Highway 401 westbound, and a directional ramp for the opposite movement, however as a prerequisite Highway 401 first had to be widened west of this interchange; previously Highway 401's collector-express system had terminated. The existing overpasses for the Highway 403 to Highway 410 link have sufficient right-of-way to accommodate the addition of a new HOV lane to the Highway 403 eastbound collectors that would tie into the expanded Highway 410 (itself being widened to include HOV lanes), as well as the approach to the loop ramp to Highway 401 westbound. Construction commenced on these ramps by 2017. The construction was completed in November 2018, making that interchange full access in all directions.

Highway 403 between Woodstock and Burlington was formally dedicated as the Alexander Graham Bell Parkway on April 27, 2016. At the Desjardins Canal in Hamilton, starting in May 2022, the existing bridge for the eastbound lanes was replaced by a new single span pre-stressed NU girder structure bridge, while for the westbound lanes the 3 span 18 steel girder westbound structure was rehabilitated.

Improvements were made to the bottlenecked Highway 403/QEW/Ford Drive interchange in Oakville. Since 2017, traffic using the existing loop ramp in the NE corner to access Highway 403/QEW was directed onto a new overpass instead of sharing the existing overpass with westbound Highway 403 traffic. The existing bridges carrying QEW traffic across Ford Drive and the eastbound ramp to Highway 403 were demolished and replaced by new wider structures which can accommodate future HOV lanes and high-mast lighting. At the present Highway 403 only connects to the QEW west of the interchange, but a new set of flyover ramps are being proposed from Highway 403 to the QEW east of that junction using the existing right-of-way which would allow for a direct freeway connection from Milton to south Mississauga.

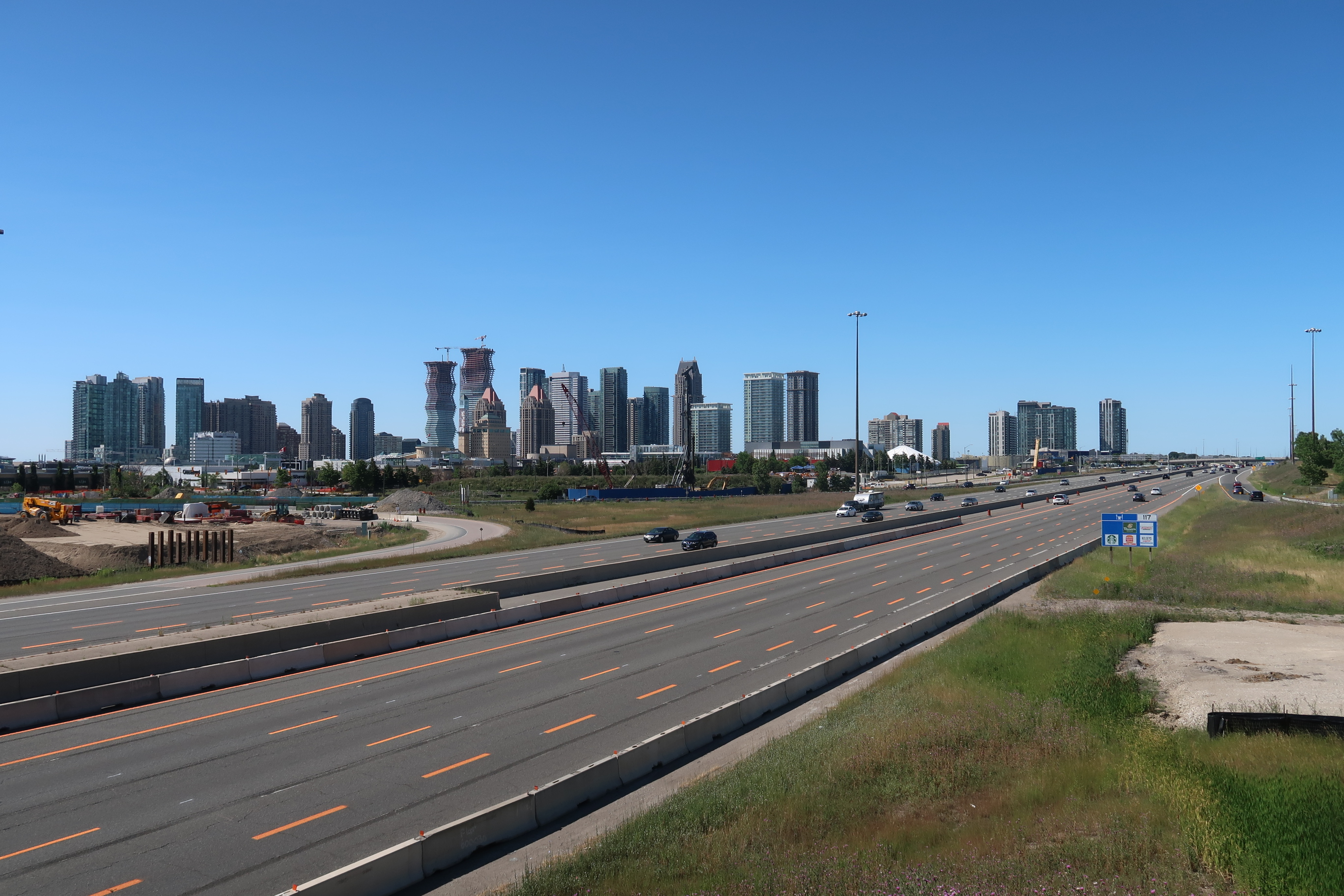
Highway 403 looking west, while passing north of Downtown Mississauga, as seen atop the Hurontario Street overpass. Construction of the flyover for the Hurontario LRT is underway.

The 2017 initial design of the Hurontario LRT line had it occupying the centre median of Hurontario Street including the existing bridge crossing Highway 403. At the southern approach to the bridge, there would be a junction for an LRT branch to the Mississauga City Centre, and the junction would have crossed the southbound traffic lanes of Hurontario Street and a Highway 403 exit ramp at grade. However studies showed that this initial LRT route would seriously impact vehicular traffic at the Highway 403-Hurontario interchange. A revised 2021 route proposes that the LRT cross Highway 403 on its own elevated guideway to the west of Hurontario Street overpass.

There are preliminary proposals for adding HOV lanes to Highway 403 within Burlington, alongside a proposal to modify the Freeman Interchange.

== Exit list ==
The following table lists the major junctions along Highway 403, as noted by the Ministry of Transportation of Ontario.

Division	Location	km	mi	Exit	Destinations	Notes
Oxford	Woodstock	0.0	0.0	—	Highway 401 west – London	Highway 403 western terminus; eastbound entrance from Highway 401 east; westbound exit to Highway 401 west; Highway 401 exit 235
Oxford	Norwich	5.4	3.4	6	County Road 55 – Eastwood, Cathcart	Formerly Highway 53
Brant		15.3	9.5	16	County Road 25 – Burford, Princeton	
Brant		26.7	16.6	27	Highway 24 south / County Highway 24 north (Rest Acres Road) – Simcoe, Paris	Western end of Highway 24 concurrency
Brantford		30.2	18.8	30	County Road 27 (Oak Park Road)	
Brantford		33.1	20.6	33	County Highway 2 (Paris Road)	No access from eastbound Highway 403 to westbound Paris Road or from eastbound Paris Road to westbound Highway 403; formerly Highway 2
Brantford		35.7	22.2	36	Highway 24 north (King George Road) – Cambridge	Eastern end of Highway 24 concurrency; to Brantford General Hospital
Brantford		38.3	23.8	38	Wayne Gretzky Parkway	
Brantford		40.7	25.3	41	Garden Avenue – Cainsville	
Hamilton		55.2	34.3	55	City Road 52 (Trinity Road) – Copetown	
Hamilton		58.5	36.4	58	Wilson Street	Formerly Highway 2
Hamilton		60.3	37.5	60	City Road 16 (Fiddler's Green Road)	Westbound exit and eastbound entrance
Hamilton		61.4	38.2	61	Highway 6 south – Caledonia, Port Dover	Western end of Highway 6 concurrency; to John C. Munro Hamilton International Airport
Hamilton		61.4	38.2	61	Garner Road	Westbound exit and eastbound entrance; formerly Highway 53
Hamilton		64.3	40.0	64	Lincoln M. Alexander Parkway	Nicknamed the "Linc"
Hamilton		64.3	40.0	64	Rousseaux Street	Rousseaux Street is actually a part of Mohawk Road, with Rousseaux Street proper beginning 1.6 km (1 mi) west of the interchange. Signed as such to avoid motorist confusion after Mohawk Road was severed due to construction of the Linc; westbound exit and eastbound entrance.
Hamilton		69.1	42.9	69B	Aberdeen Avenue	Eastbound signed as exit 69
Hamilton		69.1	42.9	69A	City Road 8 west (Main Street)	Westbound exit and eastbound entrance
Hamilton		70.5	43.8	70	City Road 8 east (Main Street)	Formerly Highway 2 / Highway 8; entrance ramps via King Street (City Road 8 west); eastbound access to City Road 8 west via Dundurn Street
Hamilton				Crosses Hamilton Harbour (Desjardins Canal)		
Hamilton		72.8	45.2	73	York Boulevard	Westbound to southbound exit and northbound to eastbound entrance; formerly Highway 2 west / Highway 6 south
Hamilton–Halton boundary	Hamilton–Burlington boundary	74.2	46.1	74	Highway 6 north – Guelph	Eastern end of Highway 6 concurrency
Halton	Burlington	77.5	48.2	78	Waterdown Road	Originally designed only with an eastbound exit and westbound entrance; full interchange opened on November 1, 2010
Halton	Burlington	80.6– 81.7	50.1– 50.8	80	407 ETR east	Tolled; eastbound exit and westbound entrance; Highway 407 exit 1
Halton	Burlington	80.6– 81.7	50.1– 50.8	—	Plains Road, Fairview Street	Eastbound exit and westbound entrance; Toronto-bound exit and Fort Erie-bound entrance from Queen Elizabeth Way; westbound exit and eastbound entrance from 407 ETR
Halton	Burlington	80.6– 81.7	50.1– 50.8	Exit numbers continue to follow Queen Elizabeth Way, exit numbers increase by 20		
Halton	Burlington	80.6– 81.7	50.1– 50.8	100	Queen Elizabeth Way – Niagara, Fort Erie	Western end of Queen Elizabeth Way concurrency; to Joseph Brant Hospital
Halton	Burlington	82.5	51.3	101	Regional Road 18 (Brant Street)	No Toronto-bound exit and Fort Erie-bound entrance from Queen Elizabeth Way
Halton	Burlington	84.4	52.4	102	Regional Road 1 (Guelph Line)	
Halton	Burlington	86.4	53.7	105	Walkers Line	
Halton	Burlington	88.5	55.0	107	Regional Road 20 (Appleby Line)	
Halton	Burlington–Oakville boundary	90.5	56.2	109	Regional Road 21 (Burloak Drive)	
Halton	Oakville	92.1	57.2	110	Service Road	Access removed in 2008 to accommodate widening of the QEW
Halton	Oakville	92.5	57.5	111	Regional Road 25 (Bronte Road) – Milton	Formerly Highway 25
Halton	Oakville	94.6	58.8	113	3rd Line	To Oakville-Trafalgar Memorial Hospital
Halton	Oakville	97.7	60.7	116	Regional Road 17 (Dorval Drive)	
Halton	Oakville	97.7	60.7	117	Kerr Street	Westbound exit only
Halton	Oakville	98.8	61.4	118	Regional Road 3 (Trafalgar Road)	
Halton	Oakville	101.2	62.9	119	Royal Windsor Drive	Eastbound exit and westbound entrance; formerly Highway 122
Halton	Oakville	102.3– 104.9	63.6– 65.2	123	Regional Road 13 (Ford Drive)	Eastbound exit and westbound entrance; full access from Queen Elizabeth Way
Halton	Oakville	102.3– 104.9	63.6– 65.2	123	Queen Elizabeth Way – Toronto (Downtown)	Eastern end of Queen Elizabeth Way concurrency; eastbound exit and westbound entrance
Halton	Oakville	102.3– 104.9	63.6– 65.2	Highway 403 exit numbers resume		
Halton	Oakville	102.3– 104.9	63.6– 65.2	104	Regional Road 38 (Upper Middle Drive) to Regional Road 13 (Ford Drive)	Westbound exit and eastbound entrance
Halton–Peel boundary	Oakville–Mississauga boundary	106.3	66.1	106	Regional Road 5 (Dundas Street)	Formerly Highway 5
Halton–Peel boundary	Oakville–Mississauga boundary	109.4	68.0	109	407 ETR	Highway 407 exit 24; westbound signed as exits 109A (west) and 109B (east)
Peel	Mississauga	111.4	69.2	111	Regional Road 19 (Winston Churchill Boulevard)	No access to Highway 407 west from westbound entrance
Peel	Mississauga	112.4	69.8	112	Regional Road 1 (Erin Mills Parkway)	To Credit Valley Hospital
Peel	Mississauga	117.6	73.1	117	Mavis Road, Centre View Drive	
Peel	Mississauga	119.7	74.4	119	Hurontario Street	To Mississauga Hospital; formerly Highway 10
Peel	Mississauga	120.8	75.1	121	Regional Road 17 (Cawthra Road); Eastgate Parkway	
Peel	Mississauga	122.4	76.1	122	Eglinton Avenue	Eastbound exit is via exit 121
Peel	Mississauga	122.4	76.1	Western end of collector–express system		
Peel	Mississauga	123.9– 125.2	77.0– 77.8	—	Highway 401 – London, Toronto Highway 410 north – Brampton	Exit to westbound Highway 401 opened in 2018; eastern terminus of Highway 403; continues north as Highway 410; Highway 401 exit 344; to Toronto Pearson International Airport; only eastbound exit to Highway 401 east and westbound entrance from Highway 401 west via express lanes
1.000 mi = 1.609 km; 1.000 km = 0.621 mi: Closed/former; Concurrency terminus; Incomplete access; Tolled

Highway 403 descends the Niagara Escarpment in Hamilton
