= Frederick Waugh =

Frederick Waugh may refer to:

- Frederick Judd Waugh (1861–1940), American marine artist
- Frederick V. Waugh (1898–1974), American agricultural economist
- Frederick Wilkerson Waugh (1872–1924), amateur Canadian ethnologist and natural historian
- Fred Waugh (1869–1919), Australian rules footballer
