= Cainsville, Ontario =

Cainsville Bunnell's Landing
- Unincorporated community
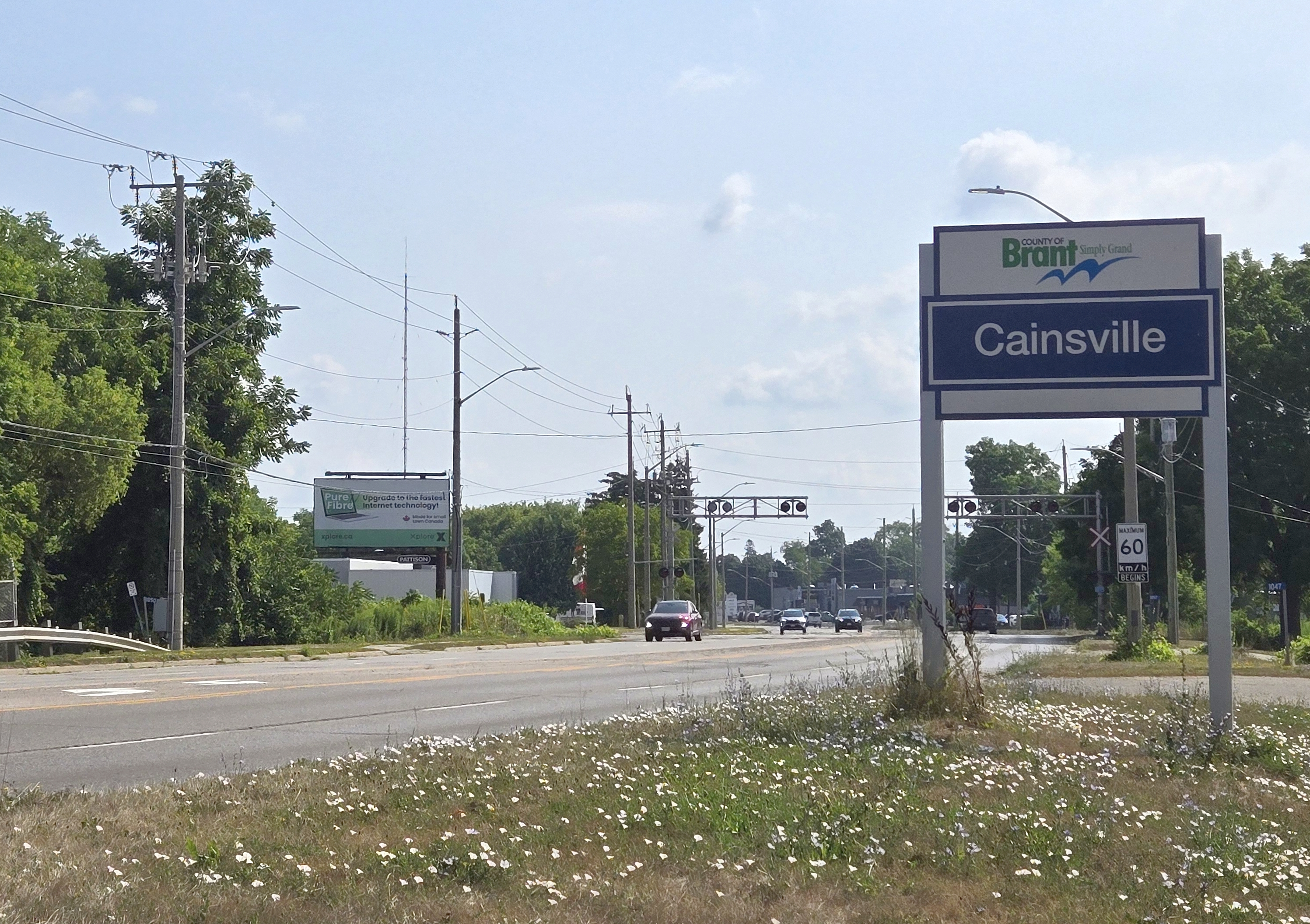

- Location within County of Brant Location within Southern Ontario
- Coordinates: 43.14669820984367°N 80.19902517958107°W
- Country: Canada
- Province: Ontario
- Municipality: Brant County & Brantford

Population
  - Total: 3,251
- Time zone: UTC-5 (EST)
  - Summer (DST): UTC-4 (EDT)
- Area codes: 519 and 226

Cainsville is a community straddling the boundary of Brantford and Brant County in Ontario, Canada.

Cainsville started off as a rural Black Canadian settlement called Bunnell's Landing.

== History ==
Joseph Brant had given an initial land grant to a handful of free, formerly enslaved Africans. Throughout the 1800s, other Black settlers, who were not part of the original land grant, purchased land in the area to be close to a larger Black community. Most of the settlers were African American freedom seekers or descendants of those who had escaped to the area through the Underground Railroad.

The community was named after Margaret and Peter Cain, two of its first settlers, and was laid out in 1837. Peter was born in Ireland while Margaret was First Nations, representing the diverse Indigenous, African and European heritage of the community’s early settlers.

George Brown, founder of the Globe and Mail newspaper, co-founder of the Liberal Party of Canada, and one of the architects of Canadian Confederation, purchased an 800-acre farm opposite the river from Cainsville in 1866. He lived on the farm until his death in 1880, which he called “the happiest days of my life”. A historical marker overlooking George Brown’s farm is visible at the corner of Johnson and Colborne Street in Cainsville.

Ontario Highway 53, runs through the community. This was the main East-West provincial highway until the completion of Highway 403 in 1997, which reduced the use of Highway 53 to local traffic.

A commemorative plaque in the area, situated on the Cainsville Trail, continuing from the Hamilton–Brantford–Cambridge Trails, on the underpass going under Colborne St, on the South side near Johnson Road reads:

Bunnell’s Landing: Early Black Settlement

When Joseph Brant and his supporters came to Canada from New York in 1784 they brought their American slaves with them to the Grand River Valley. Slavery was abolished in the British Empire by 1834 and so most of the Black families stayed here and settled along the river near Cainsville. Fugitive slaves from the South later joined them, coming through Buffalo across Lake Erie and then up the Grand River.

Until the Grand River Navigation Company locks were built in 1848, this site was as far up the river as cargo boats could travel. Later the Toronto, Hamilton and Buffalo Railways shipped goods from Brantford’s factories along this rail line. The landslide of 1986 destroyed the tracks and buried most evidence of settlement in this area.

Across the river from Bunnell’s Landing is Bow Park Farm, the home of George Brown (1818-1880), Journalist and Statesman. He was founder of the Canadian Liberal Party and of the Toronto Globe Newspaper. He also played an important role in Confederation.

Located at 948 Colborne Street, Cainsville Public School had operated since the early 1800s to educate the area’s children. Following Brantford’s annexation of the western half of the community, parents fought to keep the school open. It was eventually closed on June 30, 1988 and the student population was merged with Woodman Drive School, resulting in the renamed institution, Woodman-Cainsville School.

== Present day ==
At the time of the 2021 Canadian Census, the area had a total population of 3,251. The portion located in the City of Brantford had a population of 2,652 while the portion in Brant County had 599 residents.

The area in Brantford experienced rapid population growth in recent decades due to the establishment of several subdivisions along Garden Ave and Johnson Road. This area, annexed by the city in the 1980s, is the most culturally diverse neighbourhood within Brantford. The area in Brant County remains largely rural, with some industrial and commercial activity.

The Hamilton–Brantford–Cambridge Trails, part of the Southern loop of the Trans Canada Trail runs through Cainsville.

The new 9,200 sq.ft Cainsville Community Centre was built at 15 Ewart Drive in 2023.

== Notable people ==
- Adelaide Hoodless, founder of the Women's Institute, Victorian Order of Nurses, & National Council of Women of Canada
- George Brown, anti-slavery activist, founder of the Liberal Party of Canada, and the Globe & Mail Newspaper

== See also ==
- List of unincorporated communities in Ontario
- Black Canadians in Ontario
