= Frederick Wilkerson Waugh =

Canadian ethnologist

- Born: 4 April 1872; Langford, Ontario, Canada
- Disappeared: September 1924 (aged 52); Kahnawake, Quebec, Canada
- Occupations: Ethnologist; Natural historian
- Years active: c. 1911–1924
- Spouse: Nancy Hutchinson (m. 1894)
- Children: 2

Academic work
- Institutions: Bureau of American Ethnology; Geological Survey of Canada
- Main interests: Anthropology of Haudenosaunee communities
- Notable works: Iroquis foods and food preparation (1916)

Frederick Wilkerson Waugh (1872 – 1924) was an amateur Canadian ethnologist and natural historian who worked with the Geological Survey of Canada, and with a range of Haudenosaunee (Six Nations) communities and nations, including the Cayuga, Mohawk, Oneida, Seneca, and Tuscarora, as well as with Ojibwe communities, and in Labrador with the Naskapi, Innu, and Inuit communities. Largely self-taught, Waugh bridged the gap between amateur and professional anthropology during a period of significant transition in the discipline.

== Early life and education ==
Born on April 4, 1872, in Langford, Ontario, Waugh was the son of George and Ellen (Vanderlip) Waugh; and, together with his younger sister, Susan, they grew up in the hamlet of Langford in Brant County, Ontario; some 10 kilometres (6.2 mi) north of the Six Nations of the Grand River. He was fostered a lifelong interest in Indigenous cultures. His father was a painter; and it was most likely that Waugh attended a "normal school," although the details of his education are unclear. Waugh worked as a teacher on Manitoulin Island in the 1890s and later pursued unpaid research in archaeology and folklore, including with the Bureau of American Ethnology. He married Nancy Hutchinson in 1894; and they had two children, Richard (b. 1897) and Reginald Goldwin (b. 1905). Waugh relocated to Toronto by 1901, where he and Nancy ran a boarding house; and he began unpaid research for the archaeological branch of the Ontario Provincial Museum in Brant County, while doing paid work editing the Toronto-based Furniture Journal.

== Career ==
Whilst working (unpaid) for the Ontario Provincial Museum, Waugh founded a folklore society with William Wintemberg. In 1911, Waugh was offered a position in Ottawa to work with Edward Sapir, the chief anthropologist of the Geological Survey of Canada, to study material culture in Six Nations communities. He was the Survey's first ethnological preparator in 1913, a role that involved both curatorial and research duties. Over 11 years, Waugh conducted fieldwork with several Indigenous groups, including the northern Innu (Naskapi), Inuit, and northern Ojibwe. Waugh's ethnographic work included studying material culture, language, and folklore, with the aspiration to document Indigenous cultures and languages "verging on extinction." He also oversaw and collected ethnological collections in the Victoria Memorial Museum, affiliated with the Geological Survey, throughout field seasons from 1911 to 1918.

In 1916, he began a series of three expeditions to Lake Superior "hinterlands" to conduct fieldwork with northern Ojibwe nations. In the same year, he published Iroquis foods and food preparation, and drew from more than 700 pages of notes on Six Nations folktales.

Waugh began researching Innu hunter communities in northern Labrador in 1920. His field methods there were innovative for their time, as he sought to immerse himself directly in the communities he studied. During the 1921 expedition to Labrador, he attempted to travel with the Innu band throughout their winter season to document their lifestyle. He was accompanied on the trip by E. W. Calvert, an amateur ornithologist from London, Ontario, who was charged with cooking duties along with a request from the Department of the Interior to document regional birds and mammals. Waugh failed to find a good interpreter, and instead hired Herbert Pitcher to assist with camp duties. When they reached the Inuit village of Nain on August 22, 1921, they temporarily stayed with John Voisey, one of the areas few permanent (European) residents.

Waugh met two families there from the Mushuau Innu band, whose communities had been plagued by recent famine and previous bouts of measles and small pox. From there, Waugh and his team went inland following the Assiwaban River (Ashuapun-shipu or Koraluk) hoping to find Innu en route to hunting locations in the valley of the George. They were unsuccessful, however, and returned with only notes about the natural environment. Innu, he later found out, "were avoiding me very carefully" because they thought he was there to enforce recent "game law with regard to caribou." Without an interpreter, he also fared poorly further inland in the Spring. He did forge a relationship with one elder named Old Harriet, also known as Mrs. Deer, who knew traditional stories from Hebron. He also took many photographs in Nain, mostly of daily life, and did take lesser numbers of photos with Innu communities.

== Disappearance and legacy ==
In 1924, Waugh conducted fieldwork among the southern Innu (Montagnais) in Sept-Îles, Quebec, with his son, Goldwin. There he documented knowledge from a community member from Fort Chimo, as well as Seven Islands. En route to Ottawa in late-September, at age 52, Waugh sent Goldwin ahead while he stopped in Kahnawake, a Mohawk reserve near Montreal, in order to acquire museum collections. He vanished mysteriously. Investigations into his disappearance by the RCMP and Geological Survey were inconclusive. His Survey colleague Diamond Jennes speculated that Waugh fell from a railway bridge while heading to the island of Montreal.

Waugh's museum collections are held at the Canadian Museum of History (formerly Canadian Museum of Civilization), which include wide-ranging items related to technologies, games, clothing, decorative items, food, and plant specimens, photographs, transcribed stories and notes on food preparation and plant medicines, and correspondence with a range of prominent anthropologists and community members. Other legacy materials were gifted to the American Philosophical Society by William Fenton in 1950.

== See also ==
- List of people who disappeared mysteriously (1910–1970)
