= Ontario Highway 24 =

Ontario provincial highway

Highway 24
- A map of Highway 24; Highway 24 Connecting Links

Route information
- Maintained by the Ministry of Transportation of Ontario
- Length: 64.1 km (39.8 mi)
- Existed: July 2, 1927–present

Major junctions
- South end: Highway 3 in Simcoe
- Highway 403 in Brantford
- North end: Cambridge south limits

Location
- Country: Canada
- Province: Ontario
- Major cities: Simcoe, Paris, Brantford, Cambridge

Highway system
- Ontario provincial highways; Current; Former; 400-series
| ← Highway 23 | → Highway 26 |
Former provincial highways
| Highway 25 → |

King's Highway 24, commonly referred to as Highway 24, is a highway in the Canadian province of Ontario that currently begins at Highway 3 in Simcoe, and ends at the southern city limits of Cambridge. The south–north route travels through Brantford, as well as the community of Scotland. Outside of those communities, Highway 24 travels through a predominantly agricultural area.

Highway 24 was established in 1927 between Simcoe and Guelph. Between 1936 and 1938, it was extended northeast to Collingwood, as well as south from Simcoe to Port Dover. Much of the section of highway between Caledon Village and Collingwood followed Hurontario Street (partially as a concurrency with Highway 10), with the section of that historic route from Orangeville and Glen Huron being bypassed. Construction of a new route between Simcoe and Brantford took place in the mid-1960s, bypassing the town of Waterford.

In 1997 and 1998, the majority of Highway 24 – both south of Simcoe, as well as north of and through Cambridge – was transferred to the responsibility of the various counties and regions through which it travelled. The former sections of the route are now known as Norfolk County Highway 24, Waterloo Regional Road 24, Peel Regional Road 24, and County Road 124 in Wellington, Dufferin, Grey and Simcoe Counties.

== Route description ==
Highway 24 descends into the Grand River valley south of Cambridge

Highway 24 begins at Highway 3 in the town of Simcoe. The highway once continued south, but this has since been transferred to local jurisdiction and is now Norfolk County Highway 24. Within Simcoe, it is maintained under a Connecting Link agreement for approximately 2.5 kilometres (1.6 mi). North of the town, Highway 24 travels in a straight line northward through Norfolk County, with farmland dominating the surroundings. As the highway approaches the community of Scotland, it enters Brant County. It turns northeast and bypasses to the east of the community, then meanders through thick forests for several kilometres. It returns to farmland and curves northward before intersecting former Highway 53 (Colborne Street West) near Brantford Municipal Airport.

A short distance north of former Highway 53, which is now known as Brant County Highway 53, Highway 24 encounters an interchange with Highway 403 (Exit 27) south of Paris. The route joins concurrently with Highway 403 for 9 kilometres (5.6 mi) east into Brantford. Highway 24 splits from Highway 403 to resume its northward orientation at the King George Road interchange (Exit 36). The highway is maintained under a Connecting Link agreement for 2.2 kilometres (1.4 mi) north of Highway 403, serving as a principal business route through the northern portion of the city. Between Brantford and Cambridge, Highway 24 is a busy two lane rural highway that has played host to frequent collisions, prompting a Ministry of Transportation of Ontario (MTO) investigation into possible upgrades to the stretch.

Highway 24 formerly continued through Cambridge including an interchange with Highway 401, and onward to Collingwood, until January 1, 1998 when it was downloaded from the province to local municipalities. Now known as Hespeler Road between Highway 401 to the city limits at Wellington Road 124, the section between Highway 401 and Fisher Mills Road is a four-lane limited-access expressway divided by a concrete median barrier, constructed in the late 1980s as a bypass.

Highway 24 is generally straight and flat as it progresses north through the agricultural countryside of Brant County, but suddenly drops into the Grand River Valley as it enters the Regional Municipality of Waterloo. It follows the river along its eastern bank towards Cambridge, ending at the southern city limits. Within Wellington, Dufferin, Grey and Simcoe counties, the former route of Highway 24 is now designated as County Highway 124, while in Waterloo and Peel Regions the route is designated Regional Road 24. Within Wellington County, there is also an unrelated County Road 24.

== History ==
Hespeler Road was constructed as a bypass for Highway 24, only to be transferred to the Region of Waterloo in 1998

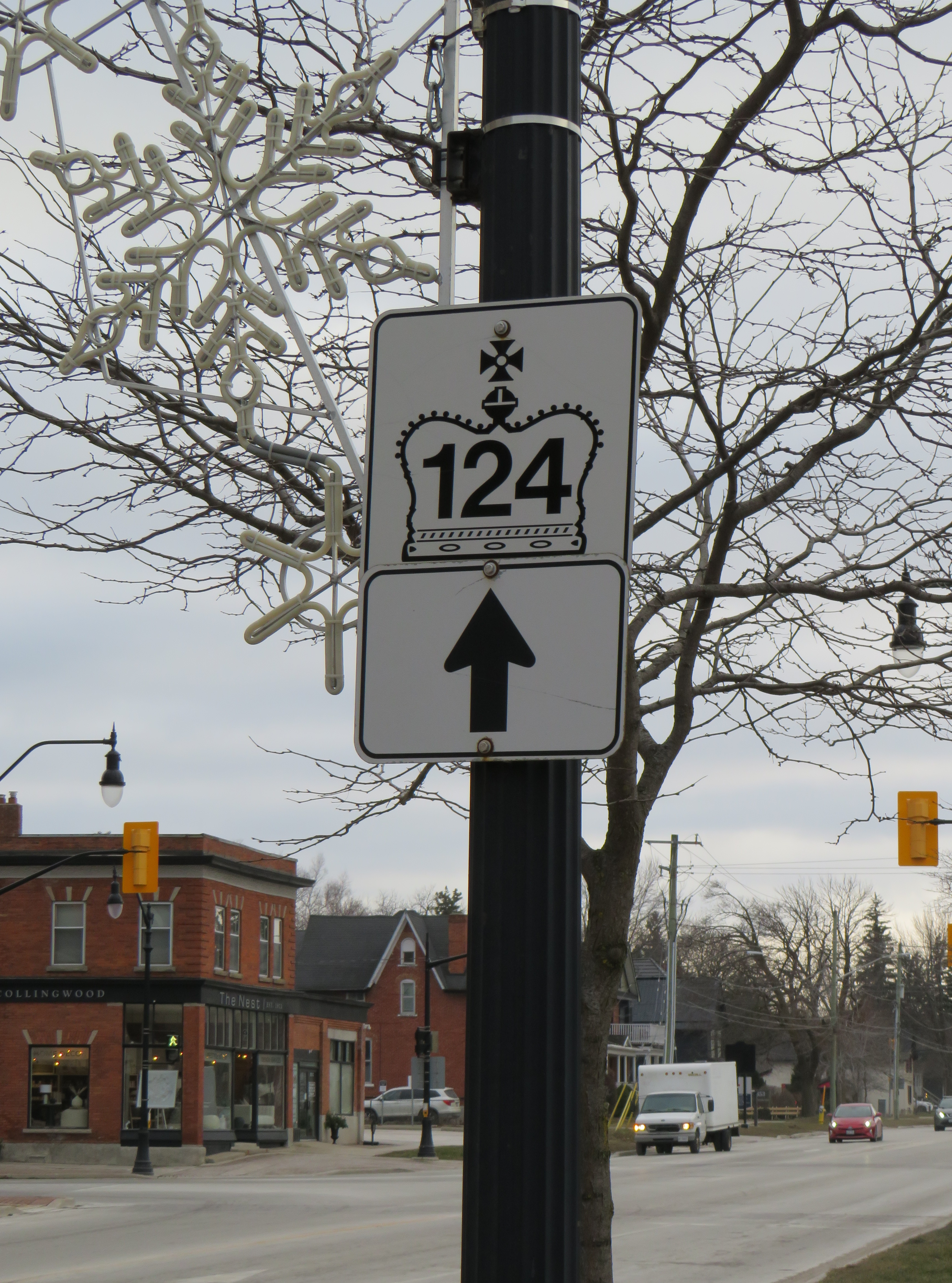
Erroneous signage in Collingwood showing former Highway 24 as "Highway 124" due to wrong use of a provincial highway shield rather than the proper Simcoe County Road 124 shield (the actual Highway 124 runs between Parry Sound and Sundridge)

Highway 24 was first designated on July 2, 1927, when the Department of Highways (DHO) assumed the road between Highway 3 at Simcoe and Highway 2 in Brantford, as well as the road connecting Highway 2 in Paris with Highway 6 in Guelph, via Galt (Cambridge), as a new provincial highway. In addition, a concurrency was established with Highway 2 between Brantford and Paris. Highway 24 originally entered Brantford along Mount Pleasant Street, before turning northeast onto Oxford Street (renamed Colborne Street West circa 1947), then going northwest having a concurrently with Highway 2 (Brant Avenue / Paris Road) to Paris. At Church Street in Paris, it branched from Highway 2 north along Dumfries Street and then Grand River Street towards Cambridge. On June 4, 1930 a more direct routing between Brantford and Cambridge was established; the route between Paris and Cambridge was renumbered as Highway 24A. As a result, the concurrency between Highway 2 and Highway 24 was reduced, with Highway 24 now departing Highway 2 in Brantford, along St. Paul Avenue and King George Road.

On September 9, 1936, the highway was extended south from Simcoe to Lake Erie then east to Highway 6 in Port Dover. This was followed several months later by an extension from Guelph through Erin to the Wellington–Peel county boundary, which was assumed on March 31, 1937. On August 11, 1937, the DHO designated the Shelburne to Collingwood Road as Highway 24. The highway turned east at Singhampton and continued to near Glen Huron, where it curved back north to rejoin Hurontario Street until its terminus in Collingwood. This left a large gap in the highway, including the terminus near Erin that did not end at a provincial highway. This was remedied eight months later when the DHO assumed several county roads in Peel County (now the Regional Municipality of Peel) on April 13, 1938. This established Highway 24 between the county boundary and Orangeville, via Alton, as well as Highway 51 between Highway 10 in Caledon Village and Coulterville. In addition, Highway 10 and Highway 24 were signed concurrently between Orangeville and Shelburne. By 1963, the segment of Highway 24 through Alton was redesignated as Highway 136, as Highway 24 was re-routed along a redesignated Highway 51 towards Highway 10 in that year.

Construction of a new route for Highway 24 between Simcoe and Brantford began on October 9, 1963. While originally intended to be an extension of Highway 24A between Simcoe and Paris, it would instead serve as a rerouting of Highway 24 upon completion as far north as the Highway 53 junction south of Paris by 1968. In 1970, the southern terminus of Highway 24 was rerouted southwest to end at Highway 59 near Walsingham, with Highway 6 absorbing the short length west of Port Dover to Halfway House Corner.

As part of a series of budget cuts initiated by premier Mike Harris under his Common Sense Revolution platform in 1995, numerous highways deemed to no longer be of significance to the provincial network were decommissioned and responsibility for the routes transferred to a lower level of government, a process referred to as downloading. Portions of Highway 24 were consequently transferred to local jurisdictions in 1997 and 1998. On April 1, 1997, the southernmost section, between Highway 59 and Highway 3 at Simcoe, was transferred to Norfolk County. On January 1, 1998, the section north of Cambridge, through Waterloo and onward to Collingwood, was transferred to the various counties and regions through which it travelled.

== Major intersections ==
The following table lists the major junctions along Highway 24, as noted by the Ministry of Transportation of Ontario.

| Division | Location | km | mi | Exit | Destinations | Notes |
|---|---|---|---|---|---|---|
| Norfolk | Walsingham | −32.1 | −19.9 | | County Road 60 west Norfolk County Highway 24 begins County Highway 59 – Port Rowan, Tillsonburg | Former Highway 24 southern terminus; formerly Highway 59 |
| Norfolk | Halfway House Corner | −7.0 | −4.3 | | County Highway 6 east – Port Dover | Formerly Highway 6 north |
| Norfolk | Simcoe | −1.0 | −0.62 | | County Road 1 west (Robinson Street) / Argyle Street | |
| Norfolk | Simcoe | 0.0 | 0.0 | | Highway 24 begins Norfolk County Highway 24 ends Highway 3 – Delhi, Jarvis | Highway 24 southern terminus; beginning of Simcoe Connecting Link agreement |
| Norfolk | Simcoe | 0.4 | 0.25 | | County Road 35 west (Second Avenue) | |
| Norfolk | Simcoe | 1.2 | 0.75 | | County Road 40 west (14th Street) | |
| Norfolk | Simcoe | 2.5 | 1.6 | | | End of Simcoe Connecting Link agreement |
| Norfolk | | 3.7 | 2.3 | | County Road 24 north (Old Highway 24) – Waterford | |
| Norfolk | | 8.3 | 5.2 | | County Road 9 east (Thompson Road) – Waterford | |
| Norfolk | | 9.6 | 6.0 | | County Road 9 west (Windham Centre Road) – Windham Centre | |
| Norfolk | | 14.9 | 9.3 | | County Road 19 west | |
| Norfolk | | 15.2 | 9.4 | | County Road 19 east | |
| Brant | Scotland | 19.7 | 12.2 | | County Road 4 west (Vanessa Road) | |
| Brant | Scotland | 20.9 | 13.0 | | County Road 4 (Oakland Road) | |
| Brant | | 30.4 | 18.9 | | County Road 12 east (Arthur Road) | |
| Brant | | 31.2 | 19.4 | | County Highway 53 (Colborne Street West) – Burford, Brantford | Formerly Highway 53; near Brantford Airport |
| Brant | | 36.0 | 22.4 | 27 | County Highway 24 north (Rest Acres Road) – Paris Highway 403 west – London | Southern end of Highway 403 concurrency; exit numbers follow Highway 403 |
| Brantford | | 39.5 | 24.5 | 30 | County Road 27 (Oak Park Road) | |
| Brantford | | 33.1 | 20.6 | 33 | County Highway 2 (Paris Road) | No access from northbound Highway 24 to westbound Paris Road or from eastbound Paris Road to southbound Highway 24; formerly Highway 2 |
| Brantford | | 45.0 | 28.0 | 36 | Highway 403 east – Hamilton King George Road | Northern end of Highway 403 concurrency; beginning of Brantford Connecting Link |
| Brantford | | 47.2 | 29.3 | | Powerline Road | End of Brantford Connecting Link |
| Brant | Osborne Corners | 49.2 | 30.6 | | County Highway 5 west / County Highway 99 east (Governors Road E) – Paris, Hamilton | Formerly Highway 5 west / Highway 99 east; former southern end of Highway 5 concurrency |
| Brant | | 52.7 | 32.7 | | County Highway 5 east – Burlington; County Road 35 west (Blue Lake Road) | Formerly Highway 5 east; former northern end of Highway 5 concurrency |
| Brant–Waterloo boundary | North Dumfries | 59.3 | 36.8 | | County Road 144 east (Lockie Road) | |
| Waterloo | North Dumfries | 59.7 | 37.1 | | Regional Road 45 south (East River Road) | To Brant County Road 14 |
| Waterloo | Cambridge | 64.1 | 39.8 | | Highway 24 ends Waterloo Regional Road 24 begins Regional Road 81 east (McQueen Shaver Boulevard) | Cambridge city limits; Highway 24 northern terminus |
| Waterloo | Cambridge | 68.7 | 42.7 | | Regional Road 8 (Coronation Boulevard) | Formerly Highway 8 |
| Waterloo | Cambridge | 73.3 | 45.5 | | Highway 401 – London, Toronto | Highway 401 exit 282 |
| Waterloo–Wellington boundary | Cambridge–Woolwich–Guelph/Eramosa boundary | 80.4 | 50.0 | | Waterloo Regional Road 24 ends Wellington County Road 124 begins Regional Road 31 west (Kossuth Road) | |
| Wellington | Guelph/Eramosa | | | No major junctions | | |
| Guelph | | 86.8 | 53.9 | | Wellington County Road 124 breaks Fife Road | Guelph city limits |
| Guelph | | 87.8 | 54.6 | | Highway 6 / Highway 7 west (Hanlon Expressway) to Highway 401 – Mount Forest, Hamilton | Interchange; former southern end of Highway 7 concurrency |
| Guelph | | 90.3 | 56.1 | | Highway 7 east (Wyndham Street South) – Acton | Former northern end of Highway 7 concurrency |
| Wellington | Guelph/Eramosa | 95.3 | 59.2 | | Wellington County Road 124 resumes | Guelph city limits |
| Wellington | Erin | 111.2 | 69.1 | | County Road 125 south | Ospringe; formerly Highway 25 south; former southern end of Highway 25 concurrency |
| Wellington | Erin | 118.1 | 73.4 | | County Road 24 | Brisbane; formerly Highway 25 north; former northern end of Highway 25 concurrency |
| Wellington–Peel boundary | Erin–Caledon boundary | 126.2 | 78.4 | | Wellington County Road 124 ends Peel Regional Road 24 begins Wellington County Road 25 / Peel Regional Road 19 (Winston Churchill Boulevard) | |
| Peel | Caledon | 130.3 | 81.0 | | Regional Road 136 north (Main Street) – Alton | Coulterville; formerly Highway 136 north |
| Peel | Caledon | 134.5 | 83.6 | | Highway 10 (Hurontario Street) – Orangeville, Brampton Regional Road 24 east (Charleston Sideroad) | Caledon Village; formerly Highway 24 northern terminus; Regional Road 24 continues east |
1.000 mi = 1.609 km; 1.000 km = 0.621 mi: Closed/former; Concurrency terminus; Incomplete access; Route transition

== Suffixed routes ==
=== Highway 24A ===
Highway 24A
- Location: Paris – Bannister Lake Complex
- Length: 7.6 km (4.7 mi)
- Existed: June 4, 1930–April 1, 1997

Map of Highway 24A, circa 1996

Highway 24A was the original route of Highway 24 within what is now Brant County. The route travelled north from Paris to just north of the South Dumfries–North Dumfries boundary, ending at the southern edge of the Bannister Lake Complex in Waterloo Region. While Highway 24 was rerouted to the east on June 4, 1930, the Highway 24A designation did not become official until 1933, with two forks of Highway 24 existing prior to then. Following the formation of the Regional Municipality of Waterloo in the mid-1970s, the portion of Highway 24A north of the regional boundary was decommissioned, becoming Waterloo Regional Road 75. The route remained unchanged until April 1, 1997, when it was transferred in its entirety to Brant County. It is now known as Brant County Highway 24A.

== See also ==
Hurontario Street
