= List of numbered roads in Brant County =

List of county roads

This is a list of numbered roads in the County of Brant, in the Canadian province of Ontario. There are two classes of numbered roads in Brant County: county highways, former King's Highways downloaded to county responsibility in the late 1990s; and county roads, analogous to the county roads of other counties.

== County Highways ==
Number	Local Name(s)	Southern/Western Terminus	Northern/Eastern Terminus	Settlements served	Additional Notes
Brant County Highway 2	Governors Road W King Edward Street; Dundas Street; Paris Road; Regional Road 2/53	Muir Line	Hamilton city (old Wentworth county) limits	Gobles, Etonia, Falkland, Paris, Cainsville, Langford	Formerly Highway 2; does not exist within Brantford city limits; shares roadway with County Highway 53 from Brantford to Hamilton
Brant County Highway 5	Dundas Street; Governors Road E Highway 24; Beverly Street	Regional Road 2	Harrisburg Road	Paris, Osborne Corners	Formerly Highway 5; shares roadway with Highway 24 for 3.8 km (2.4 mi)
Brant County Highway 24	Rest Acres Road	Highway 403 / Highway 24 south	Regional Road 2	Paris	Formerly Highway 7094
Brant County Highway 24A	Grand River Street N Pinehurst Road	Regional Road 2	Brant-Waterloo Road	Paris, Pinehurst Park	Formerly Highway 24A
Brant County Highway 53	Highway 53; King Street; Colborne Street	Muir Line	Hamilton city (old Wentworth county) limits	Cathcart, Burford, Bishopsgate, Mount Vernon, Cainsville, Langford	Formerly Highway 53; does not exist within Brantford city limits; shares roadway with County Highway 2 from Brantford to Hamilton; former King's Highway ran from Hamilton to Woodstock
Brant County Highway 54	Highway 54	County Road 18	Onondaga Townline Road	Onondaga, Middleport	Formerly Highway 54; former King's Highway continued to Cayuga
Brant County Highway 99	Governors Road E	Highway 24	Bethel Church Road	Osborne Corners	Formerly Highway 99; former King's Highway continued to Dundas

== County Roads ==
Number	Local Name(s)	Southern/Western Terminus	Northern/Eastern Terminus	Settlements served	Additional Notes
Brant County Road 3	Norwich Road	Base Line	County Road 16	Scotland	
Brant County Road 4	Vanessa Road; Oakland Road; Cockshutt Road	Burford-Delhi Townline Road	Erie Avenue	Scotland, Oakland, East Oakland, Burtch	
Brant County Road 6	Sour Springs Road	County Road 4	Mohawk Road	Six Nations of the Grand River First Nation	
Brant County Road 7	Pleasant Ridge Road	County Road 24	Regional Road 53	Oakhill	minor rural route
Brant County Road 8	White Swan Road; McBay Road; Painter Road	Regional Road 54	Regional Road 2/53	Onondaga	
Brant County Road 11	Lynden Road	Garden Avenue	Misener Road	Brantford	
Brant County Road 12	Arthur Road	Highway 24	County Road 7	none	minor connecting route
Brant County Road 13	Branchton Road; McLean School Road; St. George Road	Regional Road 99	County Road 144	St. George, Bruces	
Brant County Road 14	East River Road	County Road 55	Region of Waterloo limits	Paris, Glen Morris, Lockie	
Brant County Road 15	Ayr Road	County Road 36	Brant-Waterloo Road	none	minor rural route
Brant County Road 16	Bishopsgate Road; Simcoe Street	County Road 3	Regional Road 2	Scotland, Bishopsgate, Falkland	
Brant County Road 17	Jerseyville Road	Regional Road 2/53	Misener Road	none	minor connecting route
Brant County Road 18	Phelps Road; County Road 18	County Road 24	Henry Street	Newport, Cainsville	
Brant County Road 19	Drumbo Road	Brant-Oxford Road	County Road 15	none	minor connecting route
Brant County Road 20	Indian Line	County Road 4	Jenkins Road/Bateman Line	none	
Brant County Road 21	Golf Links Road	County Road 25	County Road 16	none	minor rural route
Brant County Road 22	County Road 22, formerly McBlain Road	Regional Road 54	Sawmill Road	none	minor connecting route
Brant County Road 24	Mount Pleasant Road; King Street	Jenkins Road	Tutela Heights Road	Mount Pleasant, Maple Grove, Oakland	
Brant County Road 25	Middle Townline Road	Burford-Delhi Townline Road	Regional Road 2	Harley, Northfield Centre	
Brant County Road 26	Burtch Road	County Road 7	County Road 4	Mount Pleasant, Burtch	
Brant County Road 27	Oak Park Road	County Road 23	Regional Road 2	none	minor connecting route
Brant County Road 28	Glen Morris Road	Regional Road 24A	County Road 14	Glen Morris	
Brant County Road 31	Fairfield Road	County Road 25	County Road 16	Fairfield Plain	
Brant County Road 33	German School Road	County Road 13	Harrisburg Road	Harrisburg	
Brant County Road 35	Blue Lake Road	County Road 14	King's Highway 24	none	minor rural route
Brant County Road 36	Puttown Road; Keg Lane	Regional Road 2	County Road 15	Paris, Falkland	minor connecting route; divided into two non-continuous lengths by Brant County Road 136
Brant County Road 44	Cockshutt Road	Jenkins Road	County Road 4	East Oakland	
Brant County Road 50	William Street	Regional Road 24A	County Road 14	Paris	
Brant County Road 51	Willow Street	Regional Road 5	County Road 55	Paris	
Brant County Road 52	Silver Street	County Road 36	Regional Road 24A	Paris	
Brant County Road 55	Green Lane	intersection of Regional Road 2 & 5	County Road 14	Paris	minor connecting route
Brant County Road 129	Muir Road South	County Road 202	Highway 53	Muir, New Durham	
Brant County Road 130	Muir Road North	Highway 53	Highway 2	Muir	
Brant County Road 134	Governors Road West	Regional Road 2	County Road 136	none	minor connecting route
Brant County Road 136	Brant-Oxford Road	County Road 134	County Road 36	none	minor connecting route; Brant County Road 36 continues from both ends of this route
Brant County Road 144	Lockie Road	Regional Road 24	County Road 13	Lockie	unpaved
Brant County Road 202	Harley Road	Muir Road	Regional Road 53	Harley, New Durham	

== Former county roads ==
Number	Local Name(s)	Southern/Western Terminus	Northern/Eastern Terminus	Settlements served	Additional Notes
Brant County Road 2	Harley Road	Muir Road South	Regional Road 53	Harley, New Durham	
Brant County Road 5	Cockshutt Road	Jenkins Road	County Road 4	East Oakland	
Brant County Road 7	Green Lane	County Highway 2 / County Highway 5	County Road 14	Paris	minor connecting route
Brant County Road 9	Tutela Heights Road	County Road 24	County Road 4	Brantford, Tutela Heights	
Brant County Road 9	McBay Road and Baptist Church Road	Highway 2/53	Haldimand County	Fairfield Plain	
Brant County Road 10	Jerseyville Road	Highway 2/53	Hamilton city limits		
Brant County Road 12	Rest Acres Road	Highway 53	Highway 2	Paris	
Brant County Road 10	Fairfield Road	County Road 25	County Road 16	Fairfield Plain	
Brant County Road 17	Robinson Road	Rest Acres Park	County Road 12		
Brant County Road 17	River Road	County Road 4	Mohawk Road	Six Nations of the Grand River First Nation	
Brant County Road 18	Tutela Heights Road	County Road 24	County Road 4	Brantford, Tutela Heights	
Brant County Road 21	Middle Townline Road	Norfolk County	County Road 3	Kelvin	
Brant County Road 23	Powerline Road	Grand River	County Road 32	Brantford	
Brant County Road 24	Pleasant Ridge Road	Highway 24 (now County Road 24)	Regional Road 53	Oakhill	minor rural route
Brant County Road 29	Powerline Road	County Road 16	County Road 30	none	
Brant County Road 30	Mile Hill Road, Washington Street	Powerline Road	Highway 2	Paris	
Brant County Road 31	Oakhill Drive	Highway 53	Highway 53	Oakhill	
Brant County Road 32	Park Road North	County Road 23	Regional Road 99	Brantford	
Brant County Road 34	Lockie Road	Highway 24	County Road 13	Lockie	unpaved
Brant County Road 37	Powerline Road	Grand River	County Road 32	Brantford	
Brant County Road 37	Middle Townline Road	County Road 3	Highway 53	Harley	
Brant County Road 38	Henry Street	Brantford city limits	Highway 403	Brantford	
Brant County Road 53	Green Lane	County Highway 2 / County Highway 5	County Road 14	Paris	minor connecting route
Brant County Road 122	Sawmill Road	Trinity Road	Carluke Road	none	minor connecting route
