= Places named after the Channel Islands =

A number of places in the world, like the places named after places of the United Kingdom, were named after the Channel Islands, or some place therein. Not all are named directly for one of the islands, but are often named indirectly, such as for another place on the list.

Labelled map of the Channel Islands

The Channel Islands in relation to the rest of the British Isles (dark grey), off the coast of France (pale grey).

== United States ==
=== Jersey ===
- New Jersey
- Jersey Shore, New Jersey
- Jersey City, New Jersey
- Jerseyville, New Jersey
- Clements, Maryland — named after Saint Clement, Jersey
- Jersey, Arkansas
- Jersey, Georgia — named for a Jersey bull, a breed that comes from the island of Jersey
- Jersey, Ohio
- Jersey, Virginia — named after the breed of cattle
- Jersey County, Illinois — named after its county seat and largest city, Jerseyville
- Jersey Township, Jersey County, Illinois
- Jersey Township, Licking County, Ohio — named after New Jersey by settlers from that state
- Jersey Island (California)
- Jerseyville, Illinois — named by a native of New Jersey

=== Guernsey ===
- Guernsey, Indiana
- Guernsey, Iowa — named after Guernsey County, Ohio
- Guernsey, Ohio
- Guernsey, Wyoming
- Guernsey County, Ohio
- Sarnia, North Dakota — named for Sarnia, Ontario, which in turn was named for Guernsey (Sarnia is the Latin name for Guernsey)

== Canada ==
=== Jersey ===
- Caesarea, Ontario — (Caesarea is thought to be the Latin name for Jersey)
- Hermitage-Sandyville, Newfoundland and Labrador — named after Hermitage Rock, a tidal islet off the coast of Saint Helier, Jersey
- Jersey Harbour, Newfoundland and Labrador
- Jerseyside — neighborhood of Placentia, Newfoundland and Labrador
- Jerseyville, Ontario — named for New Jersey by settlers from that state
- St. Ouens, Manitoba — named for Saint Ouen, Jersey, one of its twelve parishes

=== Guernsey ===
- Guernsey, Saskatchewan
- Guernsey Cove, Prince Edward Island
- Ramea, Newfoundland and Labrador — named for Le Ramée, a neighborhood/street in Saint Peter Port, the capital of Guernsey
- Sarnia, Ontario — named by Lieutenant Governor Sir John Colborne after Guernsey, where he'd previously been lieutenant governor (Sarnia is the Latin name for Guernsey)
- Sarnia No. 221, Saskatchewan

=== Alderney ===
- Alderney Landing, Dartmouth, Nova Scotia

== Elsewhere ==
=== Jersey ===
- Jerseyville, New South Wales, Australia
- Saint Heliers, a suburb of Auckland, New Zealand (named after Saint Helier in Jersey)
