= Hanlon Expressway =

Limited-access highway in Ontario

Hanlon Expressway
- Hanlon Parkway
- Hanlon Expressway highlighted in red

Route information
- Maintained by Ministry of Transportation of Ontario
- Length: 15.4 km (9.6 mi)
- History: Proposed 1967; Opened June 28, 1972 – November 7, 1975

Major junctions
- South end: Highway 401 – London, Toronto
- Highway 7 east – Brampton
- North end: Highway 6 / Highway 7 – Waterloo, Owen Sound

Location
- Country: Canada
- Province: Ontario
- Counties: Wellington
- Major cities: Guelph

Highway system
- Ontario provincial highways; Current; Former; 400-series

The Hanlon Expressway or Hanlon Parkway is a limited controlled-access expressway connecting Highway 401 with the city of Guelph in the Canadian province of Ontario. The 17 km (11 mi) route travels in a generally north–south direction on the city's west side. It is signed as Highway 6 for its entire length; from Wellington Street to Woodlawn Road it is concurrent with Highway 7. The speed limit alternates between 70 and 80 km/h (45 and 50 mph).

Between Highway 401 and Guelph, the Hanlon Expressway took over the Highway 6 routing from Brock Road (now Wellington Road 46). After years of planning and engineering, the route was built between 1972 and 1975. Originally designed to be a freeway, it was instead completed largely as a super-4 expressway with at-grade intersections since budget limitations precluded the construction of interchanges and overpasses, apart from an interchange at its southern terminus with Highway 401. There are also two railway crossings near the northern terminus, though both are for spur lines. Several decades later, several additional interchanges have been built; Wellington Street West (Highway 7 and former Highway 24) which was completed in 2001, Laird Road which opened in 2013, and Wellington County Road 34 which was opened in 2025.

== Route description ==
Wellington Street interchange facing east. Highway 7 and former Highway 24 travel into the distance; Highway 6 travels south (right); former Highway 24 travels west (down); and Highway 6 and 7 travel north (left).

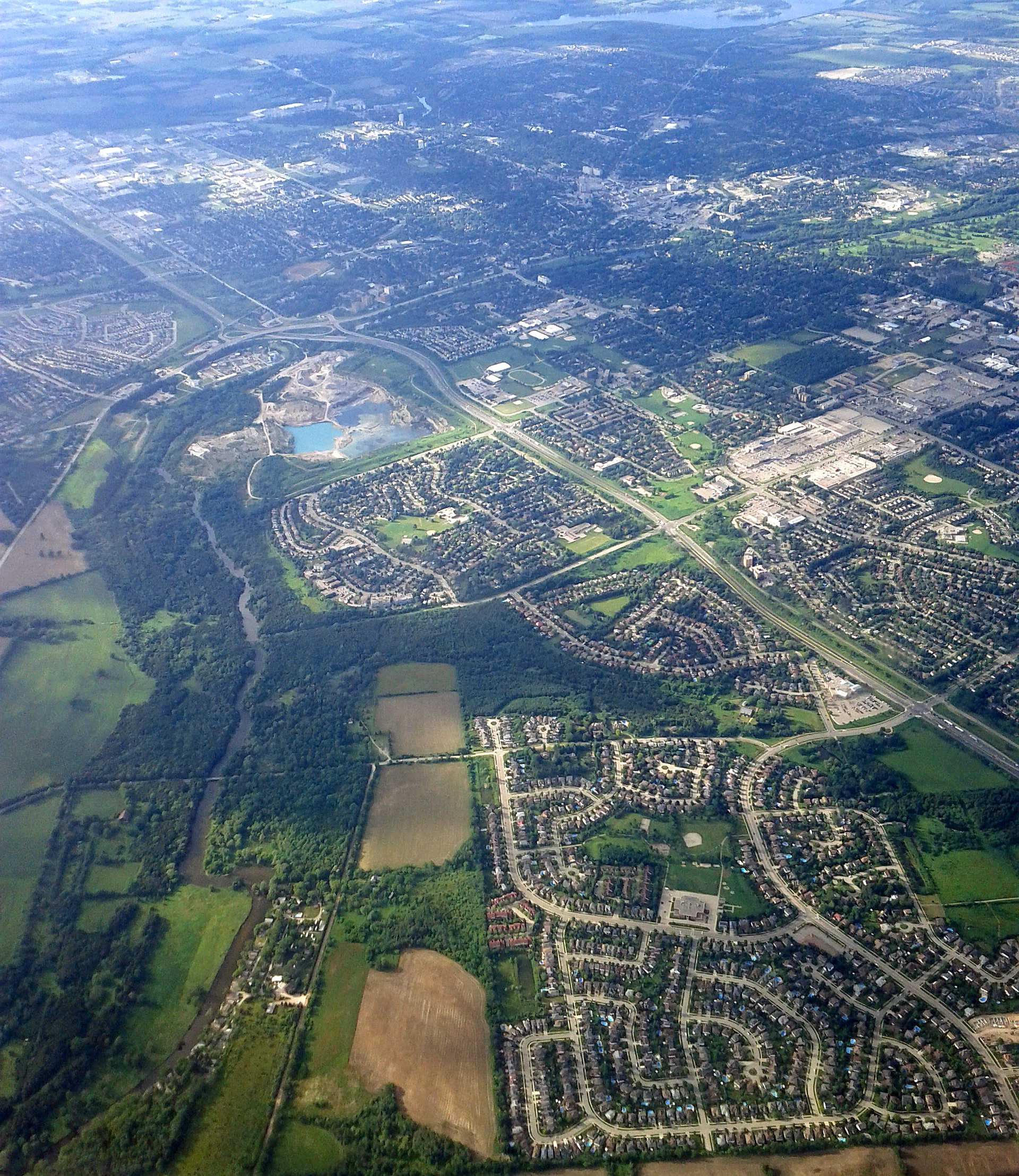
The Hanlon Expressway features at-grade intersections, with the exception of the Wellington Street and Laird Road interchanges, .

The Hanlon Expressway begins at a trumpet interchange with Highway 401 (from Highway 401 the on-ramps sign the Hanlon as "Highway 6 North", whereas the other section of Highway 6 along Brock Road is signed as "Highway 6 South"). The Hanlon Expressway cuts through several farms northward before curving slightly westward to follow along the west side of the right-of-way of Hanlon Road. The Hanlon is graded and landscaped similarly to a rural freeway, with broad flat shoulders and an open median.

It enters Guelph at Maltby Road, skirting the outskirts of urban development. At the Laird Road interchange, opened in late 2013, the expressway encounters the Hanlon Creek Business Park. As it progresses into residential subdivisions, the Hanlon Expressway encounters an at-grade intersection, with Downey Road travelling to the west and Kortright Road West to the east. Continuing north, the route crosses to the east side of the Hanlon Road right-of-way as it intersects Stone Road West to the west of the Stone Road Mall. Before crossing the Speed River, the expressway meets College Avenue West, an at-grade intersection at the southwest corner of Centennial Park Arena.

The Hanlon Expressway crosses the Speed River as it swerves to the west and meets Wellington Street, the only other interchange along the route. To the east, Wellington Road is Highway 7, which follows the Hanlon Expressway north from the interchange; to the west it was formerly Highway 24. North of the Wellington Road the expressway was built slightly west of what is now Silvercreek Parkway. It passes beneath the a line of the Goderich–Exeter Railway, a sideline of the Canadian Pacific Railway, before encountering three at-grade intersections: Paisley Road, Willow Road and Speedvale Avenue West. This section also features two at-grade rail crossings. Shortly thereafter, it ends at Woodlawn Road West; Highway 6 travels east from this point while Highway 7 travels west.

The road, like with nearby Hanlon Creek, is named after Felix Hanlon, one of the men who cut the first tree in Guelph along with John Galt. He was one of the original settlers in the area, and his family eventually deeded their land to the city.

== History ==
Prior to the construction of the Hanlon Expressway, Hanlon Road existed as far north as College Avenue. Edinburgh Road was the westernmost crossing of the Speed River. On the opposite side of the valley, Silvercreek Road continued, as it does today, along the same right-of-way as Hanlon Road.

At the time, the Highway 6 routing from Highway 401 to Guelph followed Brock Road which passed through the centre of the city. With the rapid suburban expansion of Guelph in the 1950s and 1960s, a revised transportation plan was conceived to handle the increasing traffic load. The Guelph Area Transportation Study was completed in 1967, and recommended a new controlled-access highway to allow through-traffic on Highway 6 to bypass the city. Route planning, engineering and design began on October 2, 1967 and was subsequently completed in 1969. Construction began between Waterloo Avenue and Stone Road in 1970; this section opened on June 28, 1972. The next section, from Stone Road to Clair Road, opened in October 1973. Work on the northern section from Waterloo Avenue to Woodlawn Road began in August 1974. That section, as well as the final section south to Highway 401 were opened on November 7, 1975. With the Hanlon assuming the Highway 6 routing, Brock Road north of Highway 401 was downloaded to municipal authorities where it was designated as Wellington Road 46.

For the next quarter century, the Hanlon remained as a limited controlled-access expressway as the right-of-way for grade separations and interchanges remained vacant.

=== Upgrades ===
The Ministry of Transportation of Ontario (MTO) has planned to upgrade the route to a freeway since at least 1994, when an environmental assessment (EA) for the expressway north of the Speed River was completed, in preparation for the construction of the Wellington Street interchange. The EA for the section south of the Speed River began in early 2007, with the Laird Road interchange and associated closing of the Clair Road intersection being among the first projects completed as part of this work.

Construction of the Wellington Avenue interchange began in October 1998; it opened in July 2001, connecting Wellington Street west of the expressway with the Silvercreek Parkway into downtown Guelph. The interchange cost C$13.2 million and opened a year later than expected due to a design flaw that resulted in several months of delay and a lawsuit against the MTO resulting in a budget overrun of C$3.2 million. No further work has been done north of the Speed River, and the 1994 EA now requires updating.

On April 30, 2012, construction began on the Laird Road interchange. It partially opened on the week of November 11, 2013, and was fully opened on November 29, 2013, in a public ceremony attended by local officials as well as Guelph MPP Liz Sandals.

A full interchange was constructed between Wellington County Road 34 and Maltby Road which opened in 2025. The intersections with both roads were then closed, with Wellington County Road 34 now crossing the expressway via a new overpass, while Maltby Road terminates at a cul-de-sac on both sides of the expressway.

== Future ==
As initially envisioned, the Hanlon Expressway will be upgraded to a controlled-access highway by removing all remaining at-grade intersections and improving the highway to 400-series standards.

Confirmed projects will transform the route into a freeway between Highway 401 and Wellington Street. A partial-access diamond interchange will be built at Downey Road / Kortright Road West, with ramps from the northbound lanes and to the southbound lanes and the crossroad run beneath the expressway. The lack of ramps on the north side is due to the proximity of Stone Road to the north, where a full interchange will be constructed. A service road will be constructed along the west side of the expressway connecting Downey Road and Stone Road to provide better access to the YMCA, which previous controversial plans had neglected. At College Road, an underpass will be built.

The Government of Ontario has announced plans to build a new Highway 7 freeway bypass joining the current northern terminus of the Hanlon Expressway to the Conestoga Parkway in Kitchener. In line with this project, the entire Hanlon Expressway will be fully upgraded to 400-series freeway standards.

Long-term plans call for Highway 6 to be rerouted along a potential extension of the Hanlon south of Highway 401 to meet the four lane segment of Highway 6 south of Freelton. This would bypass the congested two-lane section of Highway 6 (also known as Brock Road, signed as Highway 6 South) in Wellington County from Puslinch to Morriston which runs through several small towns where it lacks sufficient right-of-way for widening. As a prerequisite, Highway 401 will be widened from six lanes to ten lanes between the Hanlon and the proposed Highway 6 bypass of Puslinch.[https://highways6and401hamiltontoguelph.ca/]

== Major intersections ==
The following table lists the major junctions along Hanlon Expressway, as noted by the Ministry of Transportation of Ontario.

Division	Location	km	mi	Destinations	Notes
Wellington	Puslinch	0.0	0.0	Highway 401 – London, Toronto; Highway 6 south – Hamilton	Exit 295; Highway 6 travels east concurrently with Highway 401 to Exit 299.
Wellington	Puslinch	1.1	0.68	County Road 34	Signalized intersection replaced with an overpass
Wellington	Puslinch	2.1	1.3	County Road 53 (Midblock Interchange)	New interchange opened August 12, 2024
Wellington	Puslinch	3.1	1.9	Concession Road 4 Maltby Road West	Closed with opening of Midblock Interchange
Guelph		5.1	3.2	Clair Road West; Phelan Drive	Closed with opening of Laird Road Interchange
Guelph		5.7	3.5	Laird Road	Grade-separated as of November 29, 2013
Guelph		8.2	5.1	Downey Road (west); Kortright Road West (east)	
Guelph		9.2	5.7	Stone Road West	
Guelph		10.1	6.3	College Avenue West	
Guelph		11.7	7.3	Highway 7 east (Wellington Street) – Brampton	Southern end of Highway 7 concurrency; grade-separated as of July 2001; formerly Highway 24
Guelph		12.7	7.9	Paisley Road	
Guelph		13.5	8.4	Willow Road	
Guelph		14.4	8.9	Speedvale Avenue West	
Guelph		15.4	9.6	Highway 6 north / Highway 7 west (Woodlawn Road West) – Owen Sound, Fergus, Waterloo	Highway 6 continues eastward along Woodlawn Road West; Highway 7 continues westward
1.000 mi = 1.609 km; 1.000 km = 0.621 mi: Closed/former; Concurrency terminus; Unopened
