= Langford, Ontario =

Langford
- Dispersed rural community
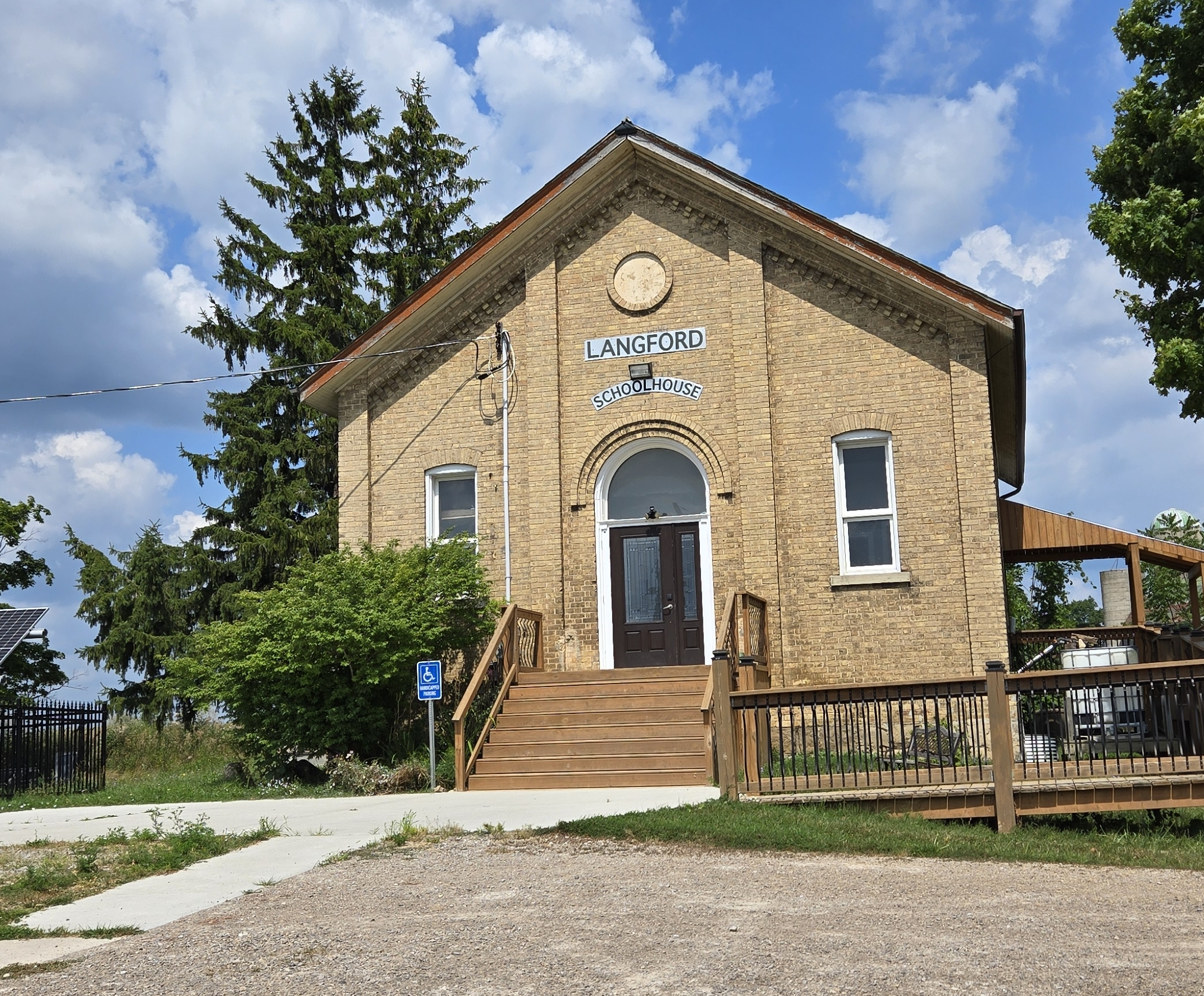
- Langford School

- Location within County of Brant Location within Southern Ontario
- Coordinates: 43°10′12″N 80°07′49″W
- Country: Canada
- Province: Ontario
- Municipality: County of Brant
- Time zone: UTC-5 (Eastern (EST))
  - Summer (DST): UTC-4 (EDT)
- GNBC Code: FBWFK

Langford is a dispersed rural community the County of Brant, Ontario, Canada.

== History ==
Jacob Langs and his family were early settlers who arrived from Pennsylvania in 1810, and purchased 297 acres (120 ha) of farmland. That same year, a road from Hamilton to London was built through the settlement, which was called "Langs'ford", because travellers needed to ford a swampy stream east of Langs' farm. "Langs'ford" was the name first used by the post office, and later changed to "Langford". Daily stagecoach service between Ancaster and Brantford—passing through Langford—began in 1829, and a church was erected in 1868 called New Plank Road Wesleyan Methodist Church, because wooden planks covered the muddy road through the community.

The population in 1883 was approximately 200.

The early settlement contained a blacksmith shop, brickyard, general store, a "long and straggling row of houses" fronting on the road, and a school called Langford School, established in 1886.
