= Jerseyville, Ontario =

Jerseyville Formerly known as: Jersey Settlement
- Dispersed Rural Community
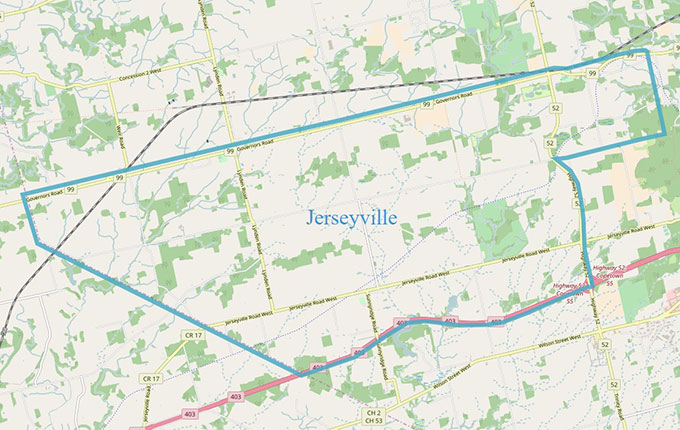

- Location of Jerseyville Jerseyville (Canada)
- Coordinates: 43°11′57″N 80°06′22″W
- Country: Canada
- Province: Ontario
- Region: Southern Ontario

Jerseyville is a dispersed rural community within the city of Hamilton, in Ontario, Canada. The community was initially known as Jersey Settlement, named by the United Empire Loyalist settlers from New Jersey who settled in the late 1790s, but was changed to its present name in 1852 when a post office was opened.

Formerly an elementary school, general store, post office, train station and a motorcycle dealership.

Jerseyville's former elementary school is currently home to Circus Orange.

The Brantford to Hamilton rail trail passes through Jerseyville in place of the old train tracks. The original Jerseyville train station building can be found at Westfield Heritage Village in Rockton.

== Current ==
=== Churches ===
Jerseyville supports two churches, Jerseyville United Church and Jerseyville Baptist Church.

==== Jerseyville United Church ====
Jerseyville United Church's congregation was founded in 1801. The church has been at the present building,16 Field Road, since 1860.

== Climate ==
Climate data for Hamilton (John C. Munro Hamilton International Airport) WMO ID: 71263; coordinates: 43°10′18″N 79°56′03″W; elevation: 237.7 m (780 ft); 1991−2020 normals, extremes 1959–present
Month	Jan	Feb	Mar	Apr	May	Jun	Jul	Aug	Sep	Oct	Nov	Dec	Year
Record high humidex	17.6	18.5	27.7	33.4	40.5	44.4	49.1	47.6	42.1	37.7	26.6	24.5	49.1
Record high °C (°F)	16.7 (62.1)	17.9 (64.2)	26.8 (80.2)	29.7 (85.5)	33.1 (91.6)	35.0 (95.0)	37.4 (99.3)	36.4 (97.5)	34.4 (93.9)	30.3 (86.5)	24.4 (75.9)	20.7 (69.3)	37.4 (99.3)
Mean maximum °C (°F)	10.4 (50.7)	9.5 (49.1)	16.9 (62.4)	23.7 (74.7)	28.9 (84.0)	31.5 (88.7)	32.2 (90.0)	31.1 (88.0)	29.9 (85.8)	24.6 (76.3)	17.5 (63.5)	11.7 (53.1)	33.3 (91.9)
Mean daily maximum °C (°F)	−1.4 (29.5)	−0.9 (30.4)	4.7 (40.5)	11.8 (53.2)	18.9 (66.0)	24.2 (75.6)	26.6 (79.9)	25.6 (78.1)	21.7 (71.1)	14.5 (58.1)	7.7 (45.9)	1.5 (34.7)	12.9 (55.2)
Daily mean °C (°F)	−5.3 (22.5)	−5 (23)	0.2 (32.4)	6.5 (43.7)	13.1 (55.6)	18.5 (65.3)	20.9 (69.6)	20.1 (68.2)	16.1 (61.0)	9.7 (49.5)	3.8 (38.8)	−1.9 (28.6)	8.1 (46.6)
Mean daily minimum °C (°F)	−9.1 (15.6)	−9.2 (15.4)	−4.4 (24.1)	1.3 (34.3)	7.3 (45.1)	12.8 (55.0)	15.2 (59.4)	14.5 (58.1)	10.5 (50.9)	4.8 (40.6)	−0.2 (31.6)	−5.4 (22.3)	3.2 (37.8)
Mean minimum °C (°F)	−20.2 (−4.4)	−19.5 (−3.1)	−14.8 (5.4)	−5.7 (21.7)	0.4 (32.7)	5.8 (42.4)	9.3 (48.7)	8.6 (47.5)	3.0 (37.4)	−2.8 (27.0)	−8.4 (16.9)	−15.1 (4.8)	−22.4 (−8.3)
Record low °C (°F)	−30.0 (−22.0)	−29.1 (−20.4)	−24.6 (−12.3)	−12.8 (9.0)	−3.9 (25.0)	1.1 (34.0)	5.6 (42.1)	1.1 (34.0)	−2.2 (28.0)	−7.8 (18.0)	−19.3 (−2.7)	−26.8 (−16.2)	−30.0 (−22.0)
Record low wind chill	−43.0	−37.0	−30.7	−22.5	−8.0	0.0	0.0	0.0	−4.6	−10.9	−22.8	−33.9	−43.0
Average precipitation mm (inches)	72.9 (2.87)	53.4 (2.10)	68.7 (2.70)	81.3 (3.20)	81.0 (3.19)	77.6 (3.06)	97.5 (3.84)	66.8 (2.63)	73.5 (2.89)	84.2 (3.31)	78.1 (3.07)	67.3 (2.65)	902.3 (35.52)
Average rainfall mm (inches)	36.4 (1.43)	24.5 (0.96)	43.9 (1.73)	73.0 (2.87)	81.0 (3.19)	78.1 (3.07)	97.5 (3.84)	65.5 (2.58)	73.6 (2.90)	83.2 (3.28)	67.7 (2.67)	40.2 (1.58)	764.6 (30.10)
Average snowfall cm (inches)	40.8 (16.1)	35.1 (13.8)	26.5 (10.4)	8.4 (3.3)	0.5 (0.2)	0.0 (0.0)	0.0 (0.0)	0.0 (0.0)	0.0 (0.0)	0.7 (0.3)	11.0 (4.3)	33.5 (13.2)	156.5 (61.6)
Average precipitation days (≥ 0.2 mm)	17.1	13.6	12.9	12.6	12.8	10.7	11.5	10.2	9.8	12.4	13.5	15.4	152.4
Average rainy days (≥ 0.2 mm)	5.9	4.1	7.5	11.4	12.8	10.6	11.5	10.1	9.8	12.3	10.4	7.9	114.2
Average snowy days (≥ 0.2 cm)	14.5	11.6	8.1	2.7	0.10	0.0	0.0	0.0	0.0	0.43	4.8	12.0	54.2
Average relative humidity (%) (at 15:00)	75.1	70.7	65.1	59.6	57.1	57.7	57.5	60.5	61.3	65.3	71.5	75.6	64.8
Average dew point °C (°F)	−7.9 (17.8)	−7.7 (18.1)	−4.2 (24.4)	0.7 (33.3)	7.4 (45.3)	13.1 (55.6)	15.8 (60.4)	15.7 (60.3)	12.2 (54.0)	6.2 (43.2)	0.5 (32.9)	−4.3 (24.3)	4.0 (39.2)
Source 1: Environment and Climate Change Canada (snowfall 1981–2010)
Source 2: weatherstats.ca (for dewpoint and monthly&yearly average absolute maximum&minimum temperature)

== See also ==
Places named after the Channel Islands
