= Hamilton Conservation Authority =

Conservation authority in Ontario, Canada

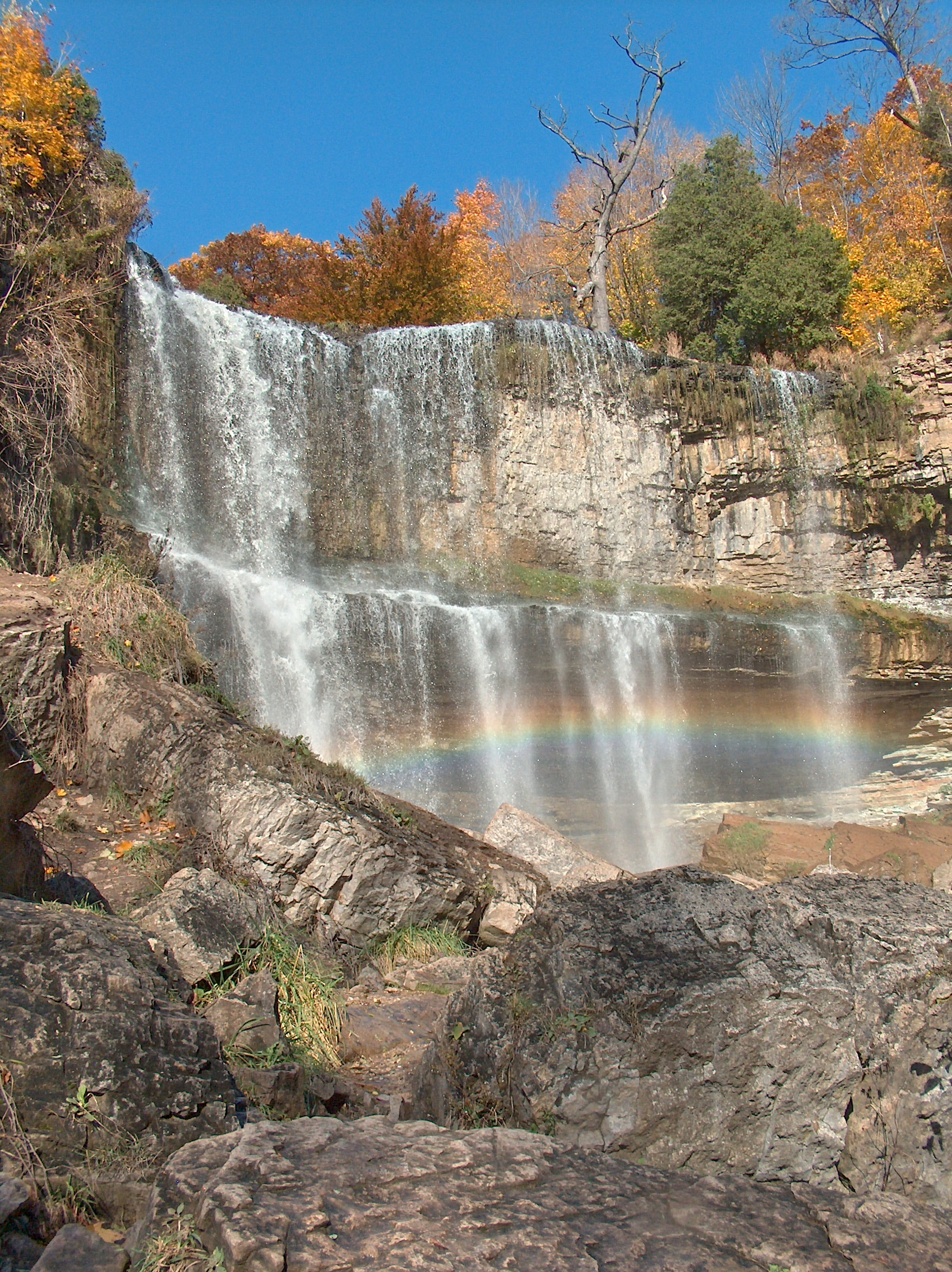
Below Webster's Falls

The Hamilton Conservation Authority maintains the greenspace, trails, parks and some attractions in Hamilton, Ontario, Canada.

The Hamilton Conservation Authority (HCA) has managed the natural environment in partnership with the City of Hamilton and the Province of Ontario to help ensure a safe and sustainable community. As one of 36 conservation authorities in the province, HCA protects water sources, guards against flooding and erosion, manages conservation and recreational lands, and promotes environmental stewardship and education.

The Authority is the region's largest environmental management agency, owning or managing about 4.000 hectares (10,000 acres) of environmentally significant land. Its recreational lands range from long distance trails and relatively passive natural areas, such as the Dundas Valley, Christie Lake and Valens conservation areas, to more developed sites on the lakefront, like Confederation Beach Park and Fifty Point Conservation Area and Marina.

== Parks and conservation areas ==
- Christie Lake Conservation Area
- Confederation Beach Park
- Devil's Punchbowl Conservation Area
- Dundas Valley Conservation Area
- Eramosa Karst Conservation Area
- Felker's Falls Conservation Area
- Fifty Point Conservation Area
- Fletcher Creek Ecological Preserve
- Spencer Gorge Conservation Area
- Tiffany Falls Conservation Area
- Valens Lake Conservation Area

== Attractions ==
- Crooks' Hollow
- Griffin House (Ancaster, Ontario)
- Westfield Heritage Village
- Wild Waterworks

== Waterfalls ==
- Albion Falls
- Baby Webster's Falls
- Borer's Falls
- Buttermilk Falls
- Canterbury Falls
- Darnley Cascade
- Dundas Falls
- Felker's Falls
- Filman Falls
- Great Falls
- Grindstone Cascade
- Hermitage Cascade
- Jones Road Falls
- Little Davis Falls
- Lower Cliffview Falls
- Lower Mills Falls
- Lower Punchbowl Falls
- Lower Sydenham Falls
- Lower Westcliffe Falls
- Middle Sydenham Falls
- Mill Falls
- Mineral Springs Falls
- Mountview Falls
- Princess Falls
- Scenic Falls
- Sherman Falls
- Sydenham Falls
- Tew's Falls
- Tiffany Falls
- Vinemount Middle Falls
- West Vinemount Falls
- Webster's Falls

== See also ==
- List of waterfalls in Hamilton, Ontario
- Toronto and Region Conservation Authority
- Grand River Conservation Authority
- Parks Canada
- Ontario Parks
