= Darnley Cascade =

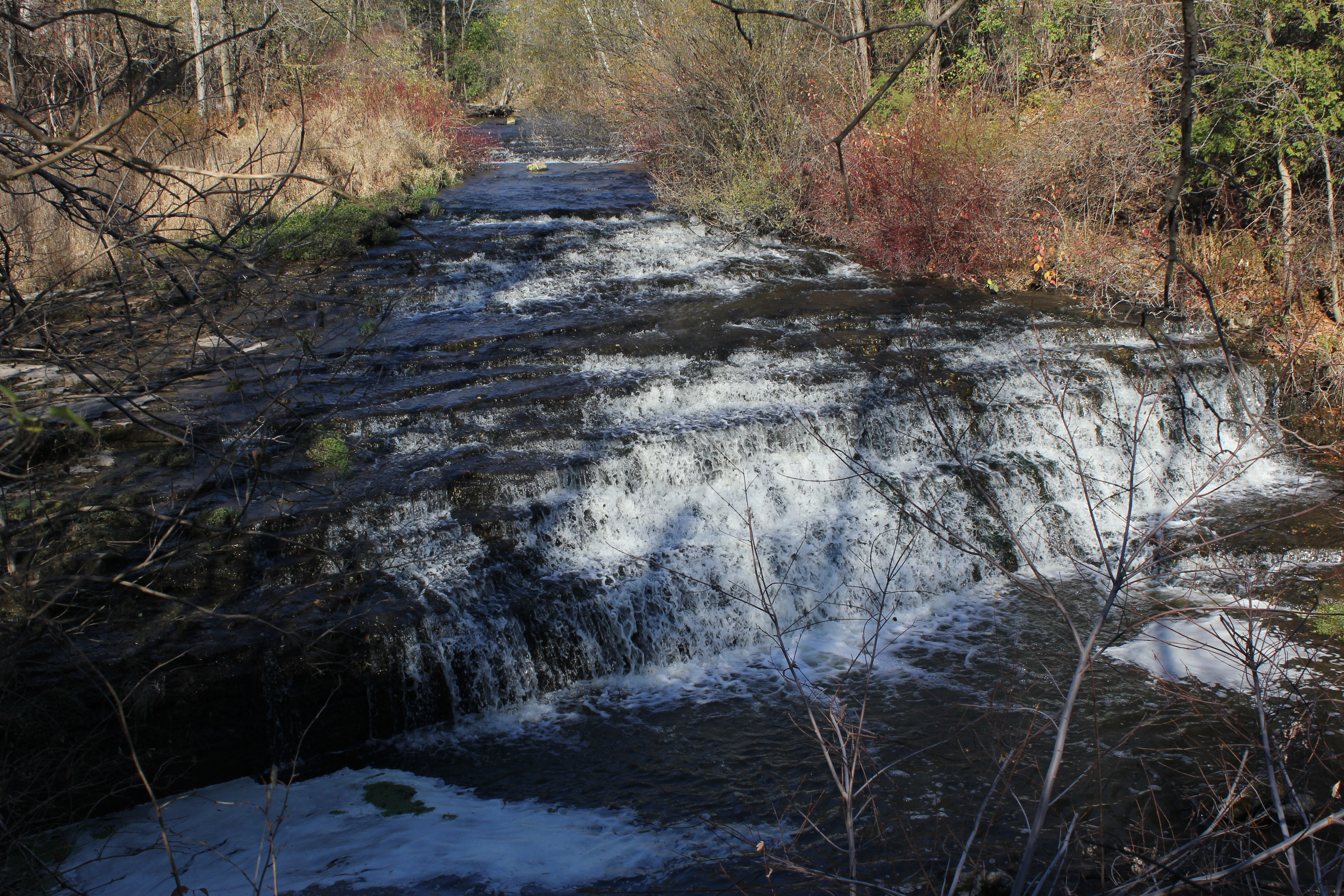
- Darnley Cascade
- Interactive map of Darnley Cascade
- Location: Hamilton, Ontario
- Coordinates: 43.27648°N 80.00685°W
- Type: Cascade
- Total height: 4 m (13 ft)
- Total width: 22 m (72 ft)
- Watercourse: Spencer Creek

Darnley Cascade is a 4-metre-high (13 ft) cascade waterfall located at Crooks Hollow Conservation Area in Greensville, Hamilton, Ontario, Canada. Nearby attractions include Bruce Trail, Dundas Valley Conservation Area, Spencer Gorge/Webster's Falls Conservation Area, Hermitage ruins, Royal Botanical Gardens, Dundurn Castle, Christie Lake Conservation Area, Dundas Historical Society Museum and Carnegie Gallery.

The waterfall got its name from the Darnley Grist Mill, completed in 1813 by Scottish settler James Crooks, who admired Lord Darnley and claimed him as an ancestor. The grist mill was sold to James Stutt after Crooks' death in 1860. Darnley Cascade is sometimes referred to as Stutt's Falls, a name which is used on vintage postcards of the area. The mill burned down in 1934, but the ruins remain.

An article published in November 2020 states that the Darnley mill was expanded in 1829 to include "a distillery, a linseed oil mill, a cooperage, a card clothing factory, a fulling and drying works, a tannery, a woollen mill, a foundry, an agricultural implement factory and Upper Canada’s first paper mill". The community also grew in that era, with a general store and inn; residents lived along the valley road. Today, the site "is considered to be one of Ontario’s oldest ruins and is just one of the remains of the early industrial empire of James Crooks and of the community which became Crooks Hollow".

Another nearby mill which was destroyed by fire in 1875, also built by James Crooks, is considered to have been "Upper Canada's First Paper Mill (1826)".

== Directions ==
According to the Hamilton Waterfalls web site, the cascade and the grist mill ruin is not difficult to find.

From Highway 403 take Highway 6 North (Guelph) exit and travel approximately 3 km to Hwy 5 E. (Dundas St. E.). Turn left on Hwy 5 E. and then turn left onto Ofield Rd. S. Turn right onto Harvest Rd., Harvest Rd. will become Crooks Hollow Rd. Park on the right, past the Spencer Creek bridge, at the Darnley Mill ruins.

== See also ==
- List of waterfalls
