= Griffin House (Ancaster, Ontario) =

19th-century house and museum, site along the Underground Railroad

Coordinates: 43.2361°N 80.0004°W

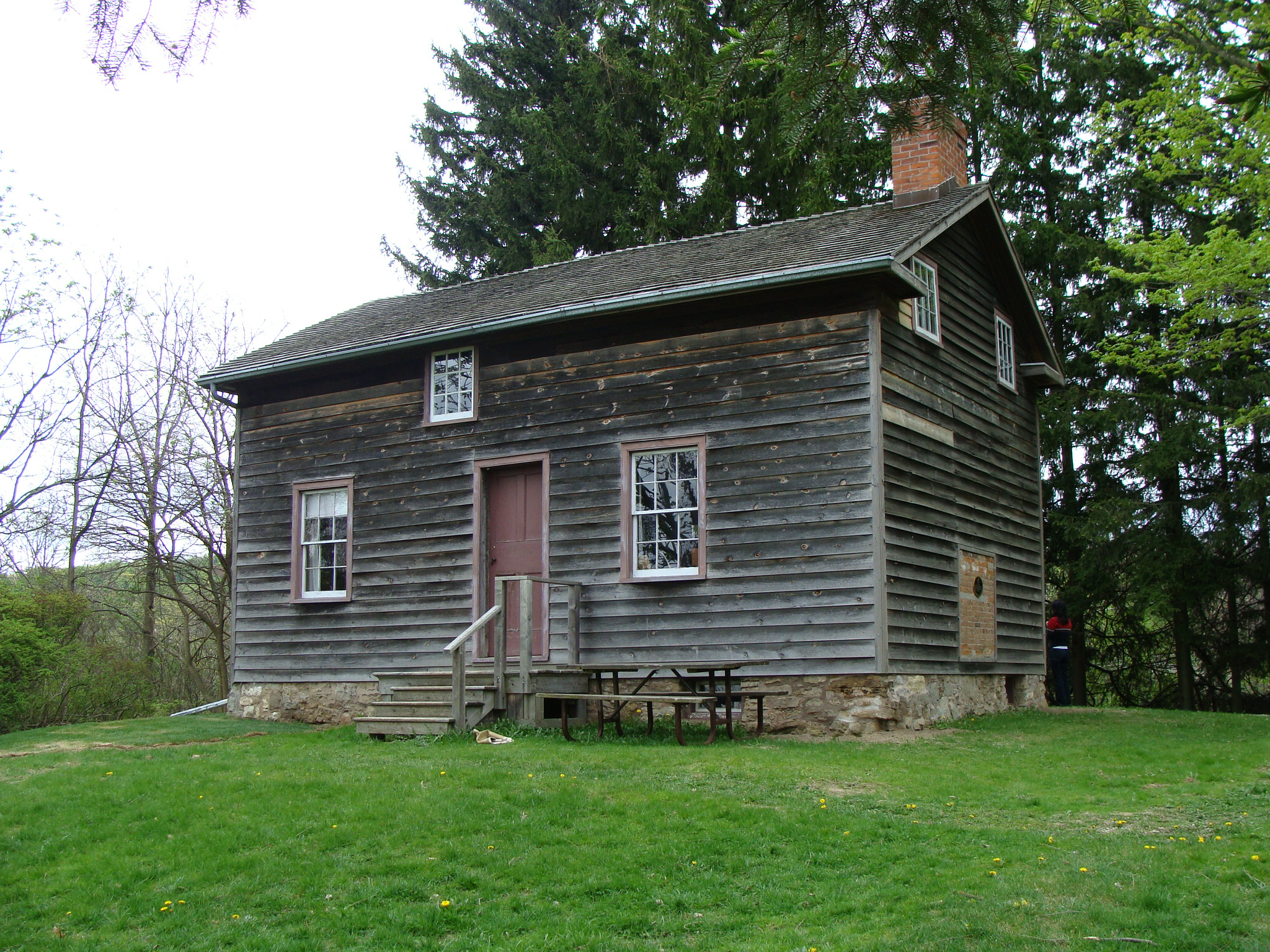
- Griffin House in 2010
- Location: Hamilton, Ontario, Canada
- Built: 1827; 198 years ago hamilton.ca
- Original use: House
- Current use: House museum
- Governing body: Hamilton Conservation Authority

National Historic Site of Canada
- Designated: 2007

Griffin House is a house built in 1827 by Englishmen in Ancaster. It was purchased, along with 50 acres of farmland, by Enerals Griffin and his wife Priscilla in 1834. The Griffins were enslaved in their early lives, but self-liberated by escaping to Canada in the early 1800s. The Griffins were some of the first black settlers in the area, and the site remains an important part of black history in Canada. It offers Underground Railroad tours and history-related programs.

Griffin House was designated as a National Historic Site of Canada in 2008. The house is a rare surviving example of a four-room house typical in Upper Canada in the early 19th century. It was owned by Enerals Griffin, a formerly enslaved African American man from Virginia who escaped to Canada in 1834. The house is a one and a half storey house located just above the Dundas Valley in Ancaster, which is now the City of Hamilton. The Griffin House has a 19th century inspired design, imitating a typical Georgian architecture style home.

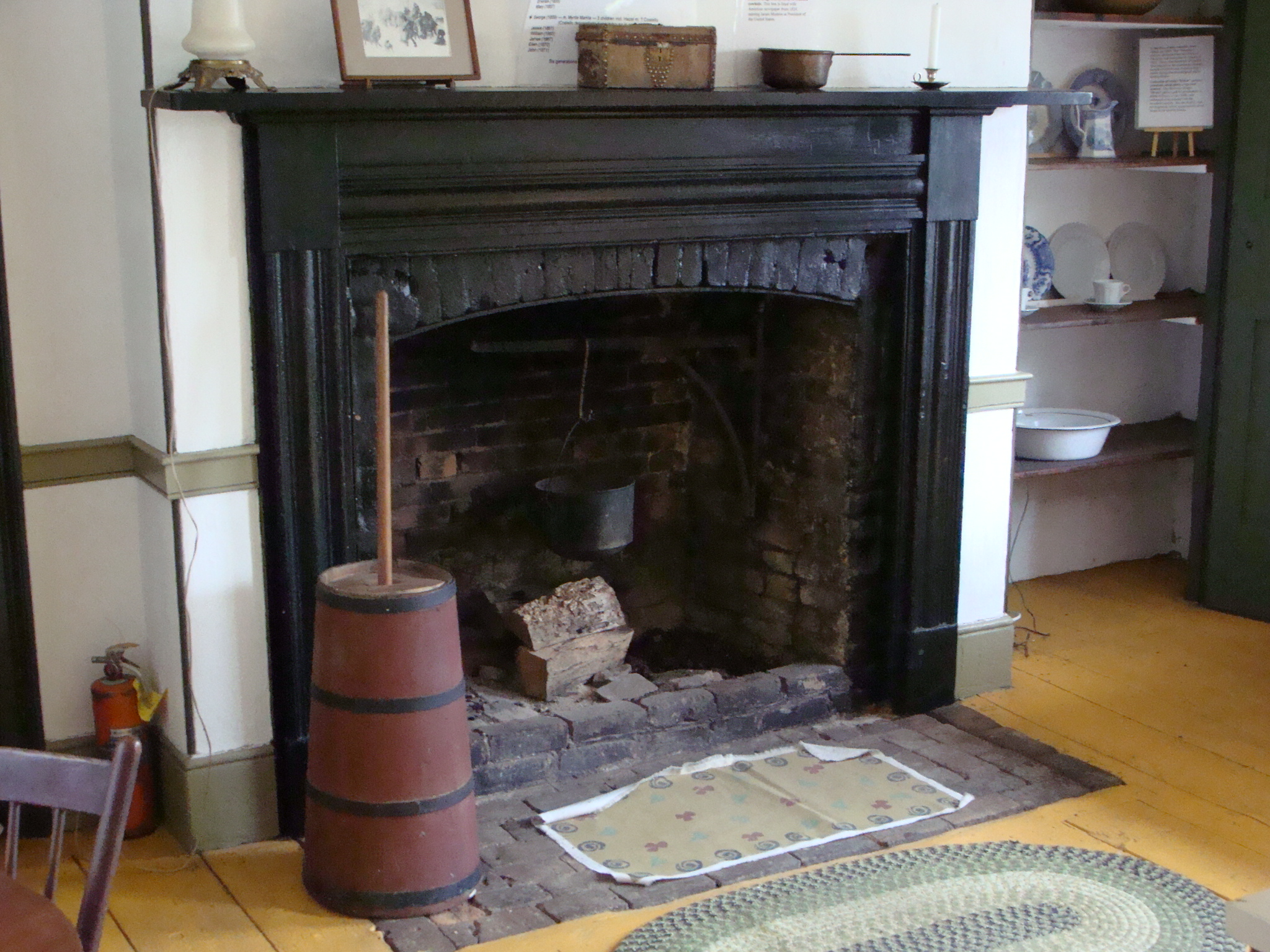
Griffin House interior

For the next 150 years, their descendants lived and farmed here atop a hill in peace. The property was sold to the Hamilton Region Conservation Authority in 1988, and was restored to its original 19th century appearance. The home was restored between 1992 and 1994. Over 3,000 artefacts were discovered during that period. The museum in the home is operated as a joint project between the Hamilton Conservation Authority and Fieldcote Memorial Park and Museum. Public visitation and interpretation is offered. The waterfalls, Heritage Falls or Griffin Falls, behind the museum, is also a tourist attraction operated by the Conservation Authority.

== Conflicts with the Griffin House Project ==
The Griffin House was sold to the Hamilton Region Conservation Authority (HRCA) in 1988 by a Griffin descendant named Bernard Griffin-Costello. Originally, there had been ideas circulating to convert the house into a private residence, but the HRCA expressed their plans of turning the house into a heritage site and as a place to interpret African Canadian history. By 1991, Ancaster's Local Architectural Conservation Advisory Committee (LACAC) deemed the Griffin House as a notable heritage site. Although, despite the positive attention that the site was gaining, controversy had followed in the years to follow.

Despite the project being approved, the restoration project received opposition from some members of the Ancaster community. This included worries over how expensive the project would be, the tourist crowds and traffic it could create, possible bus tours, noise and the construction of the parking lot on rural land. However, the HRCA continued with their plans to preserve and restore the Griffin House.

In November 1993, it was finally decided that restoration would continue after meetings between the LACAC, Hamilton's black community and other residents from Ancaster. However, the funding for the project had been dramatically reduced to 40 000, despite the original 70 000 that was granted to the HRCA by the Ontario Ministry of Culture, Tourism and Recreation. Some community members attributed the funding cuts with racism and attempts to erase the importance of local African Canadian history.

Despite the issues surrounding the Griffin House, the HRCA had carried on with the project and involved the local Black community, such as the Stewart Memorial Church to help to further enhance the house's interpretation of African Canadian history. To further help with research on African Canadian history in this local community, an informal advisory committee (including staff and volunteers from the Fieldcote Memorial Park and Museum and the HRCA ) was created to enhance research efforts.

The Griffin House officially opened to the public in February 1995. The exhibit within the home focuses on the Griffins family and the history of their farm between 1830-1988, Black settlement in Hamilton-Wentworth relating to employment, education, religion and more. The Griffin House continues to be a significant interpretation of African Canadian history.

== 21st Century Restoration ==
In Fall of 2022 a multiyear restoration project began on Griffin House, expected to be completed by the end of 2024. The project has received an investment of $999,000 from municipal, provincial, and federal government sources. Once completed, updates will include a restored foundation, exterior, porches, ramp and pathway.
