= Devil's Punch Bowl (Hamilton, Ontario) =

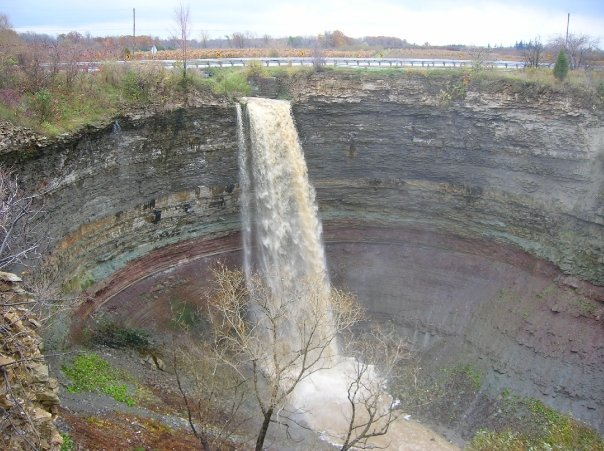
- Devil's Punch Bowl
- Interactive map of Devil's Punch Bowl
- Location: Hamilton, Ontario
- Coordinates: 43.2104°N 79.7558°W
- Type: Ribbon waterfall
- Total height: 37 m (121 ft)
- Number of drops
- Total width: 11 m (36 ft)
- Watercourse: Stoney Creek

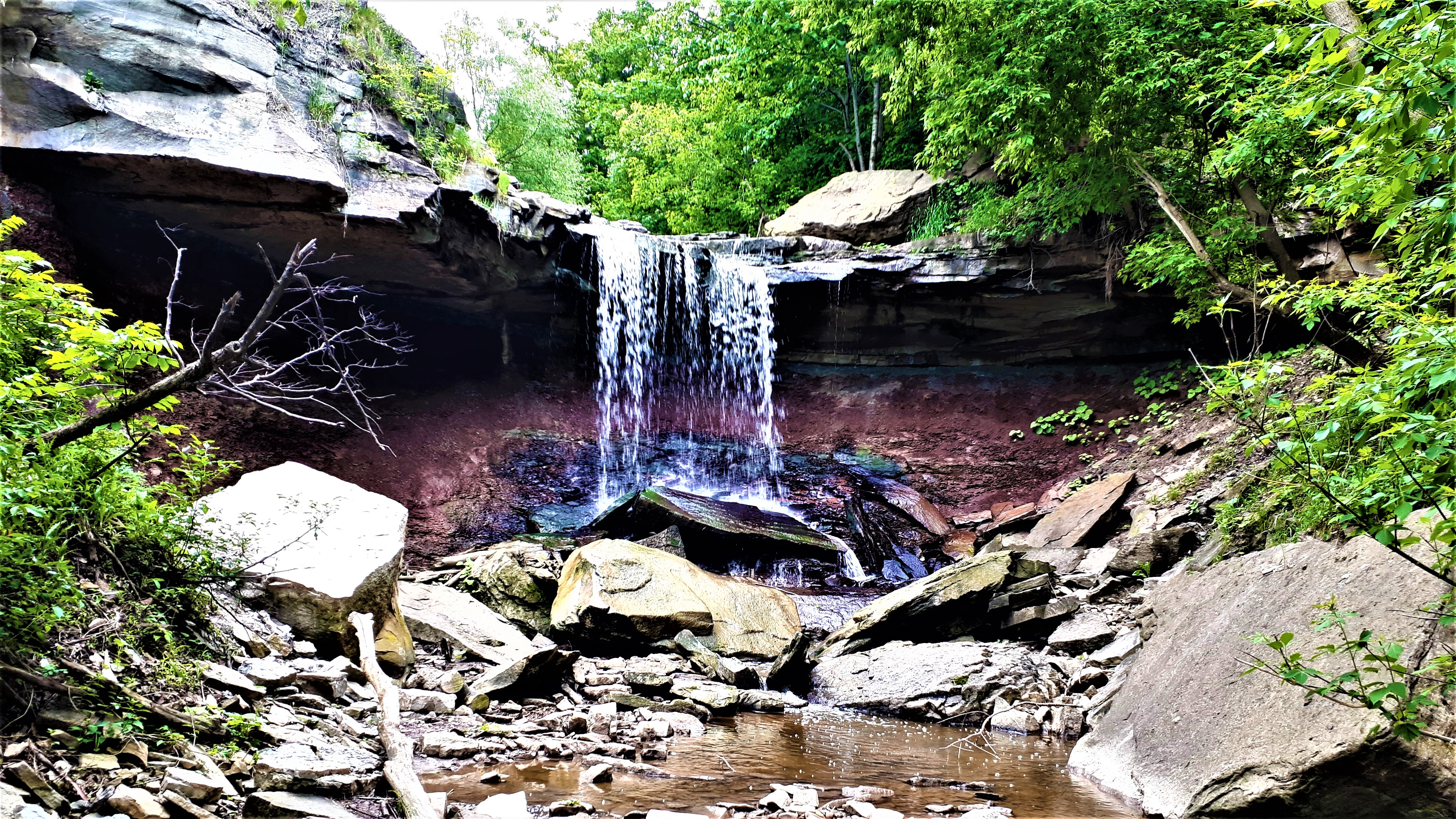
Lower Falls

Devil's Punch Bowl is a 37-metre ribbon waterfall on the Niagara Escarpment, in the Stoney Creek community of Hamilton, Ontario, Canada. It is in the Devil's Punchbowl Conservation Area maintained by the Hamilton Conservation Authority, and features an escarpment access trail with connections to a section of the Bruce Trail. Stoney Creek's Dofasco 2000 Trail is nearby. The Punch Bowl is also known as Horseshoe Falls for the distinctive shape of the cliff-face, which somewhat resembles its much larger cousin in Niagara Falls.

In addition to the 800 km-long Bruce Trail, attractions close to the Falls include the historic Battlefield House Museum and Nash-Jackson House; on Lake Ontario, Fifty Point Conservation Area and Confederation Park; and Mohawk Sports Park and the Hamilton Museum of Steam and Technology in the city proper. A restaurant, a motel, a gas station, a convenience store and other retail stores are also nearby.

Lower Punch Bowl Falls is a curtain waterfall located a few metres north of the Punch Bowl, spanning 7 metres in height and width.

== History ==
The history of the Devil's Punch Bowl dates back to over 450 million years ago. It was formed throughout the years by many glacial waters; it withholds different layers of colourful stratified rock segments. The falls drops about 108.25 feet. Another monument that is considered part of the Devil's Punch Bowl is the ten-metre high cross that overlooks the Stoney Creek community and Hamilton Harbour. This cross was made on December 18, 1966, by William Sinclair (1925-1994). He built the cross to bring light to the community. Originally the cross was only planned on being lit up during Christmas, and Easter for six weeks. However, with the help of the donations from the Knights of Columbus the cross lights up automatically every night. In 2021 a 31 year-old man jumped into the hole and died.

== Geology and geography ==
The Devil's Punch Bowl originated 450 million years ago when materials that form the Niagara escarpment were originally deposited in an inland sea. Corals and other organisms that lived in the area became fossilized as the sea bottom deposits changed into rocks.

The formation of the Devil's Punch Bowl occurred 1 million years ago after one of the four great ice ages. As the ice slabs that covered the area melted at the end of the ice age, high levels of water occurred. These streams of fast moving waters carved out the land and formed what would become the Devil's Punch Bowl. Formation of the Devil's Punch Bowl has declined since its original shaping; the falls often dry up or only trickle. However, the stream still picks up during rain and as snow is melting. The site also has two distinct waterfalls in the upper and lower regions.

Today it has become a famous landmark amongst geologists worldwide because of its exposed rock strata. The stratigraphy of the Punch Bowl has been studied by geologists, including McMaster University students.

A view from the top of the escarpment of various locations can be seen such as; East Hamilton, Burlington, Stoney Creek and weather permitting, the Toronto skyline can become visible as well.

The geology of the upper and lower falls was described in the popular Toronto blog "Hiking the GTA" in Dec. 2015.

== Entertainment ==
Devil's Punch Bowl has been used as a location for movies, television shows, and attractions. The 2006 film Silent Hill, opens with a young girl trying to jump off a cliff, which was the edge of the Devil's Punch Bowl overlooking the waterfall and rock bottom below. In the film, The Big Hit (1998), scenes filmed in the area highlight the waterfall and the surrounding area. In 1989 Super Dave Osborne performed a human yo-yo stunt at the Devil's Punch Bowl.

== See also ==
- List of waterfalls
- List of waterfalls in Hamilton, Ontario
- Bruce Trail
