= List of waterfalls in Hamilton, Ontario =

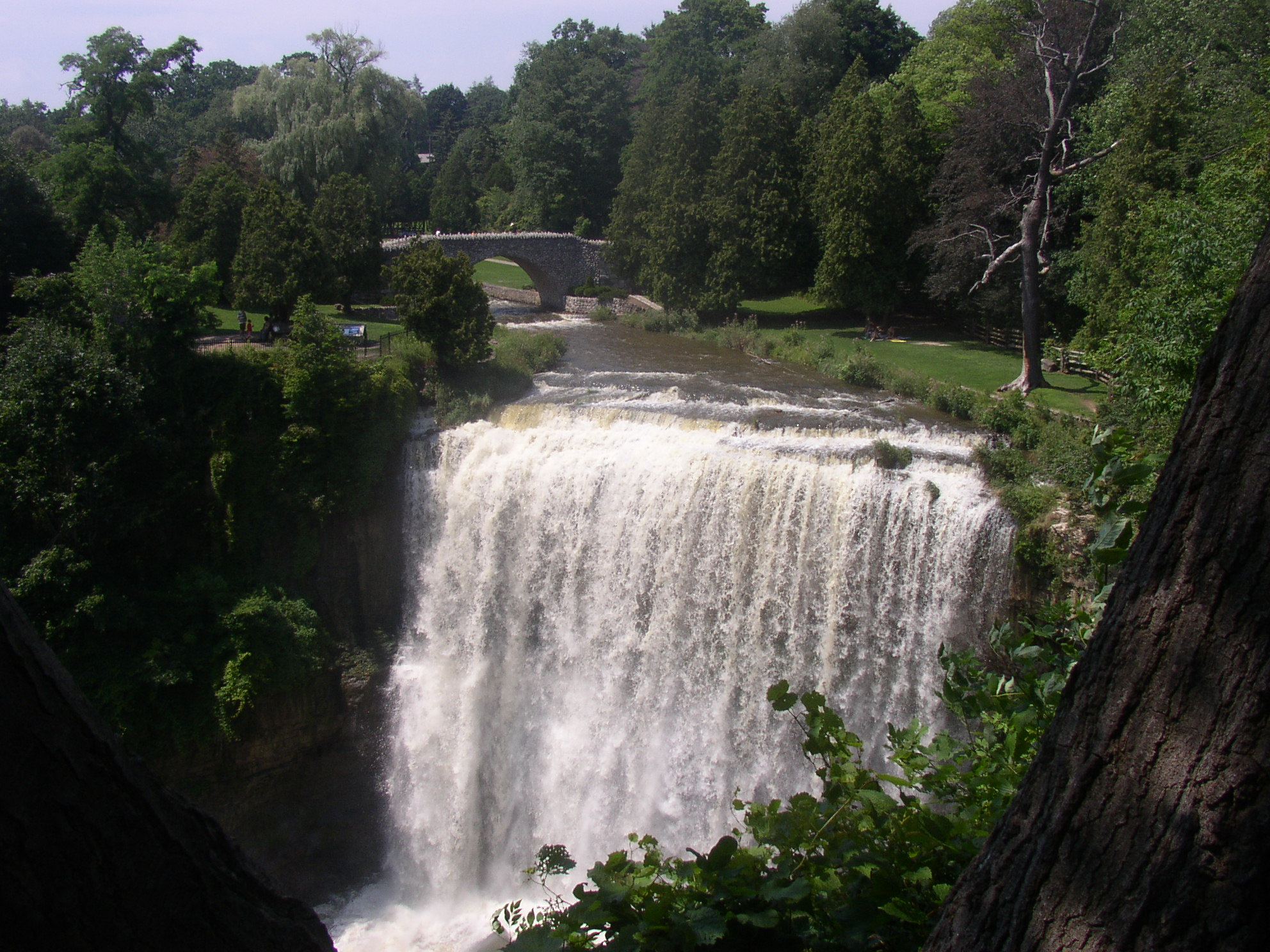
Webster's Falls

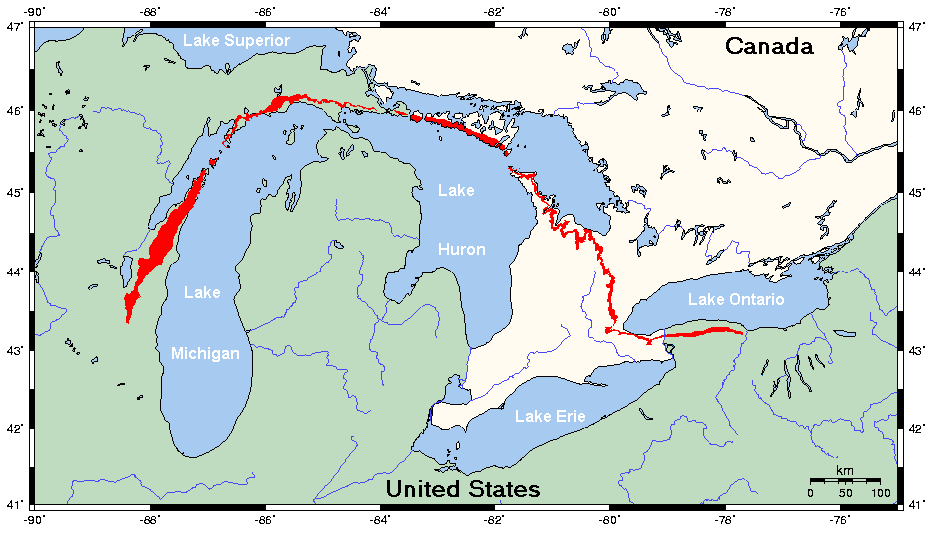
Niagara Escarpment (in red)

The city of Hamilton in Ontario, Canada is home to more than 100 waterfalls and cascades, most of which are on or near the Bruce Trail as it winds through the Niagara Escarpment. Ontario's internationally recognized Niagara Escarpment provides perfect geological conditions for waterfalls to occur, from Tobermory to Niagara Falls.

With its 30 metres (98 ft) crest, Webster's Falls is the largest waterfall within the city. Tew's Falls is a 41 metres (135 ft) ribbon waterfall, and is the tallest waterfall found in Hamilton. Both Webster's and Tew's Falls are located at the Spencer Gorge / Webster's Falls Conservation Area. Albion Falls was once seriously considered as a possible source of water for Hamilton. Rocks from the Albion Falls area were used in the construction of the Royal Botanical Gardens' Rock Garden.

There used to be more waterfalls in Hamilton than exist today. Many of the waterfalls in central Hamilton slowly vanished as population and construction on Hamilton Mountain increased. As well, in the early years, James Street extended south, but was interrupted by a bog at Hunter Street which eventually (1844) was drained out and graded. Many of Hamilton's main buildings and factories in the north end are built on reclaimed or infilled land, which harmed the drainage of Hamilton and the water ecology of Hamilton Harbour.

Many of the falls in west Hamilton are accessible from the Chedoke Radial Trail. It is built on what was once the route for the Brantford and Hamilton Electric Railway owned by the Cataract Power Light and Traction Company (later Dominion Power and Transmission). The "Five Johns", (John Cameron, John Dickenson (Canadian politician), John Morison Gibson, John Moodie Sr. and John Sutherland), formed The Cataract Power Co. Ltd. introducing electric power to Hamilton in 1898. On August 25, 1898, power was sent twenty seven miles from DeCew Falls, St. Catharines, using water from the old Welland Canal. New industries, such as the forerunners of the Steel Co. of Canada (Stelco) and Canadian Westinghouse, were attracted here by the cheaper, more efficient power. One time this Company controlled hydro power from Brantford to St. Catharines, including the Hamilton Street Railway and the area's radial lines. Back then the city's nickname was "The Electric City."

There are four waterfall types and they are designated as follows:

- Ribbon – height is notably greater than its crest width; stream forms a thin ribbon of water.
- Classical – height and crest width are nearly equal.
- Curtain – height is notably smaller than its crest width.
- Cascade – vertical drop is broken into a series of steps causing water to cascade down incline.

Some of the criteria used to define a separate Hamilton waterfall include: The waterfall has to have a vertical drop of at least 3 metres or 10 feet (3.0 m) either as a vertical drop or a cascade, the crest width has to be at least 1 metre or 3 feet (0.91 m) wide, the waterfall must have some natural component and not be entirely man-made; If a waterfall is beside another waterfall but coming from two separate creeks or streams, then they could be considered as two separate waterfalls and the waterfall has to be located within the boundaries of the new City of Hamilton.

On January 1, 2001, the new city of Hamilton was formed from the amalgamation of the Regional Municipality of Hamilton-Wentworth and its six municipalities: Hamilton, Ancaster, Dundas, Flamborough, Glanbrook, and Stoney Creek. Before amalgamation, Hamilton had a population of 331,121 divided into 100 neighbourhoods. The new amalgamated city had 490,268 people in over 200 neighbourhoods.

== Waterfalls list ==
The Hamilton Conservation Authority maintains a web database of the city's waterfalls. The list below comes from that website, which contains 100 waterfalls.

Photo	Name	Height	Width	Coordinates
	Albion Falls	62.32 feet (19.00 m)	59.04 feet (18.00 m)	43.2004°N 79.8196°W
	Ancaster Heights Falls	43.952 feet (13.397 m)	5.904 feet (1.800 m)	43.2397°N 79.9628°W
	Auchmar Falls	40 feet (12 m)	5 feet (1.5 m)	43.2436°N 79.8912°W
	Baby Albion Falls	28 feet (8.5 m)	3 feet (0.91 m)	43.2001°N 79.8196°W
	Baby Webster Falls	29.52 feet (9.00 m)	9.84 feet (3.00 m)	43.2757°N 79.9819°W
	Beckett Falls	10 feet (3.0 m)	4 feet (1.2 m)	43.2449°N 79.8858°W
	Billy Green Falls	55.76 feet (17.00 m)	19.68 feet (6.00 m)	43.2072°N 79.7664°W
	Billy Monkley Cascade	10 feet (3.0 m)	21 feet (6.4 m)	43.1904°N 79.8304°W
	Blue Falls	13 feet (4.0 m)	10 feet (3.0 m)	
	Borer's Falls	49.2 feet (15.0 m)	16.4 feet (5.0 m)	43.2938°N 79.9368°W
	Broman Falls	22 feet (6.7 m)	3 feet (0.91 m)	43.2142°N 79.816°W
	Buttermilk Falls	75.44 feet (22.99 m)	26.24 feet (8.00 m)	43.2053°N 79.8196°W
	Canterbury Falls	29.52 feet (9.00 m)	13.12 feet (4.00 m)	43.237°N 79.9807°W
	Cave Falls	50 feet (15 m)	10 feet (3.0 m)	
	Centennial Falls	32.8 feet (10.0 m)	13.12 feet (4.00 m)	43.2086°N 79.7685°W
	Chedoke Falls	59.04 feet (18.00 m)	29.52 feet (9.00 m)	
	Clappison Falls	23 feet (7.0 m)	10 feet (3.0 m)	
	Cliffview Falls	49.2 feet (15.0 m)	9.84 feet (3.00 m)	43.2443°N 79.9079°W
	Darnley Cascade	13.12 feet (4.00 m)	72.16 feet (21.99 m)	43.2772°N 80.0068°W
	Denlow Falls	62.32 feet (19.00 m)	29.52 feet (9.00 m)	
	Devil's Punch Bowl Falls	121.36 feet (36.99 m)	9.84 feet (3.00 m)	43.2103°N 79.7559°W
	Dewitt Falls	22.96 feet (7.00 m)	6.56 feet (2.00 m)	43.2068°N 79.7184°W
	Duchess Falls	13 feet (4.0 m)	5 feet (1.5 m)	
	Dundas Falls	20.992 feet (6.398 m)	21.976 feet (6.698 m)	43.273°N 79.9722°W
	Dyment Falls	51.496 feet (15.696 m)	13.12 feet (4.00 m)	43.2782°N 79.9491°W
	East Glover's Falls	19.68 feet (6.00 m)	9.84 feet (3.00 m)	
	East Greensville Falls	18.04 feet (5.50 m)	4.92 feet (1.50 m)	43.2794°N 79.9915°W
	East Iroquoia Falls	65.6 feet (20.0 m)	3.936 feet (1.200 m)	43.2448°N 79.9386°W
	East of Fifty Falls	32.8 feet (10.0 m)	4.92 feet (1.50 m)	43.1949°N 79.6414°W
	Felker's Falls	72.16 feet (21.99 m)	19.68 feet (6.00 m)	43.2035°N 79.7902°W
	Ferguson Falls	97 feet (30 m)	6 feet (1.8 m)	
	Fifty Road Cascade	32.8 feet (10.0 m)	3.936 feet (1.200 m)	43.1946°N 79.6445°W
	Glover's Falls	26.24 feet (8.00 m)	9.84 feet (3.00 m)	
	Grand Cascade	13.12 feet (4.00 m)	3.28 feet (1.00 m)	43.1962°N 79.6501°W
	Great Falls	32.8 feet (10.0 m)	16.4 feet (5.0 m)	43.3305°N 79.8872°W
	Grindstone Cascade	9.84 feet (3.00 m)	16.4 feet (5.0 m)	43.3284°N 79.8869°W
	Hannon Cascade	10 feet (3.0 m)	18 feet (5.5 m)	
	Harvey Falls	52.48 feet (16.00 m)	9.84 feet (3.00 m)	43.1998°N 79.6597°W
	Heritage Falls	16.4 feet (5.0 m)	9.84 feet (3.00 m)	43.24°N 80.0039°W
	Heritage Green Falls	40 feet (12 m)	6 feet (1.8 m)	43.2047°N 79.7875°W
	Hermitage Cascade	13.12 feet (4.00 m)	16.4 feet (5.0 m)	43.2364°N 79.998°W
	Hidden Grindstone Falls	26 feet (7.9 m)	5 feet (1.5 m)	
	Jones Road Falls	19.68 feet (6.00 m)	6.56 feet (2.00 m)	43.2035°N 79.6956°W
	Lewis Road East Falls	26.24 feet (8.00 m)	16.4 feet (5.0 m)	43.2005°N 79.665°W
	Lewis Road West Falls	29.52 feet (9.00 m)	9.84 feet (3.00 m)	43.2003°N 79.6657°W
	Limeridge Falls	50 feet (15 m)	3 feet (0.91 m)	
	Little Canterbury Falls	16.4 feet (5.0 m)	6.56 feet (2.00 m)	43.2369°N 79.98°W
	Little Davis Falls	9.84 feet (3.00 m)	26.24 feet (8.00 m)	43.2067°N 79.7889°W
	Little Falls	22.96 feet (7.00 m)	9.84 feet (3.00 m)	43.2395°N 79.9656°W
	Lower Borer's Falls	9.84 feet (3.00 m)	16.4 feet (5.0 m)	
	Lower Chedoke Falls	19.68 feet (6.00 m)	36.08 feet (11.00 m)	43.2442°N 79.9004°W
	Lower Cliffview Falls	13.12 feet (4.00 m)	9.84 feet (3.00 m)	43.2457°N 79.9084°W
	Lower Glendale Falls	11 feet (3.4 m)	13 feet (4.0 m)	
	Lower Hopkins Cascade	19.68 feet (6.00 m)	11.48 feet (3.50 m)	43.2966°N 79.9292°W
	Lower Little Falls	26.896 feet (8.198 m)	5.904 feet (1.800 m)	43.24°N 79.9657°W
	Lower Mill Falls	19.68 feet (6.00 m)	13.12 feet (4.00 m)	43.234°N 79.9735°W
	Lower Mohawk Falls	20 feet (6.1 m)	12 feet (3.7 m)	
	Lower Princess Falls	129.8 feet (39.6 m)	9.84 feet (3.00 m)	43.2459°N 79.9299°W
	Lower Punchbowl Falls	19.68 feet (6.00 m)	19.68 feet (6.00 m)	43.2111°N 79.7573°W
	Lower Sanitorium Cascade	13.12 feet (4.00 m)	9.84 feet (3.00 m)	43.246°N 79.9149°W
	Lower Scenic Cascade	10 feet (3.0 m)	4 feet (1.2 m)	
	Lower Sydenham Falls	13.12 feet (4.00 m)	13.12 feet (4.00 m)	43.274°N 79.9584°W
	Lower Tew's Falls	12.136 feet (3.699 m)	21.976 feet (6.698 m)	
	Lower Westcliffe Falls	29.52 feet (9.00 m)	19.68 feet (6.00 m)	43.2457°N 79.9084°W
	McNeilly Falls	39.36 feet (12.00 m)	6.56 feet (2.00 m)	
	Middle Glendale Falls	10 feet (3.0 m)	11 feet (3.4 m)	43.2025°N 79.8094°W
	Mill Falls	22.96 feet (7.00 m)	13.12 feet (4.00 m)	43.2334°N 79.9739°W
	Mineral Springs Falls	9.84 feet (3.00 m)	6.56 feet (2.00 m)	43.2364°N 80.0124°W
	Mountain Spring Falls	50 feet (15 m)	8 feet (2.4 m)	43.2045°N 79.788°W
	Mountview Falls	32.8 feet (10.0 m)	19.68 feet (6.00 m)	43.2455°N 79.9214°W
	Oak Knoll Falls	25 feet (7.6 m)	4 feet (1.2 m)	
	Patterson East Cascade	15 feet (4.6 m)	5 feet (1.5 m)	43.2982°N 79.9271°W
	Patterson West Cascade	14 feet (4.3 m)	4 feet (1.2 m)	43.2979°N 79.9277°W
	Princess Falls	22.96 feet (7.00 m)	6.56 feet (2.00 m)	43.2458°N 79.9299°W
	Pritchard Falls	15 feet (4.6 m)	3 feet (0.91 m)	43.2011°N 79.8163°W
	Progreston Falls	21.976 feet (6.698 m)	54.12 feet (16.50 m)	43.3981°N 79.9599°W
	Promontory Falls	59.04 feet (18.00 m)	3.28 feet (1.00 m)	43.1982°N 79.6523°W
	Puddicombe Falls	19.68 feet (6.00 m)	6.56 feet (2.00 m)	43.1945°N 79.6379°W
	Rock Chapel Falls	26.24 feet (8.00 m)	4.92 feet (1.50 m)	43.2911°N 79.9366°W
	Romar Cascade	23 feet (7.0 m)	4 feet (1.2 m)	
	Scenic Falls	65.6 feet (20.0 m)	19.68 feet (6.00 m)	43.2442°N 79.9348°W
	Sherman Falls	55.76 feet (17.00 m)	26.24 feet (8.00 m)	43.2381°N 79.9729°W
	Smith Cascade	15 feet (4.6 m)	6.5 feet (2.0 m)	
	Snake Falls	82 feet (25 m)	9.84 feet (3.00 m)	
	Steven's Falls	26.24 feet (8.00 m)	16.4 feet (5.0 m)	
	Sugar Shack Falls	30 feet (9.1 m)	13 feet (4.0 m)	43.2845°N 79.9375°W
	Tew's Falls	134.48 feet (40.99 m)	29.52 feet (9.00 m)	43.2807°N 79.9783°W
	Tiffany Falls	68.88 feet (20.99 m)	19.68 feet (6.00 m)	43.2382°N 79.9581°W
	Upper Glendale Falls	9.84 feet (3.00 m)	9.84 feet (3.00 m)	43.2023°N 79.8097°W
	Upper Hopkins Cascade	10.496 feet (3.199 m)	7.544 feet (2.299 m)	
	Upper Mohawk Cascade	10 feet (3.0 m)	8 feet (2.4 m)	
	Upper Quarry Cascade	13.12 feet (4.00 m)	3.936 feet (1.200 m)	43.3134°N 79.9064°W
	Upper Sanatorium Falls	29.52 feet (9.00 m)	9.84 feet (3.00 m)	43.2447°N 79.9148°W
	Valley Falls	14 feet (4.3 m)	14 feet (4.3 m)	43.2975°N 79.9283°W
	Veevers Falls	45.92 feet (14.00 m)	8.2 feet (2.5 m)	43.2082°N 79.7809°W
	Walnut Grove Falls	15 feet (4.6 m)	3.6 feet (1.1 m)	
	Washboard Falls	16.4 feet (5.0 m)	19.68 feet (6.00 m)	
	Webster's Falls	72.16 feet (21.99 m)	98.4 feet (30.0 m)	43.2762°N 79.9809°W
	Wesley Cascade	13 feet (4.0 m)	3 feet (0.91 m)	
	West Iroquoia Falls	64.944 feet (19.795 m)	3.28 feet (1.00 m)	43.2442°N 79.9404°W
	West Moss Cascade	10 feet (3.0 m)	3 feet (0.91 m)	
	West of Fifty Upper Cascade	26.24 feet (8.00 m)	4.92 feet (1.50 m)	43.1957°N 79.6477°W
	Westcliffe Falls	49.2 feet (15.0 m)	6.56 feet (2.00 m)	43.2454°N 79.9085°W

== Water quality problems ==
Many of Hamilton's creeks and waterfalls, especially those in the heavily urbanized Chedoke and Red Hill creek watersheds, suffer from chronic water quality problems. Much of these systems have been buried in large underground concrete storm sewers that run under neighbourhoods established decades ago atop the Niagara escarpment. Industrial and residential use through the 19th, 20th and 21st centuries have caused, and continue to cause, substantial environmental damage to these watersheds. While the city of Hamilton has invested in wastewater storage tanks and tunnels in recent years, as of 2020, water testing performed by non-governmental monitoring bodies continues to reveal high e. coli counts. While the City of Hamilton's website does state that some waterfalls may be polluted and discourages entering the water around waterfalls, it does not state which ones are polluted, nor does the city test the water at any waterfall locations, since it does not designate them as official swimming areas.

=== Chedoke Falls and watershed ===
In March 2020, it was revealed that as much as 24 billion litres of untreated wastewater had been leaking into Chedoke creek since at least 2014 due to insufficiencies in Hamilton's sewerage and stormwater management system. Chedoke falls is often listed as one of Hamilton's 10 most popular waterfalls, and visitors can regularly be seen swimming and wading in its waters. The Chedoke creek watershed has seen regular discharges of raw sewage for the past century; today, untreated wastewater is discharged into the river regularly during rainstorms, when the city's Combined Sewer Overflows (CSO's) and a 77 million litre concrete wastewater storage tank are incapable of handling increased water volumes. The storm sewer feeding Chedoke falls has also been plagued by incorrectly installed sanitary sewer cross-connections from the residential neighbourhoods it runs beneath. The amount of raw sewage flowing into the creek on an ongoing basis is unknown. These problems are compounded by the fact that the Chedoke creek is buried in a series of concrete stormwater-and-overflow sewers for almost all of its length; indeed, Chedoke falls itself flows directly out of a storm sewer outfall, visible from the base of the falls. Other waterfalls in the Chedoke creek watershed include Westcliffe Falls and Princess Falls.

=== Albion Falls and watershed ===
Albion Falls is one of Hamilton's largest waterfalls, and sees a significant volume of visitors during the summertime. All of the water flowing over the falls originates in storm sewers that drain substantial portions of Hamilton's west mountain neighbourhoods. In particular, the Stone Church Rd. Storm Trunk Sewer that drains neighbourhoods on either side of Stone Church Road East, nicknamed the "mountain juggernaut", is the largest known sewer in Canada. Water from upstream of the falls emerges from various sewer outfalls, traverses the Dartnall Rd. off-ramps from the Lincoln M. Alexander Parkway, and proceeds to a pond adjacent to the falls before flowing over the falls themselves. Studies in the early 2000s and 2012 indicated high concentrations of e. coli bacteria in various locations along the Red Hill creek watershed, which Albion falls is a part of. A 2013 study of a Red Hill sub-watershed, the Upper Ottawa Creek, noted high concentrations of chloride, sodium, various heavy metals, phosphorus, and likely contamination from sanitary sewer cross-connections. It remains unknown whether the city has addressed these issues.

== Images ==
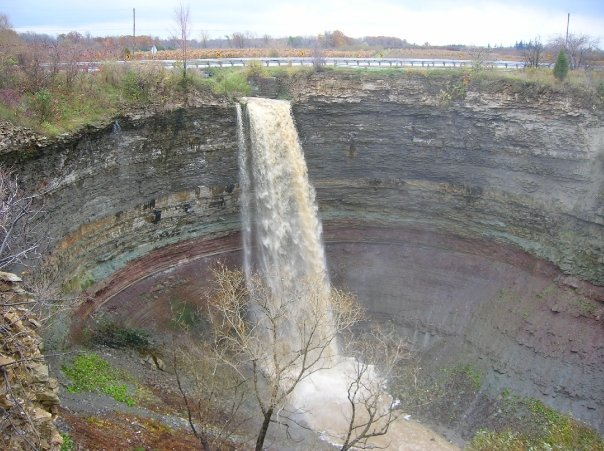
Devil's Punch Bowl

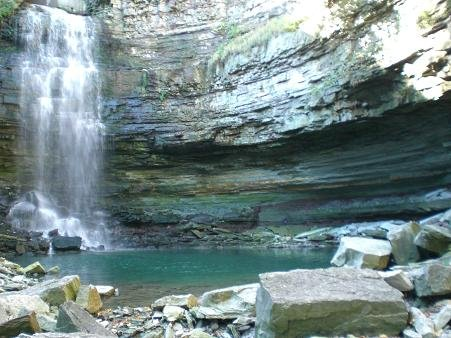
Chedoke Falls

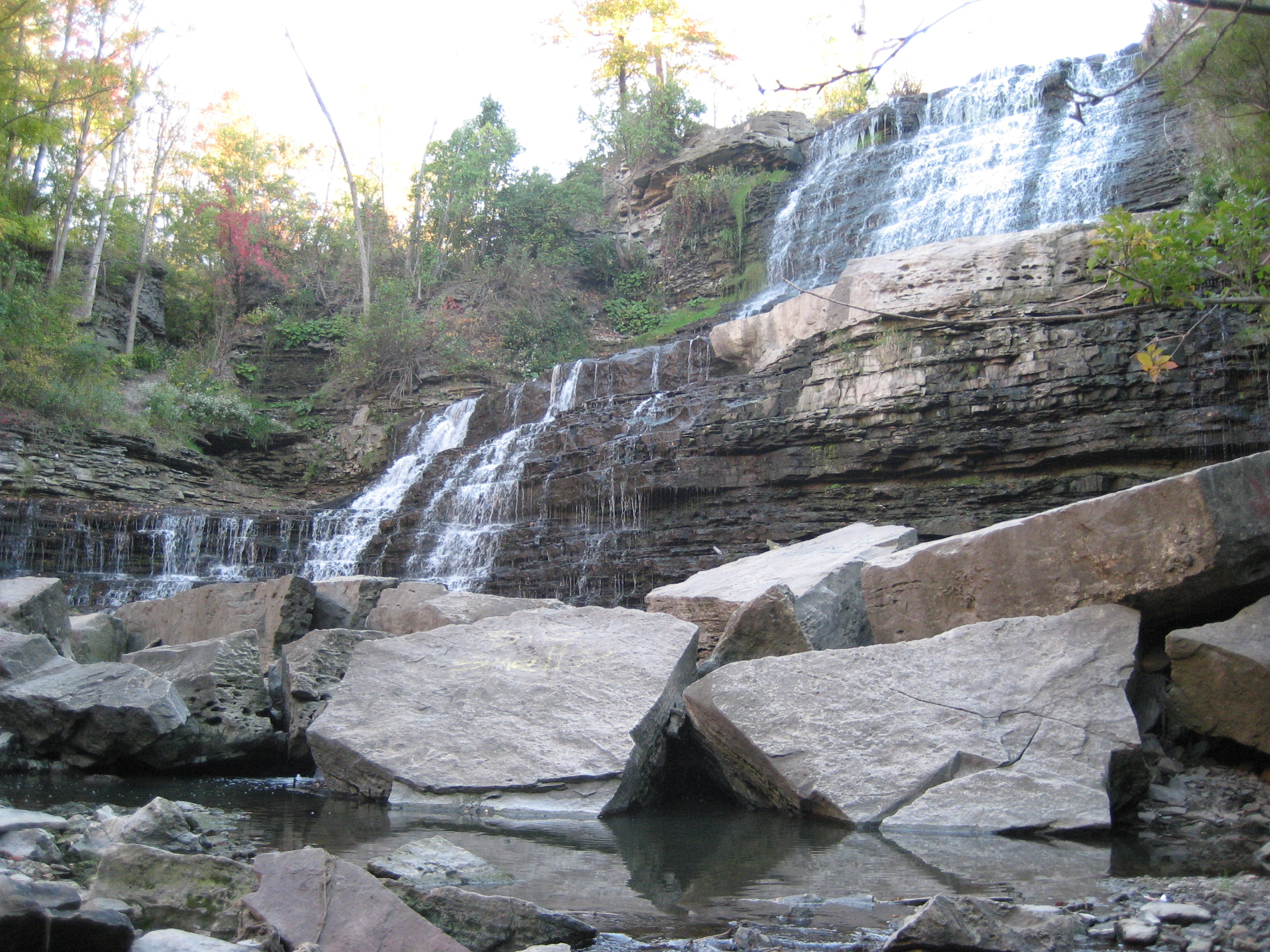
Albion Falls, King's Forest Park

== See also ==
- List of waterfalls
- List of waterfalls in Canada
- Geography of Hamilton, Ontario
