= Spencer Creek (Ontario) =

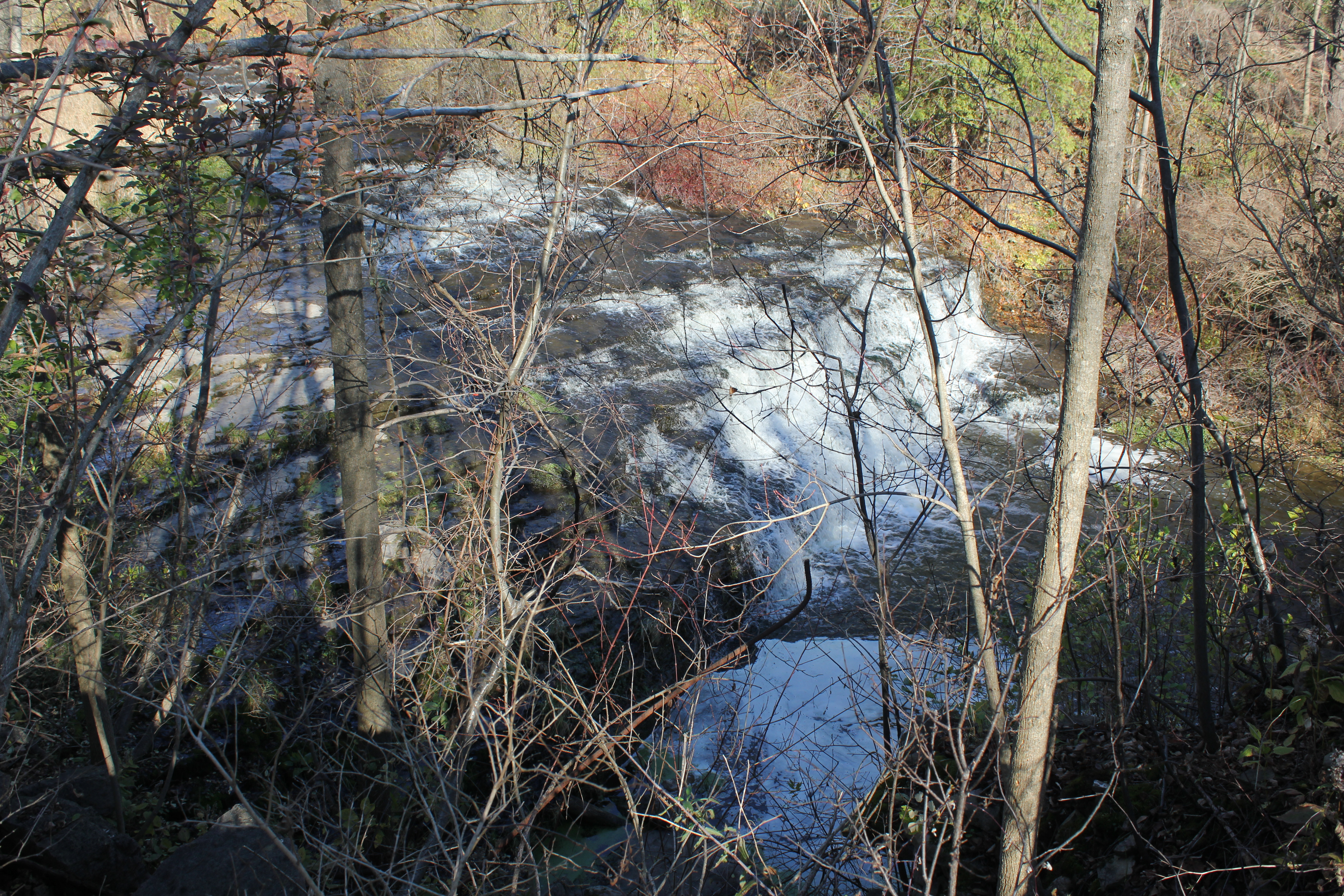
- Spencer Creek cascade
- Etymology: Named after Spencer Gorge, a Y-shaped gorge

Location
- Country: Canada
- Province: Ontario
- Region: Greater Toronto Area
- Municipality: Hamilton

Physical characteristics
- Source: ditch
  - coordinates: 43°16′42″N 80°00′24″W
- Mouth: Cootes Paradise, which feeds into Hamilton Harbour (Lake Ontario)

Basin features
- River system: Great Lakes Basin

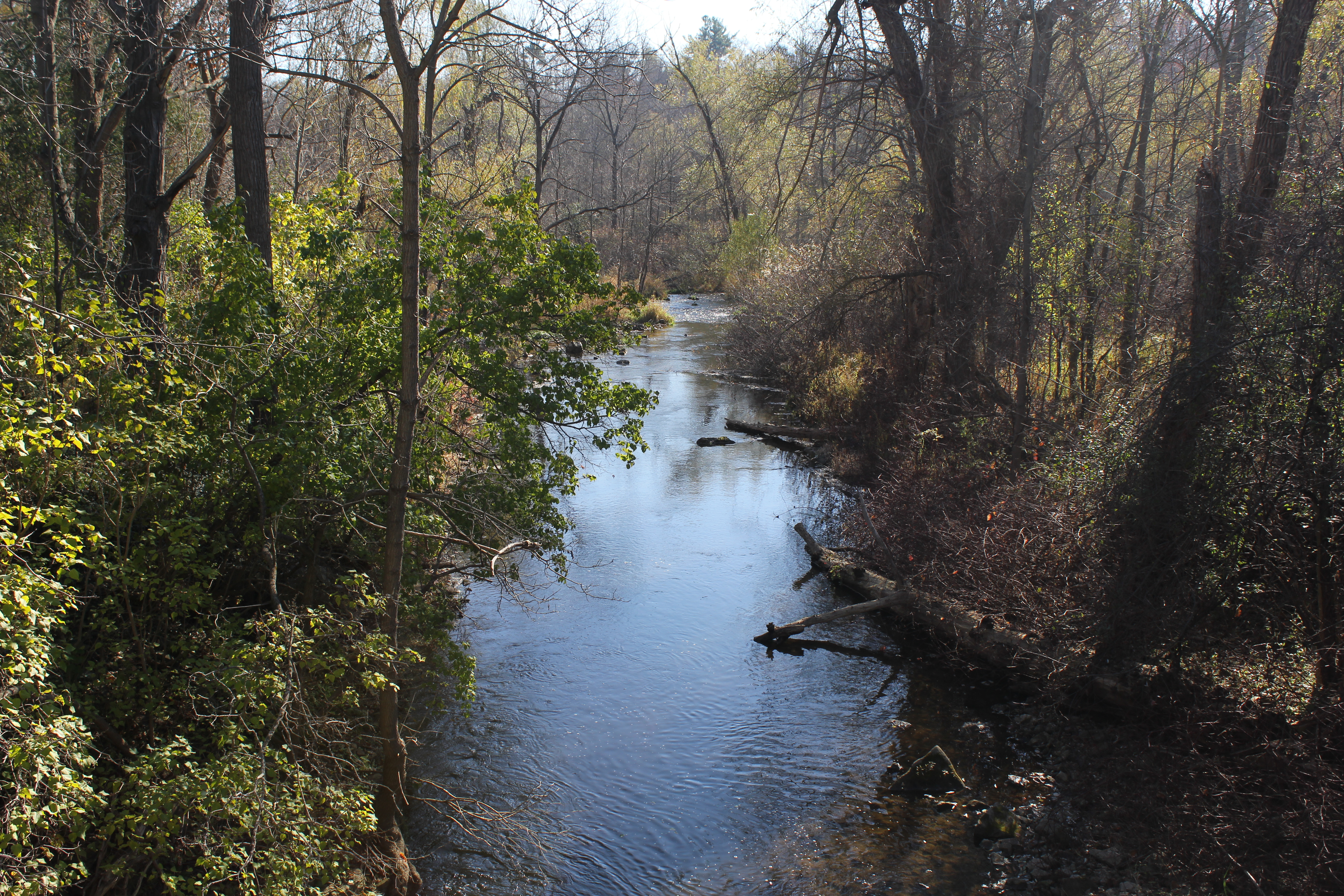
Spencer Creek in Spencer Gorge Conservation Area

Spencer Creek is a creek in Flamborough, Ontario. Banks of the Creek is made up of residential homes, farms, and businesses.

== Recreation ==
Traveling through the area using Highway 97.

== Camping ==
The area is home to many trailer parks and more prominently the Spencer Gorge/Webster's Falls Conservation Area and Valens Conservation Area,

== See also ==
- Adventure travel
- Bruce Trail
- Cambridge, Ontario
- Puslinch, Ontario
- Spencer Creek Trail
