= Greensville, Ontario =

Community in Hamilton, Ontario, Canada

Coordinates: 43.2907°N 80.0027°W

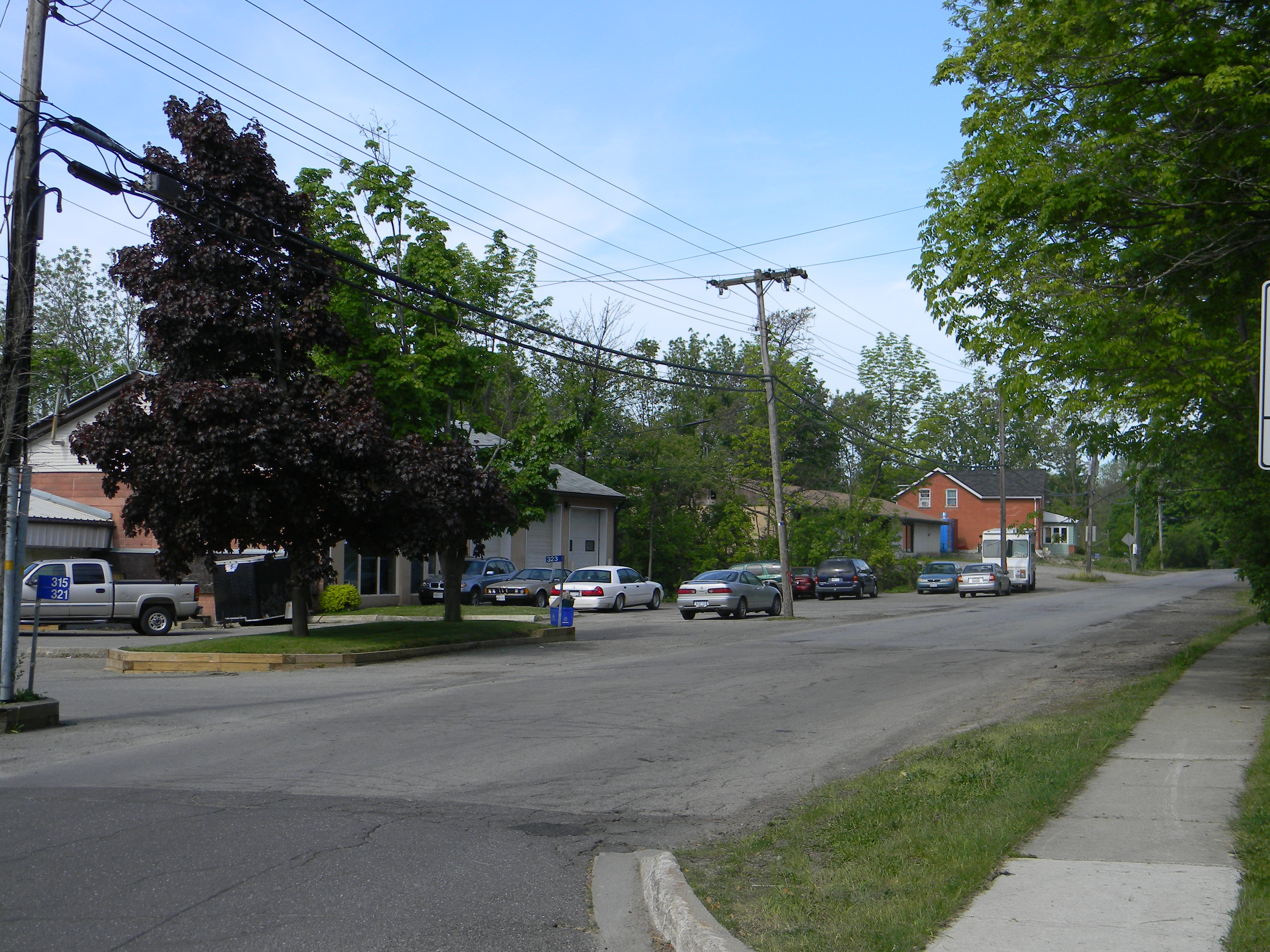
Greensville downtown

Greensville is a community in Flamborough, Hamilton in the Canadian province of Ontario.

Hamilton Conservation Authority attractions Webster's Falls and Tew's Falls are in Greensville.

Well-known Canadian philanthropist and Hamilton Sports Hall of Fame member, Charles Juravinski and his wife Margaret are Greensville residents.

Jamaican Canadian billionaire Michael Lee-Chin was also at one time a Greensville Resident.

== See also ==
- List of communities in Ontario
