= Lower Westcliffe Falls =

- Interactive map of Lower Westcliffe Falls
- Location: Hamilton, Ontario
- Coordinates: 43.24578°N 79.90855°W
- Type: Complex Classic Cascade
- Total height: 7.9 m (26 ft)
- Total width: 4.8 m (16 ft)
- Watercourse: Chedoke tributary

Lower Westcliffe Falls is a 7.9-metre-high (26 ft) complex classic cascade waterfall found near the Chedoke Civic Golf Course in Hamilton, Ontario, Canada.

Nearby attractions include the Bruce Trail, Dundas Valley Conservation Area, Iroquoia Heights Conservation Area, Chedoke Radial Trail, Chedoke Civic Golf Course, Cliffview Falls.

Westcliffe Falls is a Complex Ribbon Cascade with water flowing year round. It is located on a Chedoke tributary and has a height of 18 metres (60 feet) and a crest width of 1.8 metres (6 feet).

On the poster "Waterfalls of Hamilton Seasons" (2002), this waterfall was referred to as "Waterfall West of Cliffview Park" because it did not have a proper name yet. Two years later (2004) the name of Westcliffe Falls was assigned by the Hamilton Conservation Authority.

== Directions ==
From Highway 403 take the Aberdeen Avenue exit and travel approximately 1 kilometre until Studholme Road. Turn right onto Studholme Road and then turn left onto Beddoe Drive and follow to Chedoke Civic Golf Course. The waterfall is located beside the steel stairway on the western end of the parking lot to the right of the Lower Cliffview Falls.
