= Borer's Falls =

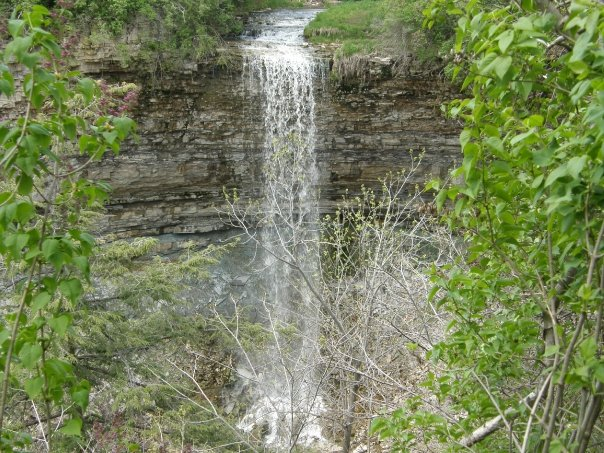
- Borer's Falls
- Interactive map of Borer's Falls
- Location: Hamilton, Ontario
- Coordinates: 43.293976°N 79.936812°W
- Type: Ribbon
- Total height: 15 m (49 ft)
- Total width: 9 m (30 ft)
- Watercourse: Borer's Creek

Borer's Falls is a 15-metre-high (49 ft) ribbon-style waterfall found along the trails of Royal Botanical Gardens Rock Chapel trail system in Dundas, Hamilton, Ontario, Canada. A road side walk along the gorge from the parking lot is required to reach it. Its source is Borer's Creek. A very picturesque waterfall featured on many Hamilton waterfall postcards over the years. Named after the Borer family who ran a sawmill for over a century. This mill was the lifeblood of the village of Rock Chapel. Also known as Rock Chapel Falls. The area is a hiker's haven and also an ice-climbing destination in the winter when the weather is cold enough to freeze the Falls.

Nearby attractions include the Bruce Trail, Cootes Paradise, Borer's Falls, Borer's Falls Conservation Area, the Spencer Gorge / Webster's Falls Conservation Area, Rock Chapel Sanctuary and Royal Botanical Gardens, who own the lands around the falls. There are also many other waterfalls in the area.

Lower Borer's Falls is a complex curtain/ cascade waterfall, 3 metres in height and 5 metres wide and hidden in the environmental protection area of the gorge and not intended for access but can be heard from the escarpment edge rim trail above.

== Directions ==
Borer's Falls can be accessed from the Dundas section of the Bruce Trail and also from the Borer's Falls Conservation Area.

By car take the QEW west to Highway 403, which you will follow to Highway 6 in Flamborough and go north. Go left on Highway 5 (Dundas Street), and left on Rock Chapel Road.

== Hazards ==
The Bruce Trail passes by the edge of Borer's Falls and presents a hazard to people with young children, as there is a poorly marked high vertical drop inches from what appears to be the trail; unless one reads a small sign directing you to walk on the road.

== See also ==
- List of waterfalls
- List of waterfalls in Canada
