= Webster's Falls =

Waterfall in Ontario, Canada

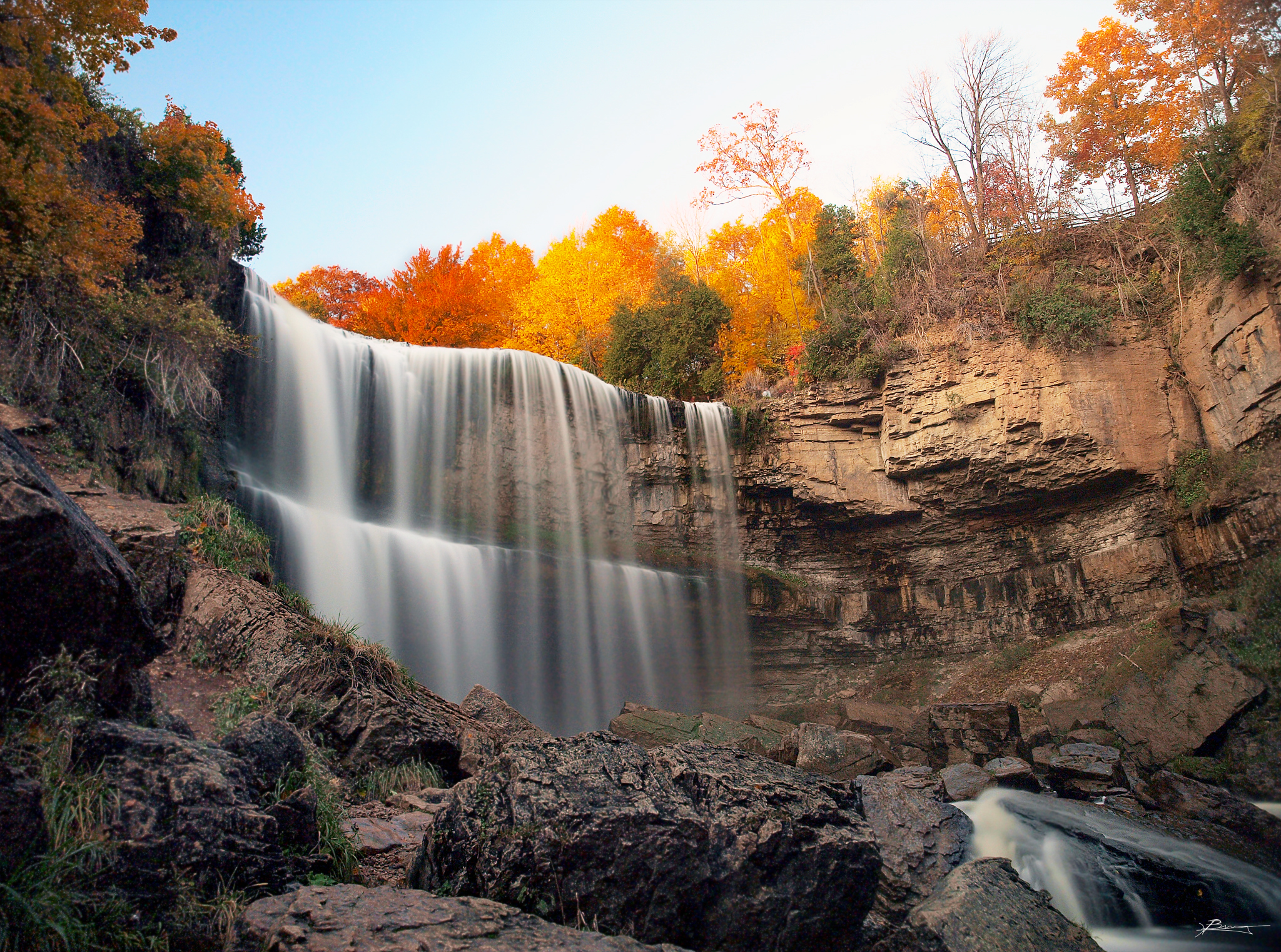
- Webster's Falls in 2009
- Interactive map of Webster's Falls
- Location: Hamilton, Ontario, Canada
- Coordinates: 43.276241°N 79.980898°W
- Type: Curtain; Plunge
- Total height: 22 m (72 ft)
- Total width: 30 m (98 ft)
- Watercourse: Spencer Creek

Webster's Falls is a 22-metre-high (72 ft) classical curtain and plunge waterfall located in the Spencer Gorge Conservation Area in Hamilton, Ontario, Canada. The water flows down Spencer Creek. In the past, the falls have been known by various names such as Dr. Hamilton's Falls, Spencer Falls, Hart Falls, Fisher Falls and Flamborough Falls.

The cobblestone footbridge, as well as a newer and narrower stone and concrete footbridge, crosses over Spencer Creek to the west side.

== Baby Webster's Falls ==
Baby Webster's Falls is a complex ribbon waterfall which has water mainly during seasonal storms and after the winter snow melts. Its height is 20 metres and its width is 3 metres (10 ft) It is located on a tributary of the Spencer Creek, on a separate ravine near Webster's Falls and can be seen from the top of the gorge.

Hamilton Firefighters have performed a total of 163 rope rescues between 2005 and August 2016, many of which have occurred at Webster's and Tew's Falls.

== Images ==
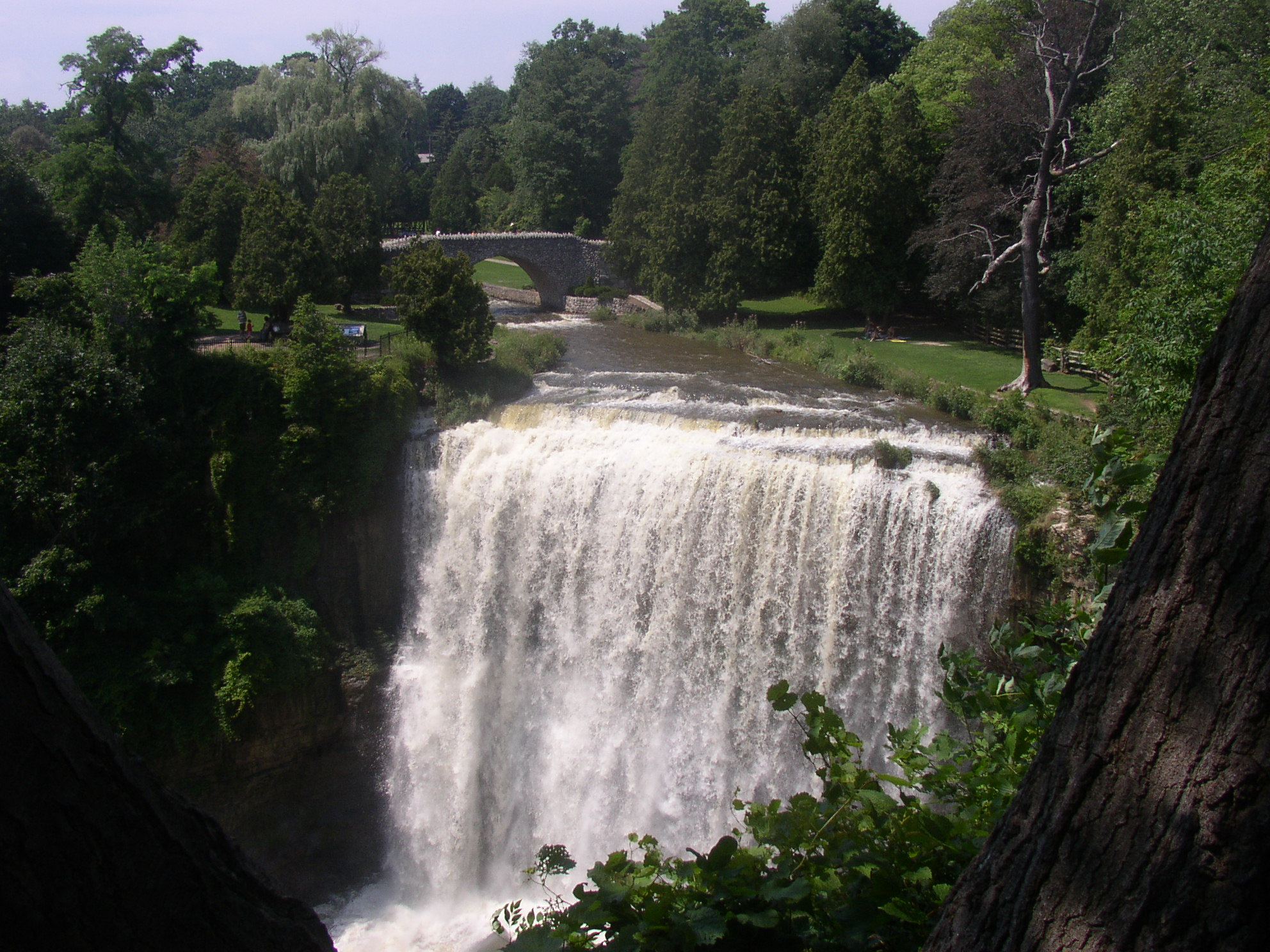
Webster's Falls in Summer

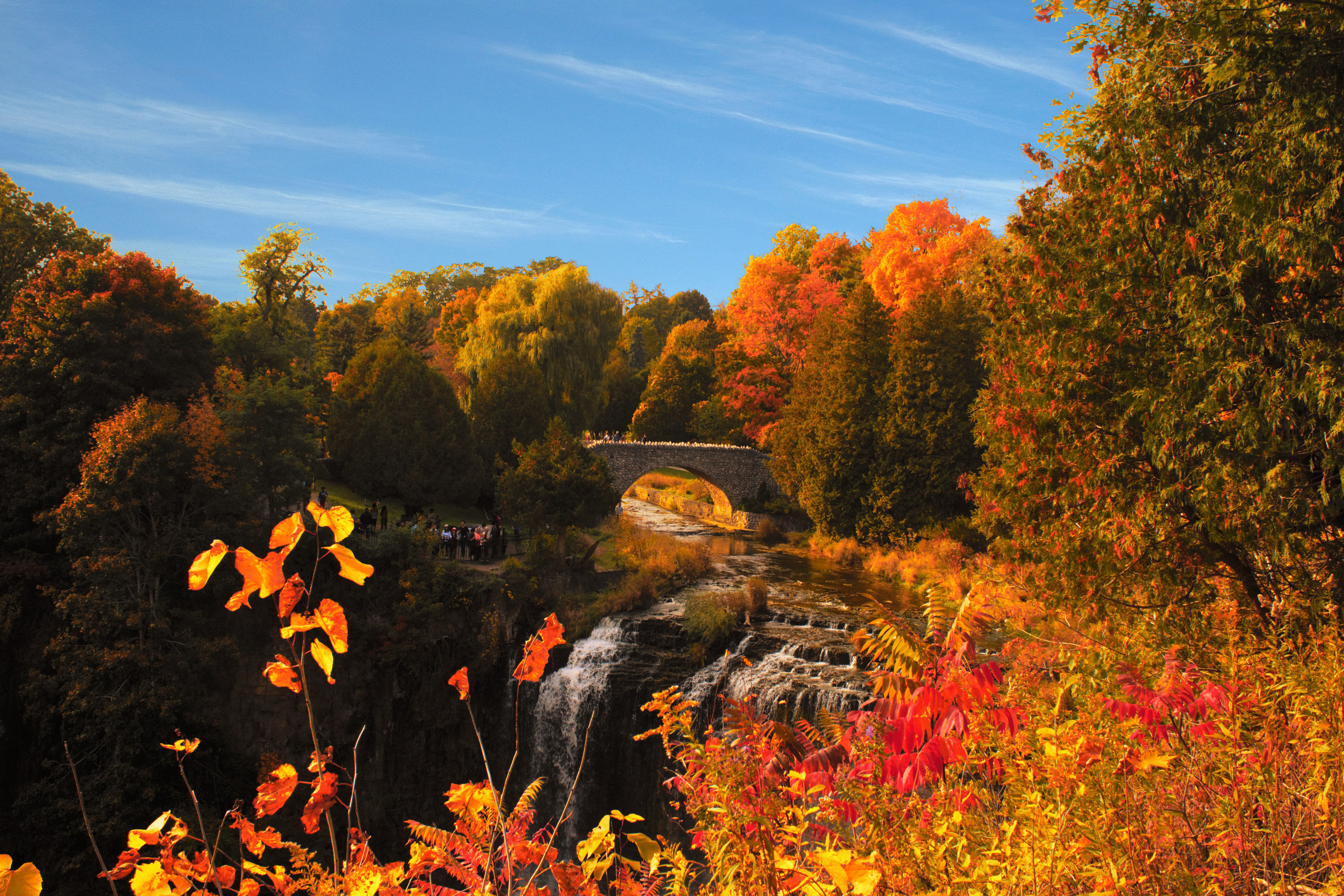
Webster's Falls in Fall

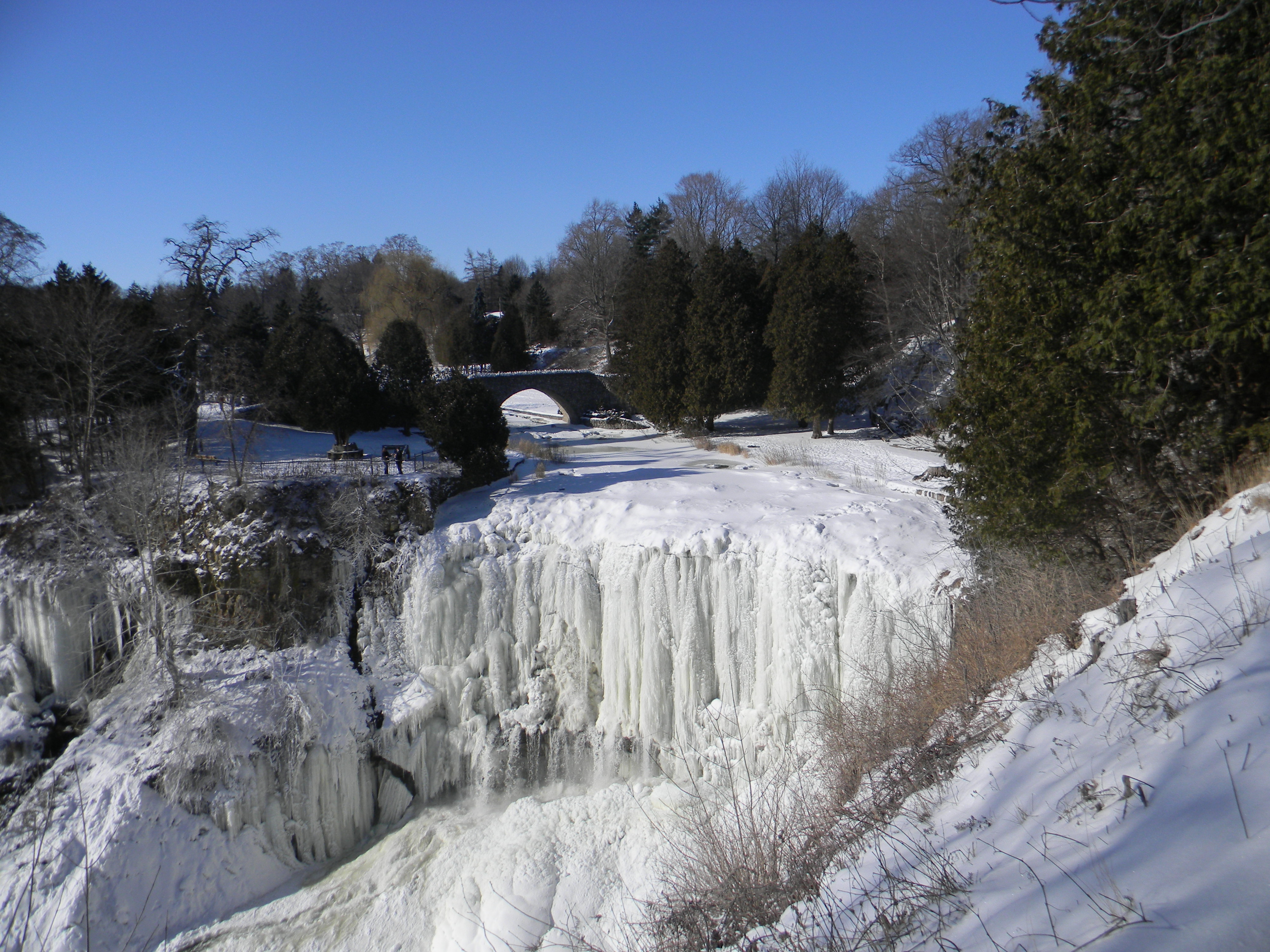
Webster's Falls in Winter

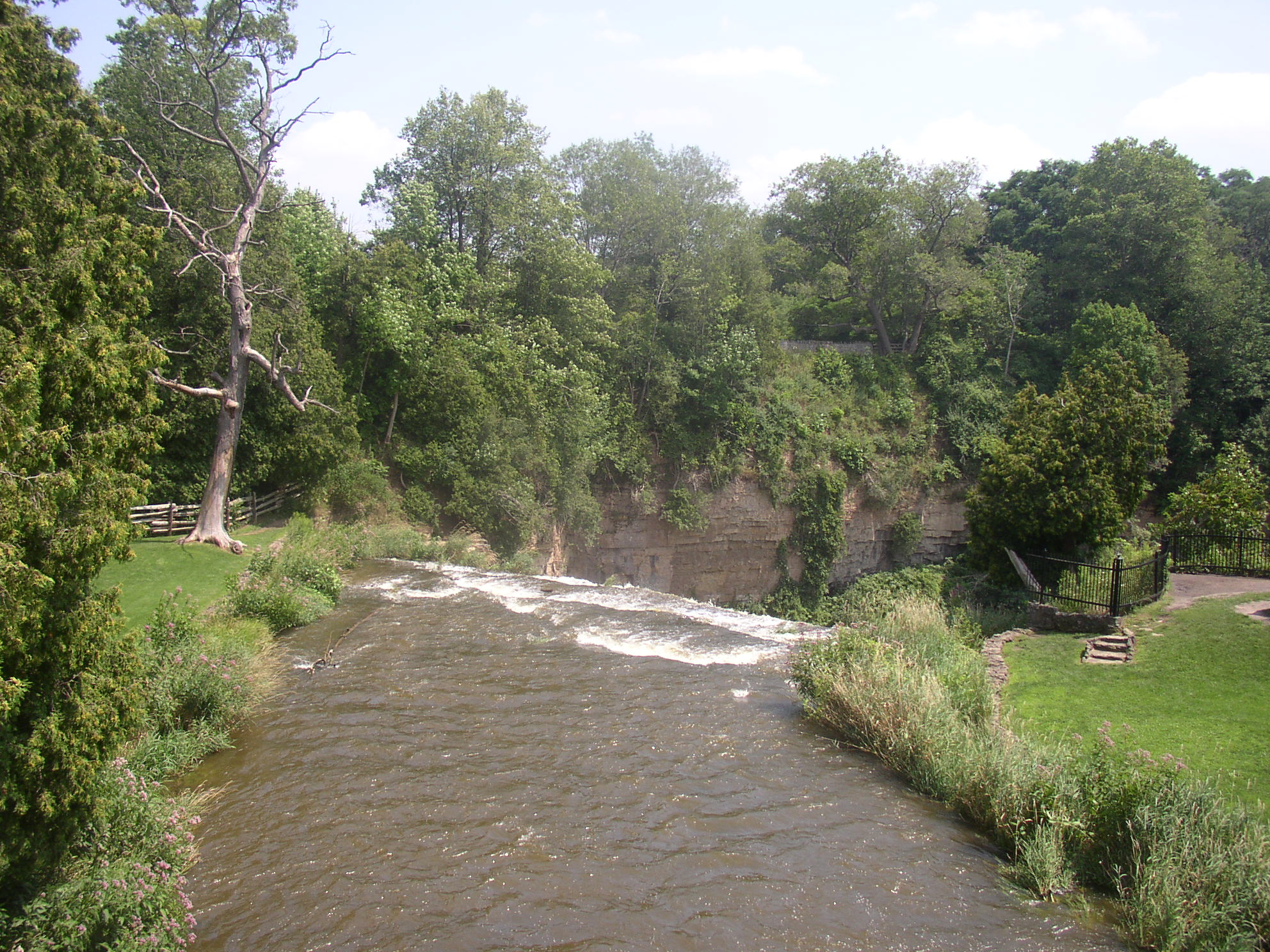
Webster's Falls

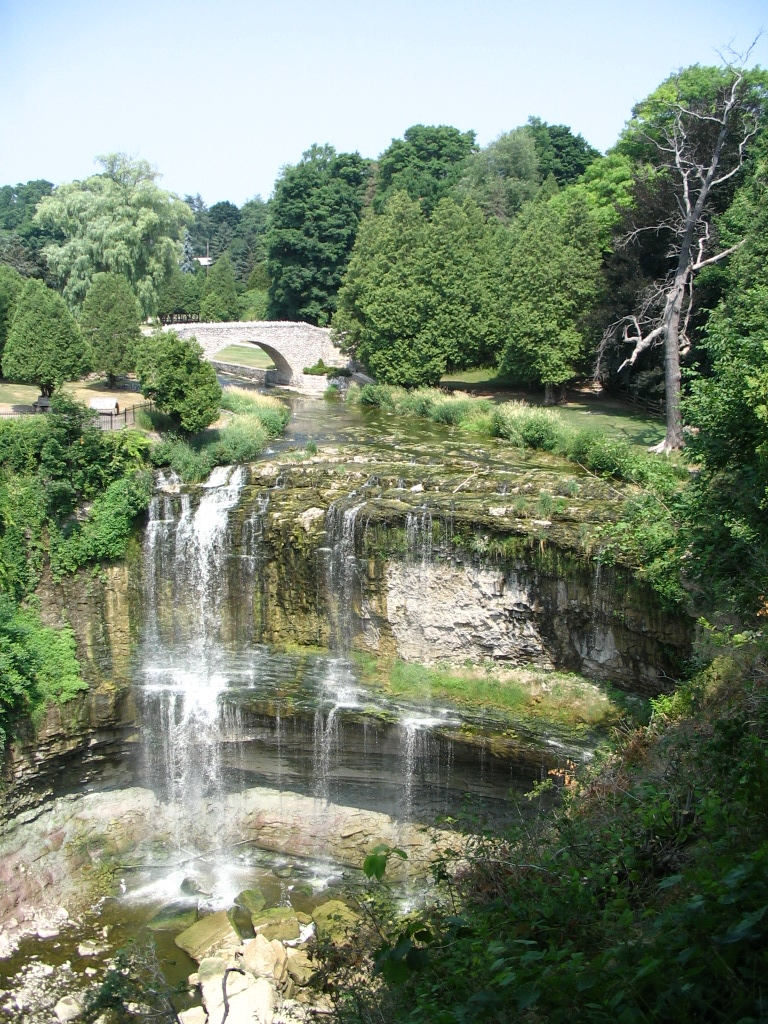
Webster's Falls

== See also ==
- List of waterfalls
- List of waterfalls in Hamilton, Ontario
