= Dundas Valley Conservation Area =

Conservation area in Ontario, Canada

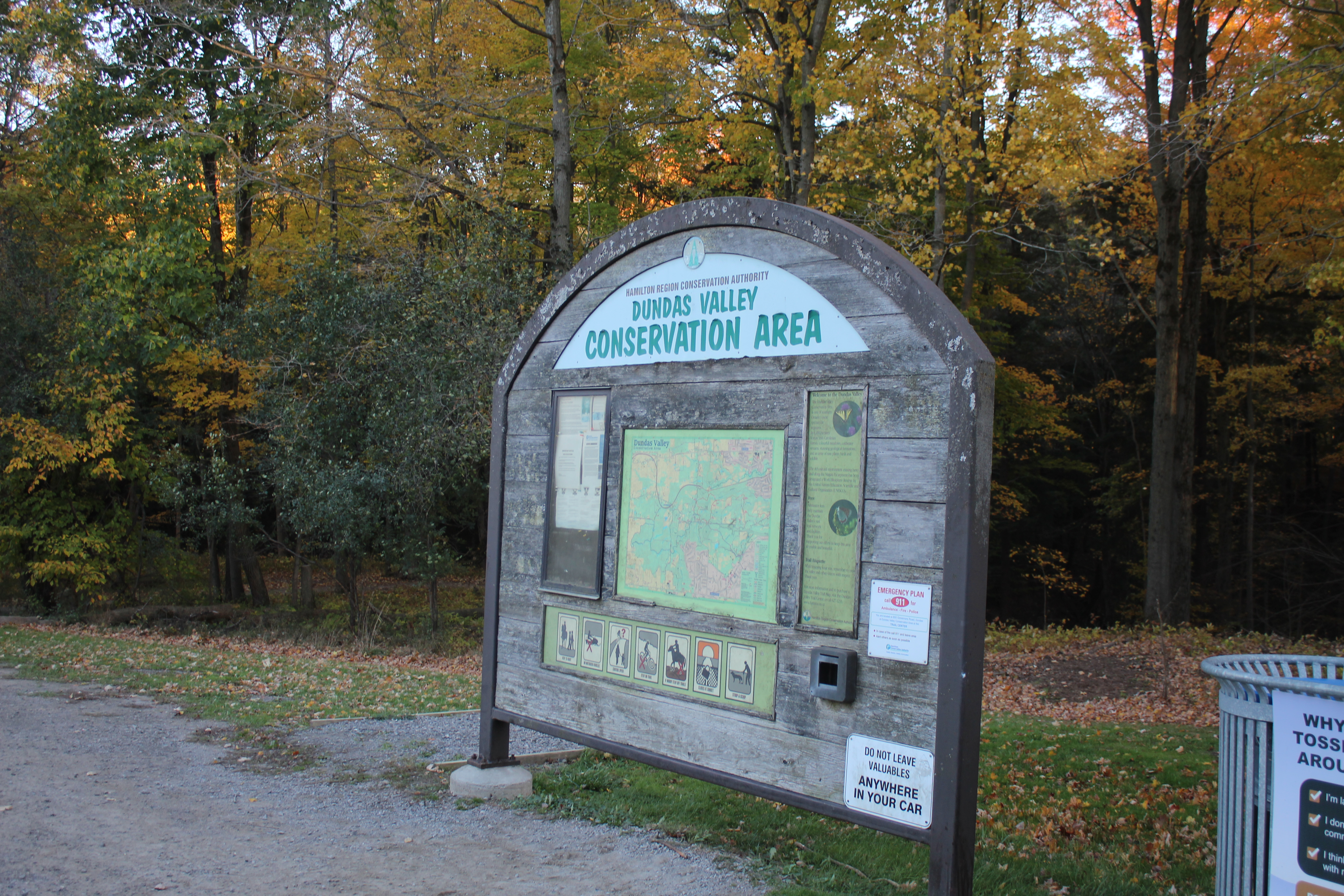
- Entrance to the Conservation Area in October 2020
- Interactive map of Dundas Valley Conservation Area
- Location: Canada
- Nearest city: Hamilton, Ontario
- Coordinates: 43°14′15″N 79°59′38″W
- Area: 1,200 ha (3,000 acres)
- Established: 1970
- Governing body: Hamilton Conservation Authority
- Website: https://conservationhamilton.ca/conservation-areas/dundas-valley/

Dundas Valley Conservation Area is located on the Niagara Escarpment in Dundas, Ontario, a constituent community of Hamilton, Ontario, and is owned and operated by the Hamilton Conservation Authority. Its 40-kilometre trail system provides a connection to the Bruce Trail. The area contains a trailhead of the Hamilton-Brantford-Cambridge Trails, Canada's first fully developed interurban multi-use trail system, which is a part of the Trans Canada Trail.

== Landform ==
The origins of the Dundas Valley, the main feature of the area, date back to the pre-glacial times, when the Niagara Escarpment was deeply incised by erosion. The Wisconsin Glaciation furthered the erosion processes and resulted in deposition of glacial and glaciolacustrine sediments, forming the hummocky kame and kettle topography of the present. In post-glacial times, the land has been shaped by the various streams that run through Dundas Valley. The area is contained in the Carolinian forest area of Eastern North America. It contains 585 species of plants and animals, including 55 endangered species.

== Trail system ==
The Dundas Valley 40-kilometre long trail system is a recreational network of hiking, cycling and equestrian trails. It contains trails that form a loop, as well as out-and-back trails that have different start and finish terminals. While the majority of trails are contained in the area of Dundas, Ontario, there are some that extend Southwest into the neighboring community of Ancaster, Ontario.

=== Main Loop Trail ===
The Main Loop Trail connects directly to the Trail Centre. It is an approximately 3,420m loop located in the heart of Dundas Valley that also serves as a connection to other trails. The Main Loop Trail is also part of the Bruce Trail. The trail passes by The Hermitage as well as the Hermitage Parking Lot and the Merrick Parking Lot.

=== Headwaters Trail ===
Approximately one kilometer from the Trail Centre, the Headwaters Trail begins from an entrance on the Main Loop Trail. The 10.5-kilometre trail loop is the longest in Dundas Valley and consists of rolling hills, forests and meadows. Initially the trail passes by the Griffin House and crosses Sulphur Springs Road in Dundas, Ontario. The trail continues South and crosses Martin Road in Ancaster, Ontario, where it continues for approximately 1400 meters before forming a 3,240m loop just East of Paddy Greene Road in Ancaster. Headwaters Trail is also the entrance to the following trails: Homestead Trail, Lookout Trail, G. Donald Trail, and Spring Valley Trail.

=== Sawmill Trail ===
Directly North of the Trail Centre is the Sawmill Trail. It is a 2.6 kilometer long loop that passes by Sawmill Pond and connects to the McCormack, Beckett, John White and Spring Creek Trails. Along the Sawmill Trail is the John A. Beckett Living Forest. Named after a local judge and Hamilton Conservation Authority founder, the forest contains trees native to the area that have been dedicated in honour of a person of the donor's choosing.

== Cultural heritage ==
=== Trail Centre ===
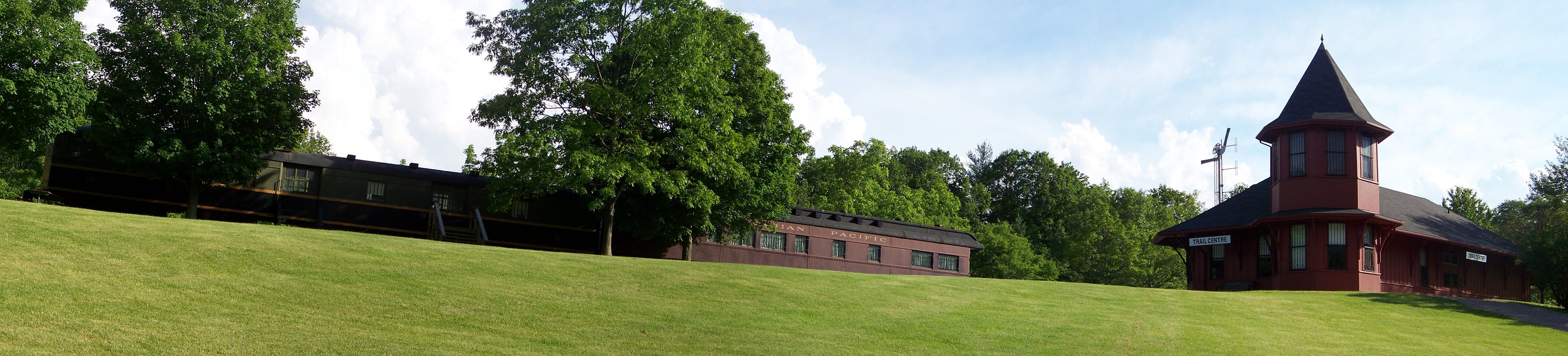
The Trail Centre

A modern replica of a Victorian railway station serves as the area's Trail Centre. Adjacent to it is a remnant of the Toronto, Hamilton and Buffalo Railway track, with a 1929 executive coach car and a 1931 baggage car donated by the Canadian Pacific Railway. The track was converted into an interurban rail trail, having been abandoned in 1988. This rail trail now serves as part of the Hamilton to Brantford Rail Trail, a 32-kilometre trail with terminals in West Hamilton and East Brantford.

The Giant Rib Discovery Centre is located in the Trail Centre. Open seven days a week in July and August, and on weekends September to June, the Centre features natural history displays and education programs about the Niagara Valley Escarpment.

=== The Hermitage ===
A stone mansion was built in 1855 by George Gordon Browne Leith, an immigrant from Scotland. Construction materials were obtained locally. Bricks originated from the Dundas Valley clay; limestone was quarried at the Credit River valley. Numerous attendant buildings were built, including a carriage house, children's nursery and a stable. After the death of Mrs. Leith in 1900, Mrs. Alma Dick Lauder, Leith's daughter and writer for the Hamilton Spectator, lived in The Hermitage. In October 1934, The Hermitage was almost completely burned. ~~The Hermitage burned down in 1934. After that, Leith's daughter~~ Mrs. Lauder then built a much smaller house among the ruins and lived there until her death in 1942. To prevent further deterioration, the ruins were stabilized using wooden braces.

=== Sulphur Springs Hotel ===
In 1865, George Leith sold ten acres of land to Mr. and Mrs. Matthew Wright on the north side of present-day Sulphur Springs Road. In 1870 they sold the property, and in 1880 the eighteen-bedroom home was turned into a hotel. A sulphurous mineral spring is found in the area. ~~was the site of the Sulphur Springs Hotel built during the late 1880s~~.Since sulphur was believed to possess curative properties by local settlers and Indigenous people, the hotel's mineral spa was a very popular summertime destination. The hotel closed down in 1910 after it was ravaged by two fires. The spring flows from a fountain first built in 1820 from cast iron. In 1850, it was replaced by a cement fountain. Having crumbled, it was restored in 1972.

=== Griffin House ===
The Griffin House was purchased in 1834 by Enerals Griffin and his wife Priscilla, including fifty acres of land. Born a slave in Virginia, Enerals escaped to Canada sometime in 1828-29, and both he and his descendants farmed in the area for the next 150 years. The house is 1.5 storeys and consists of a dining room, living room and two upstairs bedrooms. The house was sold to the Hamilton Region Conservation Authority in 1988, with much of the original siding and clapboard preserved due to it being covered with board and batten cladding.

Today, the Griffin House can be seen off of the Headwaters Trail, on Mineral Springs Road in Ancaster.

== Events ==
The OFSAA Cross Country Championships in 1994 saw competitors run through portions of the Headwaters Trail in Ancaster, off of Martin Road.

Since 1992, Dundas Valley has also been the venue for the Sulphur Springs Trail Race, a series of running races of various distances that utilize different trail loops in Dundas Valley.

The Hamilton Conservation Authority Equestrian Campout was first hosted in 2005, which is a weekend-long event where participants camp in the conservation area with their horses.
