= Spencer Gorge Conservation Area =

Conservation area in Hamilton, Ontario

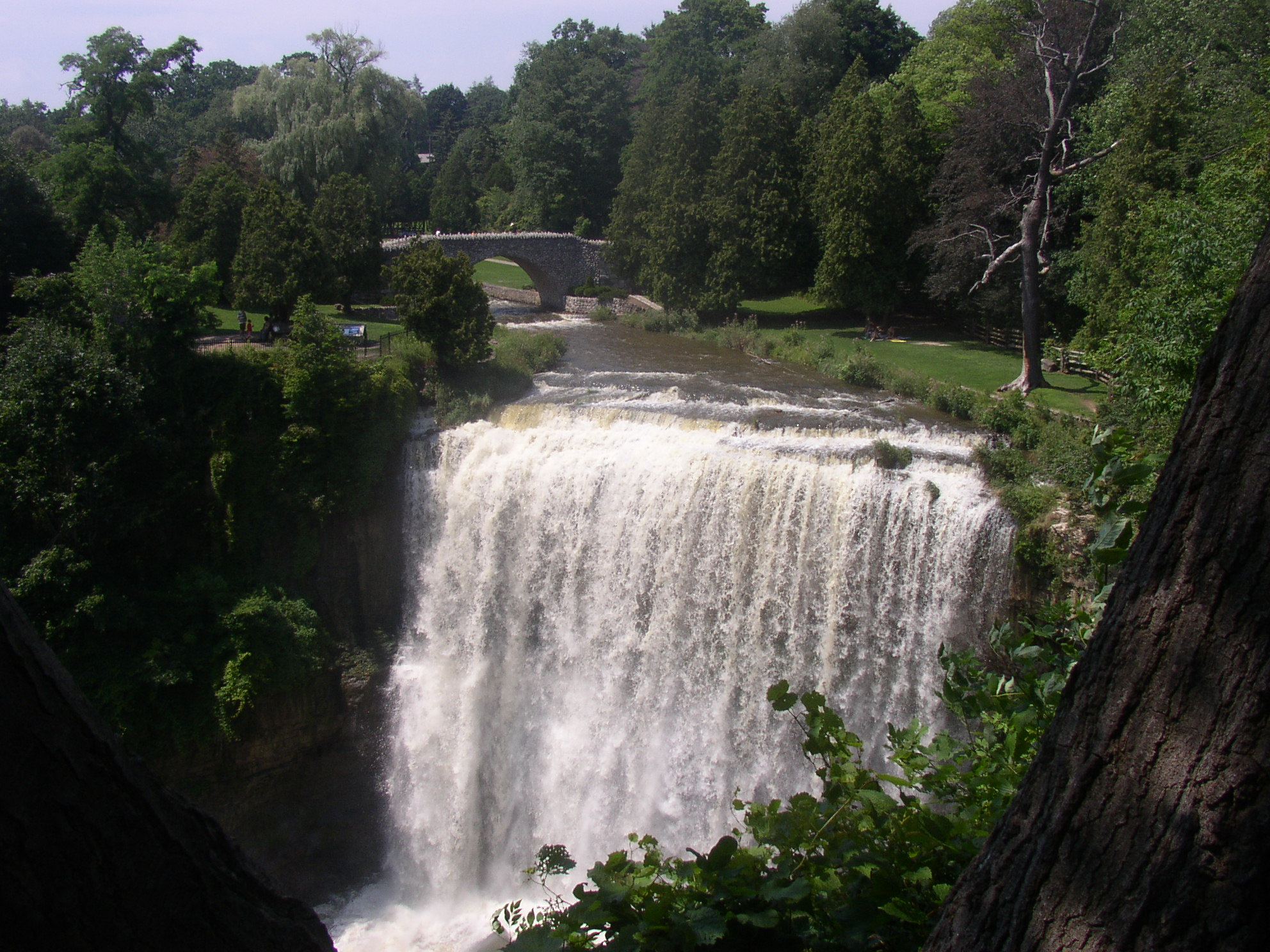
- Webster's Falls in 2006
- Interactive map of Spencer Gorge Conservation Area
- Location: Hamilton, Ontario, Canada
- Coordinates: 43°16′59″N 79°58′0″W
- Established: 1967; 59 years ago
- Governing body: Hamilton Conservation Authority
- Website: Official website

Spencer Gorge Conservation Area is a conservation area located on the Niagara Escarpment in the community of Dundas in Hamilton, Ontario. It is owned and operated by the Hamilton Conservation Authority. It has views over Hamilton and a two major waterfalls that are accessible via a system of trails. The natural features found in the area are considered to be provincially significant. A reservation system is in place during the fall colour season, from late September to early November each year.

== Geology ==
The main feature of the area is the Spencer Gorge, a Y-shaped gorge around 1-kilometre (0.6 mi) in length, with the depth reaching 100 metres (330 ft). The walls of the gorge are very steep, contrasting the gently sloping landscape found in the nearby areas. The gorge was incised by the melt streams of the Wisconsin glaciation about 10,000 years ago. The gorge displays a near-complete stratigraphic section from the red shales of the Queenston Formation to the caprock of the Lockport Formation (dolomite and limestone).

=== Waterfalls ===
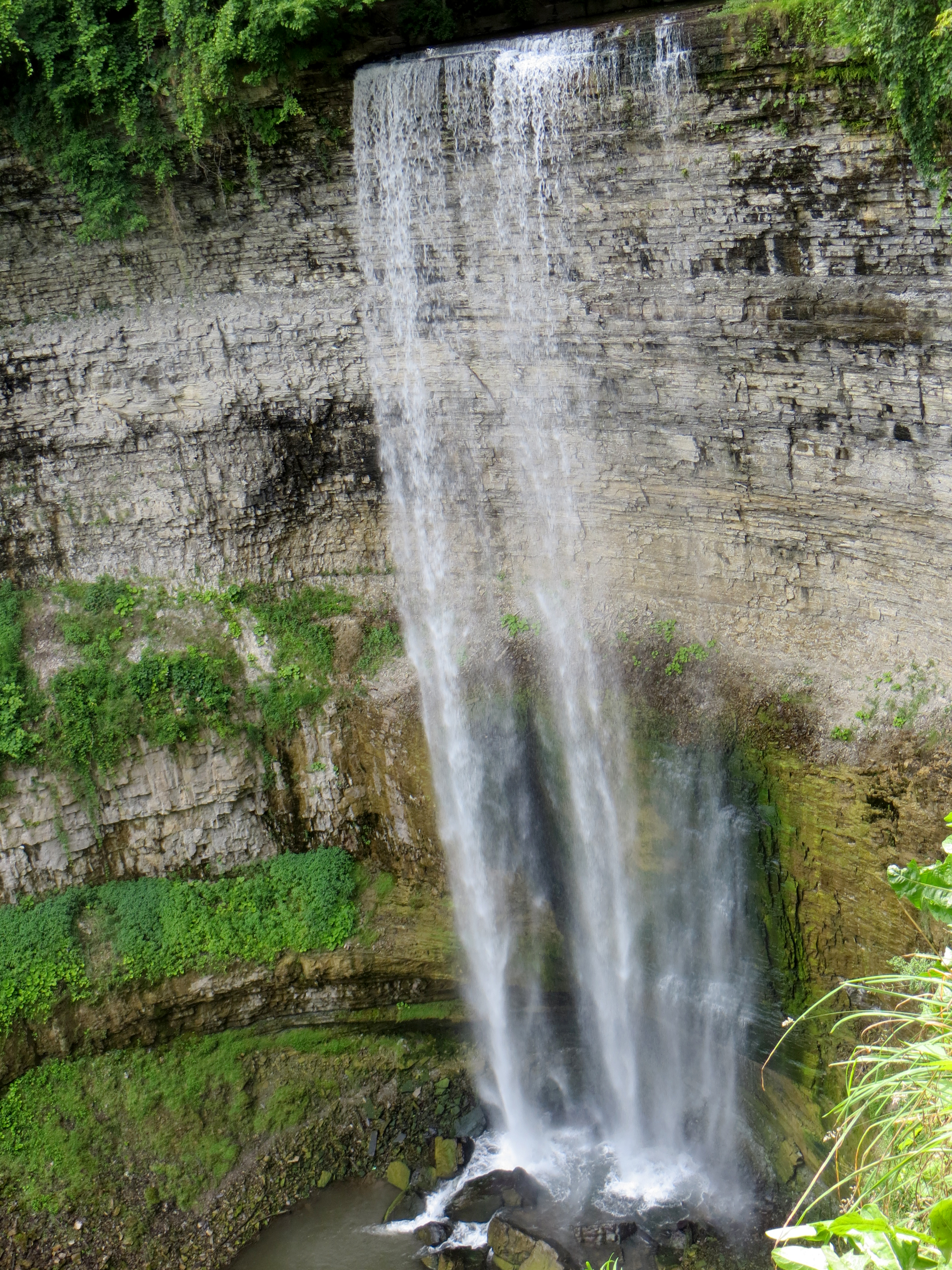
Tews Falls in 2007.

Measuring 41 metres (135 ft) in height, Tew's Falls is the tallest waterfall found in Hamilton, among 96 others. Located at 219 metres (719 ft) above the sea level, it is also the highest waterfall in the city. Webster's Falls is another major waterfall. With its 30 metres (98 ft) crest, it is the largest within the city. The gorge is an excellent example of the process of waterfall recession. At least 10 bowl-shaped basins have been identified within the area, indicating the earlier positions of the waterfall. Some of the largest and the oldest identified basins have the diameter of up to 350 metres (1,150 ft), with depth of up to 60 metres (200 ft), making them comparable to the present state of the Horseshoe Falls.

== See also ==
- List of waterfalls
- List of waterfalls in Hamilton, Ontario
