= Bruce Trail =

Hiking trail in Ontario, Canada

Coordinates: 43°30′26″N 79°55′44″W

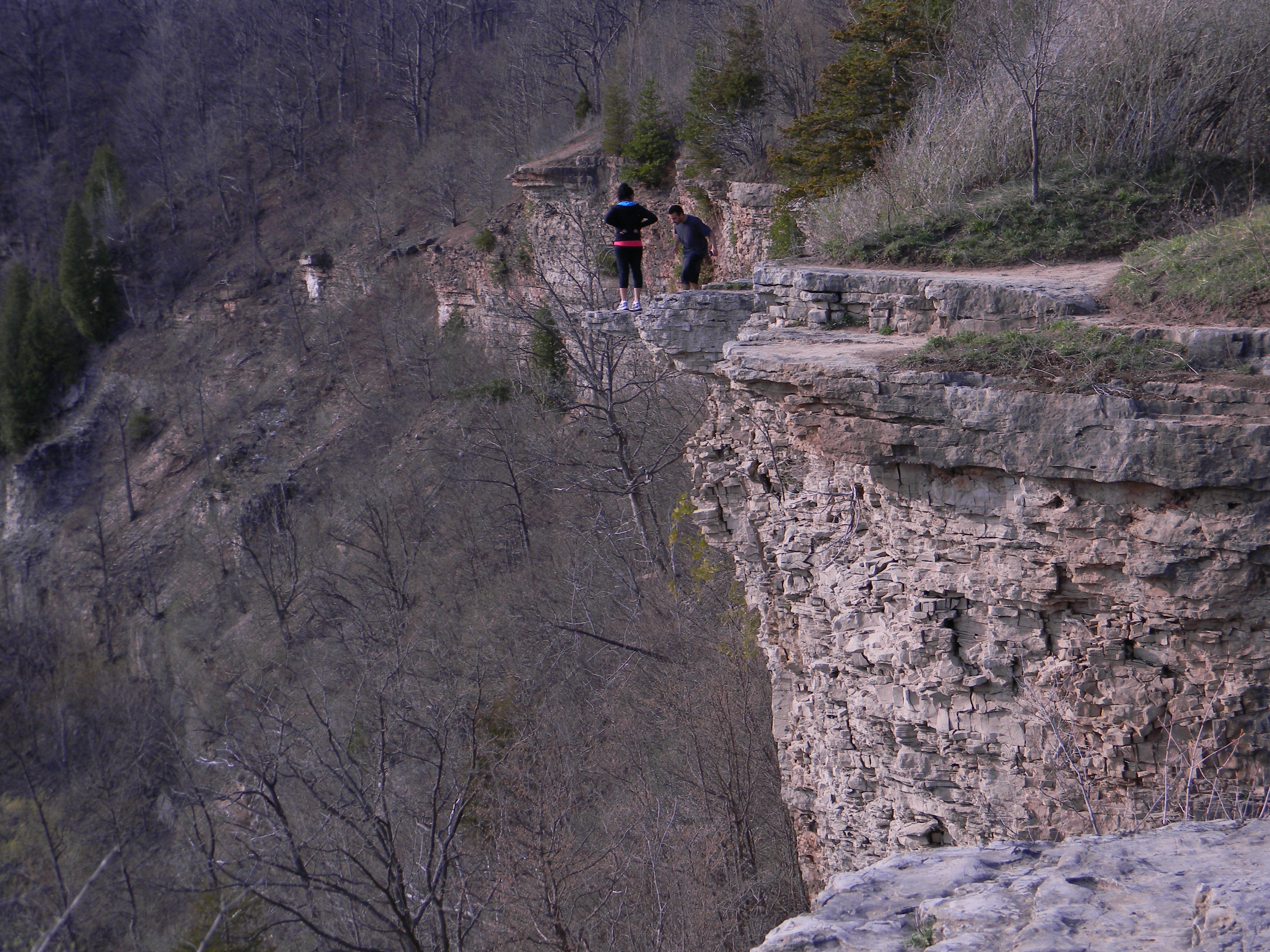
- View from the Niagara Escarpment
- Length: 885 km (550 mi)
- Location: Southwestern Ontario
- Trailheads: Tobermory, Ontario; Queenston, Ontario
- Use: Hiking

The Bruce Trail is a hiking trail in southern Ontario, Canada, from the Niagara River to the tip of Tobermory, Ontario. The main trail is more than 890 km (550 mi) long and there are over 400 km (250 mi) of associated side trails. The trail mostly follows the edge of the Niagara Escarpment, one of the nineteen UNESCO World Biosphere Reserves in Canada. The land the trail traverses is owned by the Government of Ontario, local municipalities, local conservation authorities, private landowners, and the Bruce Trail Conservancy (BTC). The Bruce Trail is the oldest and longest marked hiking trail in Canada. Its name is linked to the Bruce Peninsula and Bruce County, through which the trail runs. The trail is named after the county, which was named after James Bruce, 8th Earl of Elgin who was the Governor General of the Province of Canada from 1847 to 1854.

== History ==
The idea for creating the Bruce Trail came about in 1959 out of a meeting between Ray Lowes and Robert Bateman, of the Federation of Ontario Naturalists. Ray Lowes' vision was of a public footpath that would span the entire Niagara Escarpment.

On September 23, 1960, the first meeting of the Bruce Trail Committee took place, consisting of four attending members—Ray Lowes, Philip Gosling, Norman Pearson, and Dr. Robert McLaren. Each member became instrumental in building the Bruce Trail.

Trail Director Philip Gosling was responsible for gaining access to the Niagara Escarpment. With a team of volunteers, he visited major towns along the proposed route to discuss their vision of the trail and to solicit help from landowners. Their efforts were successful, and by 1963 regional clubs were established along the length of the Trail. Each club was responsible for obtaining landowner approvals, organizing trail construction, and maintenance efforts within their region of the trail.

On March 13, 1963, the Bruce Trail Association was incorporated in Ontario, and the first edition of the Association's newsletter, Bruce Trail News, was published that same year. Membership grew to 200. Dr. Aubrey Diem, an assistant professor of Geography at the University of Waterloo, compiled the first guidebook in 1965. The cairn at the northern terminus of the Bruce Trail in Tobermory was unveiled in 1967 to coincide with Canada's Centennial Year.

In August 2021, the Bruce Trail Conservancy purchased nearly 400 acres of land known as the Maple Cross Nature Reserve, its largest acquisition to date. The new protected area allowed the Bruce Trail to be extended an additional 1.8 kilometres in the Cape Chin area on the Saugeen (Bruce) Peninsula.

== Natural features ==
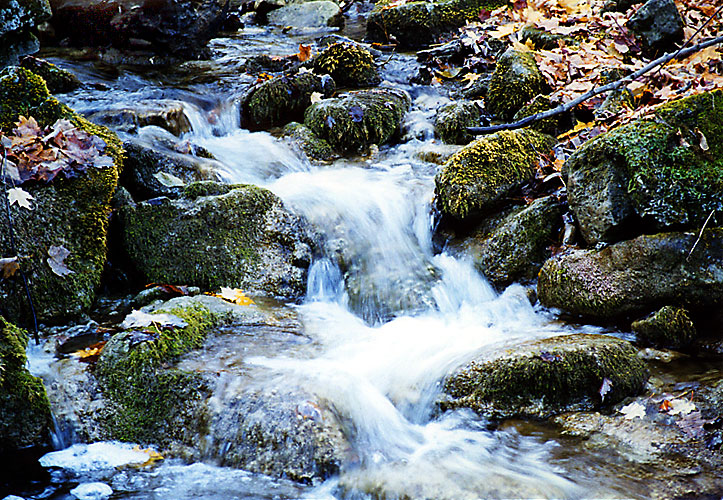
Waterfalls along the Bruce Trail

There are many waterfalls along the Bruce trail, where streams or rivers flow over the Niagara Escarpment. Niagara Falls, by far the most famous water feature in the area, can be reached by a side trail of the Bruce Trail proper. There is also a wide range of plant and wildlife along the trail, including slow-growing centuries-old coniferous trees right on the limestone lip of the escarpment itself. The Cheltenham Badlands is a natural feature exposed by human activity, namely farming.

The Bruce Trail and the escarpment run through some of the most populated areas of Ontario, with an estimated 7 million people living within 100 km (62 mi). Golf courses, housing, and quarries are all examples of the threatening impact that this many people have on the natural environment. The popularity of the trail itself, especially near urban areas, and the careless attitude of some of its users also paradoxically threaten the quality and viability of the trail.

== Route ==
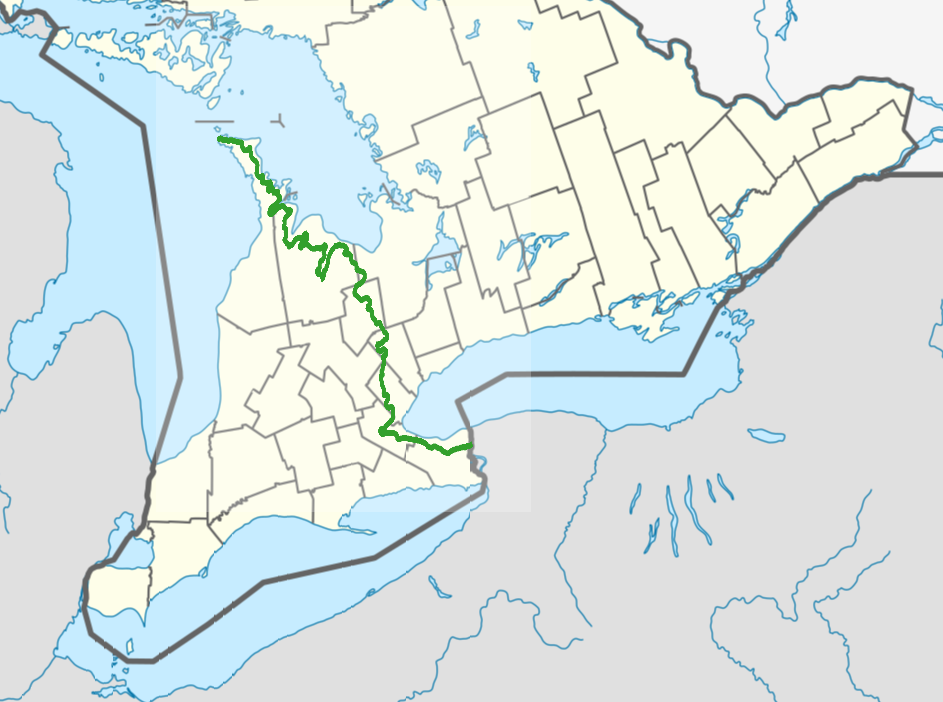
The approximate route of the Bruce Trail

The trail begins in the Niagara Peninsula of Southern Ontario in Queenston, Ontario, on the Niagara River, not far from Niagara Falls. The cairn marking its southern terminus is in a parking lot, about 160 metres (520 ft) from General Brock's Monument on the easterly side of the monument's park grounds. From there, it travels through St. Catharines, where it passes through wine country near the Short Hills Bench. It continues due north through the major towns or cities of Hamilton, Burlington, Milton, Halton Hills, Walters Falls, Owen Sound, Wiarton, and finally Tobermory.

It passes through parks operated by various levels of government, including Woodend Conservation Area in Niagara-on-the-Lake, Battlefield Park in Stoney Creek, Dundas Valley Conservation Area in Dundas, the Hamilton-Brantford Rail Trail, Mount Nemo Conservation Area, Rattlesnake Point Conservation Area, Crawford Lake Conservation Area, Mono Cliffs Provincial Park, and the Bruce Peninsula National Park, which is located between Georgian Bay and Lake Huron near the northern tip of Bruce Peninsula. Its northern terminus is in Tobermory, the jumping off point for Fathom Five National Marine Park.

Approximately half of the trail runs through public land. In order to make a complete connection, the trail runs partly on private property and partly on road allowances. When going through private property, the BTC has made agreements with landowners to allow trail users to pass through, under specific conditions—primarily, that the right of way is restricted to foot traffic only. This is a sensitive issue for the organization, as landowners may withdraw their consent at any time. Using roads is not the best route for the trail. In these sections, the BTC is involved in acquiring land along what it calls the "optimum route."

== Maintenance ==
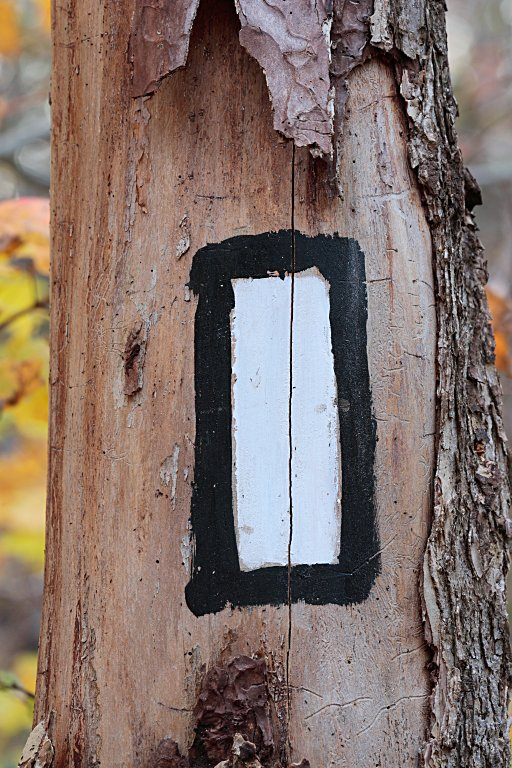
Typical Bruce Trail blaze

The Federation of Ontario Naturalists surveyed the route in the early 1960s, and the responsibility for maintaining the trail was assumed by the nascent Bruce Trail Association; as of 2007, it is called the Bruce Trail Conservancy.

Currently headquartered at 55 Head Street in Dundas, the BTC marks and maintains the main trail as well as many side trails. Trail maintenance includes building bridges over streams and gullies, building stairs and switchbacks to climb slopes, building stiles over fences, and rerouting portions of the trail that have become worn through overuse.

The trail is subdivided into nine sections, each with a subsidiary club:

Club Name	Start	End	Length (km)
Niagara	Queenston	Grimsby	83
Iroquoia	Grimsby	Kelso	122.5
Toronto	Kelso	Cheltenham	50
Caledon	Cheltenham	Mono Centre	72.4
Dufferin Hi-Land	Mono Centre	Lavender	56.3
Blue Mountains	Lavender	Craigleith	70
Beaver Valley	Craigleith	Blantyre	120
Sydenham	Blantyre	Wiarton	170
Peninsula	Wiarton	Tobermory	160

Volunteers inspect, repair, and build footbridges, retaining walls, stiles, and handholds along their section of the route. The BTC and subsidiary clubs offer badges for those hikers who complete the whole trail or any of its sections under prescribed conditions.

The main trail is marked with the BTC logo, a white lozenge with black text and drawings for the Bruce Trail and an upward pointing arrow, which does not act as a part of a navigational marker. The actual blazes for the main trail are white markings, approximately 3 cm (1 in) wide by 8 cm (3 in) high, with turns indicated by stacking two blazes off centre to indicate the direction to take. The blazes for the 300 km (190 mi) of associated side trails are similar, except they are blue.

== Long distance activities ==
The BTC regularly holds events called end to end hikes. These events, which are sometimes held over two to three days, challenge hikers to walk over long sections of the trail daily in order to hike the entire length of the trail within one of the Bruce Trail clubs.

The Bruce Trail has also attracted long-distance runners who attempt to run its entire length. The first Fastest Known Time (FKT) was set in 1995. During the COVID19 pandemic, a number of runners broke the FKT from 2017.

Year	Name	Time	Notes	Support
1995	Scott Turner	14 days, 5 hours, and 58 minutes.		Yes
2010	Charlotte Vasarhelyi	13 days, 10 hours, and 51 minutes		No
2014	Jim Willett	10 days, 13 hours, and 57 minutes		Yes
2017	Chantal Warriner	12 days, 15 hours, and 14 minutes	Former women's FKT	Yes
2017	Adam Burnett	9 days, 21 hours, and 14 minutes		Yes
2020	John Harrison Pockler	9 days, 17 hours, and 2 minutes		Yes
2021 (July)	Kip Arlidge	9 days, 3 hours, and 27 minutes		Yes
2021 (September)	Karen Holland	8 days, 22 hours, 15 minutes	Current women's FKT	Yes
2022 (May)	Elias Kibreab	8 days, 16 hours, 55 minutes	Current men's FKT	Yes

The Highlands Trailblazers Nordic Ski Team completed a relay-style run of the entire trail in 8 days, starting in Tobermory on June 24, 2008, and finishing in Queenston on July 1, 2008. This run was both a training event as well as a fundraiser for the team. In 2009, two 10-person teams running continuously in an event called the Blaze Race set a new end-to-end relay record of 3 days, 23 hours, and 10 minutes.

In 2012, adventure seekers Fred Losani, Peter Turkstra, Mark Maclennan, and Teemu Lakkasuo went on a quest to raise funds and awareness for inner-city food and nutrition programs in Hamilton, as well as the Bruce Trail Conservancy as they celebrate 50 years. The adventure began on September 24, 2012, in Queenston, in the Niagara region, and ended approximately one month later in Tobermory. Along the way the hikers had the opportunity to walk with students, interact via live webcam and satellite phone transmissions, and educate students about the importance of proper nutrition, healthy living, and maintaining the Bruce Trail.

== Books about the Trail ==
- The Bruce Trail Reference: Maps and Trail Guide. 31st edition (2023). The official handbook of the Trail. It comes as a three-ring binder containing a great deal of background information about the Trail as well as detailed fold-out maps of each section of the Trail that can be easily removed to accompany hikes. Updated every few years.
- Trail to the Bruce: The Story of the Building of the Bruce Trail (2017) by David E. Tyson. A detailed history of how the Trail in its present form came to exist.
- The Bruce Trail End to End: Niagara to Tobermory the Hard Way (2021) by Nicholas Ruddick. A photographic documentary of a hike along the entire Trail, with 300 illustrations. A paperback based on the author’s 72-part online photoblog.
- Walking through Time (2023-) by Beth Gilhespy. An ongoing series of books exploring the geology of the Niagara Escarpment on the various sections of the Bruce Trail.

== See also ==
- List of trails in Canada
