= Albion (disambiguation) =

Albion is an archaic and poetic name for the island of Great Britain.

Albion may also refer to:

== Arts and entertainment ==
=== Fictional elements ===
- Albion (Blake), a character in the poetry of William Blake
- Albion, a High School DxD character
- HMS Albion, a playable character in the mobile gacha game Azur Lane
- Albion, the fictional setting of Fable (video game series)
- Albion, a place in the game Destroy All Humans! 2
- Albion, a realm in the game Dark Age of Camelot
- Albion, a nation of Warhammer Fantasy
- Albion, a private security company in Watch Dogs: Legion
- Albion (Marvel Comics), a character
- Albion, a setting in The Familiar of Zero Japanese light novels by Noboru Yamaguchi
- Albion, a sword in Robin of Sherwood
- Albion, a gang in Captain Earth

=== Games ===
- Albion (video game), a 1995 game and its fictional setting
- Albion Online, a 2017 medieval fantasy MMORPG
- X3: Albion Prelude, a 2011 space flight simulator whose main storyline heavily features a planet named Albion (also central in the sequel X Rebirth)

=== Literature ===
- Albion (comics), a 2005 comic-book limited series
- Albion (novel series), a trilogy of historical novels by Patrick McCormack
- Albion (magazine), devoted to the board game Diplomacy, published from 1969 to 1975

=== Music ===
- The Albion Band, a former English folk band
- Ferry Corsten or Albion, electronic music producer/DJ
- Albion: An Anthology, a 2009 compilation album by the English folk musician and composer Chris Wood
- Albion (Ginger Wildheart album), 2013
- Albion (Ten album), 2014
- "Albion" (song), 2005, by Babyshambles
- "Albion", a piece for brass band by Jan Van der Roost
- Albion, a 2013 album by Ginger Wildheart

== Businesses ==
- Albion Co., Ltd., a Japanese cosmetics manufacturer and distributor
- Albion Ale House, a Grade II listed public house in Conwy, North Wales
- Albion Brewery, also known as Albion Ale And Porter Brewing Company, a former beer brewery in San Francisco, active 1870 to 1919
- Albion Colliery, a former coal mine in Wales
- Albion Fine Foods, a British company owned by Vestey Holdings
- Albion Hotel (disambiguation)
- Hotel Albion, Portland, Oregon, US
- Albion Motors, a vehicle manufacturer in Glasgow, Scotland 1899–1980
- Albion Swords, an American company manufacturing European sword replicas
- Albion, a brand of agricultural machinery by David Brown Ltd.
- Albion Shipping Company, a 19th-century shipping company of P Henderson & Company
- Albion Yard, a Charles Hill & Sons shipbuilding yard in Bristol, England, 1848–1977

== People ==
- Albion (given name), including list of people with the name
- Robert G. Albion (1896–1983), Harvard's first professor of Oceanic History

== Places ==
=== Australia ===
- Albion, Queensland, a suburb of Brisbane
- Albion, Queensland (Richmond Shire), a locality
- Albion, Victoria, a suburb of Melbourne
- Albion Park, New South Wales, a suburb of Shellharbour

=== Canada ===
- Albion, British Columbia, a neighbourhood of Maple Ridge
- Albion Falls, Ontario, a waterfall
- Albion Township, Ontario, in the town of Caledon, in the Greater Toronto Area

=== United States ===
- Albion, California, a census-designated place
- Albion River, California
- Albion, Idaho, a city
- Albion, Illinois, a city
- Albion Precinct, Edwards County, Illinois, a defunct precinct
- Albion, Indiana, a town
- Albion, Scott County, Indiana, an unincorporated community
- Albion, Iowa, a city
- Albion, Kansas, a ghost town
- Albion, Maine, a town
- Albion, Michigan, a city
- Albion, an early name in the history of Minneapolis, Minnesota
- Albion, Nebraska, a city
- Albion, New Jersey, an unincorporated community
- Albion, Orleans County, New York, a town
  - Albion (village), New York
- Albion, Oswego County, New York, a town
- Albion, North Carolina, an unincorporated community
- Albion, Ohio, an unincorporated community
- Albion, Oklahoma, a town
- Albion, Pennsylvania, a borough
- Albion, Rhode Island, a village and historic district in Lincoln
- Albion (Winnsboro, South Carolina), a plantation home
- Albion, Texas, an unincorporated community
- Albion, Washington, a town
- Albion, Dane County, Wisconsin, a town
  - Albion (community), Wisconsin, an unincorporated community
- Albion, Jackson County, Wisconsin, a town
- Albion, Trempealeau County, Wisconsin, a town
- Albion Township (disambiguation)

=== Elsewhere ===
- Mount Albion (disambiguation)
- Albion, Guyana, a town
- Albion, Mauritius, a village
- 15760 Albion, a minor planet

== Schools ==
- Albion College, a liberal arts college in Albion, Michigan, US
- Albion State Normal School, a former public institution of higher learning in Albion, Idaho, US
- Albion High School (disambiguation)
- Albion Academy, a former academy in Albion, Wisconsin, US
- The Albion Academy, a coeducational secondary school in Pendleton, Salford, England

== Ships ==
- List of ships named Albion
- HMS Albion, the name of several Royal Navy ships
- Albion-class ship of the line (1763)
- Albion-class ship of the line (1842)
- Albion-class landing platform dock

== Sports ==
=== UK ===
- Albion Rovers F.C., a Scottish Football League team from the North Lanarkshire town of Coatbridge
- Albion Rovers F.C. (Newport), a Welsh football team from the city of Newport
- Brighton & Hove Albion F.C., an English professional football club based in the city of Brighton & Hove, Sussex
- Burton Albion F.C., a professional English association football club based in the town of Burton upon Trent, Staffordshire
- Forfar Albion F.C., a Scottish football club based in Forfar, Angus
- Ossett Albion A.F.C., an English football team in the Northern Premier League Division One North, based in Ossett, West Yorkshire
- Plymouth Albion R.F.C., a rugby union club who play in Plymouth, England
- Shepshed Albion F.C., a defunct English football club also known as Shepshed Charterhouse from 1975 to 1992
- Stirling Albion F.C., a Scottish football club currently playing in the Scottish First Division
- Tadcaster Albion A.F.C., an English football club based in Tadcaster, North Yorkshire
- West Bromwich Albion F.C., an English professional association football club based in West Bromwich, West Midlands
- Witton Albion F.C., an English football team in the Northern Premier League Division One North based in Northwich, Cheshire

=== Elsewhere ===
- Albion Football Club (WRFL), an Australian rules football club based in the Melbourne suburb of Albion
- Albion Cricket Club (Dunedin), a cricket club based in Dunedin, New Zealand
- Albion F.C., a football club based in Montevideo, Uruguay
- Albion San Diego, a football club based in San Diego, California, US

== Transportation ==
- Albion Motors, a Scottish automobile and commercial vehicle manufacturer
- Albion Municipal Airport, Albion, Nebraska, US
- Albion railway station (disambiguation)
- Albion Road (disambiguation)
- Albion Viaduct, a railway viaduct in Melbourne, Australia

== Other uses ==
- Albion Correctional Facility, a medium security women's prison in Albion, New York, US
- Operation Albion, a 1917 German operation to occupy the West Estonian Archipelago
- Albion (Blake), the primeval man in William Blake's mythology
- Alebion or Albion, a son of Poseidon in Greek mythology
- Albion (Winnsboro, South Carolina), US, a plantation house
- Albion (journal), a former peer-reviewed journal about British history
- Albion: The Origins of the English Imagination, a 2002 non-fiction work by Peter Ackroyd
- Albion, an equatorium constructed by Richard of Wallingford in 1326

== See also ==
- Albion Park, New South Wales, Australia, a suburb
- Albiones, a pre-Roman Celtic tribe of the Iberian Peninsula
- Blue Albion, a breed of cattle
- Albon (disambiguation)
- Albone (disambiguation)
- New Albion (disambiguation)
