= Albon =

Albon may refer to:

- Albon (surname)
- Albon (medication)
- Albon, Drôme, a commune of southeastern France
  - Château d'Albon, a ruined castle in Albon, Drôme

== See also ==
- Albion (disambiguation)
- Albone (disambiguation)
