= King's Forest Park =

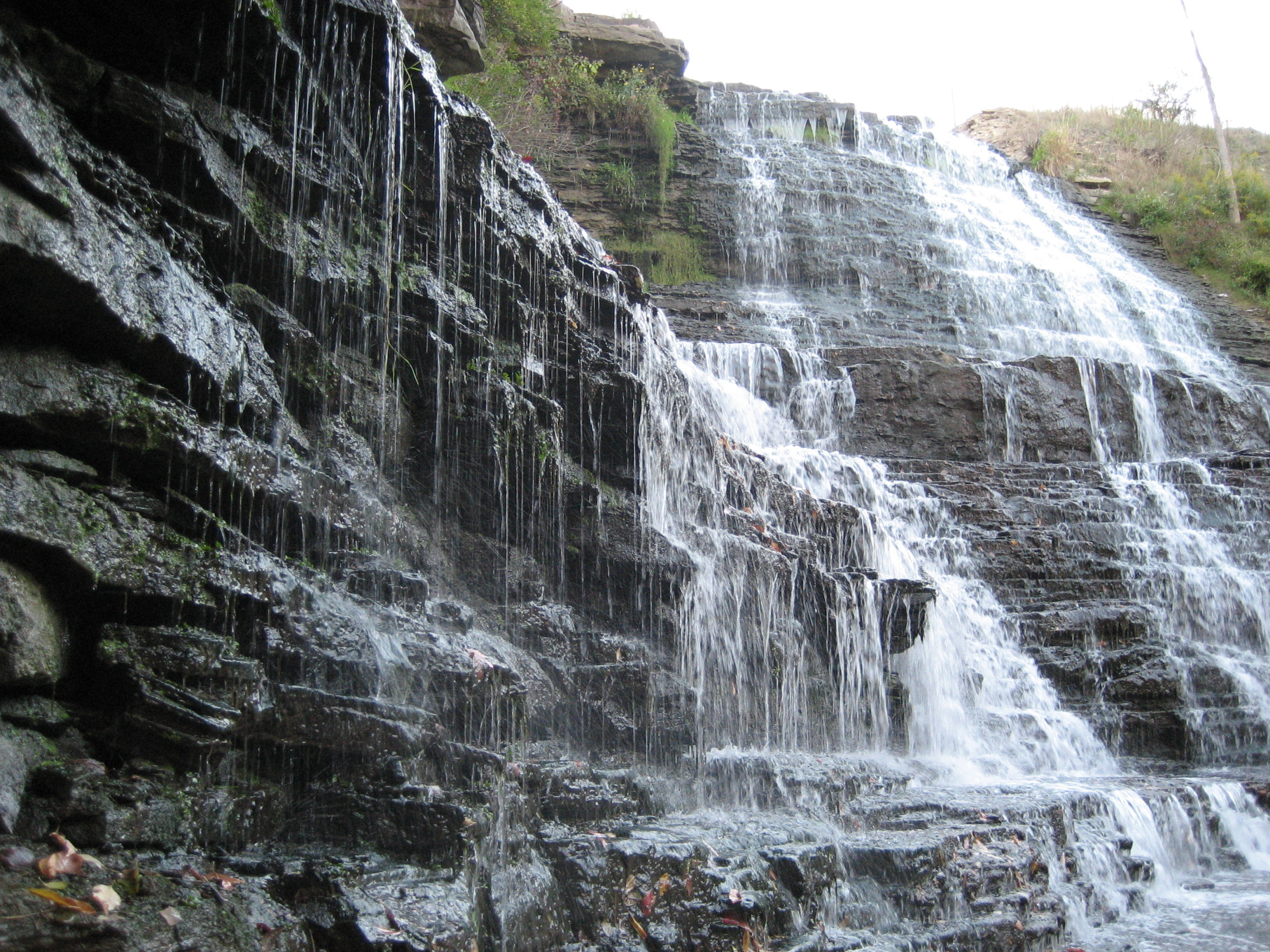
Albion Falls, King's Forest Park

King's Forest Park is a park in Hamilton, Ontario. It was commissioned as part of the City Beautiful movement, spearheaded in Hamilton by the Hamilton Parks Board with the leadership of Thomas McQuesten.

== Environs ==
Albion Falls, a classical/cascade waterfall, and one of Hamilton's 100+ waterfalls, is at the back-end of King's Forest Park. A nearby parking lot was removed when the construction of the nearby Red Hill Valley Parkway started. A parking lot at Mountain Brow Road above the falls for 50+ cars is still available for visitors. A small village called Albion Mills existed here until the early 1900s. The rocks from the Albion Falls area were used to construct the Rock Garden at the Royal Botanical Gardens. Another waterfall can be found nearby, northwest of Albion Falls called, Buttermilk Falls. Not too far off and just east of the newly built Red Hill Valley Parkway at the Glendale Golf & Country Club is another waterfall called Glendale Falls on Mount Albion Road.

King's Forest Golf Club was established in 1974 and is run by the city of Hamilton. The course is marked by Red Hill creek and many fair-sized ponds which come into play.

== 1960s zoo proposal ==
In September 1961 the city's board of control authorized the formation of a zoo committee to look into the proposal of building a zoo at Kings Forest, an idea that had been mooted for the previous decade. A site was selected at the south end of King's Forest, in the Red Hill Valley, and plans were drawn up in January 1963 by local architect Charles Lenz for a "Proposed Royal Zoological Park in the King's Forest". His design incorporated moat- and rail- surrounded land animal enclosures surrounding ponds for birds, with a few small buildings for administration and suchlike and an encircling ring road with radial footpaths inwards therefrom. As an attempt to mollify critics of zoos, which included the Citizens Against a Hamilton Zoo lobbying group, the zoo plans incorporated a new headquarters building for the SPCA. The Board of Parks Management set aside 25 acres (10 ha) in April 1963 for the project.

The project failed for two reasons. First, the city's budget was cut and could no longer afford the projected US$405,000 (equivalent to $4,106,057 in 2024) cost of the initial phase of the zoo construction. Second, the planned Red Hill Valley Parkway was re-routed in March 1964 over some of the land that had been set aside for the zoo, and in September 1964 the Board of Parks Management informed the zoo committee that the land not allocated for the Parkway was no longer going to be set aside for a zoo, because the Parkway plans plus the (then) proposed hydro-electric towers were already set to consume a sizeable chunk of Red Hill Valley.

== Images ==
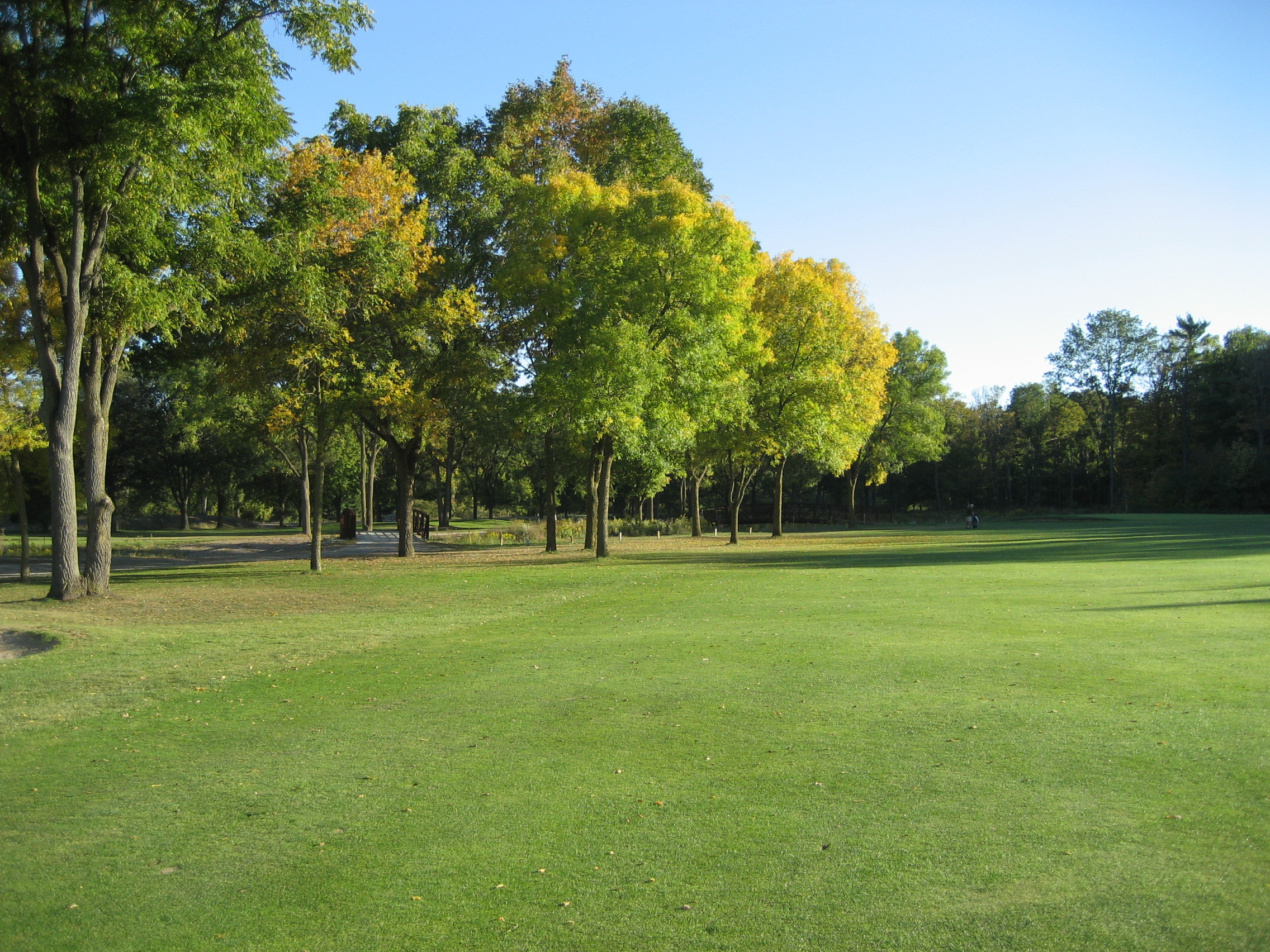
King's Forest Golf Course

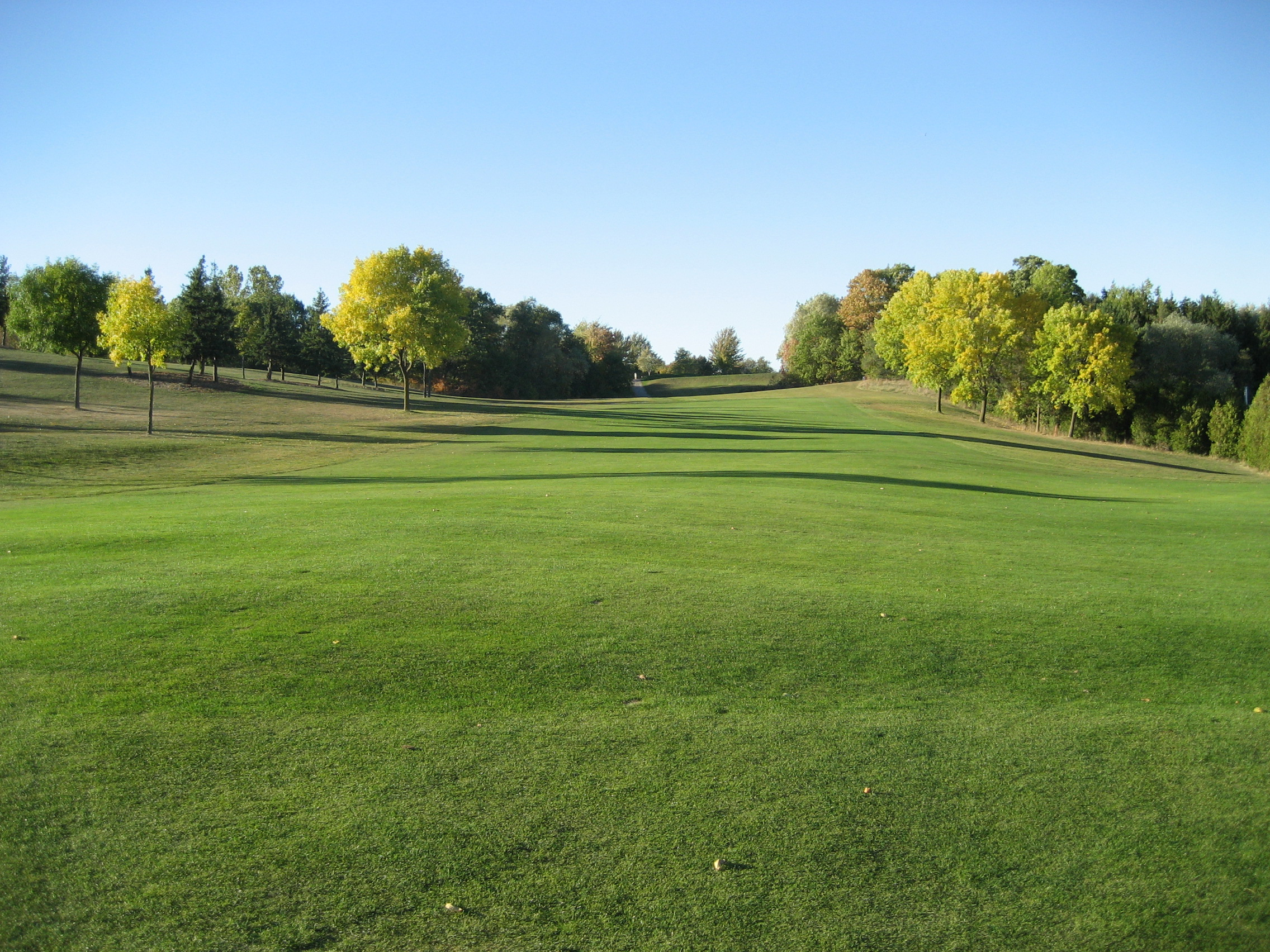
King's Forest Golf Course

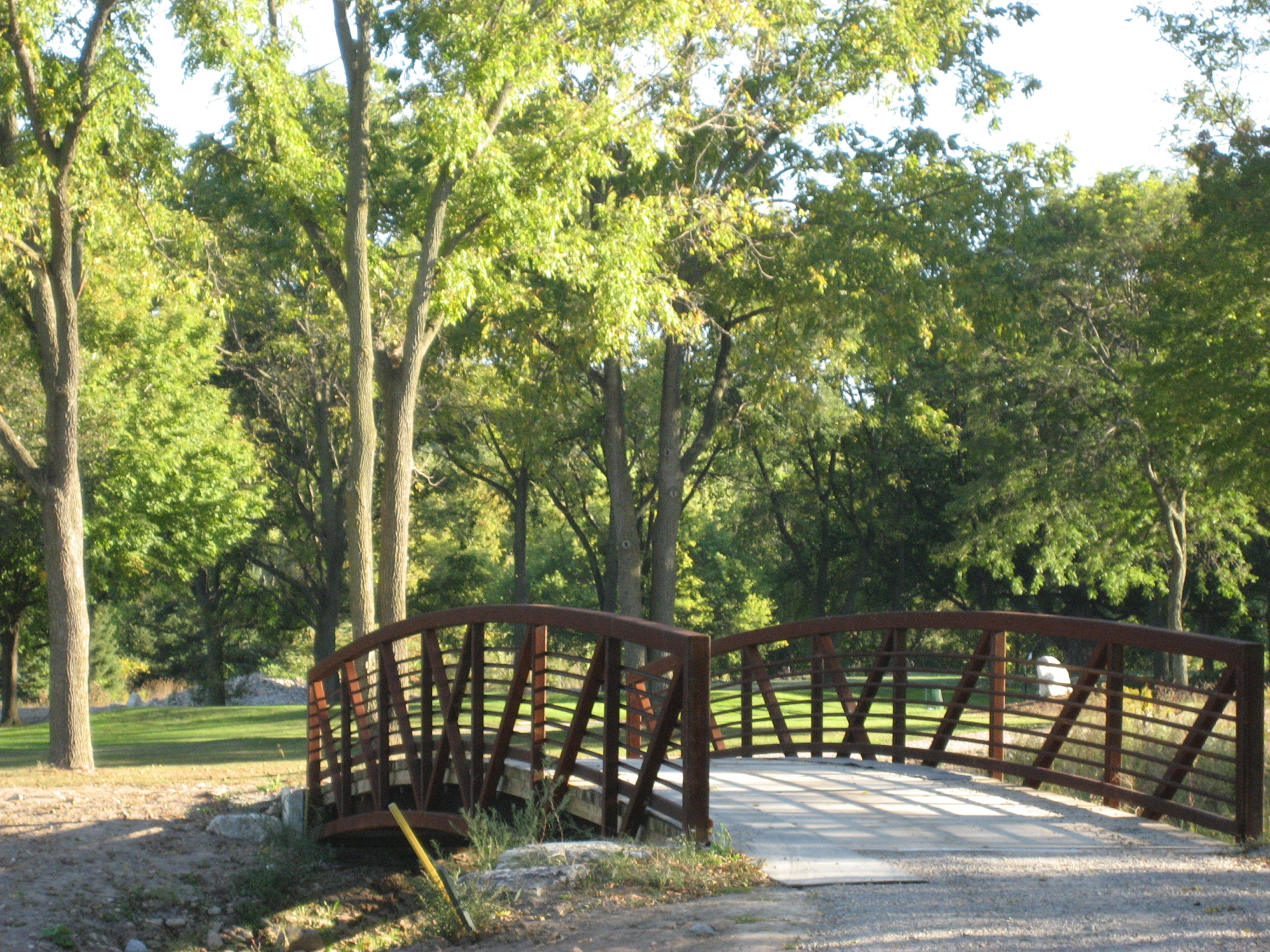
Bridge over Red Hill Creek, King's Forest Park

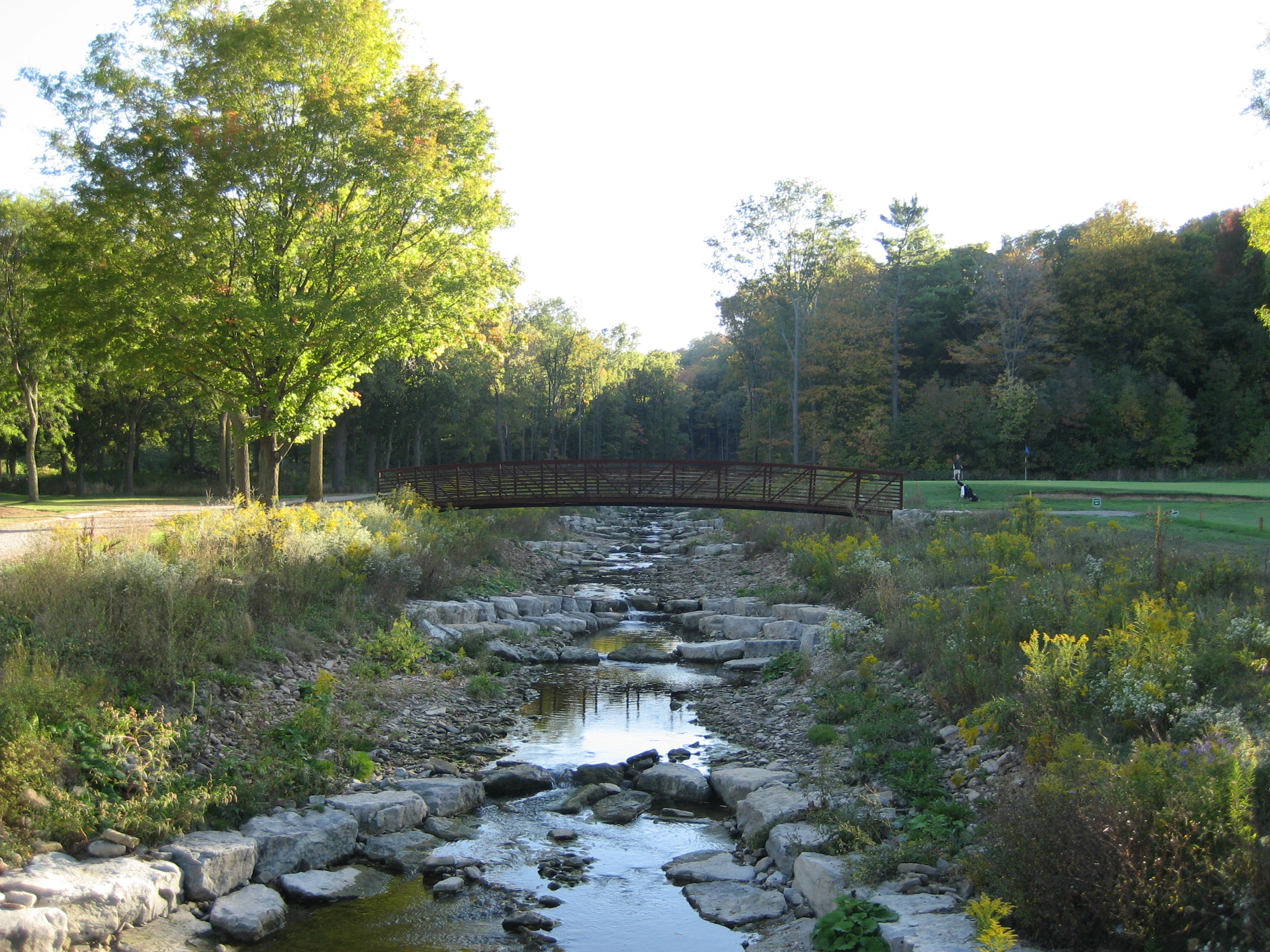
King's Forest Park, looking South

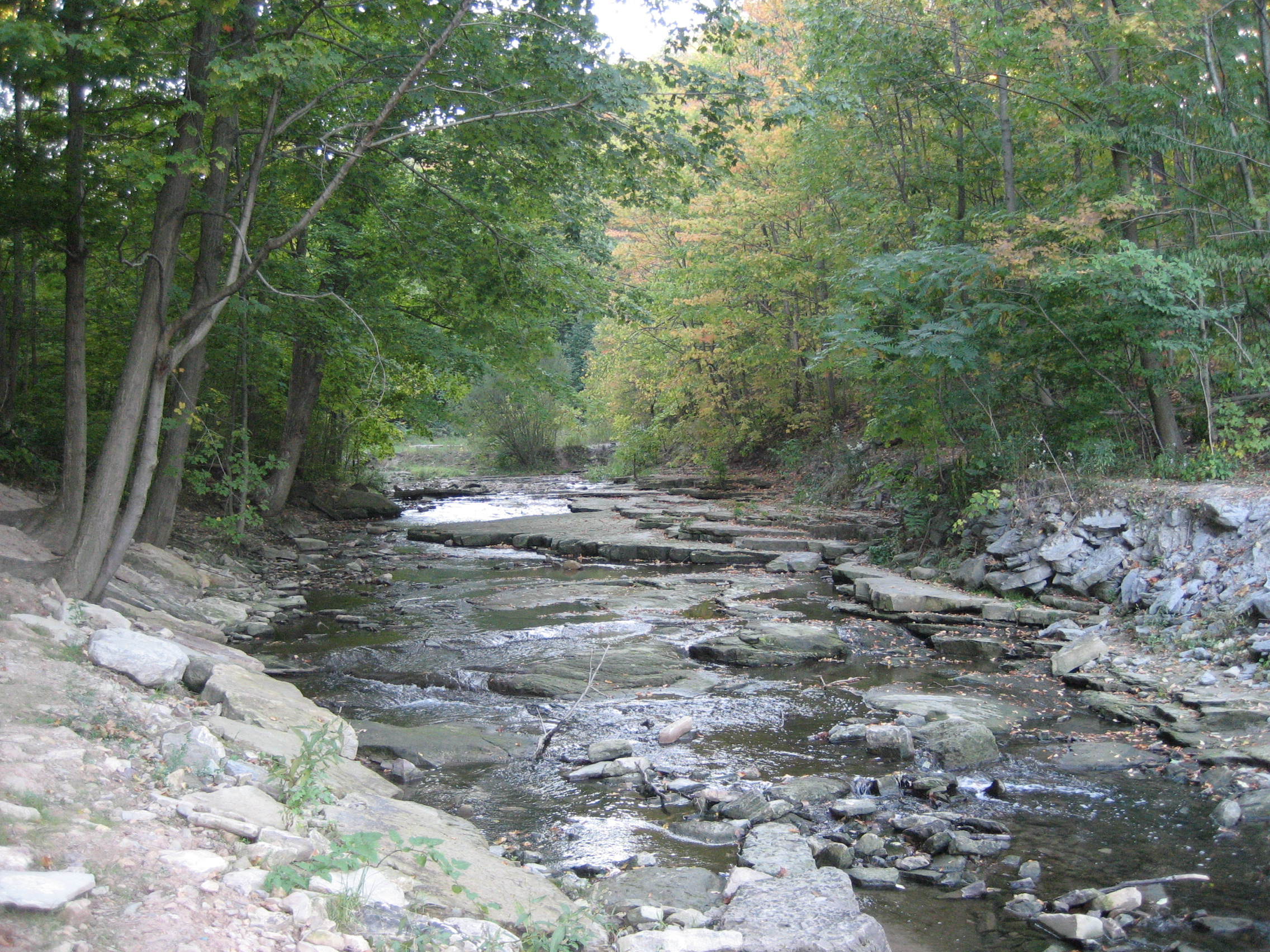
Red Hill Creek, King's Forest Park

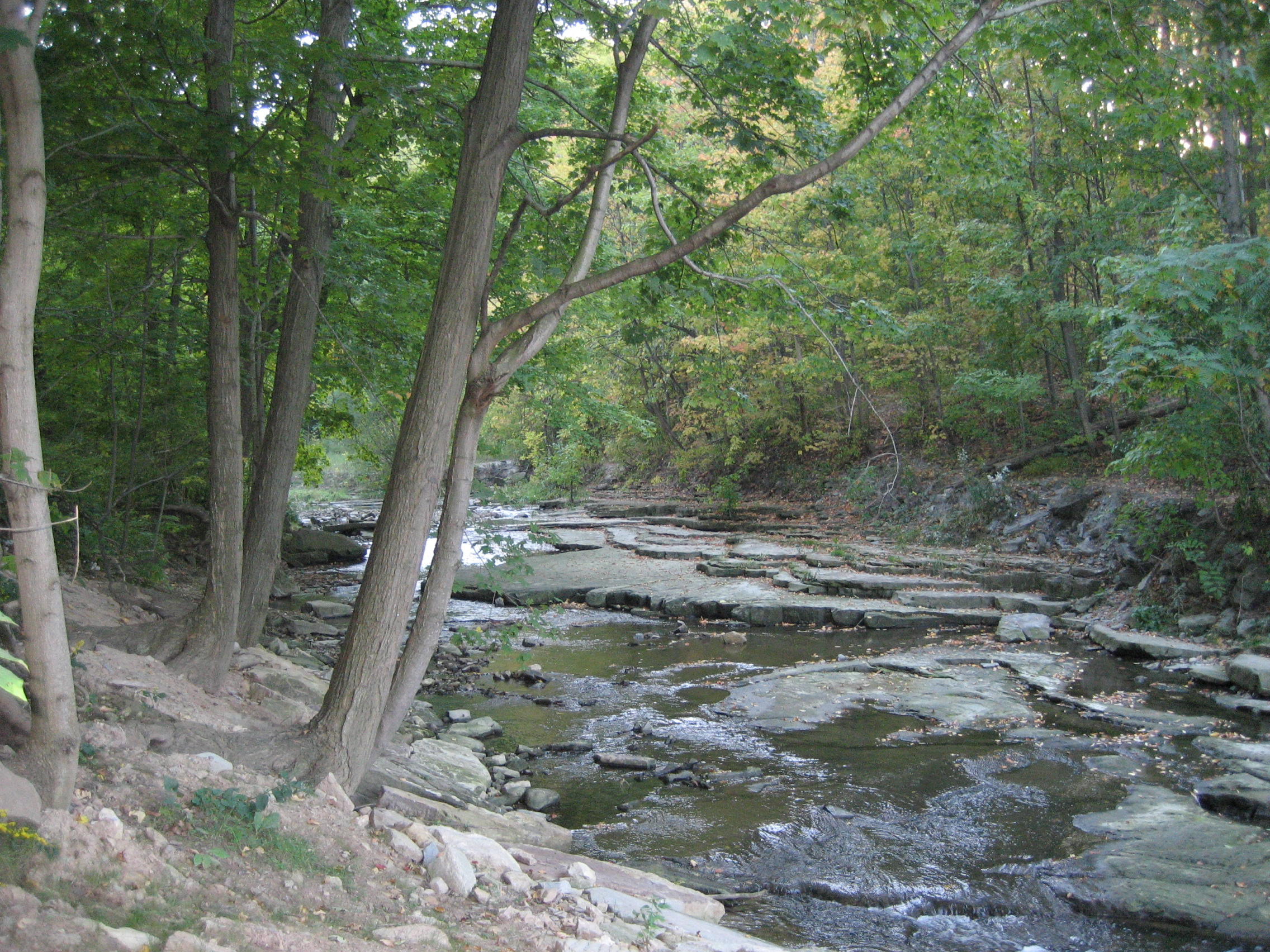
Red Hill Creek, King's Forest Park

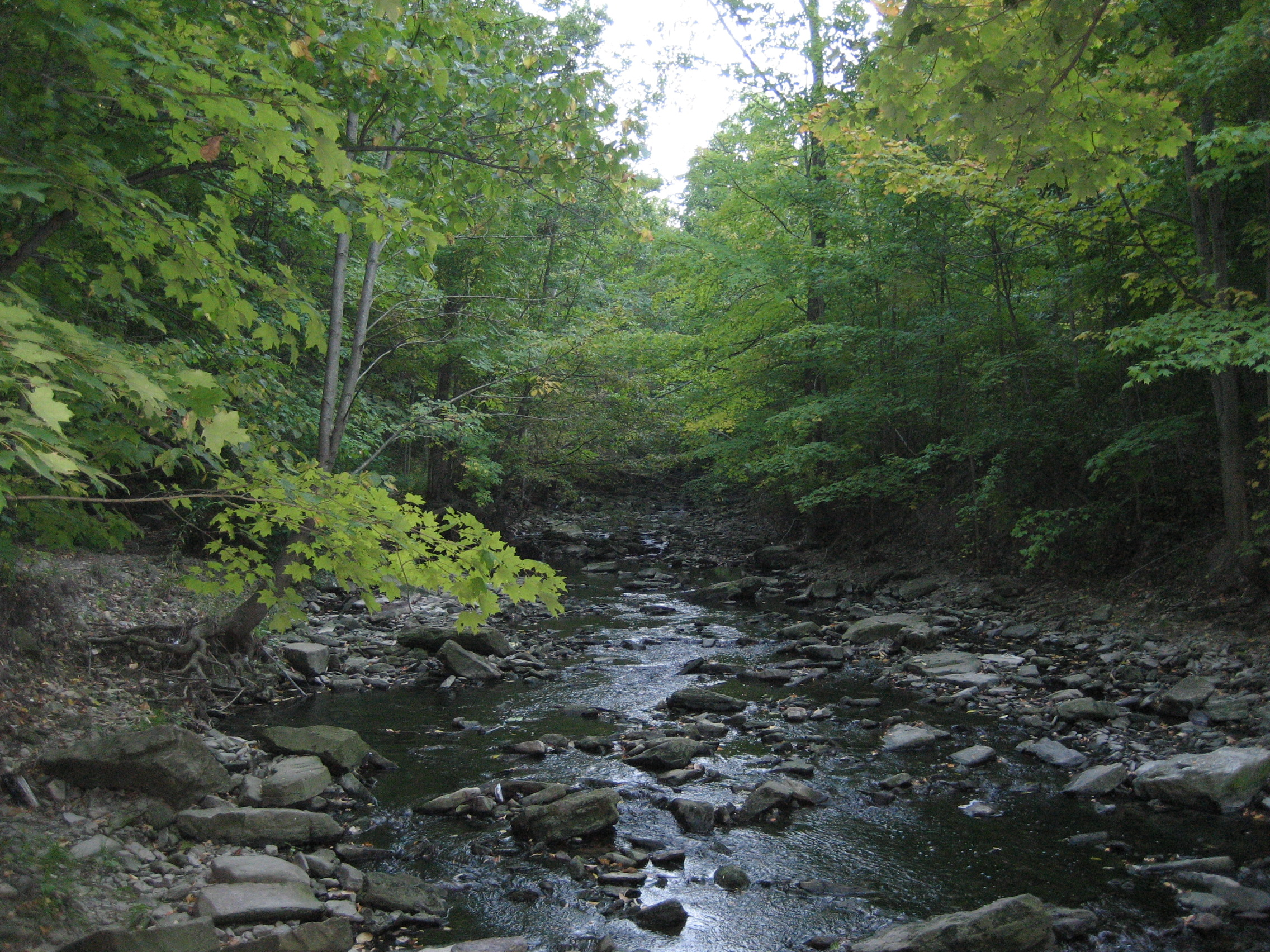
Red Hill Creek, King's Forest Park

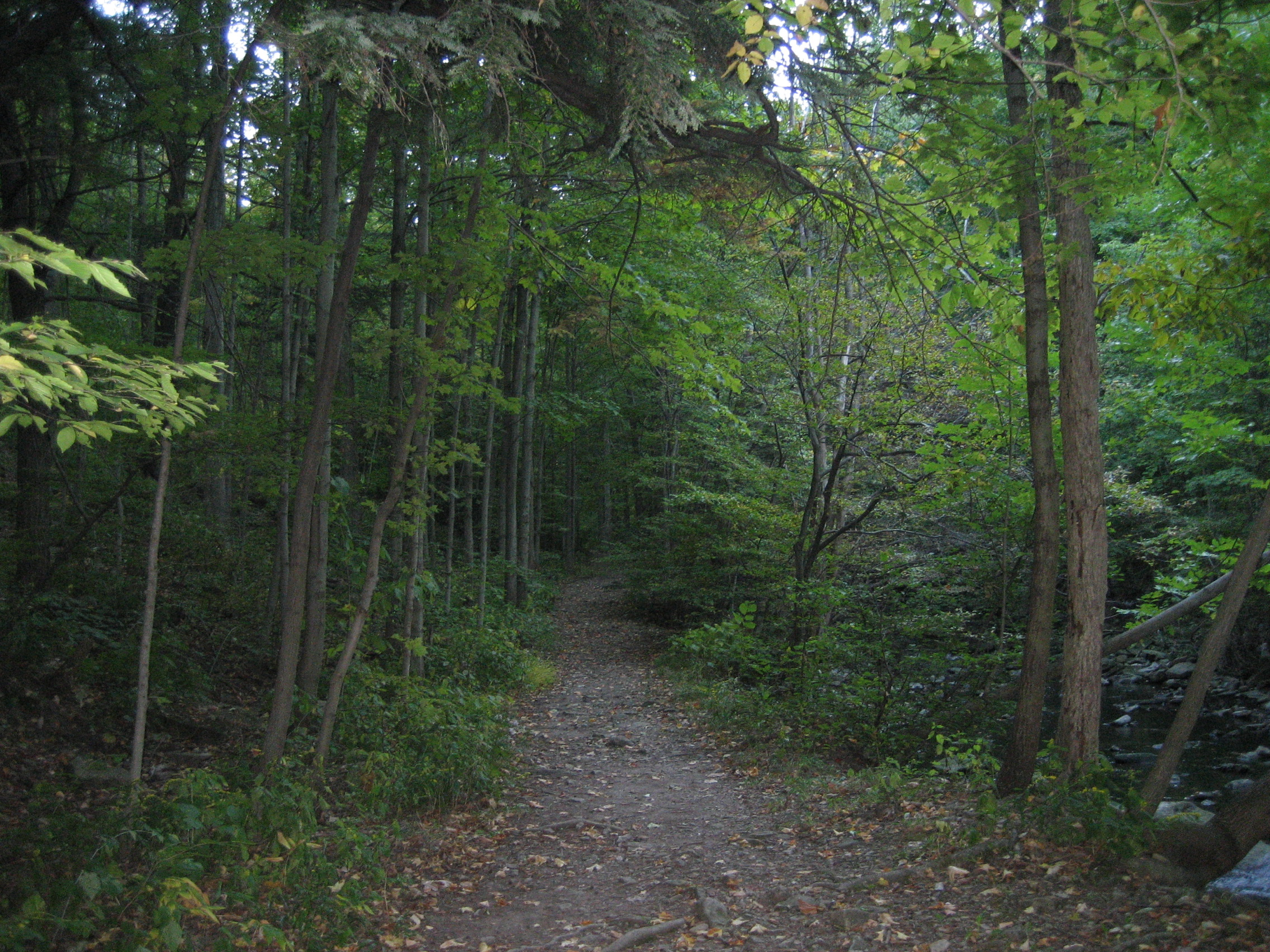
Bruce Trail, King's Forest Park

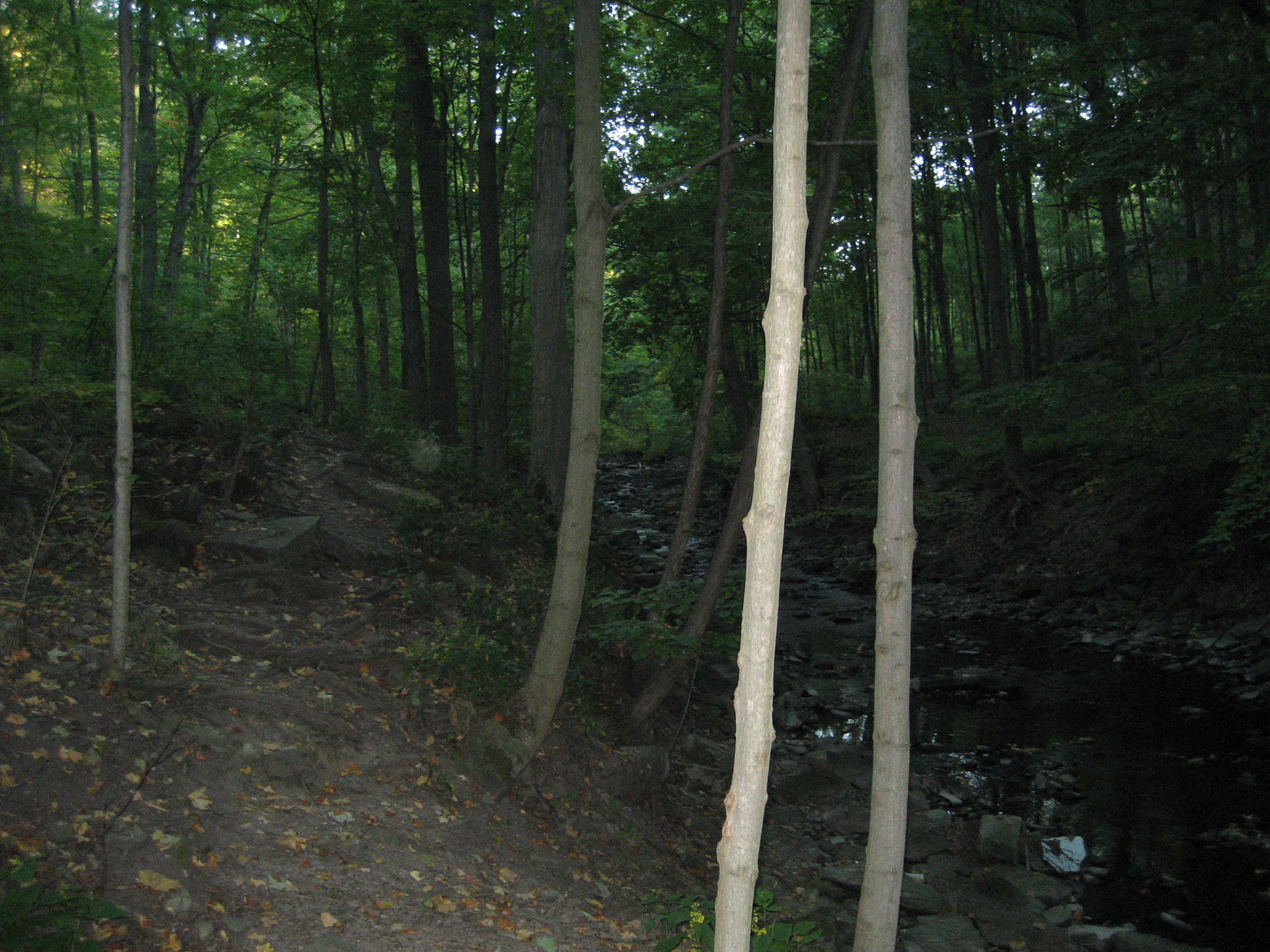
Bruce Trail, King's Forest Park

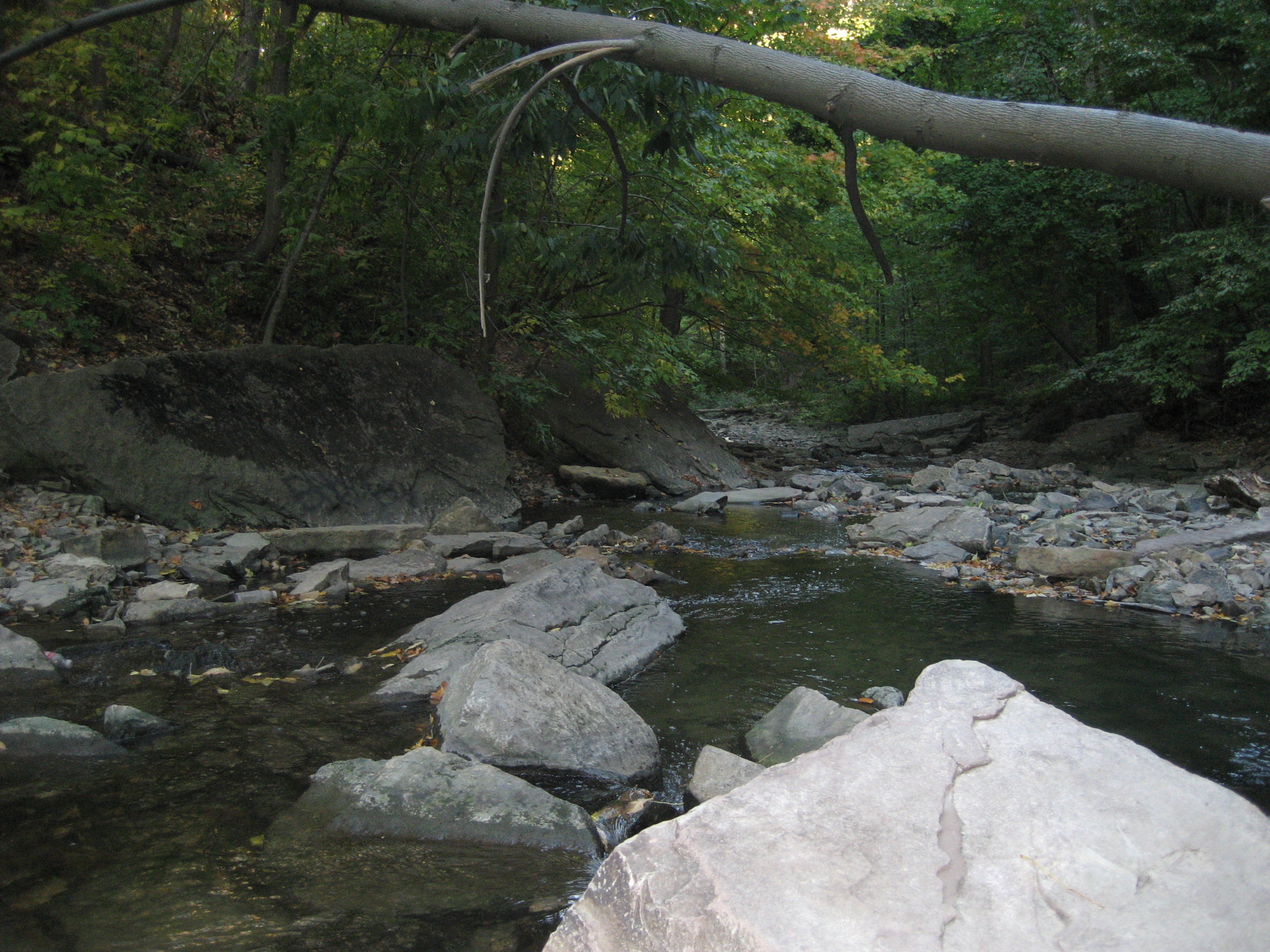
Red Hill Creek, King's Forest Park

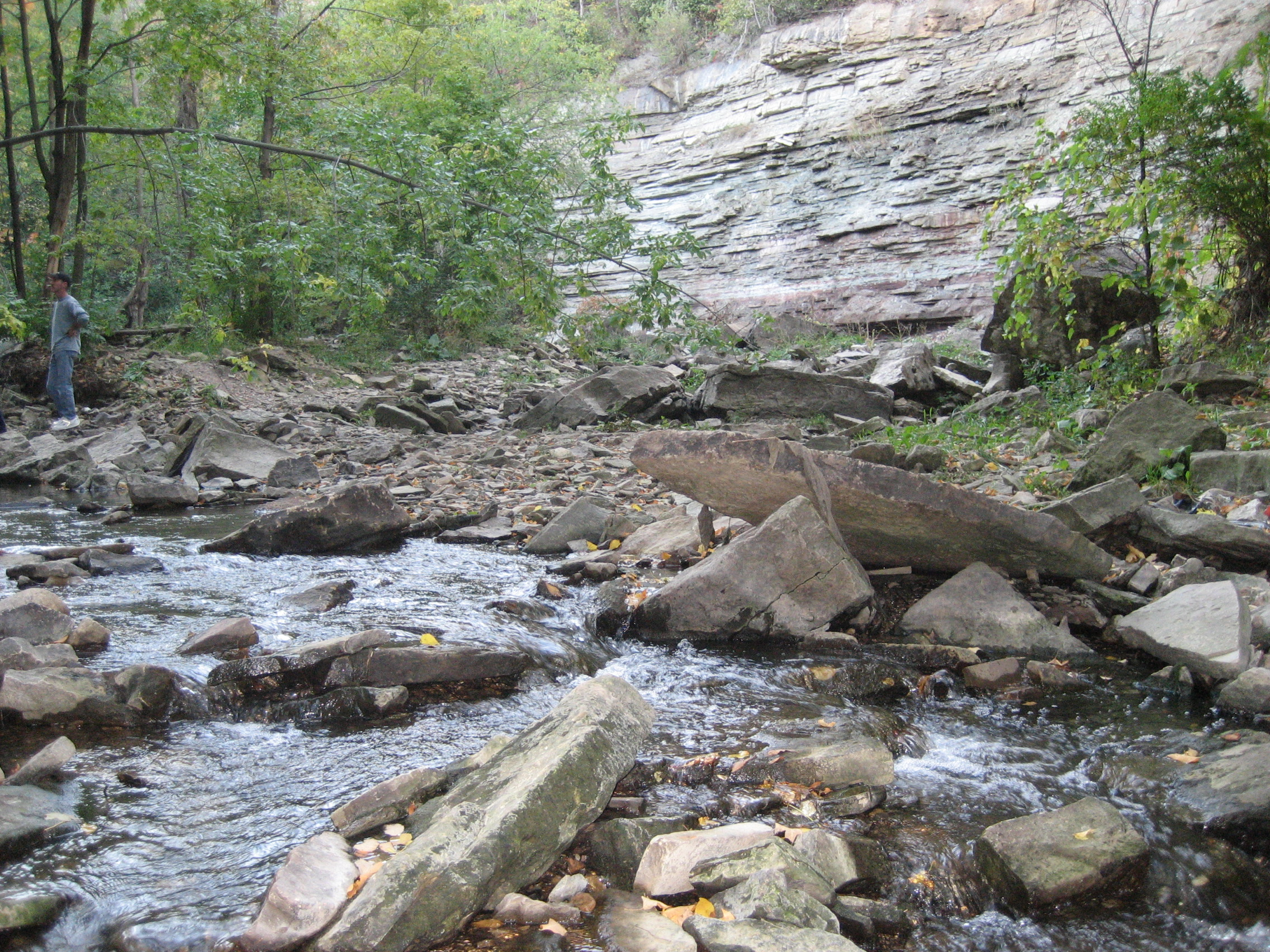
Red Hill Creek, King's Forest Park

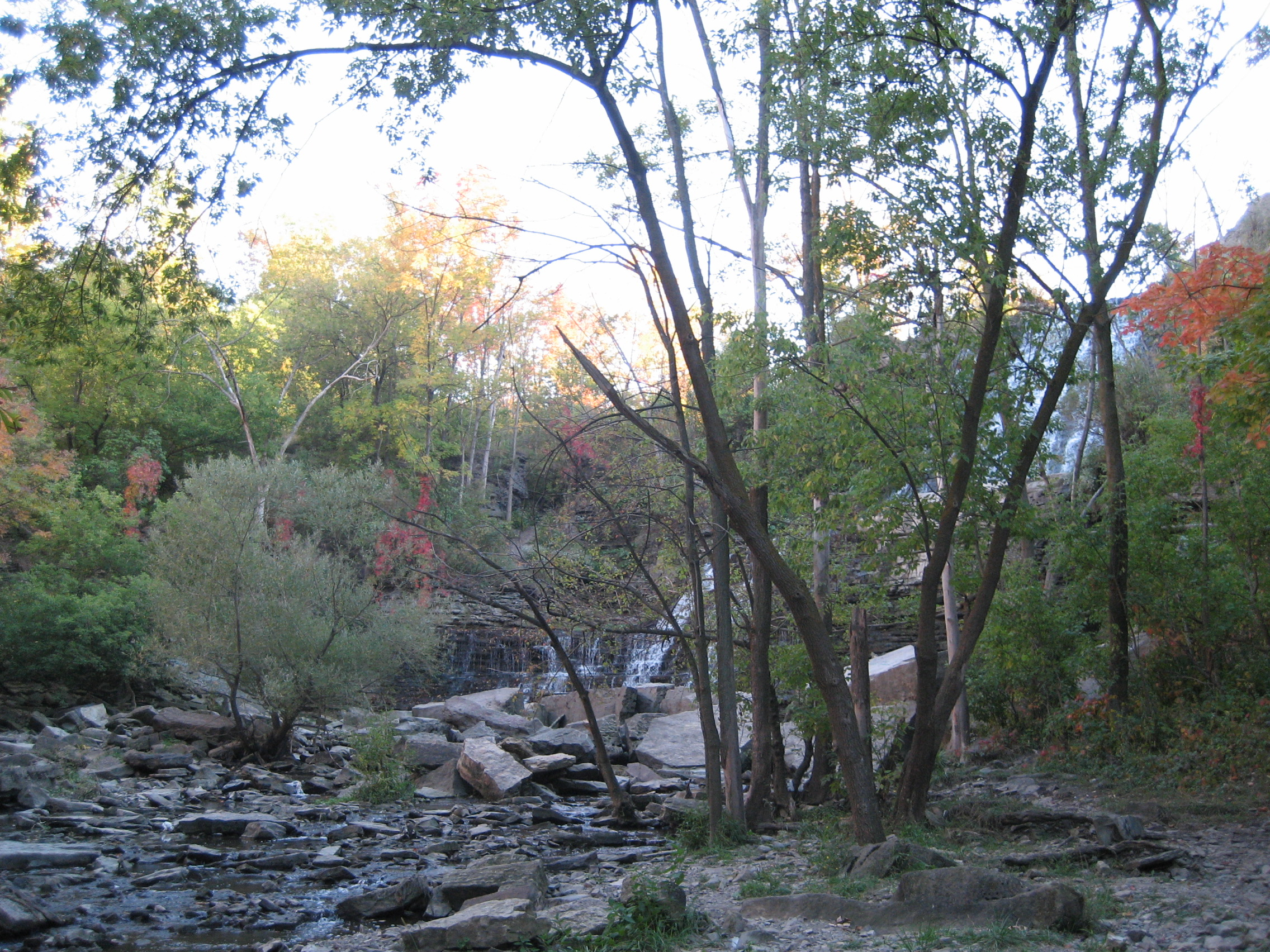
Albion Falls, King's Forest Park

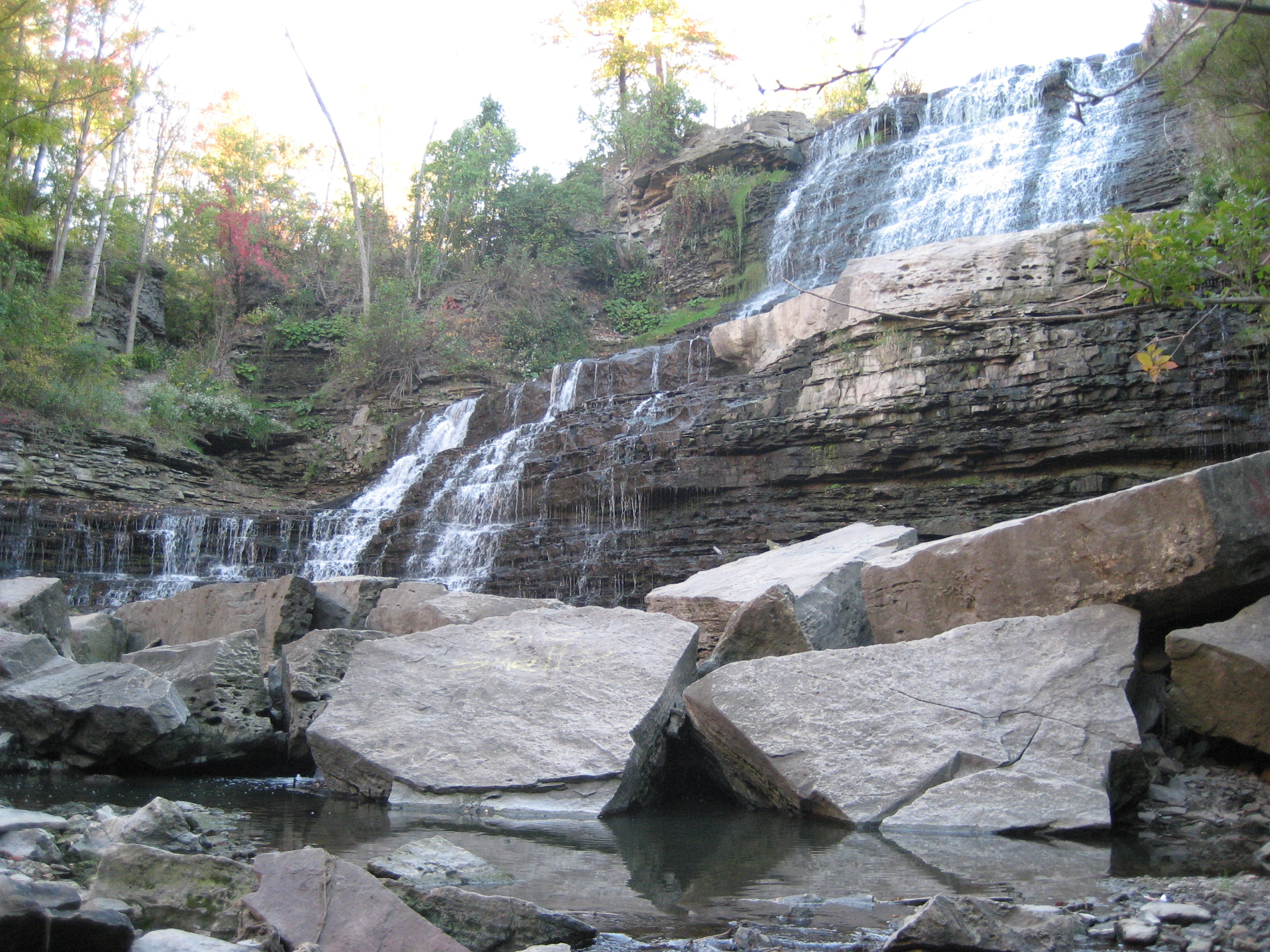
Albion Falls, King's Forest Park

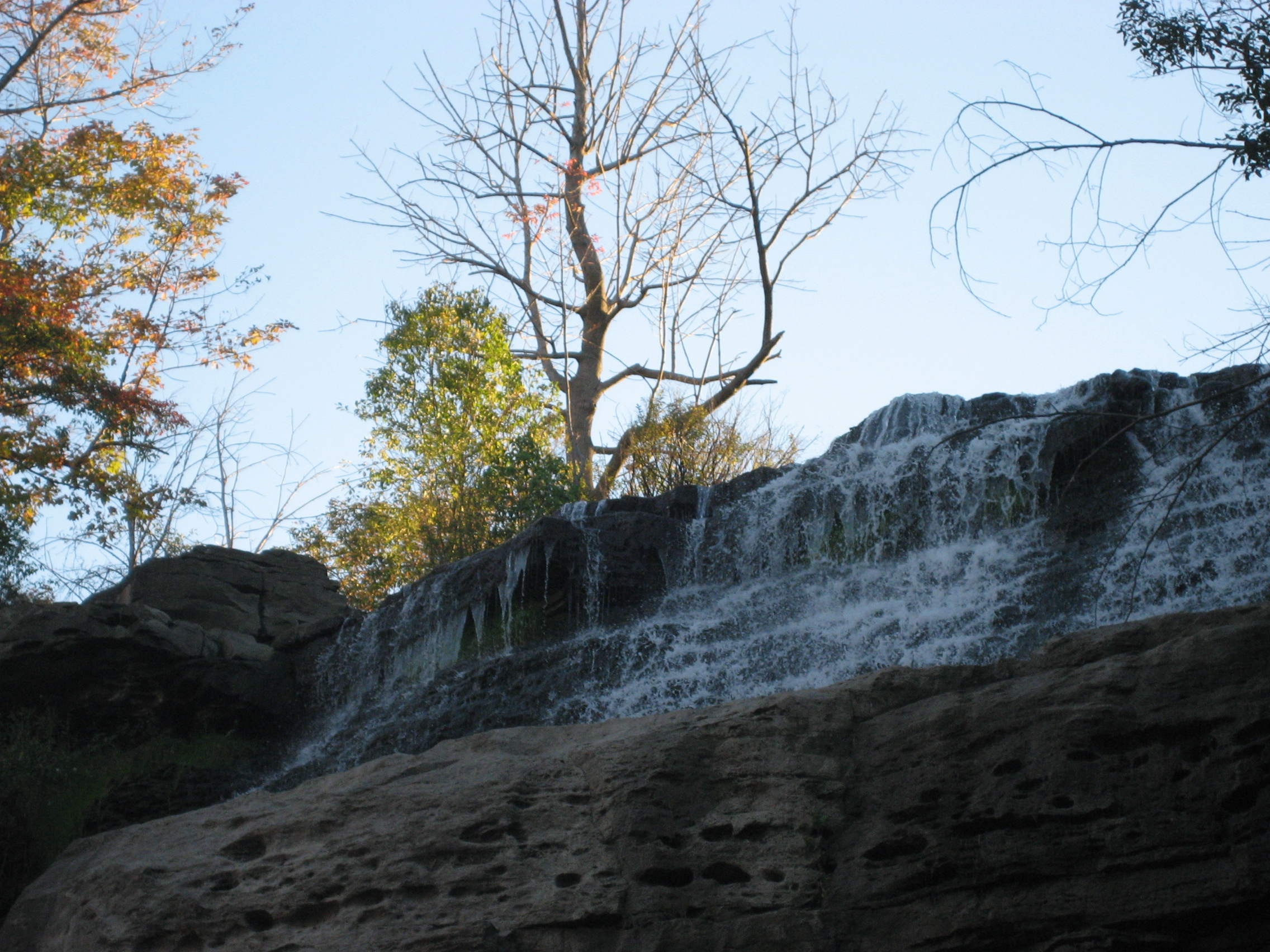
Albion Falls, King's Forest Park

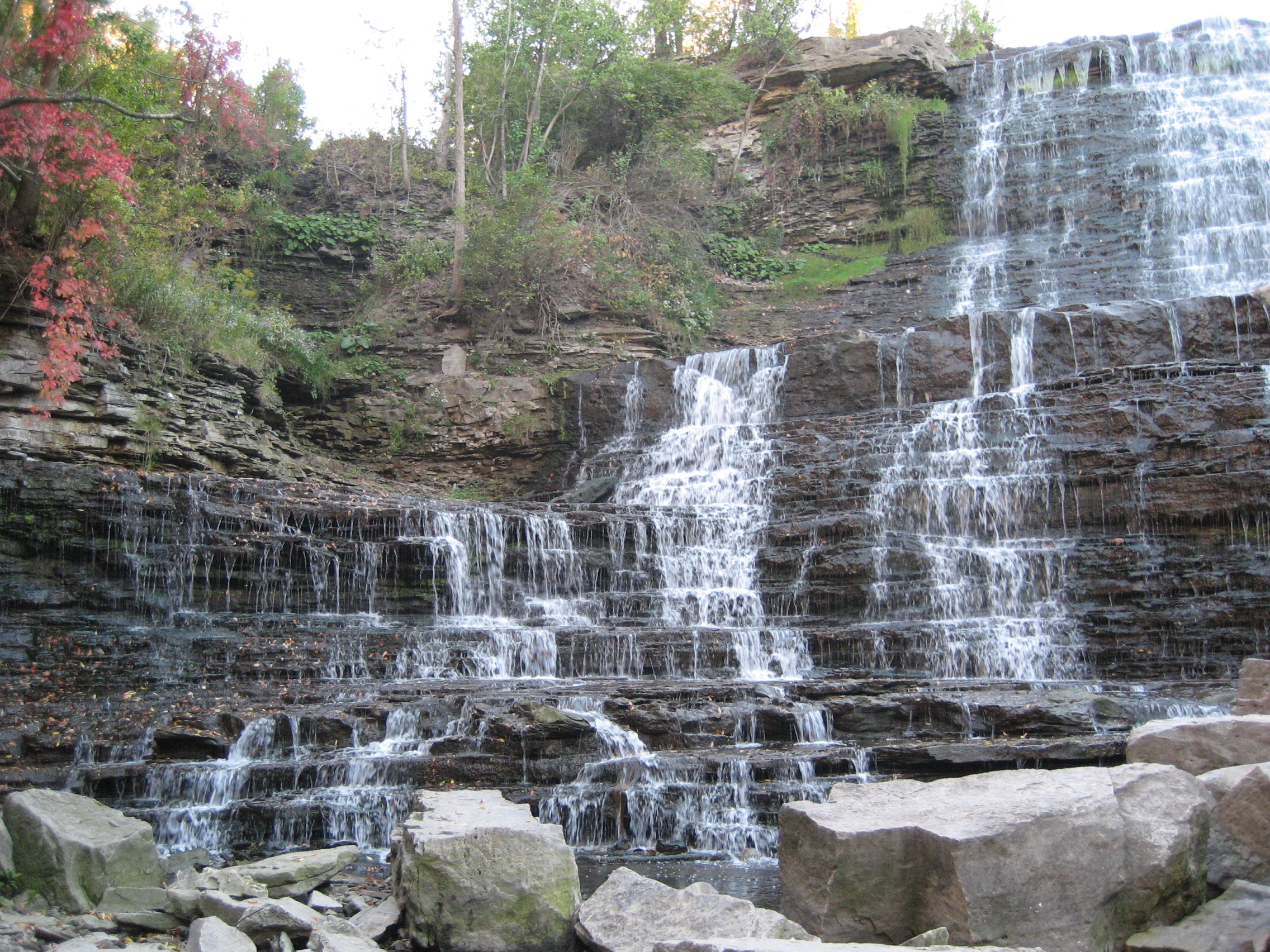
Albion Falls, King's Forest Park

== See also ==
- Glendale Falls
- Bruce Trail
- Niagara Escarpment Commission
