= Oxford Sandy and Black =

British breed of pig

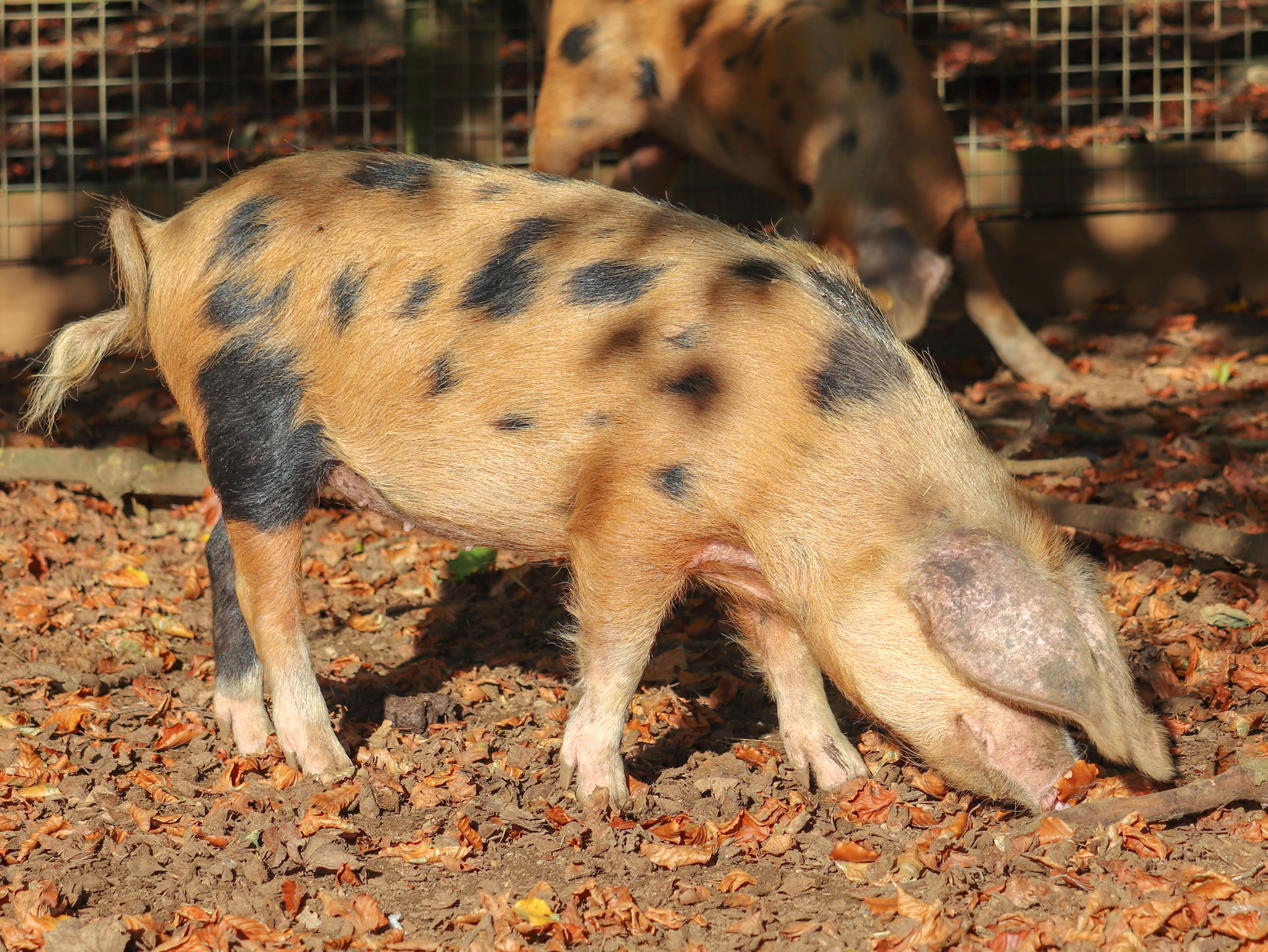
- Conservation status: extinct, recreated; FAO (2007): endangered; DAD-IS (2024)): at risk/endangered
- Other names: Axford; Old Oxford; Oxford Forest Pig; Plum Pudding Pig; Sandy Oxford
- Country of origin: United Kingdom
- Standard: British Pig Association

Traits
- Hair: sandy brown with patches of black

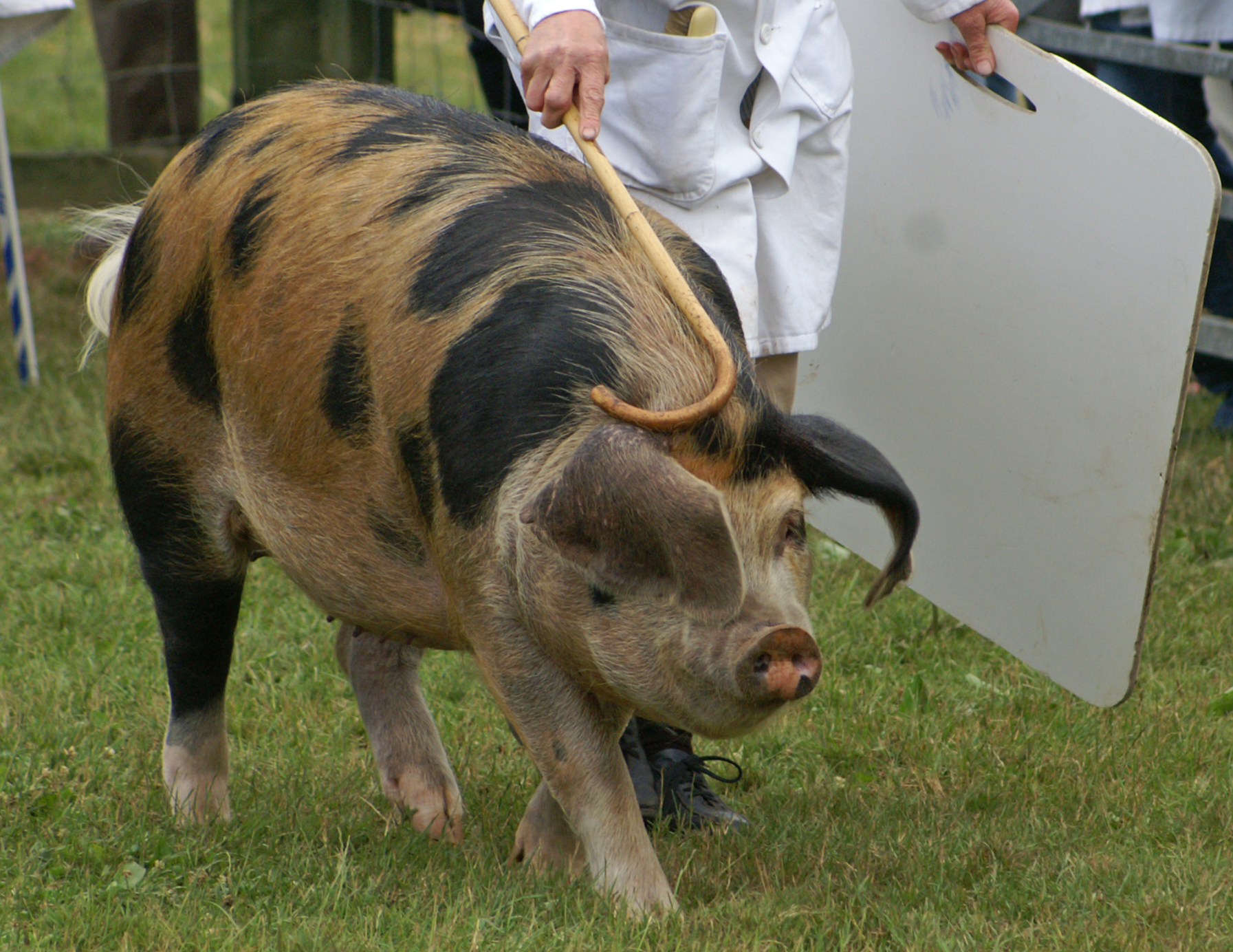
Sow at the Last Royal Show in 2009

The Oxford Sandy and Black (Note: Also written 'Oxford Sandy-and-Black' or 'Oxford Sandy & Black') is a British breed of domestic pig. It originated in the county of Oxfordshire, and is named for that and its colour, which is a sandy brown with black patches. It is believed to be one of the oldest British breeds of pig.

It has been known by many names, among them the Axford, the Old Oxford, the Oxford Forest Pig, the Plum Pudding Pig and the Sandy Oxford. Like the Blue Albion breed of cattle, it became extinct in the 1960s or 1970s, and was subsequently re-created.

== History ==
The Oxford Sandy and Black is a traditional English pig. It is believed to have originated or developed in the upper Thames Valley and in the county of Oxfordshire in the early nineteenth century, and thus to be among the older British breeds.

For much of the twentieth century numbers were very low; in some years in the 1940s no more than one new boar was registered. The publication in 1955 of the Howitt Report – which discouraged rearing of all but the three pig breeds most suitable for intensive pig farming – further reduced interest in keeping slower-growing traditional breeds such as the Sandy and Black, which by the 1960s or early 1970s was extinct as a pure-bred traditional breed. A small number of breeders attempted to reconstitute it from the few surviving animals, but when the Rare Breeds Survival Trust was formed in 1973, it declined recognition of the breed on the grounds that the pigs it saw were "masquerading" as the real thing. In 1985 a breed association, the Oxford Sandy and Black Pig Society, was set up and a herd-book was published for the first time; it listed 62 sows and 15 boars, held by 29 different breeders. The breed was recognised in 2003 by the British Pig Association, which then took over herd-book registration.

In 2021 there were either 473 or 520 sows, in the hands of some 250 keepers. The conservation status of the breed was listed as 'endangered' by the Food and Agriculture Organization of the United Nations in 2007, and as 'at risk/endangered' by DAD-IS in 2024. On the 2024–2025 watchlist of the Rare Breeds Survival Trust it was listed as 'at risk', the second level of endangerment assigned by the trust.

== Characteristics ==
The Oxford Sandy and Black is of medium to large size, long and deep in the body. The face is slightly dished, the ears lop or semi-lop. The coat is sandy, ranging from pale sand to deep rust, with patches or blotches of black; the skin is white. Sows are prolific and maternal. The pigs forage well and are not susceptible to sunburn, so are suitable for outdoor keeping.

== Use ==
Porkers are ready for slaughter at about twenty-two weeks of age.
