= Albone (surname) =

Albone is an Italian surname. Notable people with this surname include:

- Charlie Albone, an Australian landscape designer and television presenter
- Dan Albone, an English inventor, manufacturer and cyclist

== See also ==
- Albon (surname)
- Albone (disambiguation)
