= Mount Albion =

Mount Albion may refer to:

- Mount Albion (Antarctica), a mountain peak of the Athos Range
- Mount Albion, Ontario, a village in Canada
- Mount Albion, Prince Edward Island, a hamlet in Canada
- Mount Albion Cemetery, a cemetery in the U.S. state of New York

== See also ==
- Mount Albion complex
