= Albion (given name) =

Albion is a given name, usually masculine, from the poetical name for Britain, Albion. Notable people with the name include:

- Albion (Saxon), 8th century Germanic leader of the Saxons in the time of Charlemagne
- Albion Ademi (born 1999), Finnish-Albanian footballer
- Albion Earnest Andrews, Commander of the Ceylon Defence Force (1927–1928)
- Albion Avdijaj (born 1994), Albanian footballer
- Albion Fellows Bacon (1865–1933), female American reformer and writer
- Albion Rajkumar Banerjee (1871–1950), Indian civil servant and administrator, Prime Minister of Kashmir from 1927 to 1929
- Albion P. Howe (1818–1897), American Civil War Union Army general
- Albion W. Knight, Jr. (1924–2012), second archbishop of the United Episcopal Church of North America
- Albion Parris (1788–1857), American politician and jurist
- Albion Woodbury Small (1854–1926), American sociologist, influential in the establishment of sociology as a valid field of academic study
- Albion W. Tourgée (1838–1905), American pioneer civil rights activist, soldier, lawyer, writer, politician and diplomat

== See also ==
- Albion (disambiguation)
