= Albion High School =

Albion High School may refer to:

- Albion High School (Nebraska), Albion, Nebraska
- Charles D'Amico High School, also known as Albion High School, Albion, New York
- Albion High School (Michigan), Albion, Michigan
- The Albion Academy, formerly Albion High School, Pendleton, Salford, Greater Manchester, England
