= Mount Albion, Ontario =

Village in Ontario, Canada

Coordinates: 43.21678°N 79.79456°W

Mount Albion was a village located in the County of Wentworth. It was situated near Albion Falls at the north end of the Red Hill Creek Valley, in what is now east Hamilton, Ontario. Mount Albion was an important community in its area throughout the 19th century, as it featured a grist mill, blacksmith shops, taverns, a church and a general store.

== Early history ==
Mount Albion owed its existence to William Alexander Davis (1741-1834), a United Empire Loyalist, and his family. Davis was married to Hannah E. Phillips (b.ca. 1743- d.1794) Residing at a large plantation estate in North Carolina, USA during the American Revolutionary War (1775-1791), Davis was loyal to the UK and gave shelter to British soldiers. Following the British defeat, and after enduring prolonged abuse, Davis and his family were forced to leave their home. In 1792 the decision was made to re-locate to the British colony of Upper Canada where their friend John Graves Simcoe had recently become Lieutenant-Governor. Following stops in Rochester, New York and Newark (Niagara-on-the-Lake), Upper Canada, the family eventually settled on 2,000 acres (8.1 km^{2}) of land in Saltfleet Township near the brow of the Niagara Escarpment. It is here that Davis built "Harmony Hall", an elaborate house built to resemble the Davis' plantation home in North Carolina.

In order to draw in settlers to this area, Davis constructed a church called the "Auld Scotch Kirk". Soon after the Davis' arrival in the area, a saw mill was constructed, although it is not known exactly who built the mill. The earliest known owner of the mill is John Secord, who purchased it around 1812. Gradually, a small settlement began to form. It was originally named Albion Mills, Albion being the poetic name for Britain.

== Village growth and local prominence ==
The grist mill built alongside nearby Albion Falls, as well as Albion Mills' location at the head of the Red Hill Valley and along a well-travelled road were catalysts for growth in the small village. The influx of settlers to the area introduced services and establishments, including blacksmith shops, taverns and a general store. Albion Mills later gained its own stop on the horseback mail delivery route. Throughout the remainder of the 19th century, Albion Mills served as a local hub of commerce and services for the rural surrounding countryside. In 1880, the name of the village was changed to Mount Albion and the main road, up until then a muddy trail, was reconstructed with stone.
