= Albion Hotel =

Albion Hotel may refer to multiple buildings:

- Albion Hotel, Balmain, New South Wales, Australia
- Albion Hotel, Braidwood, New South Wales, Australia
- Albion Hotel, Cottesloe, Western Australia, Australia

== See also ==
- Royal Albion Hotel, Brighton, England
- Hotel Albion, Portland, Oregon, United States
