= Albion railway station =

Albion railway station may refer to:

- Albion railway station, Brisbane, Australia
- Albion railway station, Melbourne, Australia
- Albion railway station (England), a closed station in England
- Albion station (Michigan), Albion, Michigan
