= Albion (novel series) =

Albion is a trilogy of historical novels set in Arthurian Britain by British author Patrick McCormack.

== Books in the series ==
- The Last Companion (1997)
- The White Phantom (2000)
- The Lame Dancer (unpublished, but available)

== Overview ==
The story takes place around 520, thirty years after the battle of Badon, and ten years after Camlann. It is told in third person, from the point of view of numerous different characters. Through flashbacks and narrations by some of them, details of the past are revealed, concentrated in the periods before and after Arthur’s great victories over the Saxons. The plot centres on the 'Chalice of Sovereignty', a cup which Arthur obtains in mysterious circumstances and which leads to his acclamation as Amherawdyr (Emperor) of Britain. Now, ten years after his death, certain kinglets are trying to obtain the Chalice, while former members of Arthur's court struggle to stop them. As the series progresses towards its climax, these characters are drawn together, and are joined by younger companions, both Britons and Saxons. For a moment the spirit of Arthur's Britain is revived, but at the same time it is clear that the future belongs with the Saxons. The novels are steeped in the early Welsh history, myths and legends, uninfluenced by the later Arthurian Romances. While there are strong elements of fantasy, such as scrying and the echo of legends in present events, the setting is mostly realistic, even gritty.
