= Albion (Winnsboro, South Carolina) =

Historic house in South Carolina, United States

- Albion Plantation
- U.S. National Register of Historic Places
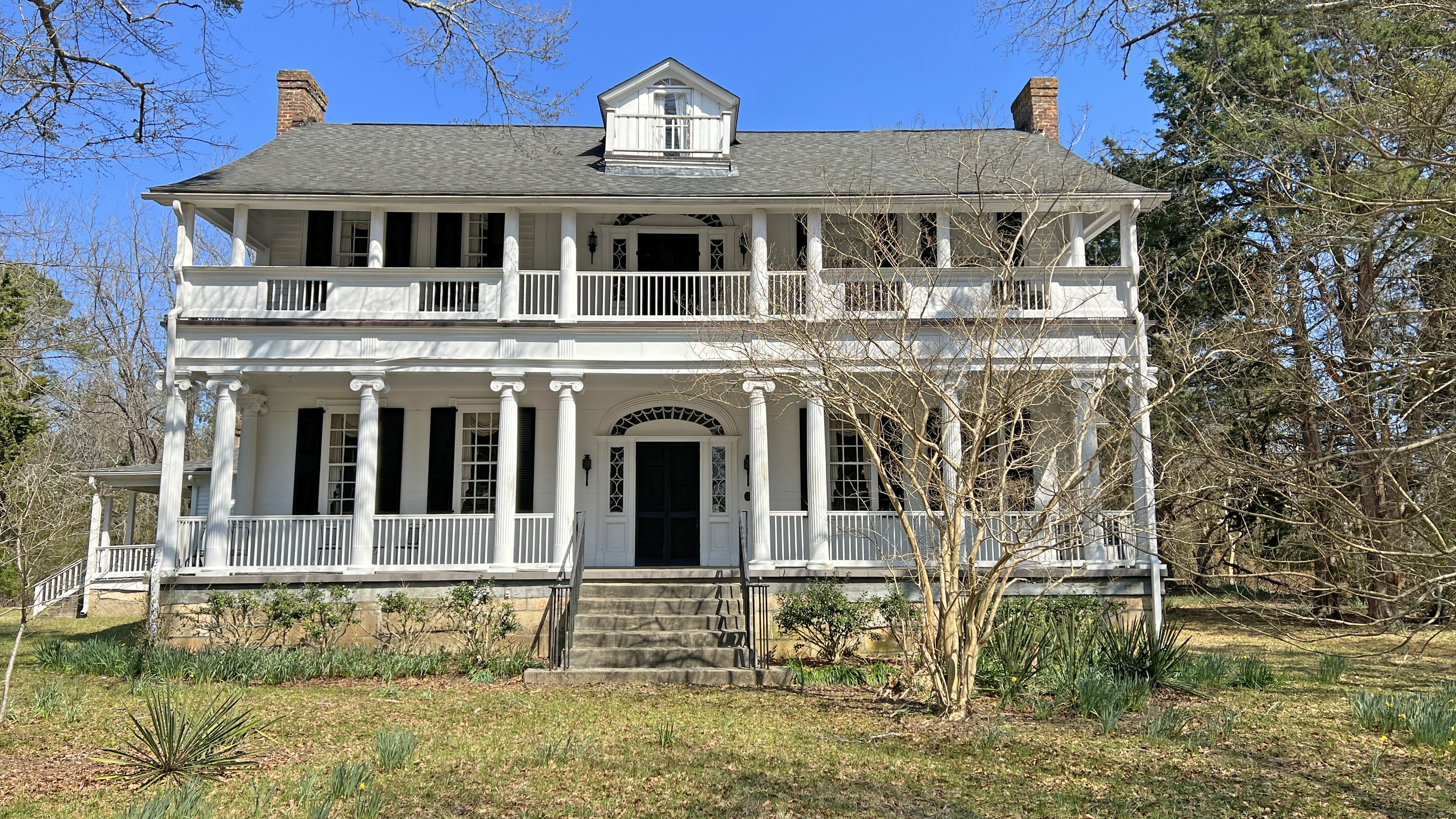

- Location within South Carolina Location within the United States
- Location: West of Winnsboro off South Carolina Highway 34, near Blackstock, South Carolina
- Coordinates: 34°27′22″N 81°14′36″W
- Area: 129.81 acres (52.53 ha)
- Built: c. 1840
- MPS: Fairfield County MRA
- NRHP reference No.: 84000592
- Added to NRHP: December 6, 1984

Albion is a historic plantation house located near Blackstock, Fairfield County, South Carolina. It was built about 1840 by a wealthy planter named Alexander Douglas.

It was added to the National Register of Historic Places in 1984.

== Information ==
Albion is significant as an unusually intact, although altered, example of a nineteenth-century Fairfield County plantation house with classical design elements which display an awareness of high-style design. Alexander Douglas, who is reported to have built Albion ca. 1840, was a wealthy planter whose estate was valued in 1860 at $76,750.

Albion is a two-story, L-shaped, weatherboarded frame residence with a side gabled roof and rear additions. The façade has a two-tiered veranda with Ionic columns, plain balustrade, and a simple entablature with triglyphs above the first story veranda. The second story veranda columns are cropped, indicating possible later alterations. Columns with both plain and fluted shafts are paired at the ends of the veranda and in the center. The windows are shuttered and have fluted surrounds with corner blocks. Both central entrances have a traceried elliptical fanlight and sidelights. An unusual parapeted dormer pierces the front center roof, perhaps another alteration. Pedimented end gables are ornamented with block modillions and lunettes which flank the chimneys. Listed in the National Register December 6, 1984.
