= Albion, Washington =

Albion
- Town
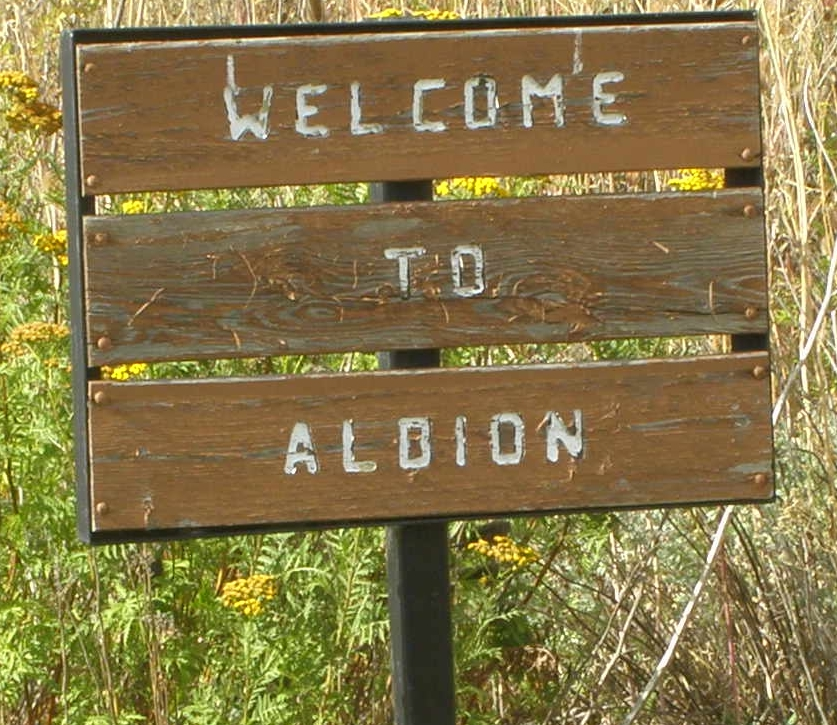
- Welcome sign

- Location of Albion, Washington

- Location within Washington (state) Location within the United States Location within North America
- Coordinates: 46°47′30″N 117°14′57″W
- Country: United States
- State: Washington
- County: Whitman

Government
  - Type: Mayor–council
  - Mayor: Carolyn Emerson

Area
  - Total: 0.39 sq mi (1.02 km^{2})
  - Land: 0.39 sq mi (1.02 km^{2})
  - Water: 0 sq mi (0.00 km^{2})
- Elevation: 2,247 ft (685 m)

Population (2020)
  - Total: 550
  - Density: 1,539.4/sq mi (594.35/km^{2})
- Time zone: UTC-8 (Pacific (PST))
  - Summer (DST): UTC-7 (PDT)
- ZIP code: 99102
- Area code: 509
- FIPS code: 53-01010
- GNIS feature ID: 2412345
- Website: www.palouse.org/albion/

Albion is a town in Whitman County, Washington, United States. The population was 550 at the 2020 Census.

== History ==
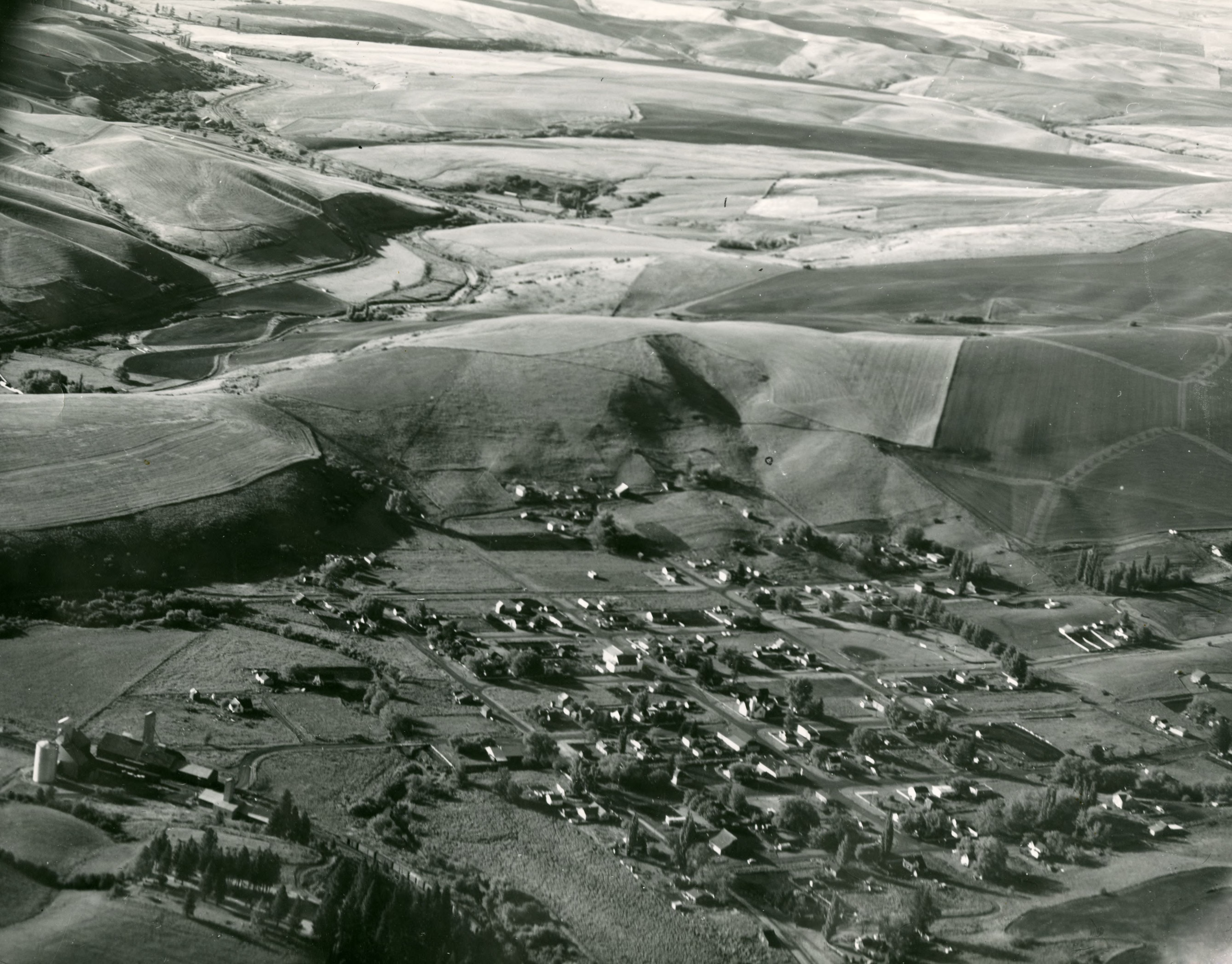
Aerial view of Albion, Washington, circa 1950

Albion was first settled in 1871 by Levi Reynolds, and was platted in 1883. The town was known as Guy, until 1901, when a resident insisted to change the town's name to honor Sir Francis Drake, who named the region Nova Albion (New England). Albion was officially incorporated on March 4, 1910.

== Geography ==
According to the United States Census Bureau, the town has a total area of 0.36 square miles (0.93 km^{2}), all of it land.

=== Climate ===
This region experiences warm (but not hot) and dry summers, with no average monthly temperatures above 71.6 °F. According to the Köppen Climate Classification system, Albion has a warm-summer Mediterranean climate, abbreviated "Csb" on climate maps.

== Demographics ==
Historical population
Census	Pop.	Note	%±
1910	276		—
1920	252		−8.7%
1930	236		−6.3%
1940	206		−12.7%
1950	256		24.3%
1960	291		13.7%
1970	687		136.1%
1980	631		−8.2%
1990	632		0.2%
2000	616		−2.5%
2010	579		−6.0%
2020	550		−5.0%
U.S. Decennial Census

=== 2010 census ===
As of the 2010 census, there were 579 people, 271 households, and 154 families living in the town. The population density was 1,608.3 inhabitants per square mile (621.0/km^{2}). There were 302 housing units at an average density of 838.9 per square mile (323.9/km^{2}). The racial makeup of the town was 92.4% White, 0.7% African American, 0.5% Native American, 1.0% Asian, 0.5% from other races, and 4.8% from two or more races. Hispanic or Latino of any race were 3.1% of the population.

There were 271 households, of which 29.5% had children under the age of 18 living with them, 40.6% were married couples living together, 10.7% had a female householder with no husband present, 5.5% had a male householder with no wife present, and 43.2% were non-families. 34.7% of all households were made up of individuals, and 7% had someone living alone who was 65 years of age or older. The average household size was 2.14 and the average family size was 2.73.

The median age in the town was 37.2 years. 23.7% of residents were under the age of 18; 7.1% were between the ages of 18 and 24; 29% were from 25 to 44; 30.7% were from 45 to 64; and 9.5% were 65 years of age or older. The gender makeup of the town was 49.4% male and 50.6% female.

=== 2000 census ===
As of the 2000 census, there were 616 people, 274 households, and 166 families living in the town. The population density was 1,663.4 people per square mile (642.8/km^{2}). There were 315 housing units at an average density of 850.6 per square mile (328.7/km^{2}). The racial makeup of the town was 93.51% White, 0.16% African American, 0.49% Native American, 0.65% Asian, 1.46% Pacific Islander, 1.79% from other races, and 1.95% from two or more races. Hispanic or Latino of any race were 3.25% of the population.

There were 274 households, out of which 26.3% had children under the age of 18 living with them, 51.5% were married couples living together, 6.9% had a female householder with no husband present, and 39.4% were non-families. 28.8% of all households were made up of individuals, and 4.7% had someone living alone who was 65 years of age or older. The average household size was 2.25 and the average family size was 2.81.

In the town, the age distribution of the population shows 21.8% under the age of 18, 12.3% from 18 to 24, 33.9% from 25 to 44, 22.7% from 45 to 64, and 9.3% who were 65 years of age or older. The median age was 34 years. For every 100 females, there were 94.3 males. For every 100 females age 18 and over, there were 88.3 males.

The median income for a household in the town was $40,179, and the median income for a family was $45,893. Males had a median income of $28,250 versus $23,828 for females. The per capita income for the town was $19,567. About 11.7% of families and 15.8% of the population were below the poverty line, including 32.8% of those under age 18 and none of those age 65 or over.
