= The Albion Academy =

Location
- 1 London Street; Pendleton; Salford, Greater Manchester, M6 6QT; England
- Coordinates: 53.49496°N 2.27741°W

Information
- Type: Academy
- Local authority: Salford City Council
- Trust: United Learning
- Department for Education URN: 146793 Tables
- Ofsted: Reports
- Principal: Mathew Rogers
- Gender: Co-educational
- Age: 11 to 16
- Website: http://www.albionacademy.org/

The Albion Academy (formerly the Albion High School) is a coeducational secondary school located in Pendleton, Salford, Greater Manchester.

The school was formed from the merger of The Lowry High School in Lower Broughton, and Kersal High in Kersal. The former was created from the merger of Broughton High School and Irwell Valley High School (which sat on the site of the current school)

Previously a community school administered by Salford City Council, the Albion High School converted to academy status on 1 September 2012 and was renamed the Albion Academy.

The Albion Academy offers GCSEs and BTECs as programmes of study for pupils. The school also offers its sports, performing arts and IT facilities for use to the local community.
