= Red Hill Valley =

Valley in Ontario, Canada

Coordinates: 43.2234°N 79.7981°W

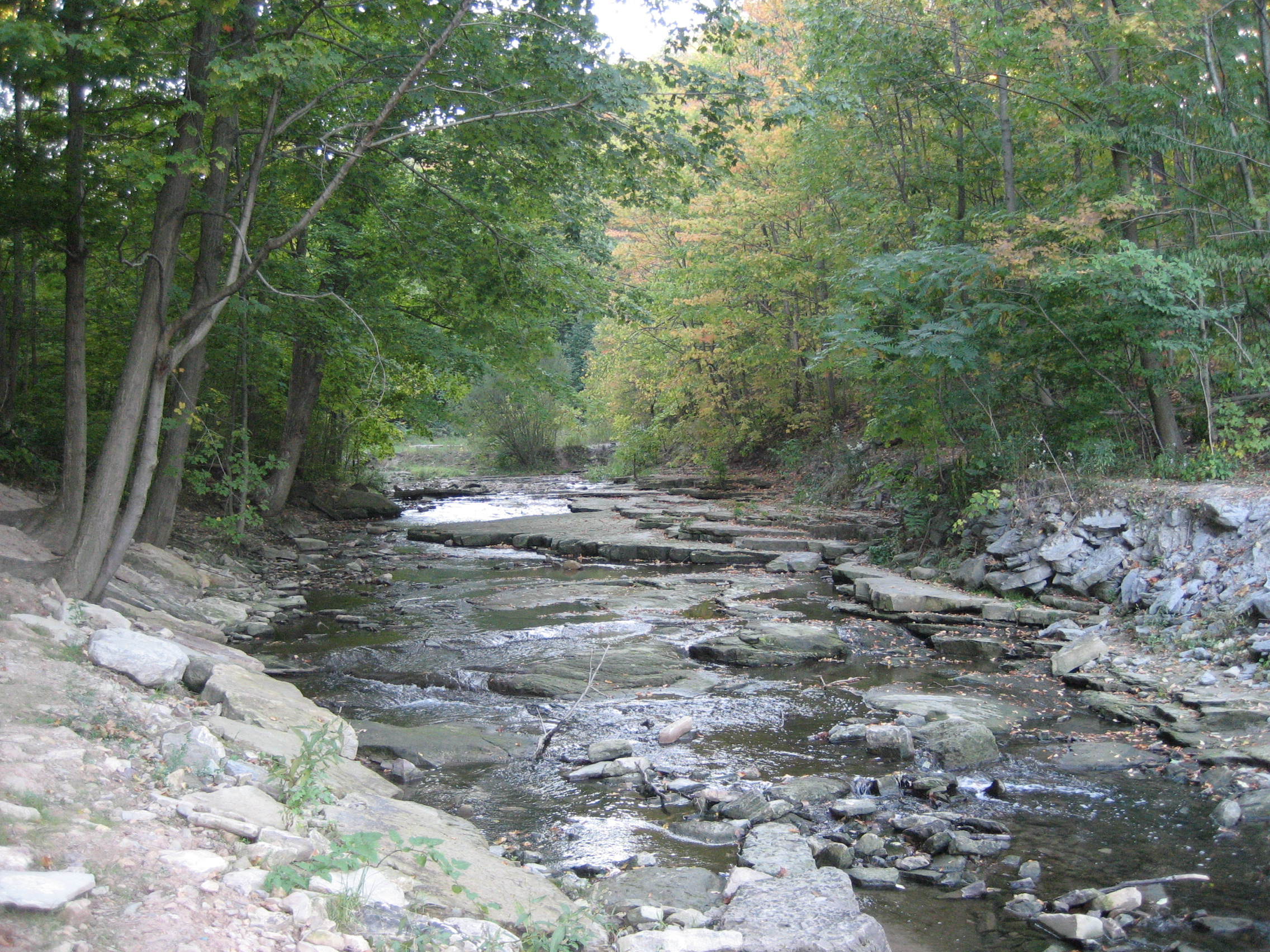
Red Hill Creek in King's Forest Park, Hamilton, Ontario

Red Hill Valley is a valley in eastern and south-eastern Hamilton, Ontario, Canada. The valley is named after and home to the Red Hill Creek, which flows 7 kilometres (4.3 mi) north-east from Albion Falls on the Niagara Escarpment, before bending north-west near the Queen Elizabeth Way and discharging into Hamilton Harbour at Windermere Basin. The name of the area comes from the reddish soil, rich with iron. The valley is estimated to be 1,600 acres (650 ha) in size. The Red Hill Valley was the site of a protracted battle over an expressway through the valley, ultimately constructed in 2007.

== Expressway ==
The Valley is the site of the Red Hill Valley Parkway, which was completed through the valley in 2007. Originally called the Red Hill Creek Expressway during planning, construction was fought by environmentalists for many years. The expressway was proposed as part of a plan to bypass Hamilton along its south side, and facilitate development to the south and east of Hamilton. The valley, located between Hamilton's core and Stoney Creek, was chosen for the route of the expressway in the 1970s. The route was chosen over urban routes to avoid destruction of the neighbourhoods on either side and the resulting land costs.

After government cancellations and environmental assessments, compromise plans proposed in the 1990s to save the valley were ultimately rejected. The final design incorporated some compromises intended to ameliorate the effect of the expressway on the valley, including reducing the expressway width from six lanes down to four, cleanup of toxic lands along the creek, and creek habitat improvement. The City of Hamilton proceeded with construction in the first decade of the 2000s. Construction was halted several times by protesters occupying the valley and blocking access to construction sites. The City had to complete the project with security firms patrolling the valley.

== King's Forest ==
King's Forest is the name of the park lands at the head of the Valley where it meets the Niagara Escarpment. Within the King's Forest park, Red Hill Creek tributaries make three waterfalls over the Escarpment, the most notable being Albion Falls. Buttermilk Falls is near to Albion Falls and is the least known of the three waterfalls. The other waterfall is called Felker's Falls.
