= Albion Falls =

Waterfall in Hamilton, Ontario

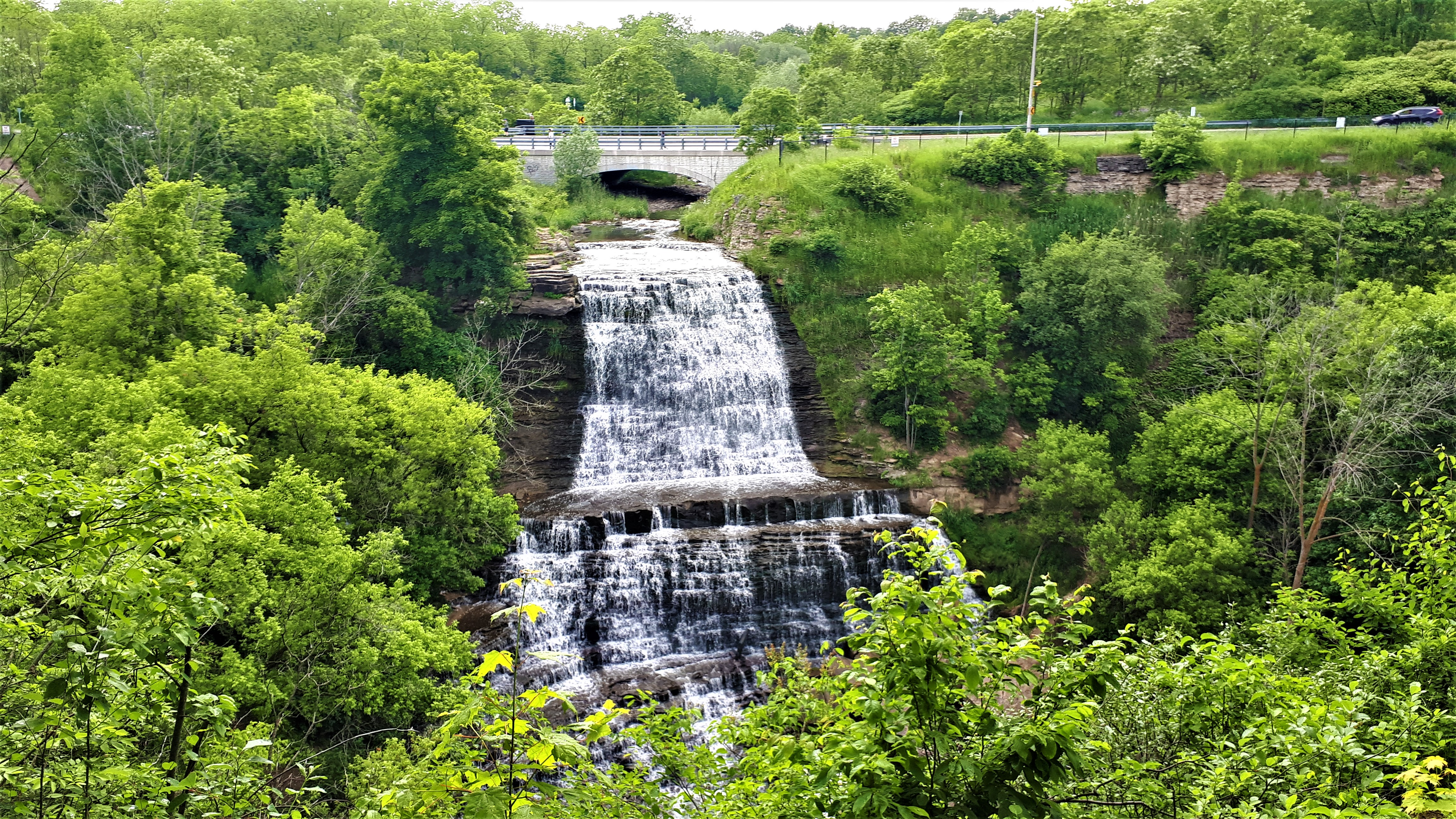
- Albion Falls in June 2019

- Location within Ontario
- Location: Hamilton, Ontario
- Coordinates: 43°12′02″N 79°49′11″W
- Type: Cascade
- Total height: 19 m (62 ft)
- Total width: 18 m (59 ft)
- Watercourse: Red Hill Creek

Albion Falls is a 19 m (62 ft) classical/cascade waterfall flowing down the Niagara Escarpment in Red Hill Valley, in Hamilton, Ontario, Canada. With cascade falls the downpour is staggered into a series of steps causing water to "cascade". The top of the falls are located on Mountain Brow Blvd. The lower-end of the falls can be found at the south-end of King's Forest Park in lower Hamilton by following the Red Hill Creek south towards the Niagara Escarpment.

Albion Falls was once seriously considered as a possible source of water for Hamilton. Rocks from the Albion Falls area were used in the construction of the Royal Botanical Gardens' Rock Garden.

The ravine at the Albion Falls has a legend of the Lover's Leap. The story is that early in the 19th century young Jane Riley, disappointed in love with Joseph Rousseau, stood at the top of a steep cliff not far from thundering Albion Falls and flung herself to the bottom 100 ft (30 m) below. The steep drop has since been dubbed "Lovers' Leap" and many tales have grown up about the suicide.

Nearby attractions include the Bruce Trail, Buttermilk Falls, Devil's Punch Bowl, Felker's Falls, Confederation Park (via Red Hill Trail), LIUNA 4 Ice Centre at Mohawk Sports Park, scenic views of lower Hamilton, King's Forest Golf Course and Park, Gage Park and Hamilton Children's Museum.

== Directions ==
To reach Albion Falls via a walking trail, take the Escarpment Rail Trail or the Albion Side Trail of the Bruce Trail.

To reach Albion Falls by car, exit on Dartnell Road from the Lincoln M. Alexander Parkway. Go south on Dartnell, then go left onto Stone Church Road East. Turn left onto Pritchard Road, then left again onto Mud Street. You will find two parking lots available on either side of Mud Street where it connects with Mountain Brow Boulevard.

You can also reach it by taking Mohawk Road till it ends at the Escarpment, then take the road around the brow and it will be on the left side. You can also take Limeridge Road East till it dead ends at the brow, then turn left and then a quick right into the parking lot.

Note: Due to the completion of the Red Hill Valley Parkway, you can no longer reach Albion Falls via Mud Street.

== Images ==
Albion Falls
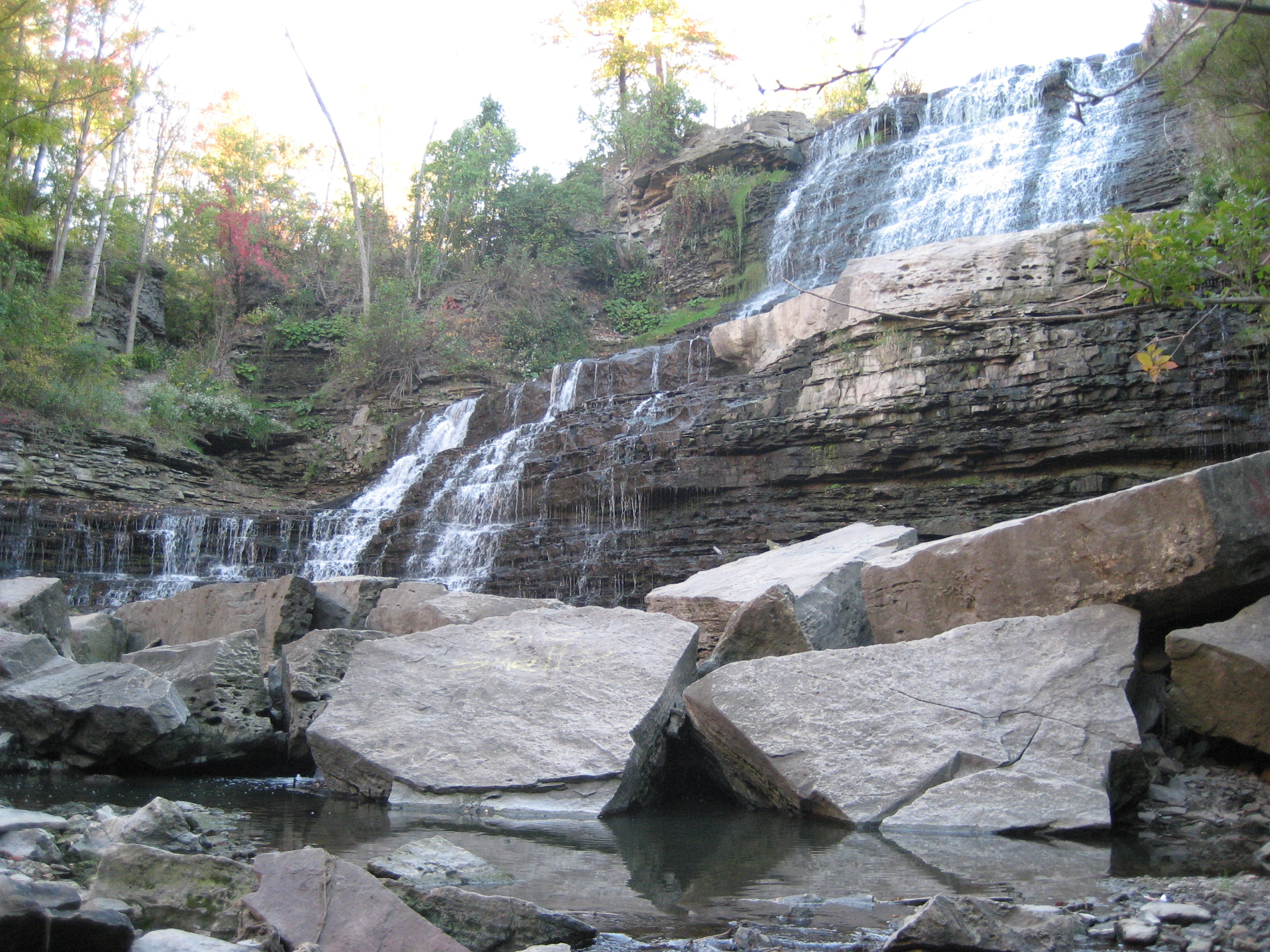
Albion Falls, King's Forest Park

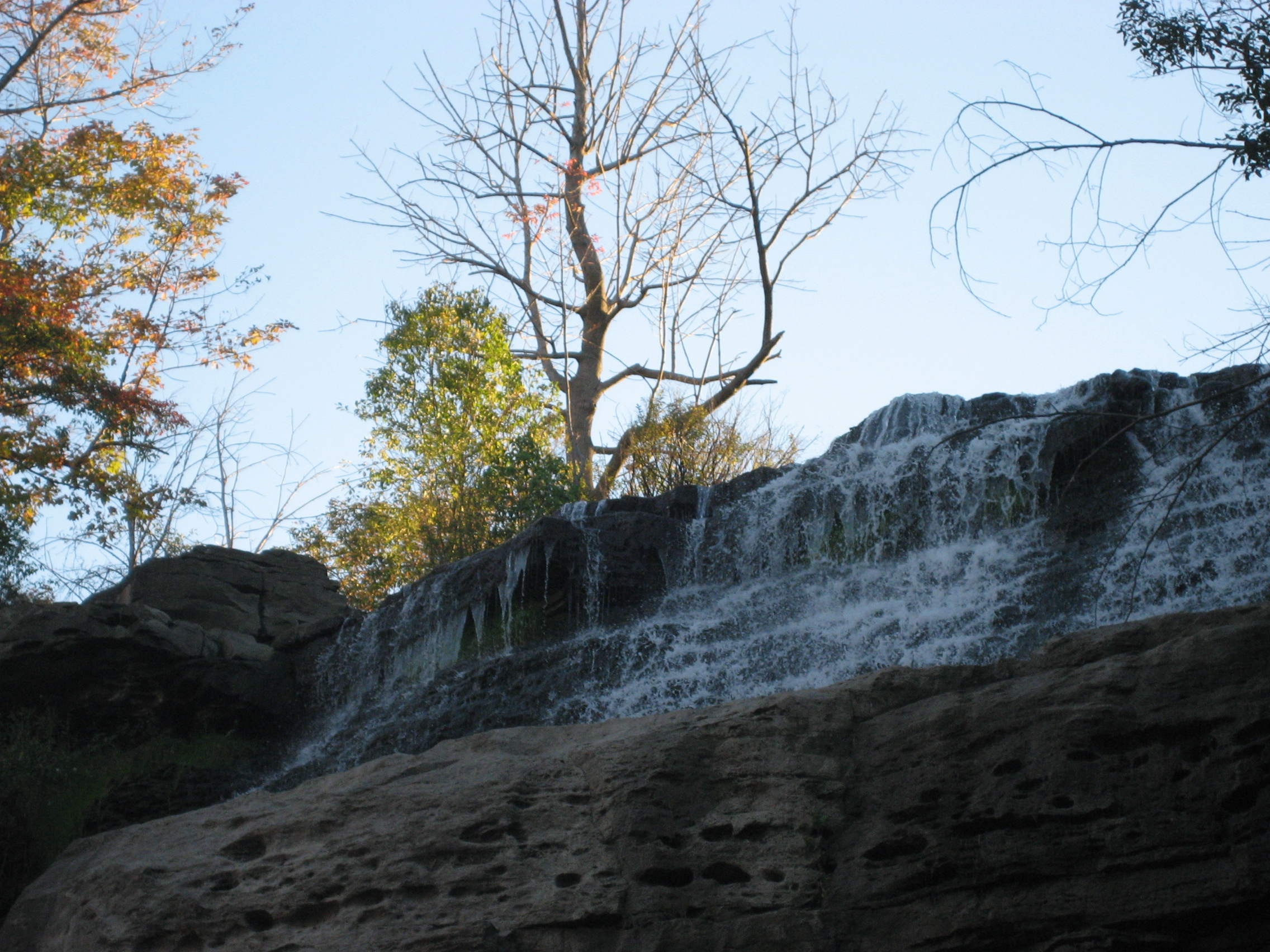
Albion Falls, King's Forest Park

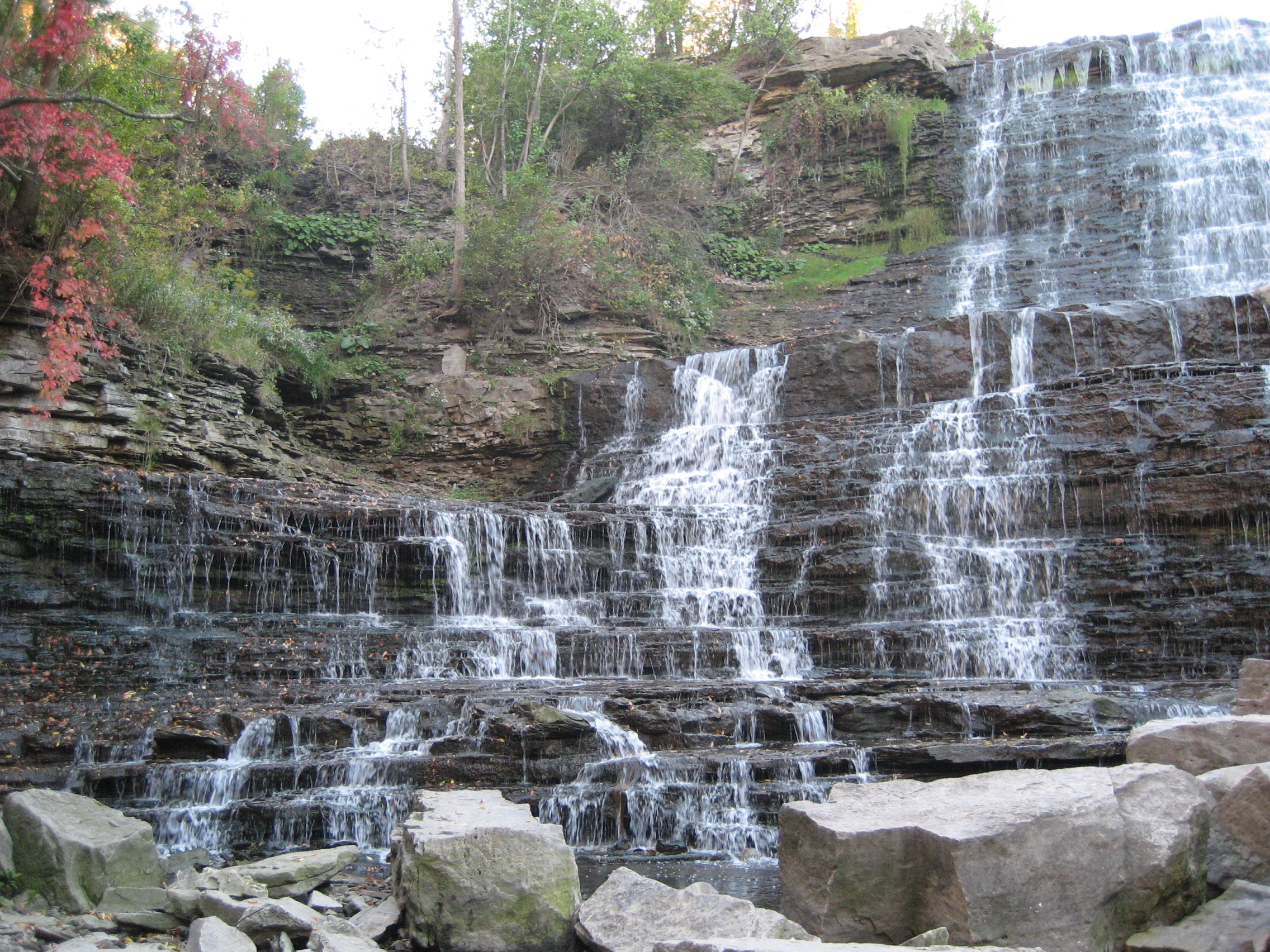
Albion Falls, King's Forest Park

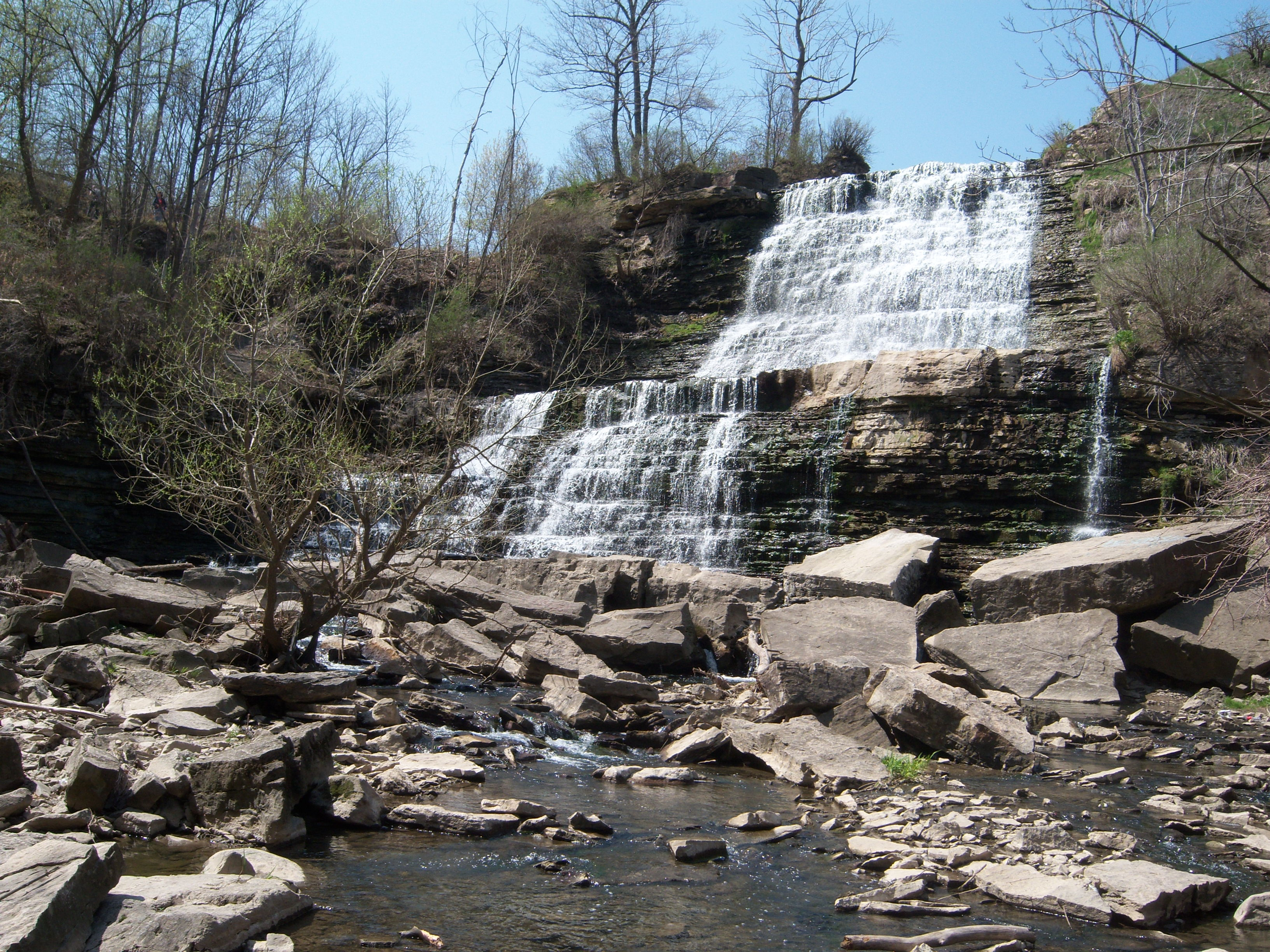
Albion Falls in April 2008

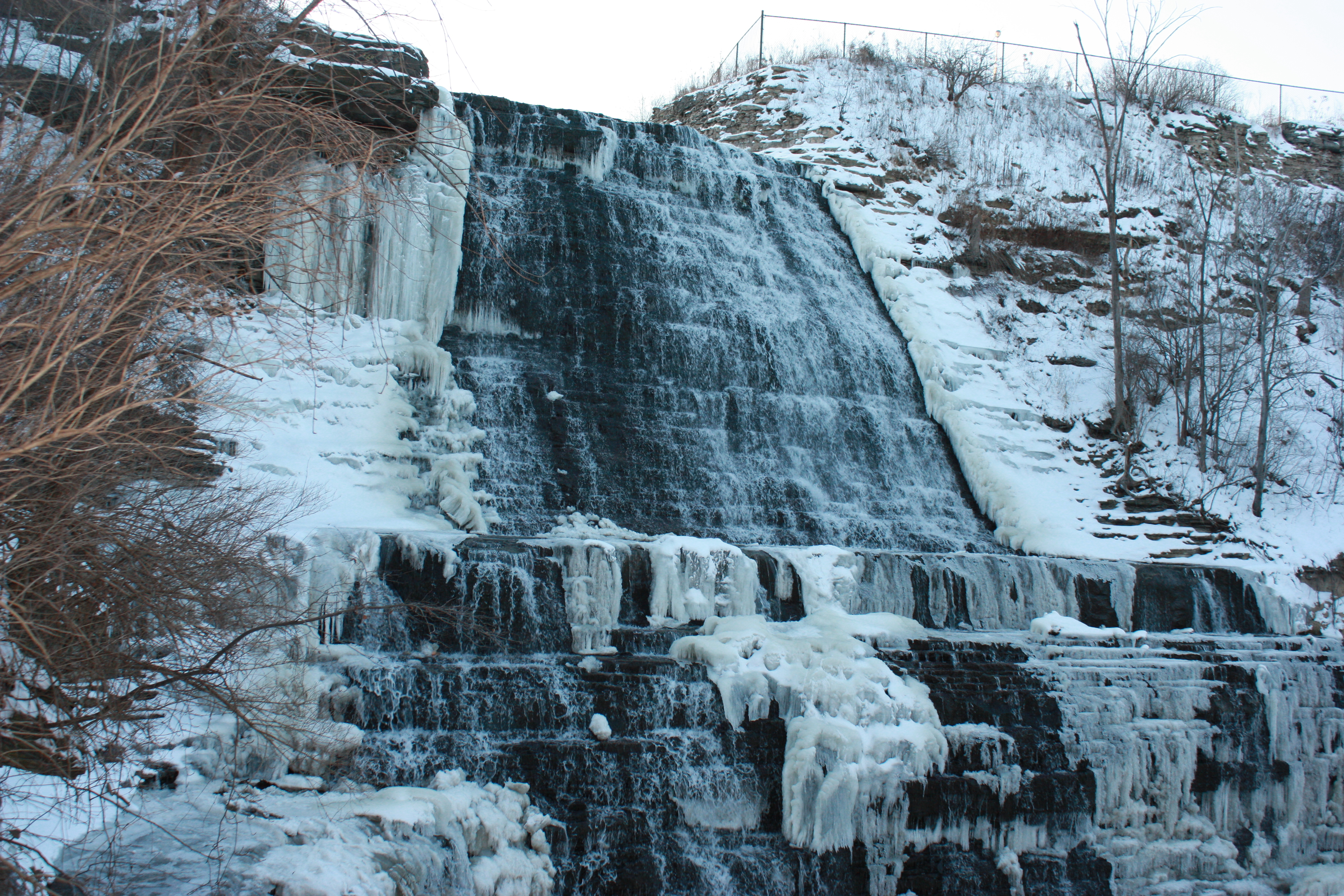
Albion Falls in Winter

== See also ==
- List of waterfalls
- List of waterfalls of Canada
- List of waterfalls in Hamilton, Ontario
