= Blue Albion =

British breed of cattle

- Conservation status: extinct circa 1968; re-created from 1989; FAO (2007): critical-maintained; RBST (2019): critical
- Other names: Blue English; Derbyshire Blue; Bakewell Blue; Albion
- Country of origin: United Kingdom
- Distribution: English Midlands
- Use: dual-purpose, meat and milk

Traits
- Coat: blue roan
- Cattle; Bos (primigenius) taurus

The Blue Albion was a British breed of cattle with an unusual blue roan coat. It originated in the English Midlands in the late nineteenth or early twentieth century, and was a dual-purpose breed, reared both for beef and for milk. It became extinct following the foot-and-mouth outbreak of 1967.

The breed was later re-created from a mixed population of cross-bred cattle, which was recognised in 2018 by the Rare Breeds Survival Trust with the name Albion. It is a critically endangered breed.

== History ==
The Blue Albion originated in the county of Derbyshire in the late nineteenth or early twentieth century; it derived from cross-breeding of Southern Wales Black and white Dairy Shorthorn stock. A herd-book was started in 1916, in which only blue roan animals could be recorded. In 1920 a breed society, the Blue Albion Cattle Society, was formed: the first edition of the herd-book was published in 1937.

The Blue Albion was never more than a small and localised population. The last annual general meeting of the breed society was held in 1940 and the Society was dissolved in 1966. During the foot-and-mouth outbreak of 1967 in the Midlands, large numbers of cattle were slaughtered in an attempt to limit the spread of the disease. This included nearly all the remaining Blue Albion stock, and from about 1968 the breed was considered extinct. The last bull was registered in 1972.

A small population of blue roan cattle was later assembled from a variety of cross-bred animals, many of them resulting from cross-breeding of Shorthorn and Friesian stock and most of them unregistered. A new breed society was formed in 1989, but the stock was not recognised as a breed until 2018, when it was recognised by the Rare Breeds Survival Trust with the name Albion. A survey in 2002 by Rare Breeds International of 95 of these cattle had found the genetic relationship between members of the group to be much lower than that of the former Blue Albion stock. In the twenty-first century this re-created breed is critically endangered.

== Characteristics ==
The characteristic blue roan colour of the Blue Albion resulted from a mixture of black and white hairs; some calves were solid black or white, and these were ineligible for registration.

== Use ==
It was a dual-purpose breed, used both for meat and for dairy production.
