= Albon (surname) =

Albon is a surname. Notable people with the surname include:

- Alan Albon (1921–1989), British anarchist and publisher
- Alex Albon (born 1996), Thai racing driver
- Lee Albon (born 1959), Australian cricketer
- Mark Albon (born 1969), British racing driver
- Nigel Albon (born 1957), British racing driver, father of Alex
- Teodora Albon (born 1977), Romanian football referee
