= Albone =

Albone may refer to:

- Albone Glacier, glacier
- Albone (surname), an Italian surname
