= Hotel Albion =

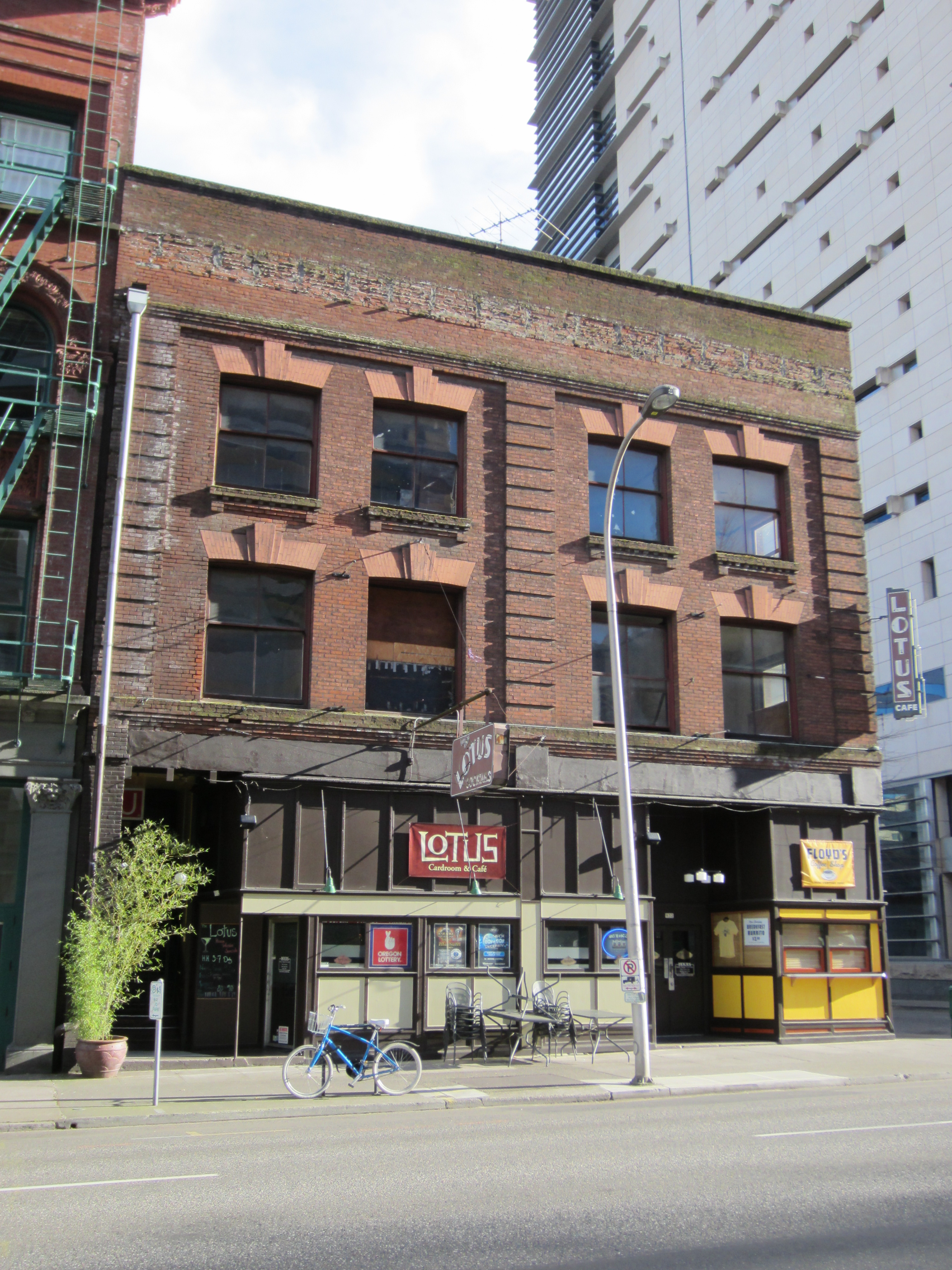
- Lotus Cardroom & Cafe, 2012

- Location within Portland, Oregon
- Alternative names: Lotus Hotel

General information
- Location: 930 S.W. 3rd Avenue, Portland, Oregon, United States
- Coordinates: 45.51634°N 122.67632°W
- Completed: 1906
- Demolished: 2018

Hotel Albion, established in 1906, was a hotel and historic building in Portland, Oregon, in the United States. It was best known for housing the Lotus Café, which occupied the ground floor from 1924 until its closure in August 2016. The hotel was renamed the Lotus Hotel in the 1930s or 1940s, but it closed in 1976 as a result of fire safety violations.

Designs for a 10-story office building that proposed to be constructed on the site were approved by the Portland Design Commission, a city-appointed advisory panel, in early July 2016. The plans called for demolition of the Hotel Albion, and Ankrom Moisan Architects submitted a demolition permit to the city in mid-July 2016. The Auditorium and Music Hall, located directly adjacent to the former hotel, was not proposed for demolition.

Demolition began on June 28, 2018, and was largely completed by mid-July.

== See also ==
- Ancient Order of United Workmen Temple – nearby building also demolished as part of same overall redevelopment plan
