= 2010–11 WOAA Senior League season =

- League: WOAA Senior AA Hockey League
- Sport: Hockey
- Duration: Regular season September 2010 – January 2011; Playoffs; February 2011 – April 2011
- Teams: 19
- Finals champions: Sr. AA - Saugeen Shores Winterhawks; Sr. A - Walkerton Capitals

WOAA Senior League seasons
- 2009–10 2011–12

The 2010–11 WOAA Senior League season was the 21st season of the WOAA Senior AA Hockey League. The league played a 26-game regular season which began in September 2010 and concluded in January 2011. The post-season began in February 2011 and concluded in April 2011.

The Saugeen Shores Winterhawks won the WOAA Senior AA Hockey Championship, defeating the Monkton Wildcats in the final round of the playoffs.

== Regular season ==
=== Elora Rocks illegal player ===
The Elora Rocks were stripped of four wins after the Rocks were found guilty of using an illegal player in four games. Rookie defenceman Brendon Haefling, a Waterloo, Ontario resident and Conestoga College student, should have been signed to an import card. Instead, he was signed to a local card that listed his residence as Fergus, Ontario.

Head coach Kevin Lobsinger, as well as managers Steve Maginnis and Merv Skerritt, were suspended five games. The Rocks were fined $100.

All the stats from the forfeited games stand, but the opponents - Durham, Walkerton and Shallow Lake - get the points in the standings for victories.

=== Final standings ===
Note: GP = Games played; W = Wins; L= Losses; OTL = Overtime losses; GF = Goals for; GA = Goals against; Pts = Points; Green shade = Clinched playoff spot

Rank	North Division	GP	W	L	OTL	Pts	GF	GA
1	Saugeen Shores Winterhawks	26	22	4	0	44	132	78
2	Elora Rocks	26	20	6	0	40	170	87
3	Shelburne Muskies	26	18	8	0	36	135	93
4	Lucknow Lancers	26	13	10	3	29	110	120
5	Palmerston 81's	26	13	12	1	27	112	106
6	Ripley Wolves	26	10	10	6	26	111	125
7	Durham Thundercats	26	11	12	3	25	107	132
8	Shallow Lake Crushers	26	10	14	2	22	110	137
9	Walkerton Capitals	26	8	17	1	17	94	127
10	Drayton Icemen	26	5	20	1	11	101	177

Rank	South Division	GP	W	L	OTL	Pts	GF	GA
1	Tavistock Royals	26	20	3	3	43	161	85
2	Monkton Wildcats	26	20	3	3	43	125	62
3	Petrolia Squires	26	20	6	0	40	132	93
4	Tillsonburg Thunder	26	16	9	1	33	134	114
5	Lucan-Ilderton Jets	26	12	14	0	24	118	132
6	Milverton Four Wheel Drives	26	9	14	3	21	116	127
7	Thedford Dirty Dogs	26	7	17	2	16	86	135
8	Goderich Pirates	26	7	19	0	14	108	168
9	Clinton Radars	26	6	18	2	14	90	154

== Playoffs ==
=== WOAA Senior "AA" Hockey playoffs ===
Divisional quarter-finals
N1	Saugeen Shores	4
N8	Shallow Lake	0
N4	Lucknow	4
N5	Palmerston	2
N2	Elora	4
N7	Durham	0
N3	Shelburne	4
N6	Ripley	0
S1	Tavistock	4
S8	Goderich	0
S4	Tillsonburg	4
S5	Lucan-Ilderton	0
S2	Monkton	4
S7	Thedford	1
S3	Petrolia	4
S6	Milverton	2

Divisional semi-finals
N1	Saugeen Shores	4
N4	Lucknow	0
N2	Elora	4
N3	Shelburne	1
S1	Tavistock	1
S4	Tillsonburg	4
S2	Monkton	4
S3	Petrolia	2

Divisional finals
N1	Saugeen Shores	4
N2	Elora	1
S4	Tillsonburg	2
S2	Monkton	4

WOAA Sr. AA finals
N1	Saugeen Shores	4
S2	Monkton	1

==== WOAA Senior AA divisional quarter-finals ====
===== (N1) Saugeen Shores Winterhawks vs. (N8) Shallow Lake Crushers =====
February 4	Saugeen Shores Winterhawks	5 – 1	Shallow Lake Crushers	Shallow Lake

February 5	Shallow Lake Crushers	2 – 9	Saugeen Shores Winterhawks	Saugeen Shores

February 11	Saugeen Shores Winterhawks	6 – 5	OT	Shallow Lake Crushers	Shallow Lake

February 12	Shallow Lake Crushers	2 – 10	Saugeen Shores Winterhawks	Saugeen Shores

Saugeen Shores wins series 4 – 0

===== (N2) Elora Rocks vs. (N7) Durham Thundercats =====
February 4	Durham Thundercats	2 – 6	Elora Rocks	Elora

February 9	Elora Rocks	10 – 7	Durham Thundercats	Durham

February 11	Durham Thundercats	2 – 6	Elora Rocks	Elora

February 12	Elora Rocks	6 – 5	OT	Durham Thundercats	Durham

Elora wins series 4 – 0

===== (N3) Shelburne Muskies vs. (N6) Ripley Wolves =====
February 5	Ripley Wolves	4 – 8	Shelburne Muskies	Shelburne

February 6	Shelburne Muskies	8 – 1	Ripley Wolves	Ripley

February 12	Ripley Wolves	4 – 5	2OT	Shelburne Muskies	Shelburne

February 13	Shelburne Muskies	6 – 3	Ripley Wolves	Ripley

Shelburne wins series 4 – 0

===== (N4) Lucknow Lancers vs. (N5) Palmerston 81's =====
Note: Games two and four were played at Harriston Arena in Harriston, Ontario.

February 4	Palmerston 81's	3 – 6	Lucknow Lancers	Lucknow

February 5	Lucknow Lancers	3 – 4	Palmerston 81's	Palmerston

February 11	Palmerston 81's	6 – 4	Lucknow Lancers	Lucknow

February 12	Lucknow Lancers	5 – 3	Palmerston 81's	Palmerston

February 18	Palmerston 81's	3 – 4	OT	Lucknow Lancers	Lucknow

February 19	Lucknow Lancers	5 – 3	Palmerston 81's	Palmerston

Lucknow wins series 4 – 2

===== (S1) Tavistock Royals vs. (S8) Goderich Pirates =====
February 4	Tavistock Royals	7 – 3	Goderich Pirates	Goderich

February 6	Goderich Pirates	4 – 14	Tavistock Royals	Tavistock

February 11	Tavistock Royals	5 – 2	Goderich Pirates	Goderich

February 12	Goderich Pirates	2 – 7	Tavistock Royals	Tavistock

Tavistock wins series 4 – 0

===== (S2) Monkton Wildcats vs. (S7) Thedford Dirty Dogs =====
Note: Thedford's home games were played at South Huron Recreation Centre in Exeter, Ontario.

February 4	Thedford Dirty Dogs	3 – 2	Monkton Wildcats	Monkton

February 5	Monkton Wildcats	3 – 0	Thedford Dirty Dogs	Exeter

February 11	Thedford Dirty Dogs	2 – 8	Monkton Wildcats	Monkton

February 13	Monkton Wildcats	7 – 2	Thedford Dirty Dogs	Exeter

February 19	Thedford Dirty Dogs	0 – 6	Monkton Wildcats	Monkton

Monkton wins series 4 – 1

===== (S3) Petrolia Squires vs. (S6) Milverton Four Wheel Drives =====
February 4	Milverton Four Wheel Drives	1 – 6	Petrolia Squires	Petrolia

February 5	Petrolia Squires	4 – 6	Milverton Four Wheel Drives	Milverton

February 11	Milverton Four Wheel Drives	3 – 5	Petrolia Squires	Petrolia

February 12	Petrolia Squires	5 – 4	Milverton Four Wheel Drives	Milverton

February 13	Milverton Four Wheel Drives	5 – 4	3OT	Petrolia Squires	Petrolia

February 18	Milverton Four Wheel Drives	3 – 7	Petrolia Squires	Petrolia

Petrolia wins series 4 – 2

===== (S4) Tillsonburg Thunder vs. (S5) Lucan-Ilderton Jets =====
February 5	Lucan-Ilderton Jets	5 – 6	OT	Tillsonburg Thunder	Tillsonburg

February 8	Tillsonburg Thunder	9 – 3	Lucan-Ilderton Jets	Lucan

February 11	Lucan-Ilderton Jets	0 – 5	Tillsonburg Thunder	Tillsonburg

February 12	Tillsonburg Thunder	7 – 4	Lucan-Ilderton Jets	Lucan

Tillsonburg wins series 4 – 0

==== WOAA Senior AA divisional semi-finals ====
===== (N1) Saugeen Shores Winterhawks vs. (N4) Lucknow Lancers =====
February 25	Lucknow Lancers	2 – 4	Saugeen Shores Winterhawks	Saugeen Shores

February 26	Saugeen Shores Winterhawks	6 – 3	Lucknow Lancers	Lucknow

March 4	Lucknow Lancers	1 – 4	Saugeen Shores Winterhawks	Saugeen Shores

March 5	Saugeen Shores Winterhawks	6 – 0	Lucknow Lancers	Lucknow

Saugeen Shores wins series 4 – 0

===== (N2) Elora Rocks vs. (N3) Shelburne Muskies =====
February 25	Shelburne Muskies	3 – 4	Elora Rocks	Elora

February 26	Elora Rocks	3 – 4	Shelburne Muskies	Shelburne

March 4	Shelburne Muskies	4 – 5	Elora Rocks	Elora

March 6	Elora Rocks	7 – 6	Shelburne Muskies	Shelburne

March 11	Shelburne Muskies	6 – 9	Elora Rocks	Elora

Elora wins series 4 – 1

===== (S1) Tavistock Royals vs. (S4) Tillsonburg Thunder =====
February 25	Tavistock Royals	5 – 6	OT	Tillsonburg Thunder	Tillsonburg

February 26	Tillsonburg Thunder	5 – 2	Tavistock Royals	Tavistock

March 4	Tavistock Royals	6 – 7	Tillsonburg Thunder	Tillsonburg

March 5	Tillsonburg Thunder	1 – 6	Tavistock Royals	Tavistock

March 6	Tillsonburg Thunder	7 – 4	Tavistock Royals	Tavistock

Tillsonburg wins series 4 – 1

===== (S2) Monkton Wildcats vs. (S3) Petrolia Squires =====
February 25	Petrolia Squires	1 – 2	Monkton Wildcats	Monkton

February 27	Monkton Wildcats	0 – 3	Petrolia Squires	Petrolia

March 4	Petrolia Squires	3 – 1	Monkton Wildcats	Monkton

March 6	Monkton Wildcats	3 – 2	Petrolia Squires	Petrolia

March 12	Petrolia Squires	1 – 6	Monkton Wildcats	Monkton

March 13	Monkton Wildcats	4 – 1	Petrolia Squires	Petrolia

Monkton wins series 4 – 2

==== WOAA Senior AA divisional finals ====
===== (N1) Saugeen Shores Winterhawks vs. (N2) Elora Rocks =====
March 18	Elora Rocks	5 – 4	OT	Saugeen Shores Winterhawks	Saugeen Shores

March 20	Saugeen Shores Winterhawks	4 – 2	Elora Rocks	Elora

March 25	Elora Rocks	1 – 2	Saugeen Shores Winterhawks	Saugeen Shores

March 27	Saugeen Shores Winterhawks	8 – 3	Elora Rocks	Elora

April 1	Elora Rocks	4 – 6	Saugeen Shores Winterhawks	Saugeen Shores

Saugeen Shores wins series 4 – 1

===== (S2) Monkton Wildcats vs. (S4) Tillsonburg Thunder =====
Note: Game six was awarded to Monkton due to Tillsonburg playing with an illegal player.

March 18	Tillsonburg Thunder	3 – 4	Monkton Wildcats	Monkton

March 19	Monkton Wildcats	2 – 0	Tillsonburg Thunder	Tillsonburg

March 25	Tillsonburg Thunder	7 – 5	Monkton Wildcats	Monkton

March 26	Monkton Wildcats	4 – 5	Tillsonburg Thunder	Tillsonburg

March 27	Tillsonburg Thunder	1 – 3	Monkton Wildcats	Monkton

March 21	Tillsonburg Thunder	4 – 1	Monkton Wildcats	Monkton

Monkton wins series 4 – 2

==== WOAA Sr. AA Championship ====
===== (N1) Saugeen Shores Winterhawks vs. (S2) Monkton Wildcats =====
Note: Monkton's home games were played at Listowel Memorial Arena in Listowel, Ontario.

April 8	Monkton Wildcats	3 – 5	Saugeen Shores Winterhawks	Saugeen Shores

April 9	Saugeen Shores Winterhawks	2 – 5	Monkton Wildcats	Listowel

April 15	Monkton Wildcats	2 – 5	Saugeen Shores Winterhawks	Saugeen Shores

April 16	Saugeen Shores Winterhawks	6 – 5	Monkton Wildcats	Listowel

April 19	Monkton Wildcats	2 – 4	Saugeen Shores Winterhawks	Saugeen Shores

Saugeen Shores wins series 4 – 1

=== WOAA Senior "A" Hockey playoffs ===
The bottom three teams in the league standings did not qualify for the Senior AA playoffs and played in the Senior A playoffs.

==== WOAA Senior A semi-finals ====
===== Round robin =====
The top two teams in the round robin qualify for the WOAA Sr. "A" finals.

Rank	Round robin	GP	W	L	Pts	GF	GA
1	Walkerton Capitals	4	2	2	4	18	16
2	Clinton Radars	4	2	2	4	20	22
3	Drayton Icemen	4	2	2	4	24	24

- Tie-breaking game: Drayton 5 at Clinton 6 (OT)

==== WOAA Senior A finals ====
===== (N9) Walkerton Capitals vs. (S9) Clinton Radars =====
March 12	Walkerton Capitals	0 – 5	Clinton Radars	Clinton

March 13	Clinton Radars	5 – 9	Walkerton Capitals	Walkerton

March 18	Walkerton Capitals	8 – 7	OT	Clinton Radars	Clinton

March 19	Clinton Radars	2 – 3	Walkerton Capitals	Walkerton

Walkerton wins series 3 – 1
