= 2008–09 WOAA Senior League season =

- League: WOAA Senior AA Hockey League
- Sport: Hockey
- Duration: Regular season October 2008 – January 2009; Playoffs; February 2009 – April 2009
- Teams: 21
- Finals champions: Sr. AA - Saugeen Shores Winterhawks; Sr. A - Lucan-Ilderton Jets; Sr. B - Milverton Four Wheel Drives

WOAA Senior League seasons
- 2007–08 2009–10

The 2008–09 WOAA Senior League season was the 19th season of the WOAA Senior AA Hockey League. The league played a 20-game regular season which began in October 2008 and concluded in January 2009. The post-season began in February 2009 and concluded in April 2009.

The Saugeen Shores Winterhawks won the WOAA Senior AA Hockey Championship, defeating the Petrolia Squires in the final round of the playoffs.

== Team changes ==
- The Georgian Bay River Rats relocated to Borden, Ontario from Thornbury, Ontario and were renamed the Nottawasaga River Rats.
- The Petrolia Squires join the league from Major League Hockey.
- The Tillsonburg Thunder join the league from Major League Hockey.
- The Walkerton Capitals join the league as an expansion team.
- The Wingham Bulls went on hiatus for the 2008–09 season and would eventually fold.
- The Lucknow Lancers move from the South Division to the North Division.

== Regular season ==
=== Final standings ===
Note: GP = Games played; W = Wins; L= Losses; OTL = Overtime losses; GF = Goals for; GA = Goals against; Pts = Points; Green shade = Clinched playoff spot

Rank	North Division	GP	W	L	OTL	SL	Pts	GF	GA
1	Saugeen Shores Winterhawks	20	16	3	1	0	40	135	72
2	Elora Rocks	20	16	4	0	0	32	140	64
3	Shelburne Muskies	20	15	5	0	0	27	142	72
4	Palmerston 81's	20	14	4	1	1	20	139	88
5	Durham Thundercats	20	14	6	0	0	28	119	86
6	Ripley Wolves	20	11	7	1	1	24	115	88
7	Lucknow Lancers	20	9	9	1	1	20	89	83
8	Drayton Icemen	20	7	13	0	0	14	101	138
9	Walkerton Capitals	20	4	14	1	1	10	54	125
10	Shallow Lake Crushers	20	3	16	1	0	7	62	164
11	Nottawasaga River Rats	20	1	19	0	0	2	54	170

Rank	South Division	GP	W	L	OTL	SL	Pts	GF	GA
1	Petrolia Squires	20	16	2	1	1	34	104	51
2	Lucan-Ilderton Jets	20	15	3	2	0	32	106	66
3	Tavistock Royals	20	13	4	2	1	29	127	76
4	Clinton Radars	20	13	6	0	1	27	89	67
5	Tillsonburg Thunder	20	11	7	2	0	24	100	84
6	Exeter Mohawks	20	10	9	1	0	21	89	88
7	Monkton Wildcats	20	9	9	0	2	20	92	88
8	Goderich Pirates	20	9	10	1	0	19	90	103
9	Milverton Four Wheel Drives	20	4	16	0	0	8	66	121
10	Thedford Dirty Dogs	20	0	20	0	0	0	57	176

== Playoffs ==
=== WOAA Senior "AA" Hockey playoffs ===
Sr. AA qualifying
N1	Saugeen Shores	4
N8	Drayton	0
N4	Palmerston	4
N5	Durham	0
N2	Elora	4
N7	Lucknow	1
N3	Shelburne	4
N6	Ripley	0
S1	Petrolia	4
S8	Goderich	0
S2	Lucan-Ilderton	1
S7	Monkton	4
S3	Tavistock	4
S6	Exeter	1
S4	Clinton	4
S5	Tillsonburg	3

Sr. AA quarter-finals
N1	Saugeen Shores	4
N4	Palmerston	1
N2	Elora	2
N3	Shelburne	4
S1	Petrolia	4
S7	Monkton	1
S3	Tavistock	4
S4	Clinton	3

Sr. AA semi-finals
N1	Saugeen Shores	4
N3	Shelburne	3
S1	Petrolia	3
S3	Tavistock	4

Sr. AA finals
N1	Saugeen Shores	4
S3	Tavistock	1

==== WOAA Senior AA qualifying series ====
===== (N1) Saugeen Shores Winterhawks vs. (N8) Drayton Icemen =====
February 6	Drayton Icemen	3 – 9	Saugeen Shores Winterhawks	Saugeen Shores

February 8	Saugeen Shores Winterhawks	7 – 3	Drayton Icemen	Drayton

February 13	Drayton Icemen	3 – 10	Saugeen Shores Winterhawks	Saugeen Shores

February 8	Saugeen Shores Winterhawks	7 – 3	Drayton Icemen	Drayton

Saugeen Shores wins series 4 – 0

===== (N2) Elora Rocks vs. (N7) Lucknow Lancers =====
February 6	Lucknow Lancers	1 – 6	Elora Rocks	Elora

February 7	Elora Rocks	1 – 3	Lucknow Lancers	Lucknow

February 13	Lucknow Lancers	3 – 5	Elora Rocks	Elora

February 14	Elora Rocks	7 – 1	Lucknow Lancers	Lucknow

February 18	Lucknow Lancers	3 – 5	Elora Rocks	Elora

Elora wins series 4 – 1

===== (N3) Shelburne Muskies vs. (N6) Ripley Wolves =====
February 6	Ripley Wolves	3 – 5	Shelburne Muskies	Shelburne

February 7	Shelburne Muskies	7 – 1	Ripley Wolves	Ripley

February 13	Ripley Wolves	3 – 5	Shelburne Muskies	Shelburne

February 14	Shelburne Muskies	5 – 4	Ripley Wolves	Ripley

Shelburne wins series 4 – 0

===== (N4) Palmerston 81's vs. (N5) Durham Thundercats =====
February 7	Durham Thundercats	2 – 9	Palmerston 81's	Palmerston

February 13	Palmerston 81's	6 – 2	Durham Thundercats	Durham

February 15	Durham Thundercats	4 – 5	OT	Palmerston 81's	Palmerston

February 20	Palmerston 81's	5 – 4	OT	Durham Thundercats	Durham

Palmerston wins series 4 – 0

===== (S1) Petrolia Squires vs. (S8) Goderich Pirates =====
February 6	Goderich Pirates	3 – 4	Petrolia Squires	Petrolia

February 8	Petrolia Squires	4 – 3	OT	Goderich Pirates	Goderich

February 13	Goderich Pirates	5 – 7	Petrolia Squires	Petrolia

February 15	Petrolia Squires	3 – 2	Goderich Pirates	Goderich

Petrolia wins series 4 – 0

===== (S2) Lucan-Ilderton Jets vs. (S7) Monkton Wildcats =====
February 7	Monkton Wildcats	1 – 4	Lucan-Ilderton Jets	Lucan

February 13	Lucan-Ilderton Jets	1 – 3	Monkton Wildcats	Monkton

February 14	Monkton Wildcats	5 – 4	OT	Lucan-Ilderton Jets	Lucan

February 20	Lucan-Ilderton Jets	0 – 1	Monkton Wildcats	Monkton

February 21	Monkton Wildcats	5 – 2	Lucan-Ilderton Jets	Lucan

Monkton wins series 4 – 1

===== (S3) Tavistock Royals vs. (S6) Exeter Mohawks =====
February 7	Exeter Mohawks	1 – 3	Tavistock Royals	Tavistock

February 8	Tavistock Royals	2 – 3	OT	Exeter Mohawks	Exeter

February 14	Exeter Mohawks	2 – 5	Tavistock Royals	Tavistock

February 15	Tavistock Royals	7 – 0	Exeter Mohawks	Exeter

February 20	Exeter Mohawks	5 – 6	OT	Tavistock Royals	Tavistock

Tavistock wins series 4 – 1

===== (S4) Clinton Radars vs. (S5) Tillsonburg Thunder =====
February 6	Tillsonburg Thunder	2 – 8	Clinton Radars	Clinton

February 7	Clinton Radars	5 – 4	Tillsonburg Thunder	Tillsonburg

February 13	Tillsonburg Thunder	4 – 2	Clinton Radars	Clinton

February 14	Clinton Radars	6 – 1	Tillsonburg Thunder	Tillsonburg

February 20	Tillsonburg Thunder	5 – 3	Clinton Radars	Clinton

February 22	Clinton Radars	3 – 4	OT	Tillsonburg Thunder	Tillsonburg

February 24	Tillsonburg Thunder	5 – 6	OT	Clinton Radars	Clinton

Clinton wins series 4 – 3

==== WOAA Senior AA quarter-finals ====
===== (N1) Saugeen Shores Winterhawks vs. (N4) Palmerston 81's =====
February 27	Palmerston 81's	3 – 5	Saugeen Shores Winterhawks	Saugeen Shores

March 1	Saugeen Shores Winterhawks	7 – 6	Palmerston 81's	Palmerston

March 6	Palmerston 81's	4 – 6	Saugeen Shores Winterhawks	Saugeen Shores

March 8	Saugeen Shores Winterhawks	5 – 8	Palmerston 81's	Palmerston

March 13	Palmerston 81's	2 – 4	Saugeen Shores Winterhawks	Saugeen Shores

Saugeen Shores wins series 4 – 1

===== (N2) Elora Rocks vs. (N3) Shelburne Muskies =====
February 25	Shelburne Muskies	6 – 3	Elora Rocks	Elora

February 28	Elora Rocks	3 – 6	Shelburne Muskies	Shelburne

March 6	Shelburne Muskies	5 – 6	OT	Elora Rocks	Elora

March 8	Elora Rocks	5 – 7	Shelburne Muskies	Shelburne

March 13	Shelburne Muskies	4 – 7	Elora Rocks	Elora

March 14	Elora Rocks	7 – 8	OT	Shelburne Muskies	Shelburne

Shelburne wins series 4 – 2

===== (S1) Petrolia Squires vs. (S7) Monkton Wildcats =====
February 27	Monkton Wildcats	0 – 3	Petrolia Squires	Petrolia

February 28	Petrolia Squires	2 – 3	Monkton Wildcats	Monkton

March 6	Monkton Wildcats	2 – 5	Petrolia Squires	Petrolia

March 7	Petrolia Squires	3 – 1	Monkton Wildcats	Monkton

March 13	Monkton Wildcats	5 – 7	Petrolia Squires	Petrolia

Petrolia wins series 4 – 1

===== (S3) Tavistock Royals vs. (S4) Clinton Radars =====
February 28	Clinton Radars	4 – 5	Tavistock Royals	Tavistock

March 1	Tavistock Royals	6 – 5	OT	Clinton Radars	Clinton

March 6	Clinton Radars	6 – 2	Tavistock Royals	Tavistock

March 7	Tavistock Royals	3 – 4	OT	Clinton Radars	Clinton

March 14	Clinton Radars	2 – 5	Tavistock Royals	Tavistock

March 15	Tavistock Royals	4 – 5	OT	Clinton Radars	Clinton

March 17	Clinton Radars	4 – 5	OT	Tavistock Royals	Tavistock

Tavistock wins series 4 – 3

==== WOAA Senior AA semi-finals ====
===== (N1) Saugeen Shores Winterhawks vs. (N3) Shelburne Muskies =====
March 21	Saugeen Shores Winterhawks	4 – 3	Shelburne Muskies	Shelburne

March 22	Shelburne Muskies	1 – 6	Saugeen Shores Winterhawks	Saugeen Shores

March 27	Shelburne Muskies	2 – 7	Saugeen Shores Winterhawks	Saugeen Shores

March 28	Saugeen Shores Winterhawks	0 – 6	Shelburne Muskies	Shelburne

April 3	Shelburne Muskies	5 – 4	Saugeen Shores Winterhawks	Saugeen Shores

April 5	Saugeen Shores Winterhawks	2 – 5	Shelburne Muskies	Shelburne

April 7	Shelburne Muskies	2 – 3	OT	Saugeen Shores Winterhawks	Saugeen Shores

Saugeen Shores wins series 4 – 3

===== (S1) Petrolia Squires vs. (S3) Tavistock Royals =====
March 20	Tavistock Royals	5 – 7	Petrolia Squires	Petrolia

March 24	Petrolia Squires	2 – 5	Tavistock Royals	Tavistock

March 27	Tavistock Royals	2 – 5	Petrolia Squires	Petrolia

March 28	Petrolia Squires	4 – 8	Tavistock Royals	Tavistock

April 3	Tavistock Royals	2 – 5	Petrolia Squires	Petrolia

April 4	Petrolia Squires	3 – 7	Tavistock Royals	Tavistock

April 7	Tavistock Royals	9 – 1	Petrolia Squires	Petrolia

Tavistock wins series 4 – 3

==== WOAA Sr. AA Championship ====
Note: Saugeen Shores home games held at Southampton Coliseum in Saugeen Shores, Ontario.

===== (N1) Saugeen Shores Winterhawks vs. (S3) Tavistock Royals =====
April 10	Tavistock Royals	3 – 4	Saugeen Shores Winterhawks	Saugeen Shores

April 11	Saugeen Shores Winterhawks	6 – 2	Tavistock Royals	Tavistock

April 17	Tavistock Royals	4 – 5	Saugeen Shores Winterhawks	Saugeen Shores

April 19	Saugeen Shores Winterhawks	5 – 6	OT	Tavistock Royals	Tavistock

April 24	Tavistock Royals	4 – 6	Saugeen Shores Winterhawks	Saugeen Shores

Saugeen Shores wins series 4 – 1

=== WOAA Senior "A" Hockey playoffs ===
The eight teams that lost in the "AA" qualifying playoff round participated in the "A" playoffs

Sr. A quarter-finals
N5	Durham	4
N8	Drayton	0
N6	Ripley	1
N7	Lucknow	4
S2	Lucan-Ilderton	4
S8	Goderich	1
S5	Tillsonburg	2
S6	Exeter	4

Sr. A semi-finals
N5	Durham	2
N7	Lucknow	4
S2	Lucan-Ilderton	4
S6	Exeter	0

Sr. A finals
N7	Lucknow	1
S2	Lucan-Ilderton	4

==== WOAA Senior A quarter-finals ====
===== (N5) Durham Thundercats vs. (N8) Drayton Icemen =====
February 27	Drayton Icemen	6 – 7	2OT	Durham Thundercats	Durham

March 1	Durham Thundercats	6 – 2	Drayton Icemen	Drayton

March 6	Drayton Icemen	2 – 8	Durham Thundercats	Durham

March 8	Durham Thundercats	9 – 3	Drayton Icemen	Drayton

Durham wins series 4 – 0

===== (N6) Ripley Wolves vs. (N7) Lucknow Lancers =====
February 27	Lucknow Lancers	2 – 3	Ripley Wolves	Ripley

February 28	Ripley Wolves	4 – 6	Lucknow Lancers	Lucknow

March 6	Lucknow Lancers	6 – 5	Ripley Wolves	Ripley

March 7	Ripley Wolves	2 – 4	Lucknow Lancers	Lucknow

March 13	Lucknow Lancers	3 – 2	Ripley Wolves	Ripley

Lucknow wins series 4 – 1

===== (S2) Lucan-Ilderton Jets vs. (S8) Goderich Pirates =====
February 28	Goderich Pirates	3 – 4	OT	Lucan-Ilderton Jets	Lucan

March 6	Lucan-Ilderton Jets	5 – 2	Goderich Pirates	Goderich

March 7	Goderich Pirates	4 – 5	OT	Lucan-Ilderton Jets	Lucan

March 8	Lucan-Ilderton Jets	8 – 11	Goderich Pirates	Goderich

March 14	Goderich Pirates	4 – 9	Lucan-Ilderton Jets	Lucan

Lucan-Ilderton wins series 4 – 1

===== (S5) Tillsonburg Thunder vs. (S6) Exeter Mohawks =====
March 1	Exeter Mohawks	7 – 6	Tillsonburg Thunder	Tillsonburg

March 6	Tillsonburg Thunder	4 – 8	Exeter Mohawks	Exeter

March 8	Exeter Mohawks	3 – 6	Tillsonburg Thunder	Tillsonburg

March 13	Tillsonburg Thunder	12 – 6	Exeter Mohawks	Exeter

March 14	Exeter Mohawks	6 – 5	Tillsonburg Thunder	Tillsonburg

March 15	Tillsonburg Thunder	3 – 4	OT	Exeter Mohawks	Exeter

Exeter wins series 4 – 2

==== WOAA Senior A semi-finals ====
===== (N5) Durham Thundercats vs. (N7) Lucknow Lancers =====
March 20	Lucknow Lancers	5 – 4	Durham Thundercats	Durham

March 21	Durham Thundercats	2 – 5	Lucknow Lancers	Lucknow

March 27	Lucknow Lancers	5 – 9	Durham Thundercats	Durham

March 28	Durham Thundercats	4 – 8	Lucknow Lancers	Lucknow

March 29	Lucknow Lancers	4 – 5	OT	Durham Thundercats	Durham

April 5	Durham Thundercats	3 – 4	OT	Lucknow Lancers	Lucknow

Lucknow wins series 4 – 2

===== (S2) Lucan-Ilderton Jets vs. (S6) Exeter Mohawks =====
March 21	Exeter Mohawks	1 – 5	Lucan-Ilderton Jets	Lucan

March 22	Lucan-Ilderton Jets	6 – 3	Exeter Mohawks	Exeter

March 25	Exeter Mohawks	4 – 6	Lucan-Ilderton Jets	Lucan

March 28	Lucan-Ilderton Jets	3 – 0	Exeter Mohawks	Exeter

Lucan-Ilderton wins series 4 – 0

==== WOAA Sr. A Championship ====
===== (S2) Lucan-Ilderton Jets vs. (N7) Lucknow Lancers =====
Note: Games three and five were played at Ilderton Arena in Ilderton, Ontario

April 10	Lucknow Lancers	2 – 6	Lucan-Ilderton Jets	Lucan

April 11	Lucan-Ilderton Jets	8 – 4	Lucknow Lancers	Lucknow

April 18	Lucknow Lancers	5 – 4	Lucan-Ilderton Jets	Lucan

April 19	Lucan-Ilderton Jets	4 – 3	Lucknow Lancers	Lucknow

April 24	Lucknow Lancers	5 – 6	Lucan-Ilderton Jets	Lucan

Lucan-Ilderton wins series 4 – 1

=== WOAA Senior "B" Hockey playoffs ===
The Milverton Four Wheel Drives, Shallow Lake Crushers, Thedford Dirty Dogs and Walkerton Capitals participated in the Senior "B" playoffs.

==== WOAA Senior B semi-finals ====
===== (N9) Walkerton Capitals vs. (N10) Shallow Lake Crushers =====
February 6	Walkerton Capitals	3 – 6	Shallow Lake Crushers	Shallow Lake

February 7	Shallow Lake Crushers	7 – 5	Walkerton Capitals	Walkerton

February 13	Shallow Lake Crushers	5 – 6	Walkerton Capitals	Walkerton

February 20	Walkerton Capitals	2 – 4	Shallow Lake Crushers	Shallow Lake

February 21	Shallow Lake Crushers	2 – 3	Walkerton Capitals	Walkerton

February 27	Walkerton Capitals	3 – 5	Shallow Lake Crushers	Shallow Lake

Shallow Lake wins series 4 – 2

===== (S9) Milverton Four Wheel Drives vs. (S10) Thedford Dirty Dogs =====
February 6	Thedford Dirty Dogs	4 – 5	Milverton Four Wheel Drives	Milverton

February 7	Milverton Four Wheel Drives	4 – 3	OT	Thedford Dirty Dogs	Thedford

February 13	Thedford Dirty Dogs	2 – 8	Milverton Four Wheel Drives	Milverton

February 14	Milverton Four Wheel Drives	3 – 2	Thedford Dirty Dogs	Thedford

Milverton wins series 4 – 0

==== WOAA Senior B finals ====
===== (S9) Milverton Four Wheel Drives vs. (N10) Shallow Lake Crushers =====
March 6	Milverton Four Wheel Drives	7 – 3	Shallow Lake Crusheres	Shallow Lake

March 14	Shallow Lake Crusheres	7 – 6	OT	Milverton Four Wheel Drives	Milverton

March 15	Shallow Lake Crusheres	3 – 4	Milverton Four Wheel Drives	Milverton

March 20	Milverton Four Wheel Drives	7 – 2	Shallow Lake Crusheres	Shallow Lake

March 22	Shallow Lake Crusheres	2 – 1	Milverton Four Wheel Drives	Milverton

March 27	Milverton Four Wheel Drives	6 – 3	Shallow Lake Crusheres	Shallow Lake

Milverton wins series 4 – 2
