= Elora Rocks =

- City: Elora, Ontario
- League: Ontario Elite Hockey League
- Home arena: Jefferson Elora Community Centre
- Colours: Red, blue, and white
- General manager: Cassie Silverthorn; Rich Wigmore
- Head coach: Marc Hodgkinson; Mike Manuel

The Elora Rocks are a senior hockey team based out of Elora, Ontario, Canada. They play in the Ontario Elite Hockey League.

== History ==
=== Northern Senior A Hockey League ===
In the early 1990s, the Elora Rocks were members of the Northern Senior A Hockey League, winning their final two league titles before jumping to the WOAA in 1993.

=== WOAA ===
Elora has captured the WOAA Sr. "AA" championship three times. Their first championship was in the 2004-05 season, followed by wins in 2006-07 and 2009-10.

The team played in the WOAA from 1993 until 2021.

=== WOSHL ===
On April 21, 2021, the Rocks announced that they were joining the newly formed Western Ontario Super Hockey League. Elora became the inaugural WOSHL champion in the 2021–22 season.

=== OEHL ===
On May 23, 2025, it was announced that the Rocks were joining the Ontario Elite Hockey League for the 2025-26 season.

== Season-by-season record ==
Note: GP = Games played, W = Wins, L = Losses, T= Tie, OTL = Overtime Losses, Pts = Points, GF = Goals for, GA = Goals against

Season	GP	W	L	T	OTL	GF	GA	PTS	Finish	Playoffs
1984-85	24	23	0	1	-	--	--	47	1st CICHL	
1985-86	28	19	7	2	-	149	103	40	1st CICHL	
1986-87	30	13	11	6	-	165	145	32	4th CSBHL	
1987-88	24	11	10	3	-	135	135	25	4th CSBHL	Lost semi-final
1988-89	25	10	11	4	-	111	94	24	4th CSBHL	Lost semi-final
1989-90	28	18	8	2	-	167	96	38	2nd NSBHL	
1990-91	24	11	11	2	-	139	141	24	4th NSAHL	Lost final
1991-92	23	15	6	2	-	--	--	32	2nd NSAHL	Won League, lost OHA Final
1993–94	20	5	11	4	-	133	93	14	9th WOAA Sr. A	Did not qualify
1994–95	24	16	7	1	0	143	80	33	5th WOAA Sr. A	Won in "AA" quarter-finals (4-1 vs. Drives); Lost in "AA" semi-finals (2-4 vs. Thundercats)
1995–96	24	16	8	0	0	118	108	32	2nd WOAA Sr. AA	Won in "AA" quarter-finals (4-0 vs. Merchants); Lost in "AA" semi-finals (2-4 vs. Winterhawks)
1996–97	24	4	18	0	2	85	149	10	5th WOAA Sr. AA	Lost in "AA" preliminary round (2-3 vs. Drives)
1997–98	26	6	16	1	3	93	155	16	5th WOAA Sr. AA	Lost in "AA" preliminary round (1-3 vs. Merchants)
1998–99	24	6	13	4	1	91	138	17	4th WOAA Sr. AA	Lost in "AA" semi-finals (1-4 vs. Drives)
1999–2000	24	6	15	1	2	92	139	15	6th in North	Won "A" qualify round-robin (3-1 vs. Lancers & Redmen); Won "A" divisional semi-finals (4-3 vs. Lancers); Lost "A" finals (1-4 vs. Wildcats)
2000–01	24	13	9	1	1	108	83	28	4th in North	Lost "AA" quarter-finals (2-4 vs. Drives)
2001–02	24	10	10	3	1	110	106	24	4th in South	Lost "AA" quarter-finals (0-4 vs. Drives)
2002–03	24	12	10	1	1	107	93	26	9th WOAA	Won "A" quarter-finals (4-0 vs. Crusaders); Lost "A" semi-finals (2-4 vs. River Rats)
2003–04	24	18	6	0	0	147	75	36	4th WOAA	Won "AA" qualifying round (3-0 vs. Royals); Won "AA" quarter-finals (4-2 vs. Drives); Lost "AA" semi-finals (2-4 vs. Thundercats)
2004–05	25	19	4	2	0	180	84	40	1st WOAA	Won "AA" qualifying round (3-0 vs. Pirates); Won "AA" quarter-finals (4-2 vs. Thundercats); Won "AA" semi-finals (4-1 vs. 81's); Won "AA" finals (4-0 vs. Radars)
2005–06	25	21	3	-	1	176	76	43	2nd WOAA	Won "AA" qualifying round (3-0 vs. Monarchs); Won "AA" quarter-finals (4-0 vs. Jets); Won "AA" semi-finals (4-2 vs. Muskies); Lost "AA" finals (1-4 vs. Thundercats)
2006–07	24	16	5	-	3	163	100	35	3rd in North	Won "AA" quarter-finals (4-2 vs. Jets); Won "AA" semi-finals (4-0 vs. Lancers); Won "AA" finals (4-3 vs. Royals)
2007–08	26	22	2	-	2	197	74	46	2nd in North	Won "AA" quarter-finals (4-0 vs. Jets); Won "AA" semi-finals (4-2 vs. Winterhawks); Lost "AA" finals (1-4 vs. Royals)
2008–09	20	16	4	-	0	140	64	32	2nd in North	Won "AA" qualifying round (4-1 vs. Lancers); Lost "AA" quarter-finals (2-4 vs. Muskies)
2009–10	20	20	0	-	0	152	72	40	1st in North	Won "AA" qualifying round (3-0 vs. Crushers); Won "AA" quarter-finals (4-2 vs. Wolves); Won "AA" semi-finals (4-0 vs. Winterhawks); Won "AA" finals (4-2 vs. Squires)
2010–11	26	20	6	-	0	170	87	40	2nd in North	Won divisional quarter-finals (4-0 vs. Thundercats); Won divisional semi-finals (4-1 vs. Muskies); Lost divisional finals (1-4 vs. Winterhawks)
2011–12	24	17	4	-	3	144	92	37	2nd in North	Won divisional quarter-finals (4-1 vs. Crushers); Won divisional semi-finals (4-2 vs. Muskies); Lost divisional finals (0-4 vs. Winterhawks)
2012–13	24	19	4	-	1	161	91	39	1st in North	Won divisional quarter-finals (4-0 vs. Lancers); Won divisional semi-finals (4-1 vs. Wolves); Lost divisional finals (2-4 vs. Winterhawks)
2013–14	24	18	3	-	3	161	88	39	2nd in North	Won divisional quarter-finals (4-0 vs. Muskies); Won divisional semi-finals (4-1 vs. Winterhawks); Lost divisional finals (0-4 vs. 81's)
2014–15	24	16	8	-	0	147	93	32	4th in North	Lost divisional semi-finals (2-4 vs. Thundercats)
2016–17	20	3	17	-	0	81	141	6	14th WOAA	Won "A" quarter-finals (2-1 vs. Muskies); Lost "A" semi-finals (0-4 vs. Centenaires)
2017–18	20	2	15	-	3	49	124	7	13th WOAA	Lost "A" quarter-finals (1-2 vs. Lancers)
2018–19	22	9	12	-	1	77	102	19	11th WOAA	Won "A" quarter-finals (2-0 vs. Lancers); Won "A" semi-finals (4-1 vs. Muskies); Lost "A" finals (2-4 vs. Drives)
2019–20	22	8	13	-	1	83	109	17	10th WOAA	Lost "A" semi-finals (2-4 vs. Drives)
2020–21	Season cancelled due to COVID-19									
2021–22	20	17	3	-	0	138	38	34	1st in WOSHL	Won semi-finals (4-0 vs. Fighting Irish); Won finals (4-2 vs. Thunder)
2022–23	24	18	4	-	2	147	75	38	2nd in WOSHL	Won quarter-finals (3-0 vs. Killer Bees); Lost semi-finals (0-4 vs. Fighting Irish)
2023–24	24	10	12	-	2	108	118	22	8th in WOSHL	Won preliminary round one (6-2 vs. Blitz); Won preliminary round two (7-3 vs. Flames); Lost quarter-finals (0-3 vs. Fighting Irish)
2024–25	24	15	8	-	1	136	112	31	2nd in WOSHL	Lost quarter-finals (1-4 vs. Jets)
2025–26	20	14	6	-	0	118	78	28	3rd in South	Won in divisional quarter-finals (4-1 vs. Aeros); Won in divisional semi-finals (4-1 vs. Squires); Lost in divisional finals (1-4 vs. Centenaires)
