= Central Ontario Hockey League =

Ice hockey league in Ontario, Canada

The Central Ontario Hockey League (COHL) was a highly competitive Intermediate ice hockey league in the central Grey County area of Ontario, Canada until the late 1970s. The league was originally sanctioned by the Ontario Hockey Association, but later the Western Ontario Athletic Association incorporated it into their WOAA Senior Hockey League.

== History ==
The COHL was a Southwestern Ontario Intermediate level league. All Intermediate was merged with Senior in 1986, but this league was merged into the WOAA Intermediate Hockey League in 1980. The WOAA now exists as a Senior "AA" hockey league.

The league was fed new players by the local Central Junior C Hockey League, under that name from 1960 until 1980, is now known as the Western Junior C Hockey League. The league was supported by the local Northern Junior D Hockey League, which folded in 1985.

Their 1976-77 season was very competitive. The top team in the league was Dromore, followed by Badjeros, Dundalk, Priceville, El-Ron, Flesherton, and Markdale. The next year, they were joined by the Shelburne Muskies. They jumped to the Ontario Hockey Association Senior ranks in 1980, and the rest of the league was absorbed by the WOAA. They stayed under their name as a division of the WOAA until 1982, when they were fully integrated into the league.

== Former Member Teams ==
- Badjeros
- Barhead Blues
- Chatsworth
- Creemore Chiefs
- Dundalk Flyers
- Durham Flyers
- Dromore
- El-Ron Inn
- Feversham
- Flesherton Saints
- Glenelg
- Honeywood
- Markdale Majors
- Meaford
- Priceville
- Rocklyn
- Shelburne Muskies
- Thornbury
- Williamsford

== Champions ==
- 1982 Shelburne Muskies
- 1981 Honeywood
- 1980 Dundalk Flyers
- 1979 Dundalk Flyers
- 1978
- 1976
- 1975 Barhead Blues
- 1974
- 1973
- 1972 Shelburne Muskies
- 1971
