= Nathan Perrott =

Canadian boxer and ice hockey player

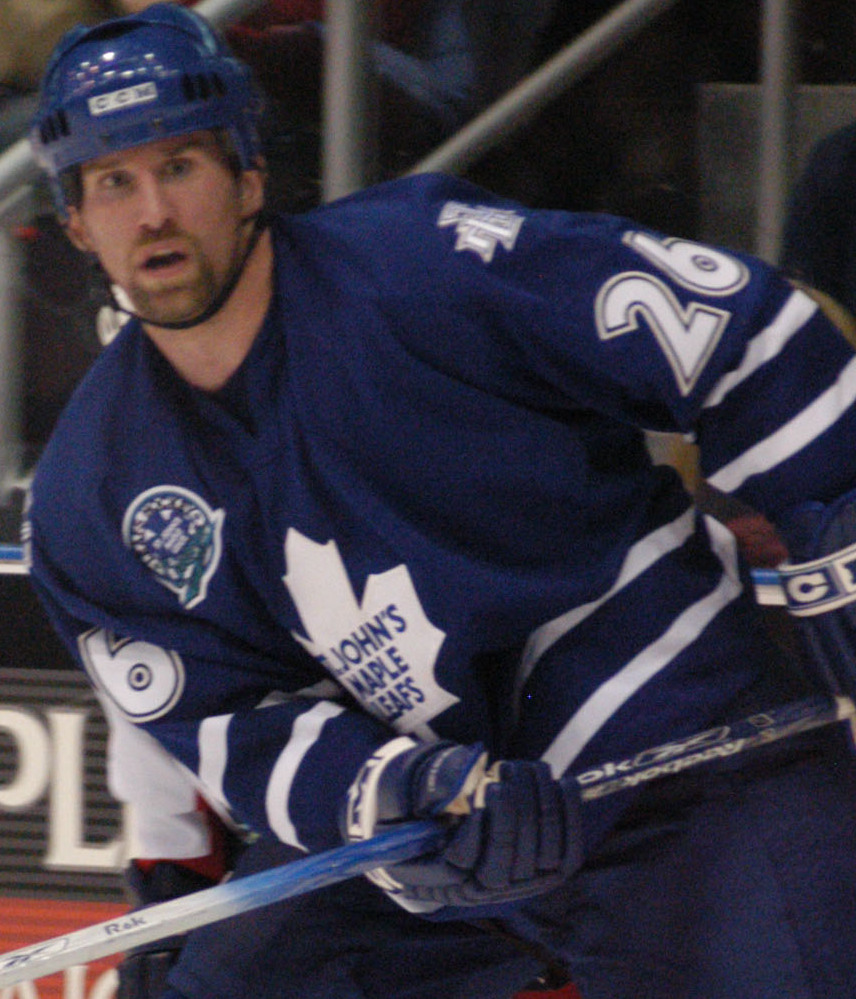
- Perrott with the St. John's Maple Leafs in 2004
- Born: December 8, 1976 (age 49) Wingham, Ontario, Canada
- Height: 6 ft 0 in (183 cm)
- Weight: 225 lb (102 kg; 16 st 1 lb)
- Position: Right wing
- Shot: Right
- Played for: Nashville Predators; Toronto Maple Leafs; Dallas Stars; Vityaz Chekhov
- NHL draft: 44th overall, 1995; New Jersey Devils
- Playing career: 1997–2010

Nathan A. Perrott (born December 8, 1976) is a Canadian professional boxer and former professional ice hockey player. He played in the National Hockey League with the Nashville Predators, Toronto Maple Leafs, and Dallas Stars between 2001 and 2006. He currently works as a fire fighter at Bruce Power in Tiverton, Ontario.

== Hockey career ==
Perrott was drafted by the New Jersey Devils in the second round of the 1995 NHL entry draft, with the 44th overall pick. Unsigned by New Jersey, he became a member of the Chicago Blackhawks for three and a half years before being traded to the Nashville Predators in 2001.

He made his NHL debut with Nashville during the 2001–02 NHL season, registering 3 points and 74 penalty minutes in 21 games. Perrott scored his first NHL goal on April 6, 2002, against the Calgary Flames Roman Turek. Perrott continued to play within the Nashville organization before being traded to the Toronto Maple Leafs in 2003 for Bob Wren. In the 2003–04 NHL season, Perrott was a long shot to crack the Maple Leafs roster but spent the entire season playing in Toronto, registering 3 points and 174 penalty minutes in 40 games.

At the beginning of the 2005–06 NHL season was traded to the Dallas Stars for a 6th round draft pick (used to select Leo Komarov, an eventual NHL All-Star).

Unable to find work with an NHL club, Perrott played parts of the 2008–09 season with Vityaz Chekhov of the Kontinental Hockey League.

Since his tour in Russia, Perrott came back to Ontario to play senior hockey with the Walkerton Capitals of the WOAA Senior AA Hockey League.

== Boxing career ==
Known for his willingness to fight during games, it was reported September 5, 2009 that Perrott had retired from professional hockey to focus on a potential career in boxing. Perrott won his debut fight on September 11, 2009, when he defeated Makidi Ku Ntima via TKO in the fourth round.

== Career statistics ==
=== Regular season and playoffs ===
			Regular season					Playoffs
Season	Team	League	GP	G	A	Pts	PIM	GP	G	A	Pts	PIM
1992–93	Walkerton Hawks	WOJCHL	25	6	13	19	45	—	—	—	—	—
1993–94	St. Marys Lincolns	WOHL	41	11	26	37	249	—	—	—	—	—
1994–95	Oshawa Generals	OHL	63	18	28	46	233	2	1	1	2	9
1995–96	Oshawa Generals	OHL	59	30	32	62	158	5	2	3	5	8
1995–96	Albany River Rats	AHL	4	0	0	0	12	—	—	—	—	—
1996–97	Oshawa Generals	OHL	5	1	0	1	17	—	—	—	—	—
1996–97	Sault Ste. Marie Greyhounds	OHL	37	18	23	41	120	11	5	5	10	60
1997–98	Jacksonville Lizard Kings	ECHL	30	6	8	14	135	—	—	—	—	—
1997–98	Indianapolis Ice	IHL	31	4	3	7	76	—	—	—	—	—
1998–99	Indianapolis Ice	IHL	72	14	11	25	307	7	3	1	4	45
1999–00	Cleveland Lumberjacks	IHL	65	12	9	21	248	9	2	1	3	19
2000–01	Norfolk Admirals	AHL	73	11	17	28	268	9	2	0	2	18
2001–02	Nashville Predators	NHL	22	1	2	3	74	—	—	—	—	—
2001–02	Norfolk Admirals	AHL	2	0	0	0	5	—	—	—	—	—
2001–02	Milwaukee Admirals	AHL	56	6	10	16	190	—	—	—	—	—
2002–03	Nashville Predators	NHL	1	0	0	0	5	—	—	—	—	—
2002–03	Milwaukee Admirals	AHL	27	1	2	3	106	—	—	—	—	—
2002–03	St. John's Maple Leafs	AHL	36	7	8	15	97	—	—	—	—	—
2003–04	Toronto Maple Leafs	NHL	40	1	2	3	116	—	—	—	—	—
2004–05	St. John's Maple Leafs	AHL	60	16	12	28	276	2	0	0	0	6
2005–06	Toronto Maple Leafs	NHL	3	0	0	0	2	—	—	—	—	—
2005–06	Dallas Stars	NHL	23	2	1	3	54	—	—	—	—	—
2006–07	Toronto Marlies	AHL	4	0	0	0	19	—	—	—	—	—
2006–07	Summum-Chiefs de Saint-Jean-sur-Richelieu	LNAH	2	0	1	1	10	—	—	—	—	—
2007–08	Toronto Marlies	AHL	4	0	0	0	12	—	—	—	—	—
2007–08	Vityaz Chekhov	RSL	15	0	1	1	98	—	—	—	—	—
2008–09	Vityaz Chekhov	KHL	9	0	0	0	137	—	—	—	—	—
2009–10	Texas Brahmas	CHL	31	3	8	11	139	—	—	—	—	—
2010–11	Walkerton Capitals	WOAA	18	9	3	12	40	2	0	1	1	0
2011–12	Walkerton Capitals	WOAA	6	1	2	3	19	—	—	—	—	—
AHL totals			266	41	49	90	985	11	2	0	2	24
KHL totals			9	0	0	0	137	—	—	—	—	—
NHL totals			89	4	5	9	251	—	—	—	—	—

== Professional boxing record ==
1 Wins (1 knockout, 0 decisions), 3 Losses, 0 Draws Archived March 21, 2015, at the Wayback Machine
Result	Record	Opponent	Type	Round	Date	Location	Notes
Loss	1–3	(Canada) Bradley Hamil	TKO	4 (4), 2:59	19/05/2017	(Canada) Hershey Centre, Mississauga, Ontario	
Loss	1–2	(Russia) Artem Lipanov	TKO	1 (4), 2:59	30/06/2010	(Canada) Casino Rama, Rama, Ontario	
Loss	1–1	(United States) Jon Bolden	TKO	1 (4), 2:09	04/12/2009	(United States) The Blue Horizon, Philadelphia, Pennsylvania	
Win	1–0	(United States) Makidi Ku Ntima	TKO	4 (4), 2:52	11/09/2009	(United States) The Blue Horizon, Philadelphia, Pennsylvania	
