= Lucknow Lancers =

- City: Lucknow, Ontario
- League: Ontario Elite Hockey League
- Operated: 1984-present
- Home arena: Lucknow & District Sports Complex
- Colours: Red, Black, and Yellow
- General manager: Chris Michie
- Head coach: Russ Sutton
- Website: lucknowlancers.com

The Lucknow Lancers are a senior hockey team based out of Lucknow, Ontario, Canada. They play in the Ontario Elite Hockey League of the Ontario Hockey Association and Hockey Canada.

== Championships ==
In 1996–97, Lucknow captured the Senior "B" championship, and in 1988-89, they were Intermediate "D" champs.

== 2006–07 Lancers season ==
Lucknow, coming off an 18-6-1 record in 2005-06, had the best record in the regular season in 2006-07, going 20-2-2. The Lancers finished the season on a 12-0-1 streak, and they scored a season high fifteen goals in a 15-6 win over the Drayton Icemen on October 22.

In the opening round of the "AA" playoffs against the Hensall Sherwoods, the teams would split the first two games of the series before Lucknow would win three in a row to eliminate the Sherwoods, including a convincing 6-1 win in the fifth game.

In the semi-finals, the Lancers faced the Elora Rocks and lost the opening game in Lucknow, losing 6-5 in double OT. Lucknow could never really rebound after that loss and dropped the next game, 6-3 in Elora. The series shifted back to Lucknow for game three, and once again, the Lancers lost in overtime, 3-2, to fall behind 3-0 in the series. The Rocks would complete the sweep by beating Lucknow 3-2 in the fourth game in Elora, ending the Lancers season a lot sooner than anyone would have thought.

== 2007–08 Lancers season ==
Due to expansion in the league, the defending North Division champions would move over into the South Division. The Lancers first season in the South saw the team have its worst season since 2001-02, as they would have a 14-12-0 record, earning 28 points, which was fourteen less points than the 42 they finished the year before. Lucknow finished in fifth in the South, earning a spot in the "A playoffs.

The Lancers opened the playoffs against the Drayton Icemen, and it was the Drayton who took a 1-0 series lead with a 2-1 victory in the series opener. Lucknow tied the series up in game two with some solid goaltending, defeating the Icemen 3-2. The series moved to Drayton for the next two games, but it was Lucknow who kept winning, taking a 3-1 series lead, and the Lancers clinched the series in the fifth game, shutting out the Icemen 10-0, advancing to the semi-finals.

Lucknow faced the Milverton Four Wheel Drives in the "A" semi-finals, and Milverton opened the series up with a 3-2 win. The Lancers tied the series in the second game, shutting out the Drives 2-0. Milverton once again took the series lead in game three, with a 5-4 win, however, Lucknow would again tie the series, winning the fourth game 5-2. It looked as if the teams exchanging wins would continue in the fifth game, as Milverton held a 5-3 lead in the third period, but Lucknow stormed back, scoring two goals in fifty seconds, to send the game into overtime. The Lancers completed the comeback with a goal in the extra period to take a 3-2 series lead. The Drives would tie the series up with a solid 9-6 win in the sixth game, setting up a seventh and deciding game. The Lancers would manage to hold off Milverton by a 5-4 score, and advance to the "A" finals.

The Lancers would face the Palmerston 81's for the "A" championship, and they would take an early series lead, defeating Palmerston 5-4 in the series opener. The 81's rebounded, taking the next two games by scores of 6-4 and 7-1 to take a 2-1 series lead. The Lancers would even it up in the fourth game, handing the 81's a 7-5 loss, and evening the series up at two games each. Palmerston would dominate the fifth game, winning 7-3, and take a 3-2 series lead. The Lancers and 81's would play a very close sixth game, however, it would be Palmerston winning the game 3-2, and winning the series 4-2, ending the Lancers season two wins short of the "A" championship.

== 2008–09 Lancers season ==
Once again due to expansion, the Lancers shifted divisions, as they were placed back in the North Division. The team would continue to struggle, as they posted a record of 9-9-2, earning 20 points, which was their lowest total since the 2001-02 season. Lucknow finished in seventh place in the North Division.

The Lancers faced off against the Elora Rocks in the best of seven "AA" qualifying series. Elora cruised to a 6-1 victory in the first game, however, Lucknow evened the series up with a solid 3-1 win in the second game. The Rocks once again took the series lead in the third game, defeating the Lancers 5-3, followed by a blowout Elora victory in the fourth game, in which they won 7-1, to take a 3-1 series lead. The Rocks ended the series in the fifth game, defeating Lucknow 5-3 to send the Lancers to the "A" playoffs.

== 2009–10 Lancers season ==
Lucknow struggled again in the North Division, finishing in a tie for 6th place in the North with 19 points (9-10-1).

The Lancers faced the Saugeen Shores Winterhawks in the "AA" playoffs 1st round, losing in 5 games despite winning the opening game of the series.

Relegated to the "A" playoffs, the Lancers defeated the Palmerston 81's in four-straight games before moving on to face the Durham Thundercats in the "A" semifinal. The Lancers jumped out to a 3-0 series lead and looked to be on their way to the final, but lost the remaining four games of the series and were eliminated.

== 2010–11 Lancers season ==
Lucknow looked to be moving up the ladder in the North Division, finishing 4th of 10 teams with a record of 13-10-3.

The Lancers met the Palmerston 81's in the first round of the "AA" playoffs and would prevail in 6 games. They met up with the Saugeen Shores Winterhawks in a 2nd round series, but fell in four games.

== 2011–12 Lancers season ==
2011–12 proved to be a difficult season for the Lancers, who struggled all season en route to a record of 4-18-2, good enough for 8th place in the 9-team North Division.

The Lancers would have their season ended in the first round of the "AA" playoffs at the hands of the eventual-champion Saugeen Shores Winterhawks in a four-game sweep.

== 2012–13 Lancers season ==
The Lancers struggled again in a competitive North Division, posting a franchise-worst record of 3-21-0.

The Lancers qualified for the "AA" playoffs in the North Division by virtue of there only being 8 teams remaining in the division. The Lancers fell in four-straight games to the Elora Rocks in the opening round of the playoffs and were relegated to the returning "A" championship side.

The Lancers would get some silver-lining from their season, sweeping the Thedford Dirty Dogs in a best-of-3 series and moved on to a round-robin playoff with the Shallow Lake Crushers and Durham Thundercats to determine the final series for the "A" championship.

== Season-by-season record ==
Note: GP = Games played, W = Wins, L = Losses, T= Tie, OTL = Overtime Losses, Pts = Points, GF = Goals for, GA = Goals against

Season	GP	W	L	T	OTL	GF	GA	PTS	Finish	Playoffs
1984–85	24	8	13	3	–	151	149	19	4th in "D"	Won in "D" quarter-finals (4-0 vs. Saints); Lost in "D" finals (1-4 vs. Roosters)
1985–86	18	9	8	1	–	112	103	19	6th in WOAA	Lost in "D" semi-finals (1-3 vs. Monarchs)
1986–87	22	11	6	5	–	136	119	27	2nd in North	Lost in "B" semi-finals (1-4 vs. Crusaders)
1987–88	18	5	10	3	–	91	101	13	5th in North	Won in "D" semi-finals (4-1 vs. Comets); Lost in "D" finals (2-4 vs. Roosters)
1988–89	21	7	13	1	–	121	144	15	5th in North	Won in "D" semi-finals (3-2 vs. Roosters); Won in "D" finals (3-2 vs. Drives); Won in Grand Championship semi-finals (3-1 vs. North Stars); Lost in Grand Championship finals (0-3 vs. Thundercats)
1989–90	21	10	9	2	–	135	134	22	5th in North	Lost in "C" semi-finals (1-3 vs. Wolves)
1990–91	24	5	14	5	–	139	189	15	7th in North	Lost in "C" semi-finals (1-3 vs. Comets)
1991–92	21	14	6	1	–	130	97	29	2nd in "B"	Won in "B" quarter-finals (3-1 vs. Wolves); Won in "B" semi-finals (3-0 vs. Monarchs); Lost in "B" finals (0-3 vs. North Stars)
1992–93	21	11	7	3	–	145	122	25	3rd in "B"	Lost in "B" quarter-finals (2-3 vs. North Stars)
1993–94	20	11	9	0	–	139	101	22	4th in "B"	Won in "B" quarter-finals (3-1 vs. Flyers); Lost in "B" semi-finals (1-4 vs. Wolves)
1994–95	23	18	5	0	0	147	83	36	2nd in "B"	Lost in "B" semi-finals (2-4 vs. Flyers)
1995–96	16	8	7	1	0	85	66	17	3rd in "B"	Won in "B" semi-finals (4-2 vs. Monarchs); Lost in "B" finals (0-4 vs. Flyers)
1996–97	24	18	5	0	1	157	91	37	2nd in "B"	Won in "B" semi-finals (4-0 vs. Monarchs); Won in "B" finals (4-1 vs. Flyers)
1997–98	24	17	4	0	3	125	76	37	1st in "A" West	Lost in "A" quarter-finals (3-4 vs. Pirates)
1998–99	24	13	10	1	0	124	95	27	2nd in "A" West	Lost in "A" quarter-finals (3-4 vs. Radar)
1999–00	24	1	23	0	0	67	201	2	7th North	Won in "A" round robin (2-2 record); Lost in "A" semi-finals (3-4 vs. Rocks)
2000–01	24	5	18	0	1	65	127	11	7th North	Lost in "A" quarter-finals (3-4 vs. River Rats)
2001–02	24	1	22	0	1	70	175	3	7th North	Won in "A" round robin (2-2 record); Lost in "A" semi-finals (0-4 vs. Spitfires)
2002–03	24	16	6	0	2	129	85	34	4th WOAA	Lost in "AA" quarter-finals (1-4 vs. Sherwoods); Lost in "A" tier II semi-finals (2-4 vs. Muskies)
2003–04	24	18	6	0	0	137	65	36	3rd WOAA	Won in "AA" qualifying round (3-0 vs. Pirates); Lost in "AA" quarter-finals (3-4 vs. Sherwoods)
2004–05	25	15	7	3	0	138	93	33	10th WOAA	Lost in "AA" qualifying round (2-3 vs. Drives); Won in "A" quarter-finals (4-0 vs. Spitfires); Won in "A" semi-finals (4-0 vs. Jets); Lost in "A" finals (1-4 vs. Jets)
2005–06	25	18	6	-	1	133	79	37	4th in WOAA	Won in "AA" qualifying round (3-0 vs. River Rats); Won in "AA" quarter-finals (4-3 vs. Royals); Lost in "AA" semi-finals (0-4 vs. Thundercats)
2006–07	24	20	2	-	2	154	75	42	1st in North	Won in "AA" quarter-finals (4-1 vs. Sherwoods); Lost in "AA" semi-finals (0-4 vs. Rocks)
2007–08	26	14	12	-	0	119	120	28	5th in South	Won in "A" quarter-finals (4-1 vs. Icemen); Won in "A" semi-finals (4-3 vs. Drives); Lost in "A" finals (2-4 vs. 81's)
2008–09	20	9	9	-	2	89	83	20	7th in North	Lost in "AA" qualifying round (1-4 vs. Rocks); Won in "A" quarter-finals (4-1 vs. Wolves); Won in "A" semi-finals (4-2 vs. Thundercats); Lost in "A" finals (1-4 vs. Jets)
2009–10	20	9	10	-	1	101	98	19	6th in North	Lost in "AA" qualifying round (2-3 vs. Winterhawks); Won in "A" quarter-finals (4-0 vs. 81's); Lost in "A" semi-finals (3-4 vs. Thundercats)
2010–11	26	13	10	-	3	110	120	29	4th in North	Won in "AA" quarter-finals (4-2 vs. 81's); Lost in "AA" semi-finals (0-4 vs. Winterhawks)
2011–12	24	4	18	-	2	74	124	10	8th in North	Lost in "AA" quarter-finals (0-4 vs. Winterhawks)
2012–13	24	3	21	-	0	69	175	6	8th in North	Lost in "AA" quarter-finals (0-4 vs. 81's)
2013–14	24	3	20	-	1	68	181	7	8th in North	Lost in "AA" quarter-finals (0-4 vs. 81's)
2014–15	24	3	19	-	2	76	155	8	8th in North	Lost in "A" semi-finals (1-4 vs. Crushers)
2015–16	24	5	19	-	0	72	127	10	7th in North	Lost in "A" round robin (1-3 record)
2016–17	20	3	14	-	3	51	115	9	13th WOAA	Lost in "A" quarter-finals (1-2 vs. Crushers)
2017–18	20	3	15	-	2	44	121	8	12th WOAA	Won in "A" quarter-finals (2-1 vs. Rocks); Lost in "A' quarter-finals (1-4 vs. Squires)
2018–19	22	2	20	-	0	58	154	4	14th WOAA	Lost in "A" quarter-finals (0-2 vs. Rocks)
2019–20	22	3	16	-	3	55	132	9	13th WOAA	Won in "A" quarter-finals (2-0 vs. Squires); Lost in "A" semi-finals (0-4 vs. Royals)
2021–22	15	5	10	-	0	47	73	10	10th WOAA	Lost in "A" semi-finals (3-4 vs. Crushers)
2022–23	20	2	18	-	0	38	123	4	12th WOAA	Lost in "A" semi-finals (2-4 vs. Crushers)
2023–24	20	3	16	-	1	42	118	7	11th OEHL	Lost in McLean Cup round robin (1-3 record)
2024–25	20	0	20	-	0	30	151	0	11th OEHL	Lost in McLean Cup round robin (2-2 record)
2025–26	20	4	15	-	1	55	119	9	7th North	Lost in divisional quarter-finals (0-4 vs. 81's)

More information will be added as more becomes available

== See also ==
- Lucknow, Ontario
- Ontario Elite Hockey League
- WOAA Senior Hockey League
