= Durham Thundercats =

- City: Durham, Ontario
- League: Ontario Elite Hockey League
- Division: North
- Founded: 1972
- Home arena: Durham Community Centre
- Colours: Black, Red, and White
- General manager: Jared Rahn
- Head coach: Scott Kuglin
- Website: durhamthundercats.com

Franchise history
- 1972–1988: Durham 72's
- 1988–present: Durham Thundercats

The Durham Thundercats, originally the Durham 72's, are a senior hockey team based out of Durham, Ontario, Canada. The Thundercats are members of the Ontario Elite Hockey League of the Ontario Hockey Association and Hockey Canada. The Thundercats date back to the town's Centennial, 1972, and have been an extremely successful team in all loops of the Western Ontario Athletic Association Senior "AA" Hockey League.

== The 72's ==
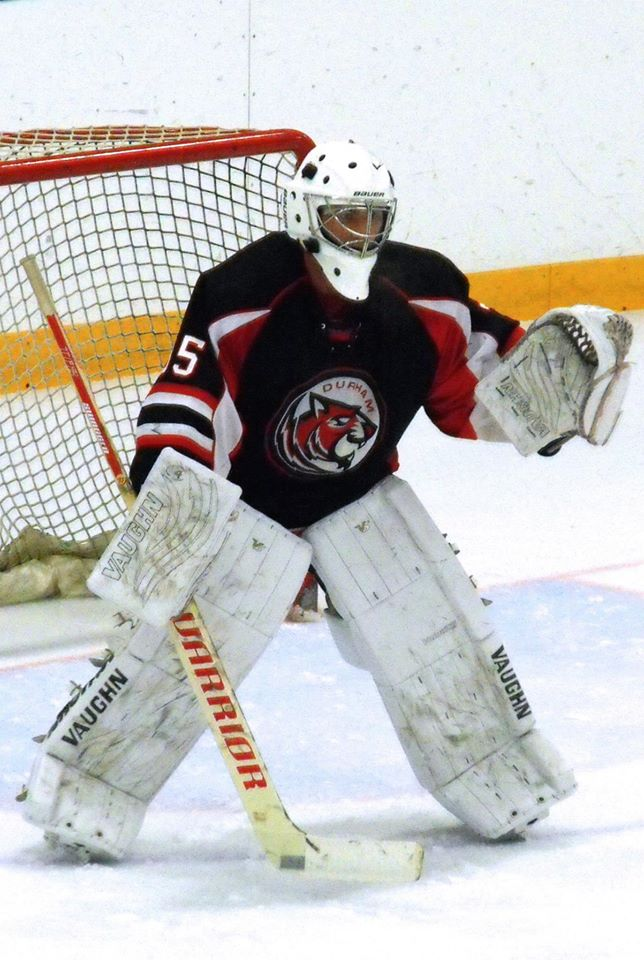
Thundercats goalie during 2014–15 season.

During the 1972 Centennial celebration in Durham, locals decided a second Men's hockey club could succeed and thus put into place the formation of the current Durham Thundercats. Working alongside but playing out of different leagues as the towns established team, the Huskies, the town applied to and was accepted to enter the Western Ontario Athletic Association's Northern league. The organization of this second team allowed many talented local players a place to play competitive Senior Hockey, and would lay the foundation for 40 years of Championship calibre teams.

The Durham 72's, as they were named, were founded as members of the Intermediate "C" loop of the WOAA. Their competition would be found in other local teams like Arthur, Woodford, Thornbury, Elora, and Chatsworth. The 72's finished their first season winning their loop but then lost the Major Intermediate "C" Championship to the Milverton Four Wheel Drives. The next season saw them finish first overall again with 14 wins 4 losses and 2 ties, but fall to Arthur in the loop final.

A third attempt at securing a championship finally paid off as the 72's won the 1975 WOAA Intermediate C championship. Unfortunately, the team would be required to take a two-year hiatus until a new arena was planned & developed. Returning to the ice in 1977/78, the 72's were playing at the Intermediate "B" level and were led by current coach Bruce Marshall. 'Beagle' as he is fondly known, led the league in scoring, (a feat he would repeat in the 1985/86 season) and the 72's defeated Palmerston (later known as the Palmerston 81's) to win the "B" Championship. The 72's were challenged by the Intermediate "C" Champion Lion's Head Northstars for the WOAA Grand Championship and lost a hard-fought battle that would lay the ground work for a tumultuous rivalry that would last for years to come.

Over the course of the next three seasons, Durham would endure successes but fall short of the ultimate goal, including the 1981 defeat at the hands of the Mitchell Red Devils, in the Intermediate "B" final. During the summer of 1981, the league underwent a major restructuring. The disbandment of two other local leagues (Central Grey-Bruce League, CGBHL and the Central Ontario Hockey League, COHL) increased the team numbers in The WOAA and required the creation of the Upper Tier Intermediate A Division and the Lower Tier Intermediate D Division.

Changes in the league format proved to be a good thing for Durham as in 1982, the 72's won their first ever Intermediate "A" Championship, beating Lions Head in seven games. Led by the League's leading scorer in Randy '12' Reay, the 7th and final game was played in Markdale, in front of a sold-out crowd. The next season saw the 72's lose the Intermediate "A" Championship to the Woodford Royals, who in turn lost the Grand Championship to Lion's Head. In 1986, with coach Bev Nixon behind the bench, the 72's were led again by two-time league scoring champ Bruce 'Beagle' Marshall. Ultimately losing to Woodford in the play-offs, changes were again, on the horizon. With new coach Dennis 'Guido' Graham now calling the shots, the 72's moved to the newly formed Northern division with Lucknow, Ripley, Kincardine, Teeswater, and Lion's Head. After finishing first with 16 wins, 4 losses, and 2 ties, they won the Intermediate "A" Championship but lost the Grand Championship in 6 games.

The 1987–88 season would see the end of an era in regards to the Durham 72's. The lackluster season ended early with a record of 6 wins, 6 losses, and 4 ties and the winds of change soon came knocking. This marked the last season the team would be known as the Durham 72's.

== The Thundercats ==
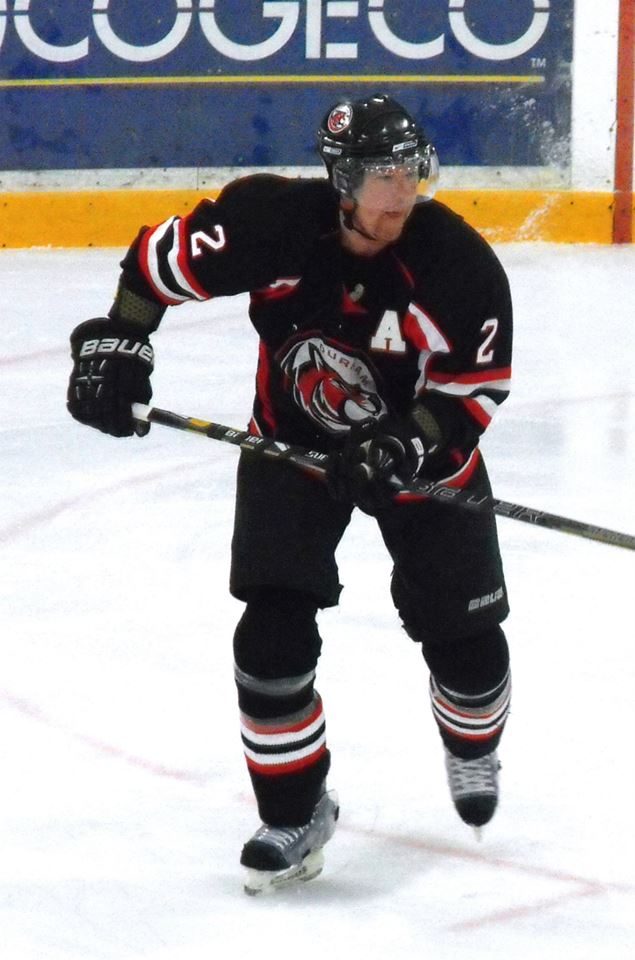
NHL alumni Jeff MacMillan during 2014–15 season.

The summer of 1988 would prove to be a major change for the team known only as the 72's, for the last 16yrs. Given a face lift, they traded in the "72's" for the "Thundercats" and switched the Green and Yellow for the Black and Silver. The effect was instantaneous as the Thundercats would terrorize the league for the next dozen years. Once again a change proved fruitful and the 1988–89 season had the T-Cats finish first in the league with 19 wins, 2 losses, and 2 ties. Solid goaltending from Scott MacMillan, Mark Taylor & Gord McGinnis, along with the 90pt seasons from Steve Reay and Todd Stoddart, they would defeat the Lucknow Lancers to win the Intermediate Grand Championship in their first year.

They followed this up in 1989/90 with another winning season, but lost a memorable hard-fought battle with Kincardine.

Over the course of the next 8yrs, the Thundercats would dominate the WOAA. In the 1990/91 newly formed Senior "A" finals, they were challenged by the Tavistock Royals. A hard-fought series ended when Brian Sweeney would score in overtime in the 6th game and allow the Thundercats to emerge victorious and Senior A Champions. Some members of the team took immediate vacations but halfway through they got word that the WOAA had been attempting to contact them to set up dates for a Grand Championship series with the Arthur Tigers, the Intermediate "B" champions. The 3 out of 5 series would go the distance with Arthur pulling off the upset to win the Grand Championship. The series of course was not without controversy. The two head coaches were longtime friends who would test that friendship severely. A questionable arena malfunction canceled game two in Arthur, which resulted in the series lasting an extra weekend longer. This resulted in the Cats losing the services of a couple of players for the last two games, due to prearranged trip commitments to Florida. Arthur would win game 5 in Durham in front the largest crowd ever (1,000+) people, to claim their only Sr. A Grand Championship.

After the previous years controversy, the Thundercats began the first of two consecutive, three year runs as Champion. Beating Tavistock and Lakeshore respectively in 1992 & 93', they were unopposed WOAA Senior Grand Champions. After winning a third consecutive title in 94' vs Tavistock, they were challenged by the Ripley Wolves. Durham swept the Wolves for their third straight Grand Championship. The once proud OHA Senior loop was now defunct and several teams now joined the WOAA. This required another level of league play and soon the Senior "AA" Level was adopted. The new teams and influx of OHA talent into the league also created an interesting challenge for the Thundercats, who only added 4 players from the now defunct OHA Durham Huskies.

In 1995, the T-Cats proved human and lost to the Tavistock Royals in the sixth game of the Senior "AA" championship. The rivalry of the late 70's and early 80's with Lions Head was now back seat to the dislike these two teams developed for each other over the course of the last 4 years. 3 Senior AA Championship series against each other would forge a lifetime of memories, and even a couple of friendships. The T-cats would come back with a vengeance though, returning to their winning ways and capturing Senior AA Championships in 1996, 1997, and 1998. Over the course of the last 10 seasons, the Thundercats won eight league championships.

2000's Logo

Finding themselves once again in the finals in 1999, they would suffer defeat at the hands of the upstart Milverton Four Wheel Drives.

Prior to the 1999–00 season, the Thundercats engaged in a two-game home-and-home series against the Ontario Hockey Association's Senior AAA Cambridge Hornets. On September 25, the Thundercats won 4–3 and the next day the Hornets won 2–1. Such a matchup between WOAA and OHA senior teams was not seen again until September 30, 2017, when the Clinton Radars defeated the Whitby Dunlops 3–2 in a preseason game.

Todd Stoddart became the coach in 2000. The team lost to Palmerston in the seventh game of the semi-finals. With Kevin Eccles as coach, the team defeated the Hensall Sherwoods for the Senior "AA" title in 2001 but lost to Milverton in 2002. Rob Reed became the coach for the 2002/03 season. The team had a regular season record of 22 wins and 2 losses, which equaled the 1989 record. The team did not win the championship following that regular season.

In 2003/04, the Thundercats, with Reed behind the bench again, would plough their way through the regular season and then carry-on to win another Senior "AA" championship, defeating the Clinton Radars in the league final. 2004/05 proved to be an interesting season. With the 2004–05 NHL lockout looming, the Thundercats openly allowed the Ottawa Senators Chris Neil to practice with the team. With the cancellation of the season, Neil joined his three older brothers and signed with the Thundercats. Unfortunately he signed without permission from the WOAA. In the only game he played, Neil recorded one assist in a 5–4 win over the Mildmay Monarchs. Asked about Neil playing against his team, Monarchs coach's mentioned that it was unfortunate they were unaware Neil was playing, or they would have promoted it better. Mildmay's feelings however were not universal and soon after, the WOAA announced that they would not allow actively professional players compete in the WOAA regardless of the NHL lockout. For playing Neil without league permission, the win was taken away and awarded to Mildmay and Durham's coach Rob Reed was suspended. Without the ability to play with his brothers, Neil soon shipped off to the American Hockey League's Binghamton Senators, and they T-Cats were unable to duplicate the success of the previous year.

The 2005–06 season saw a new team president in Randy Reay, and a new Coach, in John Antonopolis. Antonopolis was already well known in the area, having already been suspended by the OHA after some successes but also for questionable coaching practices. With Reed in the assistant coach's role, Antonopolis weaved his magic and once again the T-Cats were providing Durham fans with the kind of hockey they were used to seeing in the 1990s. After edging out the Elora Rocks for first place in the WOAA with 22 wins and 3 losses, the Thundercats plowed through the playoffs to defeat those same Rocks 4-games-to-1 to win another WOAA Senior "AA" championship.

The 2006–07 was a winning season for the Thundercats with 15 wins, 8 losses, and a tie, but the Thundercats fell victim to a new system in the WOAA that segregates Senior "AA" from Senior "A" before the playoffs, not during the opening round. The T-Cats finished just out of reach for the Senior "AA" loop, but proved worthy by going on to add another Senior "A" title to the long list of Championships.

In 2007–08, the Cats limped through the regular season, both on the ice and off. Antonopolis was unable to revive the magic from previous years even while the core of the T-Cats remained virtually unchanged. Ending up 6th during the regular season the Cats won the first round of play-offs but lost in A Semi-Finals.

2008–09 proved much the same as the previous year, ending up 5th during the regular and losing in the A Semi-Finals

2009–10, 5th, lost in A Finals

== Commemoration ==
In remembrance of two of the greatest teams in Durham hockey history, the 1989 Greater Ontario Senior "AA" champion Durham Huskies who made it to the Hardy Cup semi-finals will play off against the 1989 WOAA Intermediate Grand Champion Durham Thundercats on April 4, 2009, in a 20th Anniversary Alumni game.

== Season-by-season record ==
Note: GP = Games played, W = Wins, L = Losses, T = Ties, OTL = Overtime Losses Pts = Points, GF = Goals for, GA = Goals against

Season	GP	W	L	T	OTL	GF	GA	PTS	Finish	Playoffs
1972–73	Statistics Not Available									
1973–74	20	14	4	2	–	166	74	30	1st WOAA Int. C	
1974–75	Statistics Not Available									
1975–77	Hiatus – No Arena									
1977–83	Statistics Not Available									
1982–83	21	9	10	2	–	–	–	20	4th WOAA Int. A	Lost Int. A Final
1983–84	20	12	6	2	–	–	–	26	2nd WOAA Int. A	Lost Int. A Final
1984–85	20	6	13	1	–	–	–	13	6th WOAA Int. A	Lost Round Robin QF
1985–86	23	14	8	1	–	152	124	29	2nd WOAA North	Lost Int. C SF
1986–87	22	16	4	2	–	154	93	34	1st WOAA North	Int. A Champions
1987–88	16	6	6	4	–	108	98	16	4th WOAA North	Lost Int. A QF
1988–89	23	19	2	2	–	207	97	40	1st WOAA North	Int. A and Grand Champions
1989–90	21	11	4	6	–	162	116	28	3rd WOAA North	Lost Int. A SF
1990–91	23	20	2	1	–	156	84	41	1st WOAA North	Sr. A Champions
1991–92	25	20	3	2	–	206	110	42	1st WOAA North	Sr. A and Grand Champions
1992–93	24	18	2	4	–	–	–	40	1st WOAA Sr. A	Sr. A and Grand Champions
1993–94	20	14	3	3	–	–	–	31	2nd WOAA Sr. A	Sr. A and Grand Champions
1994–95	24	22	2	0	–	–	–	44	1st WOAA Sr. A	Lost final
1995–96	24	18	6	0	0	141	94	36	1st WOAA Sr. AA	"AA" Champions
1996–97	24	15	7	1	1	143	105	32	2nd WOAA Sr. AA	"AA" Champions
1997–98	26	19	4	3	0	182	98	41	1st WOAA Sr. AA	"AA" Champions
1998–99	24	18	4	2	0	139	78	38	2nd WOAA Sr. AA	Lost final
	25	17	5	2	1	–	–	37	2nd WOAA North	
2000–01	24	21	2	1	0	–	–	43	1st WOAA Sr	"AA" Champions
2001–02	24	21	1	1	1	179	79	44	1st WOAA Sr	Lost final
2002–03	24	22	2	0	0	209	66	44	1st WOAA Sr	
2003–04	24	18	4	2	0	162	69	38	2nd of 17 WOAA	Won Sr. AA Final (Radars)
2004–05	25	15	6	2	2	129	88	34	9th of 18 WOAA	
2005–06	25	22	3	–	0	171	76	44	1st of 18 WOAA	Won Preliminary, 3–0 (Jets); Won quarter-final, 4–1 (Radars); Won semi-final, 4–0 (Lancers); Won Sr. AA Final, 4–1 (Rocks)
2006–07	24	15	8	–	1	124	97	31	5th of 9 North Div. 8th of 18 WOAA	Won Sr. A QF, 4–2 (Wildcats); Won Sr. A SF, 4–1 (Bulls); Won Sr. A Final, 4–3 (Wolves)
2007–08	26	12	13	–	1	133	129	25	6th of 9 North; 12th of 19 WOAA	Won Sr. A QF, 4–2 (Pirates); Lost Sr. A SF, 1–4 (81's)
2008–09	20	14	6	–	0	117	85	28	5th of 11 North Div. 8th of 21 WOAA	Lost Sr. A Qualifier, 0–4 (81's); Won Sr. A QF, 4–0 (Icemen); Lost Sr. A SF, 2–4 (Lancers)
2009–10	20	11	8	–	1	101	107	23	T-4th of 10 North Div. T-7th of 19 WOAA	Lost North QF, 2–3 (Wolves); Won Sr. A QF, 4–3 (Crushers); Won Sr. A SF, 4–3 (Lancers); Lost Sr. A Final, 1–4 (Four Wheel Drives)
2010–11	26	11	12	–	3	107	143	25	7th of 10 North Div. 11th of 19 WOAA	Lost North QF, 0–4 (Rocks)
2011–12	24	15	5	–	4	113	102	34	4th of 9 North Div. 5th of 18 WOAA	Won North QF, 4–1 (81's); Lost North SF, 0–4 (Winterhawks)
2012–13	24	13	9	–	2	99	87	28	5th of 8 North Div. T-9th of 17 WOAA	Lost North QF, 1–4 (Wolves)
2013–14	24	9	10	–	5	90	111	23	5th of 8 North Div. 12th of 16 WOAA	Won North QF, 4–0 (Crushers); Lost North SF, 1–4 (81's)
2014–15	24	18	4	–	2	117	65	38	1st of 8 North Div. 1st of 14 WOAA	Lost North SF, 2–4 (Rocks)
2015–16	24	17	5	–	2	115	87	36	2nd of 8 North Div. 3rd of 14 WOAA	Lost North SF, 2–4 (Winterhawks)
2016–17	20	11	8	–	1	105	98	23	8th of 14 WOAA	Lost quarter-final, 1–4 (Winterhawks)
2017–18	20	16	4	–	0	115	57	32	3rd of 13 WOAA	Won quarter-final, 4–0 (Winterhawks); Won semi-final, 4–1 (Wolves); Lost final, 0–4 (Radars)
2018–19	22	14	5	–	3	145	99	31	3rd of 14 WOAA	Won quarter-final, 4–0 (Squires); Lost semi-final, 2–4 (Wolves)
2019–20	22	12	9	–	1	100	90	25	8th of 14 WOAA	Lost quarter-final, 3–4 (Wolves)
2020–21	Season cancelled due to COVID-19									
2021–22	15	9	6	–	0	53	47	18	4th of 13 WOAA	Lost quarter-final, 1–4 (Centenaires)
2022–23	20	10	9	–	1	72	71	21	8th of 12 WOAA	Lost quarter-final, 0–4 (Centenaires)
2023–24	20	12	7	–	1	83	73	25	5th of 11 OEHL	Lost quarter-final, 1–4 (Royals)
2024–25	20	8	12	–	0	87	100	16	9th of 11 OEHL	1st of 3 in Round Robin (2–2); Won Sr. A Final, 4–1 (Four Wheel Drives)

== List of championships ==
The 72's

- 1974–75 WOAA Intermediate "C" Champions
- 1978–79 WOAA Intermediate "B" Champions
- 1981–82 WOAA Intermediate "A" Champions
- 1986–87 WOAA Intermediate "A" Champions

Runner-Up in: Int. "C" 1972–73, Int. "B" 1980–81, Int. "A" 1982–83, 1983–84

The Thundercats

- 1988–89 WOAA Intermediate Grand-Champions
- 1990–91 WOAA Intermediate "A" Champions
- 1991–92 WOAA Senior Grand-Champions
- 1992–93 WOAA Senior Grand-Champions
- 1993–94 WOAA Senior Grand-Champions
- 1995–96 WOAA Senior "AA" Champions
- 1996–97 WOAA Senior "AA" Champions
- 1997–98 WOAA Senior "AA" Champions
- 2000–01 WOAA Senior "AA" Champions
- 2003–04 WOAA Senior "AA" Champions
- 2005–06 WOAA Senior "AA" Champions
- 2006–07 WOAA Senior "A" Champions
- 2024–25 OEHL Senior "A" Champions

Runner-Up in: Sr. "AA" 1994–95, 1998–99, 2001–02, Sr. "A" 2009–10

== Notable alumni ==
- Jeff MacMillan
- Derek Matheson
- Chris Neil

== Related links ==
- Durham, Ontario
- Durham Huskies
- Western Ontario Athletic Association
- WOAA Senior Hockey League
