= Walkerton Capitals =

- City: Walkerton, Ontario
- League: WOAA Senior Hockey League
- Division: North
- Operated: 2008-2012
- Home arena: Walkerton Community Centre
- Colours: Black, Red, White

The Walkerton Capitals were a senior hockey team based out of Walkerton, Ontario, Canada. The Capitals played in the Western Ontario Athletic Association Senior Hockey League for four seasons.

== 2008-09 ==
Walkerton began their inaugural season in the league on the road with a 6-3 loss to the Shelburne Muskies. The Capitals lost their next two games to fall to 0-3-0 before earning their first victory, a 4-2 win over the Nottawasaga River Rats. Walkerton would finish the season with a 4-14-2 record, earning 10 points, and ninth place in the WOAA North Division, failing to qualify for the "AA" playoffs.

The Capitals opened the "B" playoffs against the Shallow Lake Crushers, and it was the Crushers who struck first, winning the series opener 6-3. Walkerton continued to dig themselves in a hole, losing the second game 7-5, however, the Capitals played a strong game in the third game, defeating Shallow Lake 6-5 to earn their first ever playoff victory, and cut the Crushers series lead to 2-1. Shallow Lake took the fourth game, doubling Walkerton 4-2, pushing the Capitals on the brink of elimination. Walkerton fought off the Crushers in the fifth game, hanging on for a 3-2 win, however, Shallow Lake ended the series in the sixth game, defeating Walkerton 5-3, and ending the Capitals inaugural season.

== 2009-10 ==
Walkerton had another long regular season, as they finished the season with a 4-15-1 record, earning nine points and their second straight ninth-place finish in the WOAA North Division, failing to qualify for the "AA" playoffs.

The Capitals faced the Goderich Pirates and Drayton Icemen in a "B" round robin series, with each team playing each other twice. Walkerton opened the round robin against the Pirates, and lost a close contest by a 5-3 score. The Capitals then lost the next game against the Icemen 7-5 to fall to 0-2. Walkerton came out on the wrong end of a 9-5 score against Goderich in their third game, followed by a 3-2 loss to Drayton in the final game to finish the round robin with a 0-4 record, and was eliminated from the post-season.

== 2010-11 ==
Walkerton made some positive steps in the 2010-11 season, as they doubled their win total from the previous season, as the team went 8-17-1 to earn a club record 17 points. It wasn't enough for the team to clinch a spot in the "AA" playoffs, as they finished in ninth place in the North Division.

The Capitals faced off against the Clinton Radars and Drayton Icemen in the "B" semi-final round robin, with the top two teams advancing to the "B" finals. Walkerton clinched a berth in the finals after finishing the round-robin with a 2-2 record. In the best-of-five "B" finals, the Capitals played against the Radars for the championship. In the opening game held in Clinton, the Radars shutout Walkerton 5-0. The Capitals rebounded on home ice in game two, as they won 9-5 to even the series at 1-1. Walkerton then took a 2-1 series lead as the Capitals defeated the Radars 8-7 in overtime in game three. Looking to wrap up the series on home ice, Walkerton took care of business, earning their second consecutive overtime victory, this time by a 3-2 score, to defeat Clinton and win the "B" championship.

== 2011-12 ==
The Capitals regressed, with a dismal 2-20-2 record to finish 9th and last in the North Division. They were to face the Thedford Dirty Dogs in the "B" final, however, the two sides agreed to forgo the series.

== 2012-13 ==
The Capitals took a leave of absence with the intention of taking one year off. The club was to return for the 2013-14 season, however, they folded before the season.

== Season-by-season record ==
Note: GP = Games played, W = Wins, L = Losses, T= Tie, OTL = Overtime Losses, Pts = Points, GF = Goals for, GA = Goals against

Season	GP	W	L	OTL	GF	GA	PTS	Finish	Playoffs
2008-09	20	4	14	2	54	125	10	9th WOAA North	Lost "B" Semi-Finals, 2-4 (Crushers)
2009-10	20	4	15	1	73	134	9	9th WOAA North	Lost "B" SF Round Robin vs. Icemen & Pirates
2010-11	26	8	17	1	94	127	17	9th WOAA North	Won "A" SF Round Robin vs. Icemen & Radars; Won "A" Finals, 3-1 (Radars)
2011-12	24	2	20	2	67	156	6	9th WOAA North	DNQ

== Notable alumni ==
- Nathan Perrott

== Related links ==
- Walkerton, Ontario
- Western Ontario Athletic Association
- WOAA Senior Hockey League
