= Drayton Icemen =

Canadian hockey team

- City: Drayton, Ontario, Canada
- League: WOAA Senior Hockey League
- Division: North
- Operated: 2005-2011
- Home arena: PMD Drayton Arena
- Colours: Blue, Grey, and Maroon

Franchise history
- 2005-2011: Drayton Icemen
- 2011: merged into Mapleton-Minto 81's

The Drayton Icemen were a senior hockey team based out of Drayton, Ontario, Canada. They played six seasons in the WOAA Senior Hockey League.

== The Comets ==
Drayton previously had a WOAA Sr. Hockey Team, the Drayton Comets, who folded after the 1997-98 season. The Comets were Intermediate "C" Champions on two occasions, in 1989-90 and 1990–91, however they were unable to capture the WOAA Grand Championship.

== 2005–06 Icemen season ==
WOAA Sr. Hockey came back to Drayton for the 2005-06 season, as they were awarded an expansion team, which was named the Icemen. In 25 games, the Icemen finished in last place in the 18 team league, with a 1-24-0 record. They scored 60 goals, and allowed 223. Drayton then played the Mildmay Monarchs in a best of three qualifying round, with the winner going to participate in the WOAA playoffs, however the Icemen were eliminated in two games, thus ending their season.

== 2006–07 Icemen season ==
The Icemen had a bit more success in their second season, finishing with a 4-19-1 record, good for eighth place in the North Division, and sixteenth overall in the WOAA. The Icemen would then face the Georgian Bay River Rats in a best of three qualifying round, and the team won their first ever playoff series by sweeping the River Rats.

Drayton then faced the Milverton Four Wheel Drives in the "A" quarter finals, and in the first game were led by goaltender Ryan Cherrey as he made 66 saves in Drayton's 3-2 OT victory. Milverton stormed back and easily won the next two games, but Drayton evened the series up at two games with another surprising victory. The Icemen dropped game five by a 6-2 score, but put up a good fight in the sixth game before losing 3-2 in OT to be eliminated from the playoffs.

== 2007–08 Icemen season ==
Drayton would have another long season with wins few and far between, as they finished the season with a 3-22-1 record, finishing in eighth place in the nine team WOAA North Division.

The Icemen would face the Shallow Lake Crushers in a best of three qualifying series, with the winner advancing to the WOAA "A" playoffs. Drayton would fall behind in the first game, trailing 4-3 in the third period, before making a comeback, and win the game 5-4 to take a 1-0 series lead. The Crushers would even it up with a 4-2 win in the second game, setting up a third and deciding game. In another close game, the Icemen and Crushers were tied at the end of regulation time, sending the game into a sudden death overtime. Drayton's Courtney Wilson would score the series winning goal, lifting the Icemen to the "A" playoffs.

Drayton would face the Lucknow Lancers in a best of seven quarter final series, and the Icemen took a 1-0 series lead with very solid goaltending in the series opener, as Drayton won the game 2-1. The Icemen would drop the next game by a very close score of 3-2 as the series was evened up. The series moved to Drayton for the next two games, but it was Lucknow who won those games, taking a 3-1 series lead and putting the Icemen on the brink of elimination. Lucknow would finish the series in the fifth game, shutting out Drayton 10-0, eliminating the Icemen from the playoffs.

== 2008–09 Icemen season ==
The Icemen would see some improvement in their fourth season in the WOAA, as they would finish the regular season with a 7-13-0 record, earning 14 points, and once again finish in eighth in the North Division.

Drayton opened the playoffs with a best of seven series against the Saugeen Shores Winterhawks, with the winner advancing to the "AA" playoffs. The Winterhawks took the series lead by defeating the Icemen 9-3 in the series opener, followed by a 7-3 win in the second game. Drayton was never able to get themselves in the series, as Saugeen Shores won the third game 10-3, followed by another 7-3 win in the fourth game to send the Icemen to the "A" playoffs.

The Icemen would face the Durham Thundercats in the "A" quarter-finals, and would lose the series opener in heartbreaking fashion, as Durham defeated Drayton 7-6 in double overtime. Durham handled the Icemen easily in the second game, winning 6-2, followed by a blowout victory in the third game, defeating Drayton 8-2. The Icemen would go quietly in the fourth game, as the Thundercats crushed Drayton by a score of 9-3, completing the series sweep.

== 2009–10 Icemen season ==
Drayton would have a disappointing regular season, as they finished with the worst record in the league with a 3-15-2 record, earning eight points and a tenth-place finish in the North Division.

The Icemen participated in a round-robin series against the Goderich Pirates and Walkerton Capitals, with the top two teams facing off for the "B" championship. Drayton went 2-2 in their four games, losing twice to the Pirates, while defeating the Capitals twice, to earn a spot in the "B" finals. In the best of seven series, Goderich got off to a 2-0 series lead, winning both games at home by 4-3 scores. Drayton cut the Pirates series lead in half in the third game, as the Icemen held on for a 5-4 win, however, the Pirates defeated Drayton 9-7 in the fourth game to take a 3-1 series lead. The Pirates would finish off Drayton in the fifth game back on home ice, by a score of 4-3, to clinch the "B" championship.

== 2010–11 Icemen season ==
Drayton had another tough season, as the team finished with the worst record in the league for a second straight season, as the Icemen were 5-20-1, earning eleven points, and a tenth-place finish in the WOAA North standings.

In the post-season, the Icemen would face off against the Clinton Radars and Walkerton Capitals in a round-robin series. Drayton earned a record of 2-2, winning both games against the Capitals, while losing both to the Radars. In a tie-breaking game against Clinton, the Radars defeated the Icemen 6-5 in overtime, eliminating Drayton from the playoffs.

Following the season, the Icemen ceased operations by merging with Palmerston to form the Mapleton-Minto 81's.

== Season-by-season record ==
Note: GP = Games played, W = Wins, L = Losses, OTL = Overtime Losses, Pts = Points, GF = Goals for, GA = Goals against

Season	GP	W	L	OTL	GF	GA	PTS	Finish	Playoffs
2005-06	25	1	24	0	60	223	2	18th WOAA Sr	Lost Elimination Round, 0-2 (Monarchs)
2006-07	24	4	19	1	70	185	9	8th WOAA North	Won Elimination Round, 2-0 (River Rats); Lost "A" Quarterfinals, 2-4 (Four Wheel Drives)
2007-08	26	3	22	1	91	185	7	8th WOAA North	Won Elimination Round, 2-1 (Crushers); Lost "A" Quarterfinals, 0-4 (Lancers)
2008-09	20	7	13	0	101	138	14	8th WOAA North	Lost "A" Qualifying Round, 0-4 (Winterhawks)
2009-10	20	3	15	2	78	132	8	10th WOAA North	Won "B" SF Round-Robin vs. Pirates & Capitals; Lost "B" Final, 1-4 (Pirates)
2010-11	26	5	20	1	104	188	11	10th WOAA North	Lost "A" SF Round-Robin vs. Capitals & Radars

== Related links ==
- Drayton, Ontario
- Western Ontario Athletic Association
- WOAA Senior Hockey League
