= Ontario Elite Hockey League =

Canadian senior ice hockey league

- Membership: Ontario Hockey Association
- Commissioner: Rick Richardson
- Former names: list: WOAA Intermediate League (1948–1991); WOAA Senior Hockey League (1991–2010); WOAA Senior AA Hockey League (2010–2023)
- Founded: 2023 (as OEHL); 1948 (as WOAA)
- Recent champions: Minto 81's (AA, 3rd); Durham Thundercats (A, 2nd)
- Website: oehlhockey.ca

The Ontario Elite Hockey League is a Canadian senior ice hockey league governed by the Ontario Hockey Association and Hockey Canada. The league operates in Southwestern Ontario. As of the 2024–25 season, the champion of the OEHL will be eligible to challenge the champion of Allan Cup Hockey for a spot in the Canadian national Senior AAA championship and a chance to win the Allan Cup.

Formerly known as the WOAA Senior AA Hockey League, and governed by the autonomous Western Ontario Athletic Association, in the summer of 2023 ten of the twelve existing teams voted to leave the WOAA and reform under the umbrella of the Ontario Hockey Association.

== History ==
=== WOAA Intermediate League ===
From 1969 until 1977, the WOAA's premier division was an Intermediate B hockey league. Teams that were involved were the Mount Forest Rams, Arthur Tigers, Thornbury, Harriston Blues, Milverton Four Wheel Drives, Plattsville Combines, Seaforth, Durham 72's, Listowel, Lucknow, Crediton, Atwood, Ripley, Belgrave, and Kurtzville. The league was divided into as many as five divisions, Int. B, Major and Minor Int. C, and Major and Minor Int. D. The teams from the Major Int. C loop dominated the WOAA in terms of Grand Championships, winning 5 of 8. The most dominant teams were Mount Forest and Milverton.

From 1977 until 1991, the WOAA promoted itself to the Intermediate A level. With four major loops: A, B, C, and D; the WOAA had a wide variety of teams, including the Durham 72's, Arthur Tigers, Brussels Crusaders, Lion's Head Northstars, Woodford Royals, Ripley Roosters, Drayton Comets, St. Clements Saints, Teeswater Falcons, Lucknow Lancers, Kincardine Kings, Dundalk Flyers, Monkton Wildcats, Mitchell Red Devils, and Tara Cyclones. As the league grew, they brought in many smaller local senior leagues like the Central Ontario Hockey League, Central Grey-Bruce Hockey League and the Bruce Rural Hockey League, integrating many of their teams. In 1991, they came to grip with the times and dropped the Intermediate moniker, relabeling itself the WOAA Senior A Hockey League. In the 1980s, many teams jumped between the WOAA and the Ontario Hockey Association Senior leagues that attempted to operate in the area. This era ended in 1994 with the death of the WOAA Grand Championship. The final champions were the Durham Thundercats, who took it for the third straight year in 1994. From 1977 until 1994, the WOAA was dominated early on by Lion's Head and Woodford and later on by Brussels and Durham.

=== WOAA Senior AA ===
With the collapse of Ontario Hockey Association Senior hockey, the WOAA made the move to declare itself one level below Allan Cup competition with the Senior AA moniker in 1994. The league consolidated itself into one large league with different tiers of playoff championships: AA, A, and Sr. B until 1997. The Durham Thundercats proved to be the team to beat early on. Going back to the 1991–92 season, the Thundercats won 9 league championships in 15 years, including 6 out of 7 from the 1991–92 season until 1998. In 1995, the Tavistock Royals won the first ever WOAA Senior AA championship by taking the Durham Thundercats to seven games. The Thundercats avenged the loss by winning the next three Senior "AA" crowns. As time went on, the Milverton Four Wheel Drives reemerged as a powerhouse in the WOAA, dominating the league in 1999, 2000, and 2002. The Palmerston 81's and Elora Rocks also emerged as dominant forces later in the decade along with Tavistock as the Thundercats stranglehold on the league has loosened. The Saugeen Shores Winterhawks, based out of Port Elgin, have become the perennial team to beat since entering the league in 2007/08, winning the "AA" championship in 2009, 2011 and 2012.

In 2004, the WOAA allowed for the recreation of the famed Lucan-Ilderton Jets franchise, a team that dominated the Intermediate ranks in the 1960s and 1970s. The Jets, near London set a precedent for years to come. In 2006, the WOAA shocked many of its teams by confirming the expansion of the even more Southerly Thedford Dirty Dogs. In 2007, the WOAA turned down Eastern expansion to the Cooks Bay Canucks as that was not where the league was interested in going. In 2008, the Ontario Hockey Association was rocked by the defection of three of its five Major League Hockey Senior AAA teams. Two of them applied successfully for expansion into the WOAA, the Tillsonburg Vipers and the two-time Allan Cup champion Petrolia Squires. Also, the WOAA has made wind about further expansion to the South in former Senior AAA towns like Aylmer and Dorchester in the near future.

In the Summer of 2010, the WOAA decided to officially change the name of the league to the WOAA Senior AA Hockey League. Adding the "AA" designation was to help differentiate the league from Major League Hockey which carries a "AAA" designation. Also the league is to be divided into a Northern and Southern Conference with Northeast, Northwest, Southeast, and Southwest Divisions. The league as well wishes to promote expansion in the league, especially to the Southeast Division. Another change for 2010–11 is that there will only be one league championship for the first time in the league's modern history, as the league will drop both its second and third tier championships (Sr. A and Sr. B respectively). This was changed during the 2010–11 season, the Sr. A championship and qualifier round will still be gone but the Sr. B championship and its round robin will now be known as the Sr. A championship.

By 2017, the league had shrunk to 14 teams, with the departures of Walkerton, Thedford, Monkton and Komoka. With the South Division down to six teams (eight in the North), the league reverted to one division with each team playing an unbalanced schedule to reduce travel costs. The playoff format was revised, with the top-eight teams qualifying for the Sr. "AA" championship, while the remaining five teams played for the Sr. "A" championship. This change did nothing to stop the dynasty in Clinton, with the Radars rattling off four consecutive championships.

The 2020 playoffs were stopped in the semi-final round, and ultimately cancelled, by the COVID-19 pandemic, resulting in no champion being crowned for the first time in over 70 years. On September 25, 2020, the league announced the 2020–21 season was cancelled due to the COVID-19 pandemic.

The league returned for the 2021-22, with 13 teams in the fold. The Creemore Coyotes joined as an expansion team, while Elora and Tillsonburg withdrew. The Ripley Wolves were in first place with an 11-2-1 record on January 4, 2022 when the arrival of the omicron variant of COVID-19 caused restrictions to be re-imposed, shutting down the league. On January 12, 2022, the league announced the regular season had been declared complete and that the playoffs would begin upon resumption of play. Teams were ranked based on points-percentage due to the unequal number of games played.

=== Move to the OHA ===
In the summer of 2023 ten of the twelve existing teams voted to leave the league and reform under the umbrella of the Ontario Hockey Association. At the end of the 2022-23 WOAA Senior AA season, the Petrolia Squires elected to join the Western Ontario Super Hockey League, while Shallow Lake and Shelburne chose to take a year off.

With the move to the OHA, the league rebranded as the Ontario Elite Hockey League and added two new teams, the Georgian Bay Applekings and the Erin Outlaws. The league adopted the J.F. Paxton Cup as their AA playoff championship trophy, renaming it the OEHL Cup. The trophy was previously awarded to the OHA Senior A champion from 1935 until 1992, and briefly in 2004. Also, the Hugh McLean Trophy has been adopted as the OEHL's Senior A championship trophy. That trophy was previously awarded to the champions of the Continental Senior A Hockey League from 1973 until 1980 and then, later, the regular season champions of the OHA Senior A Hockey League from 1981 until 1987.

== 2026–27 OEHL teams ==
League Membership
Team	Centre	Founded
Creemore Coyotes	Creemore	2021
Delhi Flames	Delhi	2022
Dunnville Aeros	Dunnville	2023
Durham Thundercats	Durham	1972
Elmvale Harvesters	Elmvale	2025
Elora Rocks	Elora	
Erin Outlaws	Erin	2023
Lucknow Lancers	Lucknow	
Georgian Bay Applekings	Thornbury	2023
Milverton Four Wheel Drives	Milverton	1966
Minto 81's	Palmerston	1981
Petrolia Squires	Petrolia	c. 1960
Ridgetown Rebels	Ridgetown	2026
Ripley Wolves	Ripley	
Saugeen Shores Winterhawks	Port Elgin	2007
Seaforth Centenaires	Seaforth	2014
Shelburne Muskies	Shelburne	c. 1935
Tavistock Royals	Tavistock	1982
Tillsonburg Thunder	Tillsonburg	2001

== Map of teams ==
North division South division

== OEHL playoffs champions (since 2023) ==
Champions of the OEHL playoffs are awarded the J. F. Paxton Trophy.

OEHL Cup Senior AA
Year	Champions	Finalist	Series	Scores
2023–24	Minto 81's	Tavistock Royals	4–0	3–1, 6–5, 4–3 OT, 5–2
2024–25	Minto 81's	Ripley Wolves	4–0	4–2, 6–4, 5–3, 5–2
2025–26	Seaforth Centenaires	Ripley Wolves	4–2	3–0, 3–2, 3–4, 5-4 OT, 2–3 OT, 5–3
Hugh McLean Trophy Senior A
Year	Champions	Finalist	Series	Scores
2023–24	Georgian Bay Applekings	Milverton Four Wheel Drives	4–3	4–7, 9–3, 3–1, 2–6, 1–3, 5–2, 7–5
2024–25	Durham Thundercats	Milverton Four Wheel Drives	4–1	5–4, 5–4 OT, 13–5, 6–7 OT, 4–3 OT
2025–26	Saugeen Shores Winterhawks	Tillsonburg Thunder	4–0	10–2, 4–3 OT, 11-2, 9–6

== WOAA Championships (1948–2023) ==
=== WOAA Senior League Champions (1995–2023) ===
WOAA Senior AA
Year	Champion	Finalist	Series	Scores
1995	Tavistock Royals	Durham Thundercats	4-2	9-5, 7-4, 3-4 OT, 4-8, 8-3, 5-4
1996	Durham Thundercats	Lakeshore Winterhawks	4-0	6-2, 2-1, 6-1, 4-1
1997	Durham Thundercats	Wellesley Merchants	4-2	5-3, 3-7, 5-2, 7-4, 2-3, 6-4
1998	Durham Thundercats	Milverton Four Wheel Drives	4-0	5-0, 5-4, 7-5, 4-2
1999	Milverton Four Wheel Drives	Durham Thundercats	4-2	3-6, 5-8, 9-6, 3-2, 3-1, 5-2
Year	North Champion	South Champion	Series	Scores
2000	Palmerston 81's	Milverton Four Wheel Drives	0-4	3-2, 5-2, 5-1, 5-4
2001	Durham Thundercats	Hensall Sherwoods	4-3	2-4, 6-5, 4-8, 10-1, 5-1, 3-4 OT, 5-2
2002	Durham Thundercats	Milverton Four Wheel Drives	2-4	3-4, 3-5, 3-1, 4-3 OT, 3-2 OT, 5-1
Year	Champion	Finalist	Series	Scores
2003 Tier I	Palmerston 81's	Hensall Sherwoods	4-3	4-3, 3-4, 5-3, 1-4, 7-4, 3-4, 2-1
2003 Tier II	Shelburne Muskies	Tavistock Royals	3-0	7-4, 5-4, 8-5
2004	Durham Thundercats	Clinton Radars	4-1	3-2 OT, 4-1, 4-5, 5-3, 4-2
2005	Elora Rocks	Clinton Radars	4-0	3-2 OT, 6-4, 7-4, 5-3
2006	Durham Thundercats	Elora Rocks	4-1	6-2, 2-1, 3-5, 8-6, 5-2
Year	North Champion	South Champion	Series	Scores
2007	Elora Rocks	Tavistock Royals	4-3	6-3, 4-8, 6-5 OT, 6-8, 3-7, 5-3, 7-3
2008	Elora Rocks	Tavistock Royals	1-4	2-5, 5-4, 5-4, 4-3, 6-1
2009	Saugeen Shores Winterhawks	Tavistock Royals	4-1	4-3, 6-2, 5-4, 5-6 OT, 6-4
2010	Elora Rocks	Petrolia Squires	4-2	5-4, 1-5, 5-3, 0-5, 7-3, 3-2
2011	Saugeen Shores Winterhawks	Monkton Wildcats	4-1	5-3, 2-5, 5-2, 6-5, 4-2
2012	Saugeen Shores Winterhawks	Tavistock Royals	4-0	5-4, 3-2 OT, 5-3, 6-5 OT
2013	Saugeen Shores Winterhawks	Tavistock Royals	4-2	2-5, 6-5 OT, 6-5 OT, 1-5, 4-3 OT, 3-1
2014	Mapleton-Minto 81's	Komoka Classics	2-4	3-6, 2-4, 8-2, 5-2, 7-4, 5-4
2015	Mapleton-Minto 81's	Tillsonburg Thunder	1-4	6-3, 4-6, 4-1, 4-3, 5-1
2016	Mapleton-Minto 81's	Clinton Radars	0-4	5-3, 4-2, 4-1, 7-3
Year	Champion	Finalist	Series	Scores
2017	Clinton Radars	Petrolia Squires	4-2	1-2, 4-3 OT, 1-3, 7-3, 5-4 OT, 4-0
2018	Clinton Radars	Durham Thundercats	4-0	3-2, 6-4, 7-4, 4-3 OT
2019	Clinton Radars	Ripley Wolves	4-1	5-4 OT, 3-0, 2-7, 5-2, 4-0
2020 & 2021	Season cancelled due to COVID-19 pandemic			
2022	Seaforth Centenaires	Clinton Radars	4-1	1-0, 4-1, 5-1, 1-6, 2-1
2023	Tavistock Royals	Ripley Wolves	4-1	6-2, 4-3 OT, 4-6, 4-3 OT, 6-4
WOAA Senior A
Year	Champion	Finalist	Series	Scores
1995	Wiarton Redmen	Arthur Tigers	4-1	5-6, 9-6, 10-3, 7-4, 10-4
1996	Brussels Crusaders	Ripley Wolves	4-1	4-3, 8-3, 4-5, 6-3, 8-5
1997	Goderich Pirates	Ripley Wolves	4-3	4-7, 5-4, 8-4, 2-3 OT, 3-4 OT, 5-4, 3-2
1998	Shelburne Muskies	Clinton Radars	3-0	6-3, 7-6 2OT, 1-0 2OT
1999	Palmerston 81's	Clinton Radars	4-2	2-1, 6-5, 6-2, 5-6, 2-3, 3-0
2000	Monkton Wildcats	Elora Rocks	4-1	4-3, 1-4, 3-1, 6-4, 5-4
2001	Wingham Spitfires	Goderich Pirates	4-1	8-6, 4-2, 4-5, 4-2, 5-1
2002	Wingham Spitfires	Goderich Pirates	4-1	7-3, 3-4, 5-1, 5-4, 4-1
2003 Tier I	Wingham Spitfires	Georgian Bay River Rats	4-0	4-3 OT, 5-2, 7-2, 5-2
2003 Tier II	Listowel Jets	Goderich Pirates	2-1	2-5, 7-5, 7-4
2004	Georgian Bay River Rats	Monkton Wildcats	4-1	5-3, 4-1, 2-3 OT, 6-2, 5-4
2005	Lucan-Ilderton Jets	Lucknow Lancers	4-1	6-3, 4-3 OT, 7-1, 4-5, 3-0
2006	Palmerston 81's	Monkton Wildcats	4-0	7-1, 5-3, 4-2, 7-2
2007	Durham Thundercats	Ripley Wolves	4-3	5-4 OT, 3-4, 1-3, 8-6, 4-3, 4-8, 5-1
2008	Palmerston 81's	Lucknow Lancers	4-2	4-5, 6-4, 7-1, 5-7, 7-3, 3-2
2009	Lucan-Ilderton Jets	Lucknow Lancers	4-1	6-2, 8-4, 4-5, 4-3, 6-5
2010	Milverton Four Wheel Drives	Durham Thundercats	4-1	9-7, 5-6, 5-4, 8-3, 7-3
2011	Walkerton Capitals	Clinton Radars	3-1	0-5, 9-5, 8-7 OT, 3-2 OT
2012	Not played			
2013	Shallow Lake Crushers	Durham Thundercats	2-1	4-6, 3-2, 4-2
2014	Not played			
2015	Ripley Wolves	Shallow Lake Crushers	4-3	4-6, 6-2, 3-5, 4-6, 3-2 OT, 7-1, 5-0
2016	Tillsonburg Thunder	Ripley Wolves	4-1	7-1, 3-6, 2-1 OT, 7-4, 4-3
2017	Milverton Four Wheel Drives	Huron East Centenaires	4-3	3-8, 8-9 OT, 5-3, 2-3, 6-5 OT, 5-1, 10-5
2018	Petrolia Squires	Tavistock Royals	4-1	6-3, 2-3, 6-3, 4-3 OT, 3-2 OT
2019	Milverton Four Wheel Drives	Elora Rocks	4-2	3-4 OT, 3-2 OT, 4-6, 6-2, 3-1, 7-1
2020 & 2021	Cancelled due to COVID-19 pandemic			
2022	Shallow Lake Crushers	Petrolia Squires	4-2	2-4, 4-3 OT, 8-3, 8-3, 2-3, 4-1
2023	Milverton Four Wheel Drives	Shallow Lake Crushers	4-2	5-2, 2-5, 5-1, 7-9, 3-2 OT, 5-4 OT
WOAA Senior B
Year	Champion	Finalist	Series	Scores
1995	Ripley Wolves	Dundalk Flyers	4-0	8-1, 6-5, 5-2, 7-3
1996	Dundalk Flyers	Lucknow Lancers	4-0	4-2, 6-4, 5-4 OT, 5-2
1997	Lucknow Lancers	Dundalk Flyers	4-1	3-4, 3-1, 5-4, 7-4, 5-2
2009	Milverton Four Wheel Drives	Shallow Lake Crushers	4-2	7-3, 6-7 OT, 4-3, 7-2, 1-2, 6-3
2010	Goderich Pirates	Drayton Icemen	4-1	4-3, 4-3 OT, 4-5, 9-7, 4-3

=== Grand Championship Intermediate/Senior Era (1948–1994) ===
WOAA Intermediate 1948-1991
Year	Championship	Champion	Finalist	Series	Scores
1949	Grand Champion	Kincardine Kings	Linwood		
1950	Grand Champion	Wingham Spitfires	Lucknow Lancers		
1951	Grand Champion	Wingham Spitfires	Mildmay Monarchs		
1952	Grand Champion	Durham Huskies	Mildmay Monarchs		
1953	Grand Champion	Durham Huskies	Seaforth Beavers		
1954	Grand Champion	Goderich Pontiacs	St. Clements Saints		
1955	Grand Champion	Lucan Irish Six	Ilderton Jets		
1956	Grand Champion	Exeter Mohawks	Goderich Pontiacs		
1957	Grand Champion				
1958	Grand Champion	Palmerston Lions	Clinton Radars		
1959	Grand Champion				
1960	Grand Champion	Philipsburg Chews			
1961	Grand Champion	Philipsburg Chews			
1962	Grand Champion	Fergus Flyers	Paisley		
1963	Grand Champion				
1964	Grand Champion				
1965	Grand Champion				
1966	Grand Champion				
1967	Grand Champion				
1968	Grand Champion	Crediton Tigers	Milverton 4-Wheel Drives		
1969	Grand Champion	Crediton Tigers	Zurich		
1970	Grand Champion	Seaforth Beavers	Atwood		
1970	Major C	Atwood	Zurich		
1970	Minor C	Lucknow Lancers	Atwood		
1970	D	Belgrave Stone School	Dashwood		
1971	Grand Champion	Milverton 4-Wheel Drives	Atwood		
1971	B	Listowel Cyclones	Wingham Spitfires		
1971	Major C	Milverton 4-Wheel Drives	Harriston Intermediates		
1971	Minor C	Atwood	Monkton Wildcats		
1971	D	Kurtzville	Belgrave		
1972	Grand Champion	Milverton 4-Wheel Drives	Arthur Tigers		
1972	B	Milverton 4-Wheel Drives	Listowel Cyclones		
1972	Major C	Arthur Tigers	Port Elgin		
1972	Minor C	Lucknow Lancers	Atwood		
1972	D	Kurtzville	Belgrave		
1973	Grand Champion	Milverton 4-Wheel Drives	Atwood		
1973	B	Harriston Intermediates	Listowel Cyclones		
1973	Major C	Milverton 4-Wheel Drives	Durham 72's		
1973	Minor C	Atwood	Lucknow Lancers		
1973	D	Belgrave	Kurtzville		
1974	Grand Champion	Harriston Intermediates	Lucknow Lancers		
1974	B	Harriston Intermediates	Listowel Cyclones		
1974	Major C	Milverton 4-Wheel Drives	Arthur Tigers		
1974	Minor C	Lucknow Lancers	Atwood		
1974	D	Belgrave	Chatsworth		
1975	Grand Champion	Plattsville Combines	Arthur Tigers		
1975	B	Arthur Tigers	Walkerton Capitols		
1975	C	Durham 72's	St. Clements Saints		
1975	Major D	Plattsville Combines	Atwood		
1975	Minor D	Floradale	Belgrave		
1976	Grand Champion	Mount Forest Rams	Plattsville Combines		
1976	C	Mount Forest Rams	Wiarton Redmen		
1976	Major D	Plattsville Combines	Howick		
1976	Minor D	Belgrave			
1977	Grand Champion	Mount Forest Rams	Thornbury		
1977	B	Thornbury	Hanover		
1977	Major C	Mount Forest Rams	Lion's Head North Stars		
1977	Minor C	Plattsville Combines	Monkton Wildcats		
1977	D	Ripley Roosters	Belgrave		
1978	Grand Champion	Mount Forest Rams	Drayton Comets		
1978	B	Thornbury	Hanover		
1978	C	Mount Forest Rams	Mitchell Red Devils		
1978	D	Drayton Comets	Ripley Roosters		
1978	Cons. B	Palmerston Lions	Mitchell Red Devils		
1978	Cons. D	Brussels Crusaders	Monkton Wildcats		
1978	Central Grey-Bruce	Chesley	Port Elgin		
1978	Bruce Rural	Chepstow	Mildmay Monarchs		
1979	Grand Champion	Lion's Head North Stars	Durham 72's		
1979	B	Durham 72's	Palmerston Lions		
1979	C	Lion's Head North Stars	Mitchell Red Devils		
1979	D	Ripley Roosters	Brussels Crusaders		
1979	Cons. D	Monkton Wildcats	Drayton Comets		
1980	Grand Champion	Lion's Head North Stars	Brussels Crusaders		
1980	B	Wiarton Redmen	Palmerston Lions		
1980	C	Mitchell Red Devils / Lion's Head North Stars		Co-Champions	
1980	D	Drayton Comets	Monkton Wildcats		
1980	Central Grey-Bruce	Desboro	Shallow Lake		
1980	COHL	Dundalk Flyers	Markdale Majors		
1981	Grand Champion	Mitchell Red Devils	Ripley Roosters		
1981	A	Southampton	Desboro		
1981	B	Mitchell Red Devils	Durham 72's		
1981	C	Lion's Head North Stars	Chesley		
1981	D	Ripley Roosters	Markdale Majors		
1981	Central Grey-Bruce	Williamsford	Desboro		
1981	COHL	Honeywood Cougars	Markdale Majors		
1982	Grand Champion	Ripley Roosters	Durham 72's		
1982	A	Durham 72's	Woodford Royals		
1982	D	Ripley Roosters	Teeswater Falcons		
1982	Central Grey-Bruce	Tara B.P. Eagles	Keady		
1982	COHL	Markdale Majors	Hillsburgh		
1983	Grand Champion	Lion's Head North Stars	Woodford Royals		
1983	A	Woodford Royals	Durham 72's	4-3	2-4, 6-7, 7-8, 9-8, 5-4 OT, 8-3, 6-5
1983	D	Lion's Head North Stars	Ripley Roosters		
1984	Grand Champion	Ripley Roosters	Wingham Royals	4-2	
1984	A	Wingham Royals	Durham 72's		
1984	D	Ripley Roosters	Teeswater Falcons		
1985	Grand Champion	Woodford Royals	Ripley Roosters	4-0	12-2, 7-6, 12-3, 10-5
1985	A	Woodford Royals	Exeter Mohawks	4-2	4-3, 5-7, 4-2, 7-4, 3-5, 4-2
1985	D	Ripley Roosters	Lucknow Lancers	4-1	5-6, 7-6 OT, 8-2, 5-4, 6-2
1986	Grand Champion	Woodford Royals	Kincardine Kings	4-1	1-7, 12-7, 12-5, 6-2, 10-4
1986	A	Woodford Royals	Tara Cyclones	4-0	13-4, 15-9, 12-2, 6-2
1986	B	Kincardine Kings	Teeswater Falcons	4-0	8-7, 8-3, 5-4, 6-2
1986	C	Lion's Head North Stars	Milverton 4-Wheel Drives	3-0	8-7, 5-3, 9-6
1986	D	Ripley Roosters	Mildmay Monarchs	4-1	6-5, 8-7, 4-5, 4-2, 6-4
1987	Grand Champion	Lion's Head North Stars	Ripley Roosters	4-1	8-11, 9-1, 7-4, 11-5, 8-6
1987	A	Durham 72's	Teeswater Falcons	4-0	7-2, 5-4, 7-5, 7-2
1987	B	Wellesley Merchants	Brussels Crusaders	4-1*	7-6, 4-9, ~~4-10~~, ~~0-4~~, 7-1, 4-3 OT, 5-3; Two Brussels wins overturned.
1987	C	Lion's Head North Stars	Monkton Wildcats	3-0	6-3, 5-4 OT, 5-4 OT
1987	D	Ripley Roosters	Drayton Comets	4-1	2-1, 10-4, 12-3, 6-7, 7-4
1988	Grand Champion	Brussels Crusaders	Lion's Head North Stars	3-2	3-5, 6-4, 3-0 Forfeit, 4-5, 4-3
1988	A	Brussels Crusaders	Kincardine Kings	4-3	3-4 OT, 4-7, 8-2, 4-3, 5-4, 4-5 OT, 8-7
1988	B	Monkton Wildcats	Arthur Tigers	4-0	7-2, 6-3, 4-2, 7-2
1988	C	Lion's Head North Stars	St. Clements Saints	3-0	3-1, 6-3, 3-0 Forfeit
1988	D	Ripley Roosters	Lucknow Lancers	4-2	2-6, 4-6, 8-4, 6-3, 6-5 2OT, 9-4
1989	Grand Champion	Durham Thundercats	Lucknow Lancers	3-0	11-4, 6-4, 10-3
1989	A	Durham Thundercats	Kincardine Kings	3-0	8-3, 8-7, 10-5
1989	B	Brussels Crusaders	Arthur Tigers	3-0	16-7, 13-2, 17-7
1989	C	Lion's Head North Stars	Uncontested		
1989	D	Lucknow Lancers	Milverton 4-Wheel Drives	3-2	4-9, 4-9, 5-4, 9-6, 6-4
1990	Grand Champion	Brussels Crusaders	Drayton Comets	3-1	6-8, 7-2, 6-2, 6-1
1990	A	Brussels Crusaders	Kincardine Kings	3-1	5-4, 7-5, 4-8, 9-6
1990	B	Arthur Tigers	Dundalk Flyers	4-0	6-4, 7-2, 8-4, 11-2
1990	C	Drayton Comets	Ripley Wolves	3-2	2-4, 3-6, 6-3, 5-2, 4-3
1991	Grand Champion	Arthur Tigers	Durham Thundercats	3-2	2-8, 8-1, 3-4, 8-1, 6-5
1991	A	Durham Thundercats	Tavistock Royals	3-1	6-3, 2-1 OT, 4-8, 5-3
1991	B	Arthur Tigers	Wiarton Redmen	3-0	9-8, 8-4, 9-3
1991	C	Drayton Comets	Ripley Wolves	3-1	5-3, 11-3, 5-6, 7-3
WOAA Senior League 1991–1994
Year	Championship	Champion	Finalist	Series	Scores
1992	Grand Champion	Durham Thundercats	Uncontested		
1992	A	Durham Thundercats	Tavistock Royals	4-0	7-5, 5-4, 10-6, 8-3
1992	B	Lion's Head North Stars	Lucknow Lancers	3-0	5-4, 6-1, 9-5
1993	Grand Champion	Durham Thundercats	Uncontested		
1993	A	Durham Thundercats	Tavistock Royals	4-2	5-3, 5-4, 7-5, 6-7 OT, 6-7 OT, 5-4 OT
1993	B	Grand Valley Tornados	Dundalk Flyers	4-1	9-12, 4-1, 6-1, 5-3, 6-2
1994	Grand Champion	Durham Thundercats	Ripley Wolves	3-0	6-3, 7-6 OT, 3-0
1994	A	Durham Thundercats	Lakeshore Winterhawks	4-2	4-3 OT, 7-3, 3-5, 5-6, 7-5, 4-3
1994	B	Ripley Wolves	Grand Valley Tornados	4-0	6-3, 6-2, 4-0, 10-2

== Past WOAA teams ==
- Arthur Tigers
- Brussels Crusaders
- Clinton Radars
- Dundalk Flyers
- Durham Huskies
- Drayton Comets
- Drayton Icemen
- Exeter Mohawks
- Goderich Pirates
- Grand Valley Tornados
- Kincardine Kings
- Komoka Classics
- Lakeshore Winterhawks
- Lion's Head Northstars
- Listowel Jets
- Lucan-Ilderton Jets
- Mildmay Monarchs
- Mitchell Red Devils
- Monkton Wildcats
- Mount Forest Rams
- Nottawasaga River Rats
- Palmerston 81's
- Petrolia Squires
- Shallow Lake Crushers
- Thedford Dirty Dogs
- Walkerton Capitals
- Wellesley Merchants
- Wiarton Redmen
- Wingham Bulls
- Woodford Royals

== See also ==
- Western Ontario Athletic Association
- Central Ontario Hockey League
