= Milverton Four Wheel Drives =

- City: Milverton, Ontario
- League: Ontario Elite Hockey League
- Division: South
- Founded: 1966
- Home arena: Perth East Recreation Complex
- General manager: Jackson Blowes
- Head coach: Mike Carter; Tyler Parker
- Website: driveshockey.ca

The Milverton Four Wheel Drives are a senior hockey team based in Milverton, Ontario, Canada. They play in the Ontario Elite Hockey League of the Ontario Hockey Association and Hockey Canada.

== History ==
From 1974 until 1976, the Four Wheel Drives left the WOAA and played in the Ontario Hockey Association's Intermediate C Hockey League. They returned soon after.

== Championships ==
The Four Wheel Drives were a highly successful team in the 1970s, as they won the WOAA Grand Championship three years in a row, from 1971 to 1973. In recent years, Milverton has captured the "AA" championship three times, in 1999, 2000 and 2002. The Four Wheel Drives also captured the "B" championship in 2009.

== 2006–07 Four Wheel Drives season ==
Milverton finished the season with a 12-10-2 record, which was good for a fifth-place finish in the South Division, as the Drives failed to qualify for the Senior "AA" playoffs. In their last game of the season, they faced the Hensall Sherwoods, they were tied with in the standings, with the winner qualifying for the "AA" playoffs, and the loser to play in the "A" playoffs, and Milverton came up short, losing 5–4 to the Sherwoods.

The Four Wheel Drives opened the playoffs with a quarter-final series against the Drayton Icemen and were heavily favoured to sweep the series. Drayton stunned Milverton with a 3-2 OT victory in the first game before Milverton rebounded with two blowout victories. Drayton would then come back and win the fourth game to even up the series at two games. Milverton returned to win game five easily, and then would put away the Icemen in a game six overtime to win the series.

Milverton then faced the Ripley Wolves in the semi-finals. After dropping the first game in overtime, the Drives would win three in a row to take a 3–1 series lead, putting Ripley on the brink of elimination. The Wolves responded with a couple of two goal victories, forcing a seventh game to be played in Ripley. Ripley would complete the comeback with a 4–2 win in game seven, eliminating the Four Wheel Drives from the playoffs.

== 2007–08 Four Wheel Drives season ==
The Four Wheel Drives would finish with a 13-13-0 record, earning 26 points, the same point total from the previous season, despite playing two extra games. Milverton finished in sixth place in the South Division, and qualified for the "A" playoffs.

The Drives opened the playoffs against the Georgian Bay River Rats in a best of seven quarter final series, and Milverton set the tone of the series, winning the opening game 13–2. The second game of the series was a little closer, but still a blowout, as the Four Wheel Drives defeated the River Rats 9–3. The series moved to Georgian Bay for the next two games, and Milverton would easily sweep the Rats with back to back 10-4 victories, advancing to the semi-finals.

Milverton's next opponent was the Lucknow Lancers, and the Drives took an early series lead, defeating Lucknow 3–2 in the series opener. Lucknow responded with a game two victory, but Milverton once again took the series lead with a 5–4 win in the third game. The Lancers would again tie the series in game four, then Lucknow would take control of the series with a comeback victory in the fifth game to put the Drives on the brink of elimination. Milverton fought back in the sixth game, winning 9–6, setting up a seventh and deciding game. Lucknow would emerge victorious, hanging on for a 5–4 win, to eliminate the Four Wheel Drives from the playoffs.

== 2008–09 Four Wheel Drives season ==
The Four Wheel Drives started the season losing nine games in a row, quickly falling out of the "AA" playoff race, before finally defeating the Thedford Dirty Dogs. Milverton finished the season with a 4-16-0 record, earning eight points, and finishing in ninth place in the WOAA South Division.

The Drives qualified for the "B" playoffs, and would open against the Thedford Dirty Dogs in the best of seven semi-finals. Milverton would hold off Thedford in the series opener and win the game by a 5–4 score to take the series lead. The Four Wheel Drives would come from behind in the second game, as Thedford led 3-2 going into the third period, however, Milverton scored to tie the game and send it into overtime, where the Drives would complete the comeback and win the game 4–3 to take a 2–0 series lead. Milverton would have no problems in the third game, crushing the Dirty Dogs 8–2 to take a commanding 3–0 series lead. In the fourth game, the Four Wheel Drives would have to try to come back from behind, as Thedford held a 2–1 lead after two periods. Milverton would complete the comeback, scoring twice in the final period, to win the game 3–2, and sweep the series.

Milverton would face the Shallow Lake Crushers for the "B" championship, and the Four Wheel Drives opened the series with a solid 7–3 victory. The Crushers fought back in the second game, defeating the Drives 7–6 in overtime to even the series up. Milverton responded with a close 4–3 win in the third game, followed with a 7-2 blowout victory in the fourth game to take a 3–1 series lead. Facing elimination, the Crushers played a solid fifth game, defeating the Drives 2–1. Milverton proved to be too much for Shallow Lake to handle in the sixth game, as they cruised to a 6–3 victory, capturing the "B" championship.

== Season-by-season record ==
Note: GP = Games played, W = Wins, L = Losses, T= Tie, OTL = Overtime Losses, Pts = Points, GF = Goals for, GA = Goals against

| Season | GP | W | L | T | OTL | GF | GA | PTS | Finish | Playoffs |
|---|---|---|---|---|---|---|---|---|---|---|
| 1999-00 | 24 | 19 | 4 | 1 | 0 | -- | -- | 39 | 1st WOAA Sr | "AA" Champs |
| 2000-01 | 24 | 19 | 3 | 2 | 0 | -- | -- | 40 | 2nd WOAA Sr | |
| 2001-02 | 24 | 20 | 2 | 2 | 0 | 164 | 44 | 42 | 2nd WOAA Sr | "AA" Champs |
| 2002-03 | 25 | 15 | 9 | 0 | 1 | 123 | 79 | 31 | 7th WOAA Sr | |
| 2003-04 | 24 | 17 | 6 | 1 | 0 | 125 | 68 | 35 | 5th WOAA Sr | |
| 2004-05 | 25 | 17 | 7 | 1 | 0 | 128 | 90 | 35 | 7th WOAA Sr | |
| 2005-06 | 25 | 15 | 9 | - | 1 | 121 | 102 | 31 | 10th WOAA Sr | Lost "A" SF |
| 2006-07 | 24 | 12 | 10 | - | 2 | 130 | 113 | 26 | 5th WOAA South | Lost "A" SF |
| 2007-08 | 26 | 13 | 13 | - | 0 | 127 | 123 | 26 | 6th WOAA South | Lost "A" SF |
| 2008-09 | 20 | 4 | 16 | - | 0 | 66 | 121 | 8 | 9th WOAA South | "B" Champs |
| 2009-10 | 20 | 7 | 11 | - | 2 | 79 | 100 | 16 | 7th WOAA South | "A" Champs |
| 2010-11 | 26 | 9 | 14 | - | 3 | 116 | 127 | 21 | 6th WOAA South | |
| 2011-12 | 24 | 11 | 11 | - | 2 | 123 | 124 | 24 | 6th WOAA South | |
| 2012-13 | 24 | 11 | 12 | - | 1 | 103 | 105 | 23 | 6th WOAA South | |
| 2013-14 | 24 | 10 | 11 | - | 3 | 88 | 115 | 23 | 7th WOAA South | Lost Div. Quarter-final |

More information will be added as more becomes available

== See also ==
- Milverton, Ontario
- Western Ontario Athletic Association
- WOAA Senior Hockey League
