= Western Ontario Athletic Association =

The Western Ontario Athletic Association Crest

The Western Ontario Athletic Association (WOAA) is the governing body of minor and senior sports in a region encompassing Grey County, Bruce County, Perth County, Huron County, northern Middlesex County, and northern Wellington County. The WOAA Senior Hockey League has been around since 1948.

== Sports ==
The WOAA controls these sports: Senior Hockey, Women's Hockey, Minor Hockey, and Softball. The WOAA also actively trains officials for these sports. The WOAA's jurisdiction over local Senior Hockey has lasted since the 1948-1949 season but the association was actually established in 1942 by W. T. (Doc) Cruickshank of Wingham, Ontario. The WOAA became an incorporated body on July 24, 1986 under the Ontario Corporations Act.

In 2004, there were 545 sports teams with approximately 9881 registered participants and an addition approximate 2500 volunteers, executives, convenors and officials involved with the WOAA.

== Minor hockey towns ==
These are the major member towns as agreed to by the Ontario Minor Hockey Association and the Ontario Hockey Federation in 2006. These centres are governed by the WOAA, but the WOAA works under the OMHA. The WOAA is responsible for its own tournaments, disciplinary system, and playoffs, but must provide the accounts of these actions to the OMHA.

- BCHA (Bayfield, Clinton, and Hensall, Ontario)
- Belmore
- Blyth
- Brussels
- Chatsworth
- Chesley
- Clifford
- Drayton
- Durham
- Elma-Logan
- Goderich
- Hanover
- Howick
- Kincardine
- Lion's Head
- Listowel
- Lucknow
- Milverton
- Minto (Harriston, Palmerston)
- Mitchell
- Monkton, Ontario
- Mount Forest
- Normanby (Ayton)
- Paisley
- Ripley
- Seaforth
- Shallow Lake
- Saugeen Shores (Port Elgin, Southampton)
- South Bruce (Mildmay, Teeswater)
- Tara
- Tiverton
- Walkerton
- Wallace
- Wiarton
- Wingham
- Zurich

== See also ==
- WOAA Senior Hockey League
- Tubby Schmalz, vice-president of the WOAA from 1940 to 1950
