= Lucknow, Ontario =

Lucknow
- Community
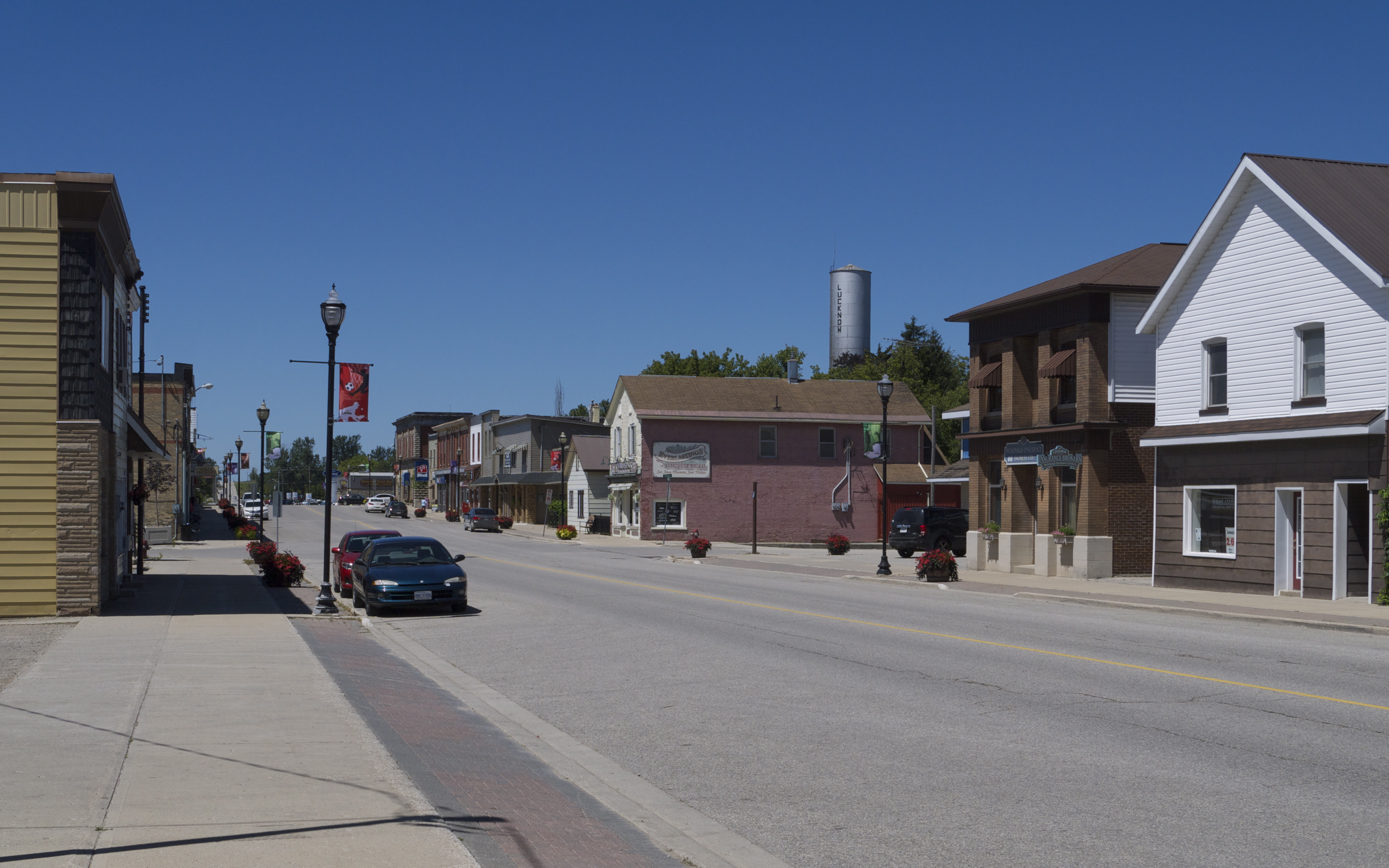
- Campbell Street (Bruce Road 86), the main thoroughfare of the town

- Location in southern Ontario
- Coordinates: 43.961°N 81.513°W
- Country: Canada
- Province: Ontario
- County: Bruce County
- Township: Huron-Kinloss
- Named for: Lucknow, India

Area
  - Land: 1.65 km^{2} (0.64 sq mi)

Population (2016)
  - Total: 1,121
  - Density: 679/km^{2} (1,760/sq mi)
- Time zone: UTC-5 (EST)
  - Summer (DST): UTC-4 (EDT)
- Area codes: 519, 226, 548

Lucknow is a community located in Bruce County, Ontario, Canada. It is incorporated in the Township of Huron-Kinloss.

== History ==
Lucknow boasts a strong Scottish heritage that reaches back to the late 1800s where the Lucknow Caledonian Games boomed for about 20 years. Lucknow's welcome sign honours Donald Dinnie a folk hero of Lucknow. This champion wrestler and heavyweight athlete of the world competed in the Games in Lucknow in 1882. Although he had no ties with the community he remains part of the lore.

The village was named after Lucknow, Uttar Pradesh, India where the Indian Rebellion of 1857 took place between Indian freedom fighters and the East India Company army. Lucknow takes the name of "Sepoy" which refers to the Indian foot soldiers who fought on the British side in the Relief of Lucknow. There are two theories about the origin of the name of Campbell Street-one is that the main street was named after Sir Colin Campbell, leader of the relief forces. The other is that the street is named after Malcolm Campbell, the community's first merchant. Several Lucknow streets bear the names of some of the British generals involved in the Relief of Lucknow: Campbell, Ross, Outram, Havelock, Willoughby, Rose and Canning.

Eli Stauffer first settled the unnamed land that was to become Lucknow in 1856 where he constructed a dam and built a sawmill. In 1858, Ralph Miller purchased a parcel of Stauffer's land and built "Balaclava House", a log tavern. James Somerville purchased the Stauffer mill and land rights in 1858 and had village lots surveyed, earning Somerville the title of the "Father of Lucknow". With the "Gravel Road" open into Kinloss in 1866, the village continued to grow and had a population of 430 in 1868.

== Events ==
Lucknow hosts an annual Strawberry Summerfest on the fourth weekend of June. The event includes a youth soccer tournament, male and female slow-pitch tournament, beer tent, vendors market, street entertainment on Saturday and two dances. Past performers at the dances include The Trews, Trooper, Thornley and Kim Mitchell.

Music In The Fields is an annual three-day country music festival hosted by the Lucknow Kinsmen and local volunteers. The event is 100% charitable, and has raised money for projects such as a new ice resurfacer for the local arena, and new tennis courts. It has also raised over $100,000 for cystic fibrosis (the Kinsmen's national charity) as well as over 1 million dollars for charity. The event runs the last weekend in August and takes place at the Lucknow Kinsmen Graceland Property. Music In The Fields (MITF) draws a crowd of approximately 8,000 guests and has hosted such acts as Blake Shelton, Dierks Bentley, the Band Perry, Big & Rich, Travis Tritt, Paul Brandt, Emerson Drive, Lonestar, Johnny Reid, George Canyon, Tim Hicks, Road Hammers & Jo Dee Messina.

== Media ==
The local newspaper is the Lucknow Sentinel.

- Cable television is provided by Rogers TV and HuronTel
- CKNX-FM 101.7 "The One" - local, regional and national news and adult contemporary music
- CIBU-FM 94.5 "The Bull" - local, regional and national news and classic rock music
- CKNX (AM) 920 - country music
- CHWC-FM 104.9 - country music broadcasting from Goderich, Ontario

== Climate ==
Climate data for Lucknow (1981–2010)
| Month | Jan | Feb | Mar | Apr | May | Jun | Jul | Aug | Sep | Oct | Nov | Dec | Year |
|---|---|---|---|---|---|---|---|---|---|---|---|---|---|
| Record high °C (°F) | 17.8 (64.0) | 14.4 (57.9) | 25.6 (78.1) | 30.0 (86.0) | 33.3 (91.9) | 36.7 (98.1) | 38.3 (100.9) | 37.2 (99.0) | 36.1 (97.0) | 32.2 (90.0) | 23.3 (73.9) | 18.3 (64.9) | 38.3 (100.9) |
| Mean daily maximum °C (°F) | −2.6 (27.3) | −1.5 (29.3) | 3.2 (37.8) | 11.7 (53.1) | 18.8 (65.8) | 22.9 (73.2) | 25.8 (78.4) | 24.3 (75.7) | 19.9 (67.8) | 13.0 (55.4) | 6.1 (43.0) | 0.1 (32.2) | 11.8 (53.2) |
| Daily mean °C (°F) | −6.4 (20.5) | −5.7 (21.7) | −1.6 (29.1) | 6.4 (43.5) | 12.5 (54.5) | 16.7 (62.1) | 19.6 (67.3) | 18.7 (65.7) | 14.6 (58.3) | 8.3 (46.9) | 2.6 (36.7) | −3.2 (26.2) | 6.9 (44.4) |
| Mean daily minimum °C (°F) | −10.1 (13.8) | −9.8 (14.4) | −6.4 (20.5) | 1.0 (33.8) | 6.1 (43.0) | 10.4 (50.7) | 13.4 (56.1) | 13.0 (55.4) | 9.2 (48.6) | 3.6 (38.5) | −0.9 (30.4) | −6.4 (20.5) | 1.9 (35.4) |
| Record low °C (°F) | −35.0 (−31.0) | −36.7 (−34.1) | −31.7 (−25.1) | −24.4 (−11.9) | −7.8 (18.0) | −3.3 (26.1) | 0.0 (32.0) | 0.0 (32.0) | −5.0 (23.0) | −12.2 (10.0) | −22.8 (−9.0) | −30.6 (−23.1) | −36.7 (−34.1) |
| Average precipitation mm (inches) | 109.6 (4.31) | 81.5 (3.21) | 70.5 (2.78) | 81.7 (3.22) | 86.5 (3.41) | 87.5 (3.44) | 66.0 (2.60) | 109.1 (4.30) | 132.1 (5.20) | 106.3 (4.19) | 112.4 (4.43) | 117.9 (4.64) | 1,161 (45.71) |
| Average rainfall mm (inches) | 13.9 (0.55) | 14.6 (0.57) | 37.5 (1.48) | 71.1 (2.80) | 86.3 (3.40) | 87.5 (3.44) | 66.0 (2.60) | 109.1 (4.30) | 132.1 (5.20) | 102.9 (4.05) | 89.3 (3.52) | 28.2 (1.11) | 838.5 (33.01) |
| Average snowfall cm (inches) | 95.7 (37.7) | 66.9 (26.3) | 32.9 (13.0) | 10.6 (4.2) | 0.2 (0.1) | 0.0 (0.0) | 0.0 (0.0) | 0.0 (0.0) | 0.0 (0.0) | 3.4 (1.3) | 23.1 (9.1) | 89.7 (35.3) | 322.5 (127.0) |
| Average precipitation days (≥ 0.2 mm) | 16.4 | 13.2 | 10.6 | 11.3 | 9.8 | 10.2 | 8.3 | 10.0 | 12.6 | 14.0 | 14.6 | 15.6 | 146.6 |
| Average rainy days (≥ 0.2 mm) | 1.7 | 2.4 | 5.1 | 9.2 | 9.8 | 10.2 | 8.3 | 10.0 | 12.6 | 13.6 | 10.3 | 3.3 | 96.4 |
| Average snowy days (≥ 0.2 cm) | 14.9 | 11.3 | 5.9 | 2.7 | 0.15 | 0.0 | 0.0 | 0.0 | 0.0 | 0.85 | 4.9 | 12.9 | 53.5 |
Source: Environment Canada

== Transportation ==
Lucknow once was served by a railway station along the long defunct Wellington, Grey and Bruce Railway line. Today Bruce County Roads 1 and 86 are the main transportation links for Lucknow.

== Bus Transportation ==
- First Student Canada (buses from Kincardine, Ontario) (for students bused to schools in Kincardine)
- Montgomery Bus Lines (buses from Wingham, Ontario) (for the Lucknow Central Public School students) (also bused to Kincardine and Wingham)
- Ross Young Bus Lines (buses from Tiverton, Ontario) (serving the Bruce County area)

== Notable people ==
=== Athletes ===
- George Chin (1929–2023), ice hockey player who won two consecutive NCAA championships with the Michigan Wolverines
- Dave Farrish (1956–), professional ice hockey player with the New York Rangers, Quebec Nordiques and Toronto Maple Leafs of the National Hockey League
- Paul Henderson (1943–), professional ice hockey player with the Detroit Red Wings, Toronto Maple Leafs and Atlanta Flames of the National Hockey League
- Murray Murdoch (1904–2001), professional ice hockey player with the New York Rangers of the National Hockey League
- Bobby Raymond (1985–), professional ice hockey player with the Binghamton Senators and Charlotte Checkers of the American Hockey League
- Julie-Anne Staehli (1993–), participated in the 2020 Summer Olympics in the 5000 metres event

=== Religion ===
- James Watton (1915–1995), metropolitan of Ontario 1974–1979

=== Politicians ===
- John Melvin Bryan Sr. (1886–1940), member of the Legislative Assembly of British Columbia 1924–1928 and 1937–1940
- Kenneth W. MacKenzie (1862–1929), mayor of Edmonton 1899–1901 and 1904–1905
- George William McDonald (1875–1950), member of the House of Commons of Canada 1935–1940
- Alexander Malcolm Nicholson (1900–1991), organizer for the Co-Operative Commonwealth Federation in 1935
- James Somerville (1826–1898), member of the House of Commons of Canada 1882–1887
