= 1995–96 WOAA Senior League season =

- League: WOAA Senior AA Hockey League
- Sport: Hockey
- Duration: Regular season October 1995 – January 1996; Playoffs; February 1996 – April 1996
- Teams: 20
- Finals champions: Sr. "AA" Champions - Durham Thundercats; Sr. "A" Champions - Brussels Crusaders; Sr. "B" Champions - Ripley Wolves

WOAA Senior League seasons
- 1994–95 1996–97

The 1995–96 WOAA Senior League season was the 6th season of the WOAA Senior AA Hockey League. The league played a regular season schedule which began in October 1995 and concluded in January 1996. The post-season began in February 1996 and concluded in April 1996.

The Durham Thundercats won the Sr. "AA" championship, defeating the Lakeshore Winterhawks in six games. The Brussels Crusaders won the Sr. "A" championship and the Dundalk Flyers won the Sr. "B" championship.

== Team changes ==
- The WOAA realigned into three divisions: Sr. "AA", Sr. "A" and Sr. "B".
- The Tiverton Thunder folded.
- The Goderich Pirates joined the league as an expansion team in the Senior "A" division.

== Senior "AA" ==
=== Final standings ===
Note: GP = Games played; W = Wins; L= Losses; OTL = Overtime losses; GF = Goals for; GA = Goals against; Pts = Points; Green shade = Clinched "AA" playoff spot

Rank	Senior "AA" Standings	GP	W	L	T	OTL	Pts	GF	GA
1	Durham Thundercats	24	18	6	0	0	36	141	94
2	Elora Rocks	24	16	8	0	0	32	118	108
3	Tavistock Royals	22	13	8	0	1	27	126	96
4	Milverton Four Wheel Drives	23	12	8	2	1	27	105	98
5	Wellesley Merchants	24	7	13	1	3	18	113	129
6	Lakeshore Winterhawks	22	8	14	0	0	16	102	128
7	Shelburne Muskies	21	4	16	1	0	9	98	150

=== Scoring leaders ===
Note: GP = Games played; G = Goals; A = Assists; Pts = Points; PIM = Penalty minutes

Player	Team	GP	G	A	Pts	PIM
Darren Snyder	Wellesley Merchants	22	15	29	44	74
Bill Jacques	Lakeshore Winterhawks	18	24	18	42	18
Jason Mervyn	Wellesley Merchants	17	22	20	42	14
Terry Hoelscher	Elora Rocks	20	17	21	38	8
Rob LeBlanc	Durham Thundercats	22	25	12	37	100
Mike Allen	Tavistock Royals	19	22	15	37	10
Jeff McClenaghan	Tavistock Royals	18	7	28	35	59
Jim Grieve	Lakeshore Winterhawks	21	9	24	33	8
Keith MacMillan	Durham Thundercats	24	19	13	32	15
Greg Snyder	Tavistock Royals	18	13	19	32	53

=== Sr. "AA" playoff bracket ===
Sr. "AA" quarter-finals
1	Durham	bye
3	Tavistock	4
4	Milverton	0
2	Elora	4
5	Wellesley	0
6	Lakeshore	4
7	Shelburne	2

Sr. "AA" semi-finals
1	Durham	4
3	Tavistock	3
2	Elora	2
6	Lakeshore	4

Sr. "AA" finals
1	Durham	4
6	Lakeshore	0

==== WOAA Sr. "AA" quarter-finals ====
===== (2) Elora Rocks vs. (5) Wellesley Merchants =====
February 9	Wellesley Merchants	6 – 8	Elora Rocks	Elora

February 16	Elora Rocks	5 – 4	Wellesley Merchants	Wellesley

February 17	Wellesley Merchants	3 – 4	Elora Rocks	Elora

February 18	Elora Rocks	2 – 1	Wellesley Merchants	Wellesley

Elora wins series 4 – 0

===== (3) Tavistock Royals vs. (6) Milverton Four Wheel Drives =====
Note: Game four was played in New Hamburg, Ontario.

February 10	Milverton Four Wheel Drives	3 – 2	Tavistock Royals	Tavistock

February 12	Milverton Four Wheel Drives	2 – 8	Tavistock Royals	Tavistock

February 17	Tavistock Royals	7 – 5	Milverton Four Wheel Drives	Milverton

February 18	Milverton Four Wheel Drives	5 – 6	OT	Tavistock Royals	Tavistock

Tavistock wins series 4 – 0

===== (6) Lakeshore Winterhawks vs. (7) Shelburne Muskies =====
February 9	Shelburne Muskies	4 – 5	Lakeshore Winterhawks	Southampton

February 10	Lakeshore Winterhawks	1 – 2	Shelburne Muskies	Shelburne

February 16	Shelburne Muskies	4 – 5	OT	Lakeshore Winterhawks	Southampton

February 17	Lakeshore Winterhawks	3 – 5	Shelburne Muskies	Shelburne

February 20	Lakeshore Winterhawks	11 – 4	Shelburne Muskies	Shelburne

February 23	Shelburne Muskies	3 – 9	Lakeshore Winterhawks	Southampton

Lakeshore wins series 4 – 2

==== WOAA Sr. "AA" semi-finals ====
===== (1) Durham Thundercats vs. (3) Tavistock Royals =====
March 2	Tavistock Royals	4 – 2	Durham Thundercats	Durham

March 8	Tavistock Royals	5 – 4	OT	Durham Thundercats	Durham

March 10	Durham Thundercats	6 – 5	OT	Tavistock Royals	New Hamburg

March 13	Tavistock Royals	5 – 2	Durham Thundercats	Durham

March 15	Tavistock Royals	5 – 4	OT	Durham Thundercats	Durham

March 17	Tavistock Royals	5 – 3	Durham Thundercats	Durham

March 20	Tavistock Royals	1 – 5	Durham Thundercats	Durham

Durham wins series 4 – 3

===== (2) Elora Rocks vs. (6) Lakeshore Winterhawks =====
March 1	Lakeshore Winterhawks	2 – 4	Elora Rocks	Elora

March 3	Elora Rocks	2 – 3	Lakeshore Winterhawks	Southampton

March 8	Elora Rocks	1 – 2	Lakeshore Winterhawks	Southampton

March 10	Lakeshore Winterhawks	7 – 2	Elora Rocks	Elora

March 15	Lakeshore Winterhawks	0 – 4	Elora Rocks	Elora

March 16	Elora Rocks	1 – 5	Lakeshore Winterhawks	Southampton

Lakeshore wins series 4 – 2

==== WOAA Sr. "AA" Championship ====
===== (1) Durham Thundercats vs. (6) Lakeshore Winterhawks =====
March 29	Lakeshore Winterhawks	2 – 6	Durham Thundercats	Durham

March 31	Durham Thundercats	2 – 1	Lakeshore Winterhawks	Southampton

April 6	Lakeshore Winterhawks	1 – 6	Durham Thundercats	Durham

April 7	Durham Thundercats	4 – 1	Lakeshore Winterhawks	Southampton

Durham wins series 4 – 0

== Senior "A" ==
=== Final standings ===
Note: GP = Games played; W = Wins; L= Losses; OTL = Overtime losses; GF = Goals for; GA = Goals against; Pts = Points; Green shade = Clinched "A" playoff spot

Rank	Senior "AA" Standings	GP	W	L	T	OTL	Pts	GF	GA
1	Ripley Wolves	24	17	4	2	1	37	170	105
2	Wiarton Redmen	24	17	5	1	1	36	153	107
3	Brussels Crusaders	24	16	6	2	0	34	154	104
4	Clinton Radar	24	10	11	3	0	23	116	116
5	Palmerston 81's	24	9	14	1	0	19	104	105
6	Arthur Tigers	24	9	14	1	0	19	129	151
7	Drayton Comets	24	7	14	2	1	17	112	121
8	Goderich Pirates	24	5	19	0	0	10	97	226

=== Scoring leaders ===
Note: GP = Games played; G = Goals; A = Assists; Pts = Points; PIM = Penalty minutes

Player	Team	GP	G	A	Pts	PIM
Sean Burton	Ripley Wolves	24	47	35	82	4
Ryan Thompson	Wiarton Redmen	24	34	31	65	22
Don Richardson	Wiarton Redmen	24	23	41	64	20
Brent Armstrong	Ripley Wolves	22	24	37	61	8
Mike Reaume	Ripley Wolves	19	14	34	48	29
Tim Harrison	Clinton Radar	23	26	21	47	32
Corey McKee	Brussels Crusaders	23	15	25	40	24
Tim Fritz	Brussels Crusaders	20	12	27	39	79
Darryl Hancock	Arthur Tigers	17	21	17	38	54
Jeff Resmer	Drayton Comets	24	16	20	36	70

=== Sr. "A" playoff bracket ===
Sr. "A" preliminary round
1	Ripley	4
8	Goderich	1
4	Clinton	4
5	Palmerston	0
2	Wiarton	4
7	Drayton	1
3	Brussels	4
6	Arthur	0

Sr. "A" semi-finals
1	Ripley	4
4	Clinton	1
2	Wiarton	2
3	Brussels	4

Sr. "A" finals
1	Ripley	1
3	Brussels	4

==== WOAA Sr. "A" quarter-finals ====
===== (1) Ripley Wolves vs. (8) Goderich Pirates =====
February 9	Goderich Pirates	2 – 5	Ripley Wolves	Ripley

February 11	Ripley Wolves	3 – 7	Goderich Pirates	Goderich

February 16	Goderich Pirates	2 – 6	Ripley Wolves	Ripley

February 18	Ripley Wolves	4 – 2	Goderich Pirates	Goderich

February 19	Goderich Pirates	2 – 9	Ripley Wolves	Ripley

Ripley wins series 4 – 1

===== (2) Wiarton Redmen vs. (7) Drayton Comets =====
February 9	Drayton Comets	3 – 5	Wiarton Redmen	Wiarton

February 11	Wiarton Redmen	3 – 5	Drayton Comets	Drayton

February 16	Drayton Comets	5 – 6	Wiarton Redmen	Wiarton

February 18	Wiarton Redmen	7 – 3	Drayton Comets	Drayton

February 23	Drayton Comets	8 – 9	OT	Wiarton Redmen	Wiarton

Wiarton wins series 4 – 1

===== (3) Brussels Crusaders vs. (6) Arthur Tigers =====
February 10	Arthur Tigers	7 – 9	Brussels Crusaders	Brussels

February 13	Brussels Crusaders	10 – 3	Arthur Tigers	Arthur

February 16	Brussels Crusaders	6 – 4	Arthur Tigers	Arthur

February 17	Arthur Tigers	5 – 6	OT	Brussels Crusaders	Brussels

Brussels wins series 4 – 0

===== (4) Clinton Radar vs. (5) Palmerston 81's =====
February 9	Palmerston 81's	3 – 5	Clinton Radar	Clinton

February 11	Clinton Radar	6 – 3	Palmerston 81's	Palmerston

February 15	Clinton Radar	7 – 5	Palmerston 81's	Palmerston

February 18	Palmerston 81's	3 – 8	Clinton Radar	Clinton

Clinton wins series 4 – 0

==== WOAA Sr. "A" semi-finals ====
===== (1) Ripley Wolves vs. (4) Clinton Radar =====
March 1	Clinton Radar	4 – 7	Ripley Wolves	Ripley

March 8	Ripley Wolves	1 – 2	Clinton Radar	Clinton

March 9	Clinton Radar	2 – 5	Ripley Wolves	Ripley

March 10	Ripley Wolves	5 – 4	2OT	Clinton Radar	Clinton

March 15	Clinton Radar	2 – 5	Ripley Wolves	Ripley

Ripley wins series 4 – 1

===== (2) Wiarton Redmen vs. (3) Brussels Crusaders =====
Note: Game four played in Lucknow, Ontario.

February 25	Brussels Crusaders	5 – 7	Wiarton Redmen	Wiarton

March 2	Wiarton Redmen	1 – 4	Brussels Crusaders	Brussels

March 8	Brussels Crusaders	7 – 8	Wiarton Redmen	Wiarton

March 9	Wiarton Redmen	2 – 9	Brussels Crusaders	Brussels

March 10	Brussels Crusaders	8 – 5	Wiarton Redmen	Wiarton

March 16	Wiarton Redmen	0 – 3	Brussels Crusaders	Brussels

Brussels wins series 4 – 2

==== WOAA Sr. "A" Championship ====
===== (1) Ripley Wolves vs. (3) Brussels Crusaders =====
March 22	Brussels Crusaders	4 – 3	Ripley Wolves	Ripley

March 23	Ripley Wolves	3 – 8	Brussels Crusaders	Brussels

March 29	Brussels Crusaders	4 – 5	Ripley Wolves	Ripley

March 30	Ripley Wolves	3 – 6	Brussels Crusaders	Brussels

April 5	Brussels Crusaders	8 – 5	Ripley Wolves	Ripley

Brussels wins series 4 – 1

== Senior "B" ==
=== Final standings ===
Note: GP = Games played; W = Wins; L= Losses; OTL = Overtime losses; GF = Goals for; GA = Goals against; Pts = Points; Green shade = Clinched "B" playoff spot

Rank	Senior "B" Standings	GP	W	L	T	OTL	Pts	GF	GA
1	Dundalk Flyers	16	12	3	0	1	25	105	57
2	Mildmay Monarchs	16	11	4	1	0	23	75	60
3	Lucknow Lancers	16	8	7	1	0	17	85	66
4	Teeswater Falcons	16	4	9	2	1	11	73	89
5	Grand Valley Tornadoes	16	2	11	2	1	7	65	131

=== Scoring leaders ===
Note: GP = Games played; G = Goals; A = Assists; Pts = Points; PIM = Penalty minutes

Player	Team	GP	G	A	Pts	PIM
Brad Murray	Lucknow Lancers	14	20	27	47	24
Lou Bellwood	Dundalk Flyers	16	16	24	40	61
Brad Priestap	Lucknow Lancers	15	11	21	32	27
Greg Bratton	Grand Valley Tornadoes	14	13	18	31	47
Shawn Miller	Dundalk Flyers	12	11	15	26	46
Joe Zettler	Mildmay Monarchs	16	8	16	24	2
Troy Fischer	Teeswater Falcons	14	12	11	23	30
Todd Davis	Dundalk Flyers	13	16	6	22	23
Kyle Cronin	Teeswater Falcons	13	11	11	22	2
Brian Gillespie	Grand Valley Tornadoes	15	9	13	22	52

=== Sr. "B" playoff bracket ===
Sr. "B" preliminary round
1	Dundalk	bye
4	Teeswater	2
5	Grand Valley	0
2	Mildmay	bye
3	Lucknow	bye

Sr. "B" semi-finals
1	Dundalk	4
4	Teeswater	0
2	Mildmay	2
3	Lucknow	4

Sr. "B" finals
1	Dundalk	4
3	Lucknow	0

==== WOAA Sr. "B" preliminary round ====
===== (4) Teeswater Falcons vs. (5) Grand Valley Tornadoes =====
February 9	Teeswater Falcons	12 – 3	Grand Valley Tornadoes	Grand Valley

February 11	Grand Valley Tornadoes	4 – 7	Teeswater Falcons	Teeswater

Teeswater wins series 2 – 0

==== WOAA Sr. "B" semi-finals ====
===== (1) Dundalk Flyers vs. (4) Teeswater Falcons =====
February 17	Teeswater Falcons	4 – 5	OT	Dundalk Flyers	Dundalk

February 18	Dundalk Flyers	5 – 2	Teeswater Falcons	Teeswater

February 24	Teeswater Falcons	3 – 11	Dundalk Flyers	Dundalk

February 25	Dundalk Flyers	6 – 3	Teeswater Falcons	Teeswater

Dundalk wins series 4 – 0

===== (2) Mildmay Monarchs vs. (3) Lucknow Lancers =====
February 16	Lucknow Lancers	5 – 3	Mildmay Monarchs	Mildmay

February 18	Mildmay Monarchs	4 – 2	Lucknow Lancers	Lucknow

February 24	Mildmay Monarchs	3 – 1	Lucknow Lancers	Lucknow

February 25	Lucknow Lancers	6 – 4	Mildmay Monarchs	Mildmay

March 1	Lucknow Lancers	8 – 3	Mildmay Monarchs	Mildmay

March 2	Mildmay Monarchs	1 – 4	Lucknow Lancers	Lucknow

Lucknow wins series 4 – 2

==== WOAA Sr. "B" Championship ====
===== (1) Dundalk Flyers vs. (3) Lucknow Lancers =====
March 9	Lucknow Lancers	2 – 4	Dundalk Flyers	Dundalk

March 10	Dundalk Flyers	6 – 4	Lucknow Lancers	Lucknow

March 16	Lucknow Lancers	4 – 5	OT	Dundalk Flyers	Dundalk

March 17	Dundalk Flyers	5 – 2	Lucknow Lancers	Lucknow

Dundalk wins series 4 – 0
