= 1992–93 WOAA Senior League season =

- League: WOAA Senior AA Hockey League
- Sport: Hockey
- Duration: Regular season October 1992 – January 1993; Playoffs; February 1993 – March 1993
- Teams: 16
- Finals champions: Sr. "A" Champions - Durham Thundercats; Sr. "B" Champions - Grand Valley Tornadoes

WOAA Senior League seasons
- 1991–92 1993–94

The 1992–93 WOAA Senior League season was the 3rd season of the WOAA Senior AA Hockey League. The league played a regular season schedule which began in October 1992 and concluded in January 1993. The post-season began in February 1993 and concluded in March 1993.

The Durham Thundercats won the Sr. "A" championship, while the Grand Valley Tornadoes won the Sr. "B" championship.

== Team changes ==
- The Harriston Blues fold after one season in the league.
- The Brussels Crusaders take a leave of absence from the league.

== Senior "A" ==
=== Final standings ===
Note: GP = Games played; W = Wins; L= Losses; OTL = Overtime losses; GF = Goals for; GA = Goals against; Pts = Points; Green shade = Clinched playoff spot

Rank	Senior "A" Standings	GP	W	L	T	Pts	GF	GA
1	Durham Thundercats	24	18	2	4	40	139	88
2	Tavistock Royals	24	14	5	5	33	138	81
3	Milverton Four Wheel Drives	24	13	9	2	28	140	107
4	Drayton Comets	24	12	8	4	28	137	134
5	Arthur Tigers	24	8	15	1	17	102	147
6	Kincardine Kings	24	7	15	2	16	126	173
7	Wiarton Redmen	24	6	14	4	16	108	134
8	Palmerston 81's	24	4	14	6	14	110	134

=== Scoring leaders ===
Note: GP = Games played; G = Goals; A = Assists; Pts = Points; PIM = Penalty minutes

Player	Team	GP	G	A	Pts	PIM
Tim Fritz	Milverton Four Wheel Drives	22	34	31	65	43
Sean Burton	Kincardine Kings	24	34	27	61	2
Ken Gosleigh	Kincardine Kings	24	28	30	58	37
Mike Chapman	Milverton Four Wheel Drives	23	14	42	56	42
Craig Schwartzentruber	Milverton Four Wheel Drives	24	31	25	56	22
Mich Landry	Drayton Comets	21	23	32	55	20
Mark Albrecht	Tavistock Royals	24	24	29	53	16
Brian Campbell	Milverton Four Wheel Drives	24	22	24	46	21
Darryl Jack	Drayton Comets	22	24	20	44	24
Tom O'Donnell	Arthur Tigers	22	23	20	43	9

=== Sr. "A" playoff bracket ===
Sr. "A" quarter-finals
1	Durham	3
8	Palmerston	0
4	Drayton	2
5	Arthur	3
2	Tavistock	3
7	Wiarton	0
3	Milverton	3
6	Kincardine	1

Sr. "A" semi-finals
1	Durham	4
5	Arthur	0
2	Tavistock	4
3	Milverton	1

Sr. "A" finals
1	Durham	4
2	Tavistock	2

==== WOAA Sr. "A" quarter-finals ====
===== (1) Durham Thundercats vs. (8) Palmerston 81's =====
Note: Palmerston's lone home game was played in Harriston, Ontario

February 4	Palmerston 81's	3 – 6	Durham Thundercats	Durham

February 7	Durham Thundercats	5 – 4	Palmerston 81's	Harriston

February 12	Palmerston 81's	2 – 9	Durham Thundercats	Durham

Durham wins series 3 – 0

===== (2) Tavistock Royals vs. (7) Wiarton Redmen =====
February 7	Tavistock Royals	7 – 3	Wiarton Redmen	Wiarton

February 8	Wiarton Redmen	3 – 9	Tavistock Royals	Tavistock

February 13	Wiarton Redmen	2 – 12	Tavistock Royals	Tavistock

Tavistock wins series 3 – 0

===== (3) Milverton Four Wheel Drives vs. (6) Kincardine Kings =====
February 5	Milverton Four Wheel Drives	4 – 5	OT	Kincardine Kings	Kincardine

February 7	Kincardine Kings	4 – 10	Milverton Four Wheel Drives	Milverton

February 9	Kincardine Kings	3 – 11	Milverton Four Wheel Drives	Milverton

February 12	Milverton Four Wheel Drives	8 – 1	Kincardine Kings	Kincardine

Milverton wins series 3 – 1

===== (4) Drayton Comets vs. (5) Arthur Tigers =====
February 2	Arthur Tigers	2 – 5	Drayton Comets	Drayton

February 5	Drayton Comets	3 – 4	OT	Arthur Tigers	Arthur

February 7	Arthur Tigers	6 – 4	Drayton Comets	Drayton

February 12	Drayton Comets	4 – 3	Arthur Tigers	Arthur

February 14	Arthur Tigers	5 – 0	Drayton Comets	Drayton

Arthur wins series 3 – 2

==== WOAA Sr. "A" semi-finals ====
===== (1) Durham Thundercats vs. (5) Arthur Tigers =====
February 19	Arthur Tigers	2 – 9	Durham Thundercats	Durham

February 21	Durham Thundercats	4 – 3	Arthur Tigers	Arthur

February 27	Durham Thundercats	5 – 4	Arthur Tigers	Arthur

February 28	Arthur Tigers	3 – 4	Durham Thundercats	Durham

Durham wins series 4 – 0

===== (2) Tavistock Royals vs. (3) Milverton Four Wheel Drives =====
Note: Game five was played in Stratford, Ontario

February 21	Tavistock Royals	6 – 5	OT	Milverton Four Wheel Drives	Milverton

February 22	Milverton Four Wheel Drives	4 – 9	Tavistock Royals	Tavistock

February 27	Tavistock Royals	3 – 2	Milverton Four Wheel Drives	Milverton

March 1	Milverton Four Wheel Drives	6 – 4	Tavistock Royals	Tavistock

March 5	Milverton Four Wheel Drives	6 – 8	Tavistock Royals	Tavistock

Tavistock wins series 4 – 1

==== WOAA Sr. "A" Championship ====
===== (1) Durham Thundercats vs. (2) Tavistock Royals =====
March 12	Tavistock Royals	3 – 5	Durham Thundercats	Durham

March 14	Durham Thundercats	5 – 4	Tavistock Royals	Tavistock

March 21	Tavistock Royals	5 – 7	Durham Thundercats	Durham

March 22	Durham Thundercats	6 – 7	OT	Tavistock Royals	Tavistock

March 25	Tavistock Royals	7 – 6	OT	Durham Thundercats	Durham

March 29	Durham Thundercats	5 – 4	OT	Tavistock Royals	Tavistock

Durham wins series 4 – 2

== Senior "B" ==
=== Final standings ===
Note: GP = Games played; W = Wins; L= Losses; OTL = Overtime losses; GF = Goals for; GA = Goals against; Pts = Points; Green shade = Clinched playoff spot

Rank	Senior "B" Standings	GP	W	L	T	Pts	GF	GA
1	Grand Valley Tornadoes	21	14	6	1	29	153	113
2	Dundalk Fluyers	21	12	6	3	27	145	114
3	Lucknow Lancers	21	11	7	3	25	145	122
4	Ripley Wolves	21	11	7	3	25	126	101
5	Mildmay Monarchs	21	10	10	1	21	132	136
6	Lion's Head North Stars	21	7	11	3	17	106	120
7	Teeswater Falcons	21	6	13	2	14	103	153
8	Tiverton Thunder	21	4	15	2	10	81	132

=== Scoring leaders ===
Note: GP = Games played; G = Goals; A = Assists; Pts = Points; PIM = Penalty minutes

Player	Team	GP	G	A	Pts	PIM
Sean Vanalstine	Dundalk Flyers	20	38	26	64	65
Steve Simpson	Lucknow Lancers	21	27	33	60	2
Don Zeggill	Dundalk Flyers	20	20	38	58	15
Murray Hunter	Grand Valley Tornadoes	20	21	29	50	26
Brent Armstrong	Ripley Wolves	17	21	26	47	4
Kyle Cronin	Teeswater Falcons	19	21	26	47	6
Clayton Callaway	Grand Valley Tornadoes	18	25	21	46	31
Bill Patterson	Ripley Wolves	21	12	30	42	26
Scott Hackett	Lucknow Lancers	15	26	15	41	22
Brad Priestap	Lucknow Lancers	21	20	20	40	88

=== Sr. "B" playoff bracket ===
Sr. "B" quarter-finals
1	Grand Valley	3
8	Tiverton	0
3	Lucknow	2
6	Lion's Head	3
2	Dundalk	3
7	Teeswater	1
4	Ripley	1
5	Mildmay	3

Sr. "B" semi-finals
1	Grand Valley	4
6	Lion's Head	1
2	Dundalk	4
5	Mildmay	2

Sr. "B" finals
6	Grand Valley	4
2	Dundalk	1

==== WOAA Sr. "B" quarter-finals ====
===== (1) Grand Valley Tornadoes vs. (8) Tiverton Thunder =====
February 5	Grand Valley Tornadoes	10 – 7	Tiverton Thunder	Tiverton

February 6	Tiverton Thunder	3 – 7	Grand Valley Tornadoes	Grand Valley

February 7	Tiverton Thunder	7 – 8	OT	Grand Valley Tornadoes	Grand Valley

Grand Valley wins series 3 – 0

===== (2) Dundalk Flyers vs. (7) Teeswater Falcons =====
February 6	Teeswater Falcons	1 – 16	Dundalk Flyers	Dundalk

February 7	Dundalk Flyers	5 – 4	Teeswater Falcons	Teeswater

February 13	Teeswater Falcons	8 – 4	Dundalk Flyers	Dundalk

February 14	Dundalk Flyers	9 – 5	Teeswater Falcons	Teeswater

Dundalk wins series 3 – 1

===== (3) Lucknow Lancers vs. (6) Lion's Head North Stars =====
February 5	Lion's Head North Stars	9 – 10	OT	Lucknow Lancers	Lucknow

February 7	Lucknow Lancers	3 – 2	Lion's Head North Stars	Lion's Head

February 12	Lion's Head North Stars	7 – 6	Lucknow Lancers	Lucknow

February 14	Lucknow Lancers	6 – 8	Lion's Head North Stars	Lion's Head

February 17	Lion's Head North Stars	5 – 2	Lucknow Lancers	Lucknow

Lion's Head wins series 3 – 2

===== (4) Ripley Wolves vs. (5) Mildmay Monarchs =====
February 5	Mildmay Monarchs	6 – 8	Ripley Wolves	Ripley

February 7	Ripley Wolves	3 – 6	Mildmay Monarchs	Mildmay

February 12	Mildmay Monarchs	9 – 5	Ripley Wolves	Ripley

February 13	Ripley Wolves	8 – 10	Mildmay Monarchs	Mildmay

Mildmay wins series 3 – 1

==== WOAA Sr. "B" semi-finals ====
===== (1) Grand Valley Tornadoes vs. (6) Lion's Head North Stars =====
February 20	Lion's Head North Stars	1 – 7	Grand Valley Tornadoes	Grand Valley

February 24	Grand Valley Tornadoes	4 – 5	Lion's Head North Stars	Lion's Head

February 27	Lion's Head North Stars	4 – 9	Grand Valley Tornadoes	Grand Valley

February 28	Grand Valley Tornadoes	5 – 2	Lion's Head North Stars	Lion's Head

March 5	Lion's Head North Stars	7 – 10	Grand Valley Tornadoes	Grand Valley

Grand Valley wins series 4 – 1

===== (2) Dundalk Flyers vs. (5) Mildmay Monarchs =====
February 21	Mildmay Monarchs	3 – 9	Dundalk Flyers	Dundalk

February 26	Dundalk Flyers	2 – 5	Mildmay Monarchs	Mildmay

February 27	Mildmay Monarchs	3 – 9	Dundalk Flyers	Dundalk

February 28	Dundalk Flyers	9 – 6	Mildmay Monarchs	Mildmay

March 6	Mildmay Monarchs	5 – 4	OT	Dundalk Flyers	Dundalk

March 7	Dundalk Flyers	7 – 6	OT	Mildmay Monarchs	Mildmay

Dundalk wins series 4 – 2

==== WOAA Sr. "B" Championship ====
===== (1) Grand Valley Tornadoes vs. (2) Dundalk Flyers =====
March 13	Dundalk Flyers	12 – 9	Grand Valley Tornadoes	Grand Valley

March 14	Grand Valley Tornadoes	4 – 1	Dundalk Flyers	Dundalk

March 18	Dundalk Flyers	1 – 6	Grand Valley Tornadoes	Grand Valley

March 21	Grand Valley Tornadoes	5 – 3	Dundalk Flyers	Dundalk

March 27	Dundalk Flyers	2 – 6	Grand Valley Tornadoes	Grand Valley

Grand Valley wins series 4 – 1
