= 1997–98 WOAA Senior League season =

- League: WOAA Senior AA Hockey League
- Sport: Hockey
- Duration: Regular season October 1997 – February 1998; Playoffs; February 1998 – April 1998
- Teams: 15
- Finals champions: Sr. "AA" Champions - Durham Thundercats; Sr. "A" Champions - Shelburne Muskies

WOAA Senior League seasons
- 1996–97 1998–99

The 1997–98 WOAA Senior League season was the 8th season of the WOAA Senior AA Hockey League. The league played a regular season schedule which began in October 1997 and concluded in February 1998. The post-season began in February 1998 and concluded in April 1998.

The Durham Thundercats won the Sr. "AA" championship, defeating the Milverton Four Wheel Drives in four games. The Shelburne Muskies won the Sr. "A" championship.

== Team changes ==
- The Sr. "B" division merged with the Sr. "A" division. The Sr. "A" division was divided into East and West Divisions.
- The Brussels Crusaders took a leave of absence.
- The Drayton Comets folded.
- The Grand Valley Tornadoes folded.
- The Teeswater Falcons folded.

== Senior "AA" ==
=== Final standings ===
Note: GP = Games played; W = Wins; L= Losses; OTL = Overtime losses; GF = Goals for; GA = Goals against; Pts = Points; Green shade = Clinched "AA" playoff spot

Rank	Senior "AA" Standings	GP	W	L	T	OTL	Pts	GF	GA
1	Durham Thundercats	26	19	4	3	0	41	182	98
2	Milverton Four Wheel Drives	26	19	5	1	1	40	125	86
3	Tavistock Royals	26	15	9	2	0	32	146	94
4	Wellesley Merchants	26	15	9	1	1	32	102	91
5	Elora Rocks	26	6	16	1	3	16	93	155

=== Scoring leaders ===
Note: GP = Games played; G = Goals; A = Assists; Pts = Points; PIM = Penalty minutes

Player	Team	GP	G	A	Pts	PIM
Shane Johnson	Tavistock Royals	25	31	27	58	12
Jeremy Franks	Durham Thundercats	26	32	21	53	30
Scott Betts	Durham Thundercats	19	15	35	50	17
Keith MacMillan	Durham Thundercats	24	25	18	43	21
Rob LeBlanc	Durham Thundercats	21	22	19	41	65
Mark Germann	Tavistock Royals	22	8	29	37	51
Kory Dietz	Milverton Four Wheel Drives	25	14	22	36	46
Ron White	Tavistock Royals	18	15	19	34	14
Dan Neil	Durham Thundercats	21	15	18	33	126
Greg Snyder	Tavistock Royals	18	16	14	30	20

=== Sr. "AA" playoff bracket ===
Sr. "AA" preliminary
1	Durham	bye
4	Wellesley	3
5	Elora	1
2	Milverton	bye
3	Tavistock	bye

Sr. "AA" semi-finals
1	Durham	4
4	Wellesley	2
2	Milverton	4
3	Tavistock	1

Sr. "AA" finals
1	Durham	4
2	Milverton	0

==== WOAA Sr. "AA" preliminary round ====
===== (4) Wellesley Merchants vs. (5) Elora Rocks =====
February 20	Elora Rocks	2 – 5	Wellesley Merchants	Wellesley

February 25	Wellesley Merchants	6 – 3	Elora Rocks	Elora

February 27	Wellesley Merchants	1 – 3	Elora Rocks	Elora

March 2	Elora Rocks	3 – 6	Wellesley Merchants	Wellesley

Wellesley wins series 3 – 1

==== WOAA Sr. "AA" semi-finals ====
===== (1) Durham Thundercats vs. (4) Wellesley Merchants =====
March 6	Wellesley Merchants	6 – 5	Durham Thundercats	Durham

March 7	Durham Thundercats	2 – 1	Wellesley Merchants	Wellesley

March 12	Wellesley Merchants	5 – 3	Durham Thundercats	Durham

March 15	Durham Thundercats	8 – 2	Wellesley Merchants	Wellesley

March 20	Wellesley Merchants	3 – 8	Durham Thundercats	Durham

March 21	Durham Thundercats	5 – 4	OT	Wellesley Merchants	Wellesley

Durham wins series 4 – 2

===== (2) Milverton Four Wheel Drives vs. (3) Tavistock Royals =====
February 28	Tavistock Royals	4 – 10	Milverton Four Wheel Drives	Milverton

March 6	Milverton Four Wheel Drives	3 – 6	Tavistock Royals	Tavistock

March 7	Tavistock Royals	1 – 3	Milverton Four Wheel Drives	Milverton

March 13	Milverton Four Wheel Drives	4 – 3	Tavistock Royals	Tavistock

March 14	Tavistock Royals	2 – 7	Milverton Four Wheel Drives	Milverton

Milverton wins series 4 – 1

==== WOAA Sr. "AA" Championship ====
===== (1) Durham Thundercats vs. (2) Milverton Four Wheel Drives =====
Note: Game four was played in Mitchell, Ontario.

March 28	Milverton Four Wheel Drives	0 – 5	Durham Thundercats	Durham

March 29	Durham Thundercats	5 – 4	Milverton Four Wheel Drives	Milverton

April 3	Milverton Four Wheel Drives	5 – 7	Durham Thundercats	Durham

April 4	Durham Thundercats	4 – 2	Milverton Four Wheel Drives	Milverton

Durham wins series 4 – 0

== Senior "A" ==
=== Final standings ===
Note: GP = Games played; W = Wins; L= Losses; OTL = Overtime losses; GF = Goals for; GA = Goals against; Pts = Points; Green shade = Clinched "A" playoff spot

Rank	East Division	GP	W	L	T	OTL	Pts	GF	GA
1	Shelburne Muskies	24	17	6	1	0	35	156	120
2	Wiarton Redmen	24	12	12	0	0	24	123	108
3	Palmerston 81's	24	10	11	3	0	23	104	107
4	Arthur Tigers	24	6	16	2	0	14	125	162
5	Dundalk Flyers	24	5	16	3	0	13	91	148

Rank	West Division	GP	W	L	T	OTL	Pts	GF	GA
1	Lucknow Lancers	24	17	4	0	3	37	125	76
2	Ripley Wolves	24	11	12	0	1	23	111	116
3	Goderich Pirates	24	10	12	1	1	22	111	130
4	Clinton Radar	24	7	15	2	0	14	100	123
5	Mildmay Monarchs	24	5	17	2	0	12	62	139

=== Scoring leaders ===
Note: GP = Games played; G = Goals; A = Assists; Pts = Points; PIM = Penalty minutes

Player	Team	GP	G	A	Pts	PIM
Glenn Watt	Arthur Tigers	24	13	39	52	8
Sean Burton	Ripley Wolves	24	20	27	47	12
Greg McNevan	Palmerston 81's	23	22	22	44	29
Dave Ritchie	Shelburne Muskies	22	23	19	42	28
Justin Murray	Lucknow Lancers	22	18	23	41	62
Brad Robinson	Lucknow Lancers	20	19	21	40	22
Tim Harrison	Goderich Pirates	20	26	13	39	58
Kevin Greco	Shelburne Muskies	15	18	21	39	13
Mark Armatage	Shelburne Muskies	20	10	28	38	12
Ron Coughler	Arthur Tigers	21	14	23	37	32

=== Sr. "A" playoff bracket ===
Preliminary round
E1	Shelburne	bye
E4	Arthur	2
E5	Dundalk	0
E2	Wiarton	bye
E3	Palmerston	bye
W1	Lucknow	bye
W2	Ripley	1
W3	Goderich	2
W4	Clinton	bye
W5	Mildmay	bye

Division semi-finals
E1	Shelburne	4
E4	Arthur	2
E2	Wiarton	4
E3	Palmerston	2
W1	Lucknow	3
W3	Goderich	4
W4	Clinton	4
W5	Mildmay	0

Division finals
E1	Shelburne	4
E2	Wiarton	2
W3	Goderich	3
W4	Clinton	4

Sr. "A" finals
E1	Shelburne	3
W4	Clinton	0

==== WOAA Sr. "A" preliminary round ====
===== (E4) Arthur Tigers vs. (E5) Dundalk Flyers =====
February 13	Dundalk Flyers	4 – 8	Arthur Tigers	Arthur

February 14	Arthur Tigers	4 – 3	OT	Dundalk Flyers	Dundalk

Arthur wins series 2 – 0

===== (W2) Ripley Wolves vs. (W3) Goderich Pirates =====
February 13	Ripley Wolves	6 – 3	Goderich Pirates	Goderich

February 14	Goderich Pirates	3 – 2	Ripley Wolves	Ripley

February 16	Goderich Pirates	5 – 3	Ripley Wolves	Ripley

Goderich wins series 2 – 1

==== WOAA Sr. "A" divisional semi-finals ====
===== (E1) Shelburne Muskies vs. (E4) Arthur Tigers =====
February 21	Shelburne Muskies	4 – 9	Arthur Tigers	Arthur

February 22	Shelburne Muskies	8 – 5	Arthur Tigers	Arthur

February 27	Arthur Tigers	4 – 8	Shelburne Muskies	Shelburne

March 1	Arthur Tigers	3 – 1	Shelburne Muskies	Shelburne

March 6	Arthur Tigers	7 – 8	OT	Shelburne Muskies	Shelburne

March 7	Shelburne Muskies	7 – 1	Arthur Tigers	Arthur

Shelburne wins series 4 – 2

===== (E2) Wiarton Redmen vs. (E3) Palmerston 81's =====
Note: Games four and six were played in Harriston, Ontario.

February 13	Palmerston 81's	3 – 5	Wiarton Redmen	Wiarton

February 20	Wiarton Redmen	3 – 7	Palmerston 81's	Palmerston

February 22	Palmerston 81's	2 – 6	Wiarton Redmen	Wiarton

February 27	Wiarton Redmen	0 – 4	Palmerston 81's	Palmerston

March 1	Palmerston 81's	3 – 6	Wiarton Redmen	Wiarton

March 6	Wiarton Redmen	3 – 1	Palmerston 81's	Palmerston

Wiarton wins series 4 – 2

===== (W1) Lucknow Lancers vs. (W3) Goderich Pirates =====
February 20	Goderich Pirates	6 – 5	Lucknow Lancers	Lucknow

February 22	Goderich Pirates	7 – 4	Lucknow Lancers	Lucknow

February 27	Lucknow Lancers	5 – 1	Goderich Pirates	Goderich

March 1	Lucknow Lancers	7 – 6	OT	Goderich Pirates	Goderich

March 6	Goderich Pirates	5 – 6	Lucknow Lancers	Lucknow

March 7	Lucknow Lancers	4 – 6	Goderich Pirates	Goderich

March 8	Goderich Pirates	5 – 2	Lucknow Lancers	Lucknow

Goderich wins series 4 – 3

===== (W4) Clinton Radar vs. (W5) Mildmay Monarchs =====
February 20	Mildmay Monarchs	3 – 6	Clinton Radar	Clinton

February 22	Clinton Radar	3 – 2	OT	Mildmay Monarchs	Mildmay

February 27	Mildmay Monarchs	0 – 5	Clinton Radar	Clinton

March 1	Clinton Radar	6 – 1	Mildmay Monarchs	Mildmay

Clinton wins series 4 – 0

==== WOAA Sr. "A" divisional finals ====
===== (E1) Shelburne Muskies vs. (E2) Wiarton Redmen =====
March 13	Wiarton Redmen	3 – 4	Shelburne Muskies	Shelburne

March 15	Shelburne Muskies	2 – 7	Wiarton Redmen	Wiarton

March 20	Wiarton Redmen	5 – 8	Shelburne Muskies	Shelburne

March 21	Shelburne Muskies	3 – 5	Wiarton Redmen	Wiarton

March 22	Wiarton Redmen	4 – 6	Shelburne Muskies	Shelburne

March 27	Shelburne Muskies	4 – 3	Wiarton Redmen	Wiarton

Shelburne wins series 4 – 2

===== (W3) Goderich Pirates vs. (W4) Clinton Radar =====
March 13	Goderich Pirates	3 – 6	Clinton Radar	Clinton

March 14	Clinton Radar	7 – 6	OT	Goderich Pirates	Goderich

March 20	Goderich Pirates	4 – 1	Clinton Radar	Clinton

March 22	Clinton Radar	3 – 2	Goderich Pirates	Goderich

March 27	Goderich Pirates	11 – 8	Clinton Radar	Clinton

March 29	Clinton Radar	2 – 3	OT	Goderich Pirates	Goderich

March 31	Goderich Pirates	5 – 6	Clinton Radar	Clinton

Clinton wins series 4 – 3

==== WOAA Sr. "A" Championship ====
===== (E1) Shelburne Muskies vs. (W4) Clinton Radar =====
April 3	Clinton Radar	3 – 6	Shelburne Muskies	Shelburne

April 5	Shelburne Muskies	7 – 6	2OT	Clinton Radar	Clinton

April 9	Clinton Radar	0 – 1	2OT	Shelburne Muskies	Shelburne

Shelburne wins series 3 – 0
