= 1993–94 WOAA Senior League season =

- League: WOAA Senior AA Hockey League
- Sport: Hockey
- Duration: Regular season October 1993 – January 1994; Playoffs; February 1994 – April 1994
- Teams: 19
- Finals champions: Grand Champions - Durham Thundercats; Sr. "A" Champions - Durham Thundercats; Sr. "B" Champions - Ripley Wolves

WOAA Senior League seasons
- 1992–93 1994–95

The 1993–94 WOAA Senior League season was the 4th season of the WOAA Senior AA Hockey League. The league played a regular season schedule which began in October 1993 and concluded in January 1994. The post-season began in February 1994 and concluded in April 1994.

The Durham Thundercats won the WOAA Grand Championship, defeating the Ripley Wolves in the final round.

== Team changes ==
- The Kincardine Kings folded.
- The Brussels Crusaders returned to the league and played in the Senior "A" division.
- The Elora Rocks joined the league as an expansion team and played in the Senior "A" division.
- The Lakeshore Winterhawks joined the league as an expansion team and played in the Senior "A" division.
- The Shelburne Muskies joined the league as an expansion team and played in the Senior "A" division.

== Senior "A" ==
=== Illegal player ===
The Elora Rocks were found to have an illegal player on their roster. The Rocks had a record of 12–4–4, however, as punishment, eight games in which the Rocks were 7-0-1 were instead counted as losses.

=== Final standings ===
Note: GP = Games played; W = Wins; L= Losses; OTL = Overtime losses; GF = Goals for; GA = Goals against; Pts = Points; Green shade = Clinched playoff spot

Rank	Senior "A" Standings	GP	W	L	T	Pts	GF	GA
1	Tavistock Royals	20	15	4	1	31	138	79
2	Durham Thundercats	20	14	3	3	31	131	84
3	Brussels Crusaders	20	13	5	2	28	121	99
4	Wiarton Redmen	20	11	8	1	23	112	112
5	Lakeshore Winterhawks	20	10	7	3	23	98	88
6	Drayton Comets	20	9	9	2	20	102	117
7	Arthur Tigers	20	7	10	3	17	95	101
8	Palmerston 81's	20	7	10	3	17	82	90
9	Elora Rocks	20	5	11	4	14	133	93
10	Milverton Four Wheel Drives	20	6	13	1	11	73	116
11	Shelburne Muskies	20	1	18	1	3	72	178

=== Scoring leaders ===
Note: GP = Games played; G = Goals; A = Assists; Pts = Points; PIM = Penalty minutes

Player	Team	GP	G	A	Pts	PIM
Darryl Jack	Drayton Comets	19	16	33	49	20
Terry Hoelscher	Elora Rocks	19	31	16	47	51
Mark Albrecht	Tavistock Royals	20	18	28	46	18
Jason Castellan	Elora Rocks	20	31	12	43	34
Mich Landry	Drayton Comets	18	14	29	43	8
Brad Sparkes	Elora Rocks	18	16	23	39	90
Brad Stere	Tavistock Royals	19	13	25	38	16
Bev Davidson	Wiarton Redmen	20	16	21	37	57
Jeff Neumann	Elora Rocks	18	7	30	37	94
Steve Day	Drayton Comets	20	13	23	36	27

=== Sr. "A" playoff bracket ===
Sr. "A" quarter-finals
1	Tavistock	4
8	Palmerston	3
4	Wiarton	2
5	Lakeshore	4
2	Durham	4
7	Arthur	2
3	Brussels	4
6	Drayton	1

Sr. "A" semi-finals
1	Tavistock	0
5	Lakeshore	4
2	Durham	4
3	Brussels	1

Sr. "A" finals
5	Lakeshore	2
2	Durham	4

==== WOAA Sr. "A" quarter-finals ====
===== (1) Tavistock Royals vs. (8) Palmerston 81's =====
February 7	Palmerston 81's	3 – 2	Tavistock Royals	Tavistock

February 11	Tavistock Royals	4 – 2	Palmerston 81's	Palmerston

February 14	Palmerston 81's	6 – 4	Tavistock Royals	Tavistock

February 18	Tavistock Royals	3 – 1	Palmerston 81's	Palmerston

February 19	Palmerston 81's	7 – 5	Tavistock Royals	Tavistock

February 20	Tavistock Royals	6 – 4	Palmerston 81's	Palmerston

February 21	Palmerston 81's	1 – 5	Tavistock Royals	Tavistock

Tavistock wins series 4 – 3

===== (2) Durham Thundercats vs. (7) Arthur Tigers =====
February 4	Durham Thundercats	2 – 3	Arthur Tigers	Arthur

February 9	Arthur Tigers	1 – 9	Durham Thundercats	Durham

February 11	Arthur Tigers	4 – 2	Durham Thundercats	Durham

February 12	Durham Thundercats	5 – 3	Arthur Tigers	Arthur

February 18	Arthur Tigers	5 – 8	Durham Thundercats	Durham

February 19	Durham Thundercats	5 – 1	Arthur Tigers	Arthur

Durham wins series 4 – 2

===== (3) Brussels Crusaders vs. (6) Drayton Comets =====
February 6	Drayton Comets	6 – 8	Brussels Crusaders	Brussels

February 9	Brussels Crusaders	4 – 5	OT	Drayton Comets	Drayton

February 11	Drayton Comets	1 – 2	OT	Brussels Crusaders	Brussels

February 13	Brussels Crusaders	8 – 4	Drayton Comets	Drayton

February 18	Drayton Comets	5 – 8	Brussels Crusaders	Brussels

Brussels wins series 4 – 1

===== (4) Wiarton Redmen vs. (5) Lakeshore Winterhawks =====
February 4	Wiarton Redmen	3 – 5	Lakeshore Winterhawks	Southampton

February 6	Lakeshore Winterhawks	2 – 5	Wiarton Redmen	Wiarton

February 11	Lakeshore Winterhawks	7 – 5	Wiarton Redmen	Wiarton

February 12	Wiarton Redmen	4 – 5	OT	Lakeshore Winterhawks	Southampton

February 15	Lakeshore Winterhawks	3 – 4	Wiarton Redmen	Wiarton

February 18	Wiarton Redmen	2 – 3	OT	Lakeshore Winterhawks	Southampton

Lakeshore wins series 4 – 2

==== WOAA Sr. "A" semi-finals ====
===== (1) Tavistock Royals vs. (5) Lakeshore Winterhawks =====
February 25	Lakeshore Winterhawks	7 – 3	Tavistock Royals	Tavistock

February 27	Tavistock Royals	3 – 9	Lakeshore Winterhawks	Southampton

March 6	Tavistock Royals	3 – 4	Lakeshore Winterhawks	Southampton

March 7	Lakeshore Winterhawks	6 – 4	Tavistock Royals	Tavistock

Lakeshore wins series 4 – 0

===== (2) Durham Thundercats vs. (3) Brussels Crusaders =====
February 25	Brussels Crusaders	3 – 9	Durham Thundercats	Durham

February 27	Durham Thundercats	4 – 5	Brussels Crusaders	Brussels

March 5	Brussels Crusaders	3 – 11	Durham Thundercats	Durham

March 6	Durham Thundercats	5 – 4	OT	Brussels Crusaders	Brussels

March 11	Brussels Crusaders	3 – 8	Durham Thundercats	Durham

Durham wins series 4 – 1

==== WOAA Sr. "A" Championship ====
===== (2) Durham Thundercats vs. (5) Lakeshore Winterhawks =====
March 17	Lakeshore Winterhawks	3 – 4	OT	Durham Thundercats	Durham

March 18	Durham Thundercats	7 – 3	Lakeshore Winterhawks	Southampton

March 24	Lakeshore Winterhawks	5 – 3	Durham Thundercats	Durham

March 27	Durham Thundercats	5 – 6	Lakeshore Winterhawks	Southampton

March 31	Lakeshore Winterhawks	3 – 7	Durham Thundercats	Durham

April 3	Durham Thundercats	4 – 3	Lakeshore Winterhawks	Southampton

Durham wins series 4 – 2

== Senior "B" ==
=== Illegal player ===
The Tiverton Thunder played with an illegal player and forfeited their games. The Thunder previously had a record of 9-9-2.

=== Final standings ===
Note: GP = Games played; W = Wins; L= Losses; OTL = Overtime losses; GF = Goals for; GA = Goals against; Pts = Points; Green shade = Clinched playoff spot

Rank	Senior "B" Standings	GP	W	L	T	Pts	GF	GA
1	Ripley Wolves	19	19	0	0	38	142	46
2	Grand Valley Tornadoes	19	13	4	2	28	103	75
3	Mildmay Monarchs	21	13	6	2	28	97	90
4	Dundalk Flyers	21	12	9	0	24	120	116
5	Lucknow Lancers	20	11	9	0	22	139	101
6	Lion's Head North Stars	19	6	13	0	12	68	141
7	Teeswater Falcons	21	4	17	0	8	61	193
8	Tiverton Thunder	20	0	20	0	0	135	103

=== Scoring leaders ===
Note: GP = Games played; G = Goals; A = Assists; Pts = Points; PIM = Penalty minutes

Player	Team	GP	G	A	Pts	PIM
Sean Burton	Tiverton Thunder	19	30	33	63	4
Brad Priestap	Lucknow Lancers	18	24	25	49	84
Brent Armstrong	Ripley Wolves	17	19	30	49	14
Lou Godfrey	Ripley Wolves	19	24	24	48	34
John Bujold	Tiverton Thunder	19	13	34	47	63
Chris Irwin	Lucknow Lancers	19	17	27	44	41
Bill Patterson	Ripley Wolves	17	12	29	41	6
Bevin Gregg	Tiverton Thunder	18	26	13	39	35
Kevin Stewart	Ripley Wolves	18	20	18	38	8
Dan Deaken	Grand Valley Tornadoes	19	16	21	37	62

=== Sr. "B" playoff bracket ===
Sr. "B" quarter-finals
1	Ripley	3
8	Tiverton	0
4	Dundalk	1
5	Lucknow	3
2	Grand Valley	3
7	Teeswater	0
3	Mildmay	3
6	Lion's Head	0

Sr. "B" semi-finals
1	Ripley	4
5	Lucknow	1
2	Grand Valley	4
3	Mildmay	2

Sr. "B" finals
1	Ripley	4
2	Grand Valley	0

==== WOAA Sr. "B" quarter-finals ====
===== (1) Ripley Wolves vs. (8) Teeswater Thunder =====
Note: Ripley wins series by forfeit

===== (2) Grand Valley Tornadoes vs. (7) Teeswater Falcons =====
February 6	Teeswater Falcons	5 – 7	Grand Valley Tornadoes	Grand Valley

February 11	Grand Valley Tornadoes	9 – 4	Teeswater Falcons	Teeswater

February 13	Teeswater Falcons	2 – 13	Grand Valley Tornadoes	Grand Valley

Grand Valley wins series 3 – 0

===== (3) Mildmay Monarchs vs. (6) Lion's Head North Stars =====
February 11	Mildmay Monarchs	6 – 2	Lion's Head North Stars	Lion's Head

February 13	Lion's Head North Stars	6 – 7	Mildmay Monarchs	Mildmay

February 18	Lion's Head North Stars	3 – 7	Mildmay Monarchs	Mildmay

Mildmay wins series 3 – 0

===== (4) Dundalk Flyers vs. (5) Lucknow Lancers =====
February 5	Lucknow Lancers	10 – 6	Dundalk Flyers	Dundalk

February 6	Dundalk Flyers	5 – 4	Lucknow Lancers	Lucknow

February 11	Lucknow Lancers	11 – 3	Dundalk Flyers	Dundalk

February 13	Dundalk Flyers	6 – 8	Lucknow Lancers	Lucknow

Lucknow wins series 3 – 1

==== WOAA Sr. "B" semi-finals ====
===== (1) Ripley Wolves vs. (5) Lucknow Lancers =====
February 25	Lucknow Lancers	6 – 4	Ripley Wolves	Ripley

February 27	Ripley Wolves	5 – 2	Lucknow Lancers	Lucknow

March 4	Lucknow Lancers	4 – 6	Ripley Wolves	Ripley

March 6	Ripley Wolves	4 – 2	Lucknow Lancers	Lucknow

March 11	Lucknow Lancers	3 – 6	Ripley Wolves	Ripley

Ripley wins series 4 – 1

===== (2) Grand Valley Tornadoes vs. (3) Mildmay Monarchs =====
February 26	Mildmay Monarchs	8 – 3	Grand Valley Tornadoes	Grand Valley

February 27	Grand Valley Tornadoes	7 – 3	Mildmay Monarchs	Mildmay

March 5	Mildmay Monarchs	1 – 9	Grand Valley Tornadoes	Grand Valley

March 6	Grand Valley Tornadoes	7 – 3	Mildmay Monarchs	Mildmay

March 11	Mildmay Monarchs	6 – 2	Grand Valley Tornadoes	Grand Valley

March 13	Grand Valley Tornadoes	8 – 3	Mildmay Monarchs	Mildmay

Grand Valley wins series 4 – 2

==== WOAA Sr. "B" Championship ====
===== (1) Ripley Wolves vs. (2) Grand Valley Tornadoes =====
Note: Game three was played in Kincardine, Ontario.

March 18	Grand Valley Tornadoes	3 – 6	Ripley Wolves	Ripley

March 20	Ripley Wolves	6 – 2	Grand Valley Tornadoes	Grand Valley

March 26	Grand Valley Tornadoes	0 – 4	Ripley Wolves	Ripley

March 27	Ripley Wolves	10 – 2	Grand Valley Tornadoes	Grand Valley

Ripley wins series 4 – 0

== Grand championship ==
The Durham Thundercats and Ripley Wolves faced off in a best-of-five series to determine the Grand Champions of the league. Ripley announced that they would play their home games in Kincardine, Ontario in this series.

Durham swept the series in three games.

=== (A1) Durham Thundercats vs. (B1) Ripley Wolves ===
April 7	Ripley Wolves	3 – 6	Durham Thundercats	Durham

April 10	Durham Thundercats	7 – 6	OT	Ripley Wolves	Kincardine

April 16	Ripley Wolves	0 – 3	Durham Thundercats	Durham

Durham wins series 3 – 0
