= 1996–97 WOAA Senior League season =

- League: WOAA Senior AA Hockey League
- Sport: Hockey
- Duration: Regular season October 1996 – February 1997; Playoffs; February 1997 – April 1997
- Teams: 19
- Finals champions: Sr. "AA" Champions - Durham Thundercats; Sr. "A" Champions - Goderich Pirates; Sr. "B" Champions - Lucknow Lancers

WOAA Senior League seasons
- 1995–96 1997–98

The 1996–97 WOAA Senior League season was the 7th season of the WOAA Senior AA Hockey League. The league played a regular season schedule which began in October 1996 and concluded in February 1997. The post-season began in February 1997 and concluded in April 1997.

The Durham Thundercats won the Sr. "AA" championship, defeating the Wellesley Merchants in six games. The Goderich Pirates won the Sr. "A" championship and the Lucknow Lancers won the Sr. "B" championship.

== Team changes ==
- The Lakeshore Winterhawks fold.
- The Shelburne Muskies moved from the Senior "AA" division to Senior "A".
- The Goderich Pirates join the league as an expansion team and will play in the Senior "A" division.

== Senior "AA" ==
=== Final standings ===
Note: GP = Games played; W = Wins; L= Losses; OTL = Overtime losses; GF = Goals for; GA = Goals against; Pts = Points; Green shade = Clinched "AA" playoff spot

| Rank | Senior "AA" Standings | GP | W | L | T | OTL | Pts | GF | GA |
|---|---|---|---|---|---|---|---|---|---|
| 1 | Wellesley Merchants | 24 | 16 | 6 | 1 | 1 | 34 | 127 | 99 |
| 2 | Durham Thundercats | 24 | 15 | 7 | 1 | 1 | 32 | 143 | 105 |
| 3 | Tavistock Royals | 24 | 14 | 9 | 0 | 1 | 29 | 123 | 107 |
| 4 | Milverton Four Wheel Drives | 24 | 10 | 12 | 0 | 2 | 22 | 87 | 105 |
| 5 | Elora Rocks | 24 | 4 | 18 | 0 | 2 | 10 | 85 | 149 |

=== Scoring leaders ===
Note: GP = Games played; G = Goals; A = Assists; Pts = Points; PIM = Penalty minutes

| Player | Team | GP | G | A | Pts | PIM |
|---|---|---|---|---|---|---|
| Darren Snyder | Wellesley Merchants | 22 | 31 | 29 | 60 | 14 |
| Jason Mervyn | Wellesley Merchants | 16 | 24 | 21 | 45 | 31 |
| Dean Huber | Wellesley Merchants | 20 | 12 | 31 | 43 | 2 |
| Greg Snyder | Tavistock Royals | 24 | 23 | 14 | 37 | 39 |
| Todd Stoddart | Durham Thundercats | 21 | 16 | 19 | 35 | 30 |
| Terry Hoelscher | Elora Rocks | 23 | 18 | 15 | 33 | 18 |
| Keith MacMillan | Durham Thundercats | 17 | 13 | 20 | 33 | 18 |
| Randy Coverdale | Elora Rocks | 22 | 12 | 21 | 33 | 52 |
| Joe Scherer | Tavistock Royals | 14 | 15 | 17 | 32 | 8 |
| Rob LeBlanc | Durham Thundercats | 18 | 14 | 17 | 31 | 78 |

=== Sr. "AA" playoff bracket ===
Sr. "AA" preliminary
1 | Wellesley | bye
4 | Milverton | 3
5 | Elora | 2
2 | Durham | bye
3 | Tavistock | bye

Sr. "AA" semi-finals
1 | Wellesley | 4
4 | Milverton | 1
2 | Durham | 4
3 | Tavistock | 1

Sr. "AA" finals
1 | Wellesley | 2
2 | Durham | 4

==== WOAA Sr. "AA" preliminary round ====
===== (4) Milverton Four Wheel Drives vs. (5) Elora Rocks =====
| February 14 | Milverton Four Wheel Drives | 6 – 4 | Elora Rocks | Elora |

| February 15 | Elora Rocks | 2 – 3 | Milverton Four Wheel Drives | Milverton |

| February 18 | Elora Rocks | 5 – 4 | OT | Milverton Four Wheel Drives | Milverton |

| February 23 | Milverton Four Wheel Drives | 1 – 3 | Elora Rocks | Elora |

| February 25 | Elora Rocks | 1 – 8 | Milverton Four Wheel Drives | Milverton |

| Milverton wins series 3 – 2 |

==== WOAA Sr. "AA" semi-finals ====
===== (1) Wellesley Merchants vs. (4) Milverton Four Wheel Drives =====
| March 1 | Milverton Four Wheel Drives | 1 – 2 | OT | Wellesley Merchants | Wellesley |

| March 4 | Milverton Four Wheel Drives | 4 – 3 | OT | Wellesley Merchants | Wellesley |

| March 7 | Wellesley Merchants | 0 – 3 | Milverton Four Wheel Drives | Milverton |

| March 8 | Milverton Four Wheel Drives | 3 – 4 | Wellesley Merchants | Wellesley |

| March 14 | Milverton Four Wheel Drives | 2 – 3 | 2OT | Wellesley Merchants | Wellesley |

| Wellesley wins series 4 – 1 |

===== (2) Durham Thundercats vs. (3) Tavistock Royals =====
| February 21 | Tavistock Royals | 7 – 1 | Durham Thundercats | Durham |

| February 22 | Durham Thundercats | 4 – 3 | Tavistock Royals | Tavistock |

| February 28 | Tavistock Royals | 3 – 4 | OT | Durham Thundercats | Durham |

| March 1 | Durham Thundercats | 6 – 3 | Tavistock Royals | Tavistock |

| March 7 | Tavistock Royals | 5 – 9 | Durham Thundercats | Durham |

| Durham wins series 4 – 1 |

==== WOAA Sr. "AA" Championship ====
===== (1) Wellesley Merchants vs. (2) Durham Thundercats =====
| March 21 | Durham Thundercats | 5 – 3 | Wellesley Merchants | Wellesley |

| March 23 | Durham Thundercats | 3 – 7 | Wellesley Merchants | Wellesley |

| March 28 | Wellesley Merchants | 2 – 5 | Durham Thundercats | Durham |

| March 29 | Wellesley Merchants | 4 – 7 | Durham Thundercats | Durham |

| April 4 | Durham Thundercats | 2 – 3 | Wellesley Merchants | Wellesley |

| April 5 | Wellesley Merchants | 4 – 6 | Durham Thundercats | Durham |

| Durham wins series 4 – 2 |

== Senior "A" ==
=== Final standings ===
Note: GP = Games played; W = Wins; L= Losses; OTL = Overtime losses; GF = Goals for; GA = Goals against; Pts = Points; Green shade = Clinched "A" playoff spot

| Rank | Senior "A" Standings | GP | W | L | T | OTL | Pts | GF | GA |
|---|---|---|---|---|---|---|---|---|---|
| 1 | Shelburne Muskies | 22 | 17 | 4 | 0 | 1 | 35 | 164 | 102 |
| 2 | Wiarton Redmen | 24 | 16 | 8 | 0 | 0 | 32 | 155 | 116 |
| 3 | Goderich Pirates | 24 | 15 | 9 | 0 | 0 | 30 | 129 | 115 |
| 4 | Palmerston 81's | 24 | 13 | 9 | 1 | 1 | 28 | 146 | 124 |
| 5 | Ripley Wolves | 23 | 13 | 9 | 0 | 1 | 27 | 111 | 104 |
| 6 | Arthur Tigers | 24 | 12 | 11 | 1 | 0 | 25 | 159 | 151 |
| 7 | Brussels Crusaders | 24 | 9 | 13 | 2 | 0 | 17 | 112 | 121 |
| 8 | Clinton Radar | 24 | 5 | 13 | 2 | 1 | 13 | 98 | 150 |
| 9 | Drayton Comets | 24 | 2 | 22 | 0 | 0 | 4 | 82 | 166 |

=== Scoring leaders ===
Note: GP = Games played; G = Goals; A = Assists; Pts = Points; PIM = Penalty minutes

| Player | Team | GP | G | A | Pts | PIM |
|---|---|---|---|---|---|---|
| Tim Harrison | Goderich Pirates | 23 | 35 | 26 | 61 | 45 |
| Kevin Greco | Shelburne Muskies | 21 | 21 | 39 | 60 | 12 |
| Keith Davis | Shelburne Muskies | 20 | 32 | 23 | 55 | 94 |
| Scott Vader | Palmerston 81's | 20 | 24 | 29 | 53 | 42 |
| Ryan Thompson | Wiarton Redmen | 20 | 26 | 20 | 46 | 2 |
| Don Richardson | Wiarton Redmen | 24 | 14 | 29 | 43 | 39 |
| Jason Hackett | Shelburne Muskies | 21 | 16 | 26 | 42 | 96 |
| Darryl Durnin | Goderich Pirates | 23 | 16 | 25 | 41 | 35 |
| Tom McDonald | Brussels Crusaders | 24 | 21 | 19 | 40 | 9 |
| Greg McNevan | Drayton Comets | 22 | 22 | 17 | 39 | 60 |

=== Sr. "A" playoff bracket ===
Sr. "A" preliminary round
1 | Shelburne | 4
8 | Clinton | 2
4 | Palmerston | 2
5 | Ripley | 4
2 | Wiarton | 4
7 | Brussels | 0
3 | Goderich | 4
6 | Arthur | 3

Sr. "A" semi-finals
1 | Shelburne | 3
5 | Ripley | 4
2 | Wiarton | 3
3 | Goderich | 4

Sr. "A" finals
5 | Ripley | 3
3 | Goderich | 4

==== WOAA Sr. "A" quarter-finals ====
===== (1) Shelburne Muskies vs. (8) Clinton Radar =====
| February 15 | Clinton Radar | 3 – 6 | Shelburne Muskies | Shelburne |

| February 21 | Shelburne Muskies | 7 – 3 | Clinton Radar | Clinton |

| February 22 | Clinton Radar | 5 – 3 | Shelburne Muskies | Shelburne |

| February 28 | Shelburne Muskies | 4 – 3 | OT | Clinton Radar | Clinton |

| March 1 | Clinton Radar | 6 – 4 | Shelburne Muskies | Shelburne |

| March 2 | Shelburne Muskies | 7 – 1 | Clinton Radar | Clinton |

| Shelburne wins series 4 – 2 |

===== (2) Wiarton Redmen vs. (7) Brussels Crusaders =====
| February 14 | Brussels Crusaders | 1 – 6 | Wiarton Redmen | Wiarton |

| February 15 | Wiarton Redmen | 4 – 3 | Brussels Crusaders | Brussels |

| February 21 | Brussels Crusaders | 1 – 9 | Wiarton Redmen | Wiarton |

| February 22 | Wiarton Redmen | 3 – 2 | Brussels Crusaders | Brussels |

| Wiarton wins series 4 – 0 |

===== (3) Goderich Pirates vs. (6) Arthur Tigers =====
| February 15 | Goderich Pirates | 2 – 5 | Arthur Tigers | Arthur |

| February 16 | Arthur Tigers | 2 – 6 | Goderich Pirates | Goderich |

| February 21 | Arthur Tigers | 5 – 6 | OT | Goderich Pirates | Goderich |

| February 22 | Goderich Pirates | 1 – 5 | Arthur Tigers | Arthur |

| February 28 | Arthur Tigers | 2 – 7 | Goderich Pirates | Goderich |

| March 1 | Goderich Pirates | 2 – 7 | Arthur Tigers | Arthur |

| March 2 | Arthur Tigers | 2 – 5 | Goderich Pirates | Goderich |

| Goderich wins series 4 – 3 |

===== (4) Palmerston 81's vs. (5) Ripley Wolves =====
Note: Games three and five were played in Harriston, Ontario.

| February 14 | Ripley Wolves | 5 – 4 | OT | Palmerston 81's | Palmerston |

| February 15 | Palmerston 81's | 3 – 7 | Ripley Wolves | Ripley |

| February 21 | Ripley Wolves | 5 – 2 | Palmerston 81's | Palmerston |

| February 23 | Palmerston 81's | 8 – 6 | Ripley Wolves | Ripley |

| February 28 | Ripley Wolves | 4 – 8 | Palmerston 81's | Palmerston |

| March 1 | Palmerston 81's | 3 – 4 | Ripley Wolves | Ripley |

| Ripley wins series 4 – 2 |

==== WOAA Sr. "A" semi-finals ====
===== (1) Shelburne Muskies vs. (5) Ripley Wolves =====
| March 8 | Ripley Wolves | 4 – 9 | Shelburne Muskies | Shelburne |

| March 9 | Shelburne Muskies | 6 – 5 | OT | Ripley Wolves | Ripley |

| March 14 | Ripley Wolves | 8 – 7 | Shelburne Muskies | Shelburne |

| March 16 | Shelburne Muskies | 3 – 4 | OT | Ripley Wolves | Ripley |

| March 21 | Ripley Wolves | 4 – 3 | Shelburne Muskies | Shelburne |

| March 22 | Shelburne Muskies | 5 – 3 | Ripley Wolves | Ripley |

| March 23 | Ripley Wolves | 6 – 3 | Shelburne Muskies | Shelburne |

| Ripley wins series 4 – 3 |

===== (2) Wiarton Redmen vs. (3) Goderich Pirates =====
| March 9 | Goderich Pirates | 6 – 7 | Wiarton Redmen | Wiarton |

| March 13 | Wiarton Redmen | 3 – 4 | Goderich Pirates | Goderich |

| March 14 | Goderich Pirates | 3 – 9 | Wiarton Redmen | Wiarton |

| March 16 | Wiarton Redmen | 0 – 4 | Goderich Pirates | Goderich |

| March 21 | Goderich Pirates | 7 – 8 | Wiarton Redmen | Wiarton |

| March 23 | Wiarton Redmen | 6 – 7 | Goderich Pirates | Goderich |

| March 25 | Goderich Pirates | 5 – 3 | Wiarton Redmen | Wiarton |

| Goderich wins series 4 – 3 |

==== WOAA Sr. "A" Championship ====
===== (3) Goderich Pirates vs. (5) Ripley Wolves =====
| March 27 | Ripley Wolves | 7 – 4 | Goderich Pirates | Goderich |

| March 29 | Goderich Pirates | 5 – 4 | Ripley Wolves | Ripley |

| April 4 | Ripley Wolves | 4 – 8 | Goderich Pirates | Goderich |

| April 6 | Goderich Pirates | 2 – 3 | OT | Ripley Wolves | Ripley |

| April 11 | Ripley Wolves | 4 – 3 | OT | Goderich Pirates | Goderich |

| April 12 | Goderich Pirates | 5 – 4 | Ripley Wolves | Ripley |

| April 13 | Ripley Wolves | 2 – 3 | Goderich Pirates | Goderich |

| Goderich wins series 4 – 3 |

== Senior "B" ==
=== Final standings ===
Note: GP = Games played; W = Wins; L= Losses; OTL = Overtime losses; GF = Goals for; GA = Goals against; Pts = Points; Green shade = Clinched "B" playoff spot

| Rank | Senior "B" Standings | GP | W | L | T | OTL | Pts | GF | GA |
|---|---|---|---|---|---|---|---|---|---|
| 1 | Dundalk Flyers | 24 | 19 | 5 | 0 | 0 | 38 | 160 | 93 |
| 2 | Lucknow Lancers | 24 | 18 | 5 | 0 | 1 | 37 | 157 | 91 |
| 3 | Mildmay Monarchs | 23 | 12 | 7 | 2 | 2 | 28 | 102 | 92 |
| 4 | Teeswater Falcons | 24 | 4 | 18 | 1 | 1 | 10 | 88 | 186 |
| 5 | Grand Valley Tornadoes | 23 | 4 | 18 | 1 | 0 | 9 | 108 | 153 |

=== Scoring leaders ===
Note: GP = Games played; G = Goals; A = Assists; Pts = Points; PIM = Penalty minutes

| Player | Team | GP | G | A | Pts | PIM |
|---|---|---|---|---|---|---|
| Brad Priestap | Lucknow Lancers | 22 | 19 | 32 | 51 | 61 |
| Justin Murray | Lucknow Lancers | 21 | 26 | 24 | 50 | 37 |
| Dave Vanalstine | Dundalk Flyers | 21 | 21 | 22 | 43 | 21 |
| Kyle Wheeler | Lucknow Lancers | 21 | 18 | 25 | 43 | 25 |
| Todd Davis | Dundalk Flyers | 19 | 20 | 19 | 39 | 74 |
| Lou Bellwood | Dundalk Flyers | 20 | 16 | 23 | 39 | 32 |
| Troy Fischer | Teeswater Falcons | 23 | 20 | 17 | 37 | 55 |
| Brad Murray | Lucknow Lancers | 20 | 12 | 25 | 37 | 47 |
| Shawn Miller | Dundalk Flyers | 17 | 24 | 11 | 35 | 59 |
| Greg Bratton | Grand Valley Tornadoes | 20 | 8 | 27 | 35 | 33 |

=== Sr. "B" playoff bracket ===
Sr. "B" preliminary round
1 | Dundalk | bye
4 | Teeswater | 2
5 | Grand Valley | 1
2 | Lucknow | bye
3 | Mildmay | bye

Sr. "B" semi-finals
1 | Dundalk | 3
4 | Teeswater | 0
2 | Lucknow | 4
3 | Mildmay | 0

Sr. "B" finals
1 | Dundalk | 1
2 | Lucknow | 4

==== WOAA Sr. "B" preliminary round ====
===== (4) Teeswater Falcons vs. (5) Grand Valley Tornadoes =====
| February 14 | Grand Valley Tornadoes | 5 – 10 | Teeswater Falcons | Teeswater |

| February 15 | Teeswater Falcons | 4 – 5 | OT | Grand Valley Tornadoes | Grand Valley |

| February 16 | Grand Valley Tornadoes | 2 – 5 | Teeswater Falcons | Teeswater |

| Teeswater wins series 2 – 1 |

==== WOAA Sr. "B" semi-finals ====
===== (1) Dundalk Flyers vs. (4) Teeswater Falcons =====
| February 23 | Dundalk Flyers | 4 – 2 | Teeswater Falcons | Teeswater |

| March 2 | Dundalk Flyers | 7 – 5 | Teeswater Falcons | Teeswater |

| March 5 | Teeswater Falcons | 1 – 14 | Dundalk Flyers | Dundalk |

| Dundalk wins series 3 – 0 |

===== (2) Lucknow Lancers vs. (3) Mildmay Monarchs =====
| February 21 | Mildmay Monarchs | 2 – 3 | Lucknow Lancers | Lucknow |

| February 23 | Lucknow Lancers | 7 – 4 | Mildmay Monarchs | Mildmay |

| February 28 | Mildmay Monarchs | 0 – 6 | Lucknow Lancers | Lucknow |

| March 2 | Lucknow Lancers | 7 – 2 | Mildmay Monarchs | Mildmay |

| Lucknow wins series 4 – 0 |

==== WOAA Sr. "B" Championship ====
===== (1) Dundalk Flyers vs. (2) Lucknow Lancers =====
| March 16 | Dundalk Flyers | 4 – 3 | Lucknow Lancers | Lucknow |

| March 22 | Lucknow Lancers | 3 – 1 | Dundalk Flyers | Dundalk |

| March 23 | Dundalk Flyers | 4 – 5 | Lucknow Lancers | Lucknow |

| March 27 | Lucknow Lancers | 7 – 4 | Dundalk Flyers | Dundalk |

| March 28 | Lucknow Lancers | 5 – 2 | Dundalk Flyers | Dundalk |

| Lucknow wins series 4 – 1 |
