= 1998–99 WOAA Senior League season =

- League: WOAA Senior AA Hockey League
- Sport: Hockey
- Duration: Regular season October 1998 – February 1999; Playoffs; February 1999 – April 1999
- Teams: 15
- Finals champions: Sr. "AA" Champions - Milverton Four Wheel Drives; Sr. "A" Champions - Palmerston 81's

WOAA Senior League seasons
- 1997–98 1999–00

The 1998–99 WOAA Senior League season was the 9th season of the WOAA Senior AA Hockey League. The league played a regular season schedule which began in October 1998 and concluded in February 1999. The post-season began in February 1999 and concluded in April 1999.

The Milverton Four Wheel Drives won the Sr. "AA" championship, defeating the Durham Thundercats in six games. The Palmerston 81's won the Sr. "A" championship.

== Team changes ==
- The Ripley Wolves took a leave of absence.
- The Tavistock Royals took a leave of absence.
- The Monkton Wildcats returned to the league and joined the Sr. "A" West Division.
- The Hensall Sherwoods joined the league as an expansion team in the Sr. "A" West Division.
- The Mildmay Monarchs moved from the Sr. "A" West Division to the Sr. "A" East Division.

== Senior "AA" ==
=== Final standings ===
Note: GP = Games played; W = Wins; L= Losses; OTL = Overtime losses; GF = Goals for; GA = Goals against; Pts = Points; Green shade = Clinched "AA" playoff spot

Rank	Senior "AA" Standings	GP	W	L	T	OTL	Pts	GF	GA
1	Milverton Four Wheel Drives	24	19	2	3	0	41	135	69
2	Durham Thundercats	24	18	4	2	0	38	139	78
3	Wellesley Merchants	24	12	7	5	0	29	116	98
4	Elora Rocks	24	6	13	4	1	17	91	138

=== Scoring leaders ===
Note: GP = Games played; G = Goals; A = Assists; Pts = Points; PIM = Penalty minutes

Player	Team	GP	G	A	Pts	PIM
Keith MacMillan	Durham Thundercats	23	18	29	47	10
Kory Dietz	Milverton Four Wheel Drives	22	25	16	41	34
Bill Evans	Wellesley Merchants	24	12	28	40	20
Dan Neil	Durham Thundercats	20	16	23	39	81
Greg Buder	Wellesley Merchants	22	19	19	38	62
Jeremy Franks	Durham Thundercats	23	13	22	35	18
Chip Seiling	Wellesley Merchants	23	7	21	28	26
Bill Spielmacher	Durham Thundercats	17	13	14	27	70
Jeff Rahn	Durham Thundercats	21	12	14	26	85
Chad Beaupre	Wellesley Merchants	22	11	14	25	78

=== Sr. "AA" playoff bracket ===
Sr. "AA" semi-finals
1	Milverton	4
4	Elora	1
2	Durham	4
3	Wellesley	1

Sr. "AA" finals
1	Milverton	4
2	Durham	2

==== WOAA Sr. "AA" semi-finals ====
===== (1) Milverton Four Wheel Drives vs. (4) Elora Rocks =====
February 19	Milverton Four Wheel Drives	7 – 6	OT	Elora Rocks	Elora

February 20	Elora Rocks	2 – 8	Milverton Four Wheel Drives	Milverton

February 27	Elora Rocks	3 – 4	Milverton Four Wheel Drives	Milverton

February 28	Milverton Four Wheel Drives	5 – 6	OT	Elora Rocks	Elora

March 5	Elora Rocks	1 – 5	Milverton Four Wheel Drives	Milverton

Milverton wins series 4 – 1

===== (2) Durham Thundercats vs. (3) Wellesley Merchants =====
February 19	Wellesley Merchants	3 – 5	Durham Thundercats	Durham

February 20	Durham Thundercats	5 – 4	Wellesley Merchants	Wellesley

February 26	Wellesley Merchants	3 – 1	Durham Thundercats	Durham

February 28	Durham Thundercats	3 – 1	Wellesley Merchants	Wellesley

March 5	Wellesley Merchants	4 – 5	Durham Thundercats	Durham

Durham wins series 4 – 1

==== WOAA Sr. "AA" Championship ====
===== (1) Milverton Four Wheel Drives vs. (2) Durham Thundercats =====
March 13	Durham Thundercats	6 – 3	Milverton Four Wheel Drives	Milverton

March 19	Milverton Four Wheel Drives	5 – 8	Durham Thundercats	Durham

March 20	Durham Thundercats	6 – 9	Milverton Four Wheel Drives	Milverton

March 26	Milverton Four Wheel Drives	3 – 2	Durham Thundercats	Durham

March 27	Durham Thundercats	1 – 3	Milverton Four Wheel Drives	Milverton

April 2	Milverton Four Wheel Drives	5 – 2	Durham Thundercats	Durham

Milverton wins series 4 – 2

== Senior "A" ==
=== Final standings ===
Note: GP = Games played; W = Wins; L= Losses; OTL = Overtime losses; GF = Goals for; GA = Goals against; Pts = Points; Green shade = Clinched "A" playoff spot

Rank	East Division	GP	W	L	T	OTL	Pts	GF	GA
1	Palmerston 81's	24	17	5	0	2	36	118	70
2	Shelburne Muskies	24	15	8	0	1	31	119	108
3	Wiarton Redmen	24	11	13	0	0	22	114	107
4	Mildmay Monarchs	23	8	14	0	1	17	83	113
5	Arthur Tigers	23	7	14	2	0	16	114	141
6	Dundalk Flyers	24	5	15	2	2	14	71	114

Rank	West Division	GP	W	L	T	OTL	Pts	GF	GA
1	Goderich Pirates	24	15	8	1	0	31	136	110
2	Lucknow Lancers	24	13	10	1	0	27	124	95
3	Clinton Radar	24	10	12	2	0	22	86	99
4	Hensall Sherwoods	24	7	15	2	0	14	106	141
5	Monkton Wildcats	24	3	20	0	1	7	75	146

=== Scoring leaders ===
Note: GP = Games played; G = Goals; A = Assists; Pts = Points; PIM = Penalty minutes

Player	Team	GP	G	A	Pts	PIM
Ray Buttineau	Goderich Pirates	21	21	25	46	28
Darryll Hancock	Arthur Tigers	21	18	24	42	41
Sean Burton	Goderich Pirates	21	25	15	40	0
Tim Harrison	Goderich Pirates	19	18	22	40	38
Dave Ritchie	Shelburne Muskies	22	21	18	39	30
Darryl Rooney	Arthur Tigers	23	17	22	39	32
Bryan Long	Arthur Tigers	20	23	13	36	74
Keith Davis	Shelburne Muskies	17	24	11	35	109
Kyle Wheeler	Lucknow Lancers	21	16	17	33	20
Scott Bridge	Wiarton Redmen	19	7	25	32	32

=== Sr. "A" playoff bracket ===
Preliminary round
E1	Palmerston	bye
E4	Mildmay	0
E5	Arthur	2
E2	Shelburne	bye
E3	Wiarton	2
E6	Dundalk	1
W1	Goderich	bye
W4	Hensall	2
W5	Monkton	0
W2	Lucknow	bye
W3	Clinton	bye

Division semi-finals
E1	Palmerston	4
E5	Arthur	1
E2	Shelburne	4
E3	Wiarton	2
W1	Goderich	4
W4	Hensall	0
W2	Lucknow	3
W3	Clinton	4

Division finals
E1	Palmerston	4
E2	Shelburne	3
W1	Goderich	2
W3	Clinton	4

Sr. "A" finals
E1	Palmerston	4
W3	Clinton	2

==== WOAA Sr. "A" preliminary round ====
===== (E3) Wiarton Redmen vs. (E6) Dundalk Flyers =====
February 5	Dundalk Flyers	5 – 7	Wiarton Redmen	Wiarton

February 6	Wiarton Redmen	6 – 7	Dundalk Flyers	Dundalk

February 7	Dundalk Flyers	1 – 5	Wiarton Redmen	Wiarton

Wiarton wins series 2 – 1

===== (E4) Mildmay Monarchs vs. (E5) Arthur Tigers =====
February 5	Arthur Tigers	6 – 2	Mildmay Monarchs	Mildmay

February 6	Mildmay Monarchs	5 – 6	OT	Arthur Tigers	Arthur

Arthur wins series 2 – 0

===== (W4) Hensall Sherwoods vs. (W5) Monkton Wildcats =====
February 6	Monkton Wildcats	2 – 3	OT	Hensall Sherwoods	Hensall

February 7	Hensall Sherwoods	4 – 3	OT	Monkton Wildcats	Monkton

Hensall wins series 2 – 0

==== WOAA Sr. "A" divisional semi-finals ====
===== (E1) Palmerston 81's vs. (E5) Arthur Tigers =====
Note: Game five was played in Harriston, Ontario.

February 12	Arthur Tigers	2 – 3	Palmerston 81's	Palmerston

February 13	Palmerston 81's	4 – 1	Arthur Tigers	Arthur

February 19	Arthur Tigers	7 – 5	Palmerston 81's	Palmerston

February 20	Palmerston 81's	5 – 3	Arthur Tigers	Arthur

February 26	Arthur Tigers	1 – 3	Palmerston 81's	Palmerston

Palmerston wins series 4 – 1

===== (E2) Shelburne Muskies vs. (E3) Wiarton Redmen =====
February 14	Wiarton Redmen	6 – 4	Shelburne Muskies	Shelburne

February 19	Shelburne Muskies	4 – 3	Wiarton Redmen	Wiarton

February 20	Wiarton Redmen	2 – 6	Shelburne Muskies	Shelburne

February 21	Shelburne Muskies	3 – 6	Wiarton Redmen	Wiarton

February 23	Wiarton Redmen	3 – 7	Shelburne Muskies	Shelburne

February 26	Shelburne Muskies	6 – 2	Wiarton Redmen	Wiarton

Shelburne wins series 4 – 2

===== (W1) Goderich Pirates vs. (W4) Hensall Sherwoods =====
February 12	Hensall Sherwoods	5 – 6	Goderich Pirates	Goderich

February 14	Hensall Sherwoods	6 – 4	Goderich Pirates	Goderich

February 18	Hensall Sherwoods	6 – 8	Goderich Pirates	Goderich

February 21	Goderich Pirates	5 – 4	Hensall Sherwoods	Hensall

Goderich wins series 4 – 0

===== (W2) Lucknow Lancers vs. (W3) Clinton Radar =====
February 12	Clinton Radar	1 – 4	Lucknow Lancers	Lucknow

February 14	Lucknow Lancers	2 – 5	Clinton Radar	Clinton

February 19	Clinton Radar	3 – 4	Lucknow Lancers	Lucknow

February 20	Lucknow Lancers	1 – 5	Clinton Radar	Clinton

February 26	Clinton Radar	5 – 6	Lucknow Lancers	Lucknow

February 27	Lucknow Lancers	3 – 5	Clinton Radar	Clinton

February 28	Clinton Radar	5 – 2	Lucknow Lancers	Lucknow

Clinton wins series 4 – 3

==== WOAA Sr. "A" divisional finals ====
===== (E1) Palmerston 81's vs. (E2) Shelburne Muskies =====
Note: Game one was played in Harriston, Ontario.

March 5	Shelburne Muskies	7 – 5	Palmerston 81's	Palmerston

March 6	Palmerston 81's	5 – 3	Shelburne Muskies	Shelburne

March 9	Shelburne Muskies	4 – 5	Palmerston 81's	Palmerston

March 13	Palmerston 81's	4 – 5	OT	Shelburne Muskies	Shelburne

March 19	Shelburne Muskies	10 – 6	Palmerston 81's	Palmerston

March 20	Palmerston 81's	6 – 4	Shelburne Muskies	Shelburne

March 23	Shelburne Muskies	3 – 4	OT	Palmerston 81's	Palmerston

Palmerston wins series 4 – 3

===== (W1) Goderich Pirates vs. (W3) Clinton Radar =====
Note: Goderich home games were played in Ripley, Ontario.

March 6	Clinton Radar	3 – 2	OT	Goderich Pirates	Ripley

March 7	Goderich Pirates	2 – 5	Clinton Radar	Clinton

March 12	Clinton Radar	4 – 7	Goderich Pirates	Ripley

March 13	Goderich Pirates	1 – 7	Clinton Radar	Clinton

March 19	Clinton Radar	1 – 2	OT	Goderich Pirates	Ripley

March 20	Goderich Pirates	3 – 4	OT	Clinton Radar	Clinton

Clinton wins series 4 – 2

==== WOAA Sr. "A" Championship ====
===== (E1) Palmerston 81's vs. (W3) Clinton Radar =====
March 26	Clinton Radar	1 – 2	Palmerston 81's	Palmerston

March 28	Palmerston 81's	6 – 5	Clinton Radar	Clinton

April 1	Clinton Radar	2 – 6	Palmerston 81's	Palmerston

April 3	Palmerston 81's	5 – 6	Clinton Radar	Clinton

April 4	Clinton Radar	3 – 2	Palmerston 81's	Palmerston

April 9	Palmerston 81's	3 – 0	Clinton Radar	Clinton

Palmerston wins series 4 – 2
