= 1990–91 WOAA Senior League season =

- League: WOAA Senior AA Hockey League
- Sport: Hockey
- Duration: Regular season October 1990 – February 1991; Playoffs; February 1991 – April 1991
- Teams: 17
- Finals champions: Grand Champions - Arthur Tigers; Sr. A Champions - Durham Thundercats; Sr. B Champions - Arthur Tigers; Sr. C Champions - Drayton Comets

WOAA Senior League seasons
- 1989–90 1991–92

The 1990–91 WOAA Senior League season was the 1st season of the WOAA Senior AA Hockey League. The league played a 24-game regular season which began in October 1990 and concluded in February 1991. The post-season began in February 1991 and concluded in April 1991.

The Arthur Tigers won the WOAA Grand Championship, defeating the Durham Thundercats in the final round of the playoffs.

== Regular season ==
=== Final standings ===
Note: GP = Games played; W = Wins; L= Losses; OTL = Overtime losses; GF = Goals for; GA = Goals against; Pts = Points; Green shade = Clinched playoff spot

Rank	North Division	GP	W	L	T	Pts	GF	GA
1	Durham Thundercats	23	20	2	1	44	220	91
2	Kincardine Kings	24	17	3	4	38	195	117
3	Wiarton Redmen	24	12	7	5	29	156	143
4	Ripley Wolves	24	10	12	2	22	129	135
5	Dundalk Flyers	23	7	12	4	18	113	134
6	Teeswater Falcons	23	5	13	5	15	98	165
7	Lucknow Lancers	24	5	14	5	15	139	189
8	Lion's Head North Stars	24	3	16	4	10	106	182

Rank	South Division	GP	W	L	T	Pts	GF	GA
1	Palmerston 81's	24	18	2	4	40	168	98
2	Tavistock Royals	23	15	4	4	34	136	88
3	Wellesley Merchants	24	12	10	2	26	134	108
4	Arthur Tigers	24	11	9	4	26	151	126
5	Drayton Comets	23	12	10	1	25	164	146
6	Brussels Crusaders	23	11	10	2	24	148	121
7	Milverton Four Wheel Drives	24	8	14	2	18	143	140
8	Grand Valley Tornado	24	6	16	2	14	137	165
9	Monkton Wildcats	23	2	20	1	5	64	233

=== Scoring leaders ===
Note: GP = Games played; G = Goals; A = Assists; Pts = Points; PIM = Penalty minutes

Player	Team	GP	G	A	Pts	PIM
Sean Burton	Kincardine Kings	24	64	37	101	2
Mike Reaume	Kincardine Kings	21	20	49	69	19
Mark Albrecht	Tavistock Royals	23	26	41	67	18
Darryl Jack	Drayton Comets	22	32	30	62	14
Steve Miller	Palmerston 81's	22	27	34	61	18
Barry Riff	Drayton Comets	21	31	27	58	6
Steve Simpson	Lucknow Lancers	24	28	26	54	2
Kevin Albrecht	Tavistock Royals	21	23	30	53	11
Don Richardson	Wiarton Redmen	23	21	32	53	30
Kelly Hellyer	Lion's Head North Stars	18	27	25	52	28

== Playoffs ==
=== Grand Championship playoff bracket ===
Grand Championship quarter-final
1	Durham	bye
2	Arthur	3
3	Drayton	1

Grand Championship final
1	Durham	2
2	Arthur	3

==== Grand Championship semi-finals ====
===== (2) Arthur Tigers vs. (3) Drayton Comets =====
March 16	Arthur Tigers	7 – 5	Drayton Comets	Drayton

March 17	Drayton Comets	0 – 5	Arthur Tigers	Arthur

March 19	Arthur Tigers	5 – 6	Drayton Comets	Drayton

March 22	Drayton Comets	1 – 6	Arthur Tigers	Arthur

Arthur wins series 3 – 1

==== Grand Championship finals ====
===== (1) Durham Thundercats vs. (2) Arthur Tigers =====
March 29	Arthur Tigers	2 – 8	Durham Thundercats	Durham

April 2	Durham Thundercats	1 – 8	Arthur Tigers	Arthur

April 5	Arthur Tigers	3 – 4	Durham Thundercats	Durham

April 6	Durham Thundercats	1 – 8	Arthur Tigers	Arthur

April 12	Arthur Tigers	6 – 5	Durham Thundercats	Durham

Arthur wins series 3 – 2

==== Sr. "A" playoff bracket ====
Sr. "A" Preliminary
1	Durham	bye
8	Teeswater	2
9	Grand Valley	0
2	Palmerston	bye
7	Milverton	bye
3	Kincardine	bye
6	Brussels	bye
4	Tavistock	bye
5	Wellesley	bye

Sr. "A" quarter-finals
1	Durham	3
8	Teeswater	0
2	Palmerston	2
7	Milverton	3
3	Kincardine	3
6	Brussels	0
4	Tavistock	3
5	Wellesley	2

Sr. "A" semi-finals
1	Durham	3
7	Milverton	0
3	Kincardine	0
4	Tavistock	3

Sr. "A" finals
1	Durham	3
4	Tavistock	1

==== WOAA Senior "A" preliminary round ====
===== (8) Teeswater Falcons vs. (9) Grand Valley Tornado =====
February 9	Grand Valley Tornado	5 – 6	Teeswater Falcons	Teeswater

February 10	Teeswater Falcons	6 – 5	Grand Valley Tornado	Grand Valley

Teeswater wins series 2 – 0

==== WOAA Senior "A" quarter-finals ====
===== (1) Durham Thundercats vs. (8) Teeswater Falcons =====
February 17	Durham Thundercats	12 – 1	Teeswater Falcons	Teeswater

February 20	Teeswater Falcons	3 – 12	Durham Thundercats	Durham

February 22	Teeswater Falcons	2 – 13	Durham Thundercats	Durham

Durham wins series 3 – 0

===== (2) Palmerston 81's vs. (7) Milverton Four Wheel Drives =====
Note: Game three played in Harriston, Ontario

February 15	Milverton Four Wheel Drives	3 – 8	Palmerston 81's	Palmerston

February 17	Palmerston 81's	4 – 7	Milverton Four Wheel Drives	Milverton

February 22	Milverton Four Wheel Drives	1 – 11	Palmerston 81's	Palmerston

February 24	Palmerston 81's	2 – 3	Milverton Four Wheel Drives	Milverton

February 25	Milverton Four Wheel Drives	9 – 7	Palmerston 81's	Palmerston

Milverton wins series 3 – 2

===== (3) Kincardine Kings vs. (6) Brussels Crusaders =====
February 16	Kincardine Kings	8 – 4	Brussels Crusaders	Brussels

February 17	Brussels Crusaders	4 – 8	Kincardine Kings	Kincardine

February 22	Brussels Crusaders	3 – 7	Kincardine Kings	Kincardine

Kincardine wins series 3 – 0

===== (4) Tavistock Royals vs. (5) Wellesley Merchants =====
February 11	Wellesley Merchants	6 – 4	Tavistock Royals	Tavistock

February 17	Tavistock Royals	8 – 2	Wellesley Merchants	Wellesley

February 18	Wellesley Merchants	5 – 2	Tavistock Royals	Tavistock

February 23	Tavistock Royals	5 – 3	Wellesley Merchants	Wellesley

February 25	Wellesley Merchants	3 – 9	Tavistock Royals	Tavistock

Tavistock wins series 3 – 2

==== WOAA Senior "A" semi-finals ====
===== (1) Durham Thundercats vs. (7) Milverton Four Wheel Drives =====
March 2	Milverton Four Wheel Drives	0 – 6	Durham Thundercats	Durham

March 3	Durham Thundercats	5 – 1	Milverton Four Wheel Drives	Milverton

March 8	Milverton Four Wheel Drives	3 – 7	Durham Thundercats	Durham

Durham wins series 3 – 0

===== (3) Kincardine Kings vs. (4) Tavistock Royals =====
March 1	Tavistock Royals	8 – 2	Kincardine Kings	Kincardine

March 4	Kincardine Kings	3 – 4	OT	Tavistock Royals	Tavistock

March 9	Tavistock Royals	5 – 2	Kincardine Kings	Kincardine

Tavistock wins series 3 – 0

==== WOAA Sr. "A" Championship ====
===== (1) Durham Thundercats vs. (4) Tavistock Royals =====
March 15	Tavistock Royals	2 – 6	Durham Thundercats	Durham

March 18	Durham Thundercats	2 – 1	OT	Tavistock Royals	Tavistock

March 24	Tavistock Royals	8 – 4	Durham Thundercats	Durham

March 25	Durham Thundercats	5 – 3	Tavistock Royals	Tavistock

Durham wins series 3 – 1

=== WOAA Senior "B" Hockey playoffs ===
==== Sr. A playoff bracket ====
Sr. "B" semi-finals
1	Wiarton	bye
2	Arthur	3
3	Dundalk	0

Sr. "B" finals
1	Wiarton	0
2	Arthur	3

==== WOAA Senior "B" semi-finals ====
===== (2) Arthur Tigers vs. (3) Dundalk Flyers =====
February 8	Dundalk Flyers	2 – 5	Arthur Tigers	Arthur

February 10	Arthur Tigers	8 – 5	Dundalk Flyers	Dundalk

February 15	Dundalk Flyers	4 – 7	Arthur Tigers	Arthur

Arthur wins series 3 – 0

==== WOAA Senior "B" Championship ====
===== (1) Wiarton Redmen vs. (2) Arthur Tigers =====
February 22	Arthur Tigers	9 – 8	Wiarton Redmen	Wiarton

March 1	Wiarton Redmen	4 – 8	Arthur Tigers	Arthur

March 3	Arthur Tigers	9 – 3	Wiarton Redmen	Wiarton

Arthur wins series 3 – 0

=== WOAA Senior "C" Hockey playoffs ===
==== Sr. "C" playoff bracket ====
Sr. "C" semi-finals
1	Drayton	3
4	Lucknow	1
2	Ripley	3
3	Lion's Head	2

Sr. "C" finals
1	Drayton	3
2	Ripley	1

==== WOAA Senior "C" semi-finals ====
===== (1) Drayton Comets vs. (4) Lucknow Lancers =====
February 9	Lucknow Lancers	8 – 1	Drayton Comets	Drayton

February 10	Drayton Comets	5 – 2	Lucknow Lancers	Lucknow

February 13	Lucknow Lancers	4 – 5	Drayton Comets	Drayton

February 15	Drayton Comets	5 – 4	OT	Lucknow Lancers	Lucknow

Drayton wins series 3 – 1

===== (2) Ripley Wolves vs. (3) Lion's Head North Stars =====
February 8	Ripley Wolves	8 – 6	Lion's Head North Stars	Lion's Head

February 10	Lion's Head North Stars	9 – 6	Ripley Wolves	Ripley

February 15	Lion's Head North Stars	3 – 9	Ripley Wolves	Ripley

February 17	Ripley Wolves	5 – 6	2OT	Lion's Head North Stars	Lion's Head

February 20	Lion's Head North Stars	2 – 5	Ripley Wolves	Ripley

Ripley wins series 3 – 2

==== WOAA Senior "C" Championship ====
===== (1) Drayton Comets vs. (2) Ripley Wolves =====
February 23	Ripley Wolves	3 – 5	Drayton Comets	Drayton

February 24	Drayton Comets	11 – 3	Ripley Wolves	Ripley

March 2	Ripley Wolves	6 – 5	Drayton Comets	Drayton

March 8	Drayton Comets	7 – 3	Ripley Wolves	Ripley

Drayton wins series 3 – 1
