= 1994–95 WOAA Senior League season =

- League: WOAA Senior AA Hockey League
- Sport: Hockey
- Duration: Regular season October 1994 – January 1995; Playoffs; February 1995 – April 1995
- Teams: 20
- Finals champions: Sr. "AA" Champions - Tavistock Royals; Sr. "A" Champions - Wiarton Redmen; Sr. "B" Champions - Ripley Wolves

WOAA Senior League seasons
- 1993–94 1995–96

The 1994–95 WOAA Senior League season was the 5th season of the WOAA Senior AA Hockey League. The league played a regular season schedule which began in October 1994 and concluded in January 1995. The post-season began in February 1995 and concluded in April 1995.

The Tavistock Royals won the Sr. "AA" championship, defeating the Durham Thundercats in six games. The Wiarton Redmen won the Sr. "A" championship and the Ripley Wolves won the Sr. "B" championship.

== Team changes ==
- The Lion's Head North Stars fold.
- The Wellesley Merchants return to the league and will play in the Senior "A" division.
- The Clinton Radar join the league as an expansion team and will play in the Senior "A" division.

== Senior "A" ==
=== Final standings ===
Note: GP = Games played; W = Wins; L= Losses; OTL = Overtime losses; GF = Goals for; GA = Goals against; Pts = Points; Green shade = Clinched "AA" playoff spot

Rank	Senior "A" Standings	GP	W	L	T	OTL	Pts	GF	GA
1	Durham Thundercats	24	22	2	0	0	44	178	59
2	Tavistock Royals	24	20	4	0	0	40	171	93
3	Lakeshore Winterhawks	22	17	3	1	1	36	162	82
4	Milverton Four Wheel Drives	24	17	6	0	1	35	124	91
5	Elora Rocks	24	16	7	1	0	33	143	80
6	Brussels Crusaders	23	11	10	2	0	24	131	119
7	Shelburne Muskies	24	11	13	0	0	22	157	144
8	Wellesley Merchants	24	9	13	1	1	20	104	150
9	Arthur Tigers	24	9	14	1	0	19	116	165
10	Wiarton Redmen	24	8	14	1	1	18	132	139
11	Drayton Comets	24	7	15	0	2	16	103	158
12	Palmerston 81's	24	0	20	1	3	4	65	205
13	Clinton Radar	23	1	21	0	1	3	91	192

=== Scoring leaders ===
Note: GP = Games played; G = Goals; A = Assists; Pts = Points; PIM = Penalty minutes

Player	Team	GP	G	A	Pts	PIM
Joe Scherer	Tavistock Royals	22	35	37	72	30
Jason Castellan	Elora Rocks	22	29	24	53	28
Greg Snyder	Tavistock Royals	21	26	27	53	92
Bill Evans	Wellesley Merchants	24	25	24	49	8
Ron White	Tavistock Royals	22	21	27	48	4
Bill Spielmacher	Durham Thundercats	22	15	33	48	87
Don Richardson	Wiarton Redmen	24	16	31	47	33
Bill Jacques	Lakeshore Winterhawks	22	19	27	46	32
Jeff Neumann	Elora Rocks	20	13	33	46	18
Scott Betts	Durham Thundercats	18	20	22	42	19

=== Sr. "AA" playoff bracket ===
Sr. "AA" quarter-finals
1	Durham	4
8	Wellesley	0
4	Milverton	1
5	Elora	4
2	Tavistock	4
7	Shelburne	0
3	Lakeshore	4
6	Brussels	1

Sr. "AA" semi-finals
1	Durham	4
5	Elora	2
2	Tavistock	4
3	Lakeshore	1

Sr. "AA" finals
1	Durham	2
2	Tavistock	4

=== Sr. "A" playoff bracket ===
Sr. "A" preliminary round
9	Arthur	bye
12	Palmerston	2
13	Clinton	1
10	Wiarton	bye
11	Drayton	bye

Sr. "A" semi-finals
9	Arthur	4
12	Palmerston	1
10	Wiarton	4
11	Drayton	0

Sr. "A" finals
9	Arthur	1
10	Wiarton	4

== Senior "B" ==
=== Final standings ===
Note: GP = Games played; W = Wins; L= Losses; OTL = Overtime losses; GF = Goals for; GA = Goals against; Pts = Points; Green shade = Clinched playoff spot

Rank	Senior "B" Standings	GP	W	L	T	OTL	Pts	GF	GA
1	Ripley Wolves	21	19	2	0	0	38	174	52
2	Lucknow Lancers	23	18	5	0	0	36	147	83
3	Dundalk Flyers	24	13	9	2	0	28	152	106
4	Mildmay Monarchs	22	11	9	2	0	24	101	90
5	Grand Valley Tornadoes	20	6	12	0	2	14	92	140
6	Teeswater Falcons	22	5	16	1	0	11	74	157
7	Tiverton Thunder	22	1	20	1	0	3	60	172

=== Scoring leaders ===
Note: GP = Games played; G = Goals; A = Assists; Pts = Points; PIM = Penalty minutes

Player	Team	GP	G	A	Pts	PIM
Sean Burton	Ripley Wolves	21	36	39	75	6
Brent Armstrong	Ripley Wolves	21	27	39	66	6
Brad Priestap	Lucknow Lancers	22	24	34	58	89
Chris Irwin	Lucknow Lancers	20	23	30	53	44
Shawn Miller	Dundalk Flyers	20	23	26	49	66
Lou Godfrey	Ripley Wolves	19	18	26	44	45
Sean Vanalstine	Dundalk Flyers	16	24	14	38	49
Bill Patterson	Ripley Wolves	21	16	20	36	2
Russell Sutton	Lucknow Lancers	23	7	29	36	102
Dave Vanalstine	Dundalk Flyers	23	15	20	35	23

=== Sr. "B" playoff bracket ===
Sr. "B" quarter-finals
1	Ripley	bye
4	Mildmay	3
5	Grand Valley	1
2	Lucknow	bye
3	Dundalk	3
6	Teeswater	1

Sr. "B" semi-finals
1	Ripley	4
4	Mildmay	1
2	Lucknow	2
3	Dundalk	4

Sr. "B" finals
1	Ripley	4
3	Dundalk	0
