= 1991–92 WOAA Senior League season =

- League: WOAA Senior AA Hockey League
- Sport: Hockey
- Duration: Regular season October 1991 – January 1992; Playoffs; February 1992 – March 1992
- Teams: 18
- Finals champions: Sr. "A" Champions - Durham Thundercats; Sr. "B" Champions - Lion's Head North Stars

WOAA Senior League seasons
- 1990–91 1992–93

The 1991–92 WOAA Senior League season was the 2nd season of the WOAA Senior AA Hockey League. The league played a regular season schedule which began in October 1991 and concluded in January 1992. The post-season began in February 1992 and concluded in March 1992.

The Durham Thundercats won the Sr. "A" championship, while the Lion's Head North Stars won the Sr. "B" championship.

== Team changes ==
- The Western Ontario Athletic Association announced that the Senior Hockey League would be divided into two divisions, Senior "A" and Senior "B".
- The Monkton Wildcats take a leave of absence from the league.
- The Wellesley Merchants take a leave of absence from the league.
- The Harriston Blues join the league as an expansion team. They will play in the Senior "A" division.
- The Mildmay Monarchs join the league as an expansion team. They will play in the Senior "B" division.
- The Tiverton Thunder join the league as an expansion team. They will play in the Senior "B" division.

== Senior "A" ==
=== Final standings ===
Note: GP = Games played; W = Wins; L= Losses; OTL = Overtime losses; GF = Goals for; GA = Goals against; Pts = Points; Green shade = Clinched playoff spot

Rank	Senior "A" Standings	GP	W	L	T	Pts	GF	GA
1	Tavistock Royals	26	23	2	1	47	207	93
2	Durham Thundercats	26	21	3	2	44	213	113
3	Kincardine Kings	26	15	8	3	33	160	142
4	Drayton Comets	26	13	10	3	29	155	138
5	Arthur Tigers	26	13	13	0	26	116	131
6	Brussels Crusaders	26	9	15	2	20	140	162
7	Palmerston 81's	26	8	14	4	20	130	161
8	Wiarton Redmen	26	7	15	4	18	144	198
9	Milverton Four Wheel Drives	26	8	17	1	17	116	166
10	Harriston Blues	26	2	22	2	6	101	176

=== Scoring leaders ===
Note: GP = Games played; G = Goals; A = Assists; Pts = Points; PIM = Penalty minutes

Player	Team	GP	G	A	Pts	PIM
Mark Albrecht	Tavistock Royals	26	32	56	88	14
Sean Burton	Kincardine Kings	24	32	42	74	2
Kevin Albrecht	Tavistock Royals	24	21	49	70	10
Brad Stere	Tavistock Royals	25	39	28	67	16
Mike Reaume	Kincardine Kings	23	26	38	64	29
Rob LeBlanc	Durham Thundercats	18	29	32	61	61
Rob Drost	Palmerston 81's	23	25	36	61	10
Todd Stoddart	Durham Thundercats	26	28	31	59	32
Ken Gosleigh	Kincardine Kings	25	27	29	56	20
Don Richardson	Wiarton Redmen	26	23	30	53	30

=== Sr. "A" playoff bracket ===
Sr. "A" Preliminary
1	Tavistock	bye
8	Wiarton	2
9	Milverton	1
4	Drayton	bye
5	Arthur	bye
2	Durham	bye
7	Palmerston	2
10	Harriston	1
3	Kincardine	bye
6	Brussels	bye

Sr. "A" quarter-finals
1	Tavistock	3
8	Wiarton	2
4	Drayton	3
5	Arthur	2
2	Durham	3
7	Palmerston	0
3	Kincardine	3
6	Brussels	2

Sr. "A" semi-finals
1	Tavistock	3
4	Drayton	0
2	Durham	3
3	Kincardine	0

Sr. "A" finals
1	Tavistock	0
4	Durham	4

==== WOAA Sr. "A" Championship ====
===== (1) Tavistock Royals vs. (2) Durham Thundercats =====
March 22	Tavistock Royals	5 – 7	Durham Thundercats	Durham

March 23	Durham Thundercats	5 – 4	Tavistock Royals	Tavistock

March 27	Durham Thundercats	10 – 6	Tavistock Royals	Tavistock

March 28	Tavistock Royals	3 – 8	Durham Thundercats	Durham

Durham wins series 4 – 0

== Senior "B" ==
=== Final standings ===
Note: GP = Games played; W = Wins; L= Losses; OTL = Overtime losses; GF = Goals for; GA = Goals against; Pts = Points; Green shade = Clinched playoff spot

Rank	Senior "B" Standings	GP	W	L	T	Pts	GF	GA
1	Grand Valley Tornado's	21	16	4	1	33	184	99
2	Lucknow Lancers	21	14	6	1	29	130	97
3	Dundalk Flyers	21	12	7	2	26	120	93
4	Mildmay Monarchs	21	10	9	2	22	126	113
5	Tiverton Thunder	21	10	9	2	22	107	94
6	Lion's Head North Stars	21	9	9	3	21	114	111
7	Ripley Wolves	21	3	16	2	8	83	138
8	Teeswater Falcons	21	3	17	1	7	96	215

=== Scoring leaders ===
Note: GP = Games played; G = Goals; A = Assists; Pts = Points; PIM = Penalty minutes

Player	Team	GP	G	A	Pts	PIM
Mark Thomas	Grand Valley Tornado's	18	25	31	56	124
Scott Girdler	Mildmay Monarchs	19	19	35	54	142
Joe Zettler	Mildmay Monarchs	21	28	23	51	38
Steve Simpson	Lucknow Lancers	21	21	29	50	14
Sean Vanalstine	Dundalk Flyers	18	29	20	49	87
Dan Schiestel	Teeswater Falcons	20	30	18	48	70
Dave Risk	Dundalk Flyers	21	10	36	46	40
Mark Burdette	Grand Valley Tornado's	19	12	29	41	18
Kelly Hellyer	Lion's Head North Stars	19	17	23	40	36
Randy Fritz	Mildmay Monarchs	18	21	18	39	34

=== Sr. "B" playoff bracket ===
Sr. "B" quarter-finals
1	Grand Valley	3
8	Teeswater	0
3	Dundalk	1
6	Lion's Head	3
2	Lucknow	3
7	Ripley	1
4	Mildmay	3
5	Tiverton	2

Sr. "B" semi-finals
1	Grand Valley	1
6	Lion's Head	3
2	Lucknow	3
4	Mildmay	0

Sr. "B" finals
6	Lion's Head	3
2	Lucknow	0

==== WOAA Sr. "B" Championship ====
===== (2) Lucknow Lancers vs. (6) Lion's Head North Stars =====
March 20	Lion's Head North Stars	5 – 4	Lucknow Lancers	Lucknow

March 22	Lucknow Lancers	1 – 6	Lion's Head North Stars	Lions Head

March 27	Lion's Head North Stars	9 – 5	Lucknow Lancers	Lucknow

Lion's Head wins series 3 – 0
