= Tiverton Thunder =

Canadian hockey team

- City: Tiverton, Ontario, Canada
- League: WOAA Senior Hockey League
- Operated: 1991-1995
- Home arena: Tiverton & District Sports Complex

The Tiverton Thunder were a senior hockey team based out of Tiverton, Ontario, Canada. They played in the WOAA Senior Hockey League.

The club began to operate in the 1991-92 season and would fold following the 1994-95 season.

== Illegal player ==
In the 1993-94 season, the Thunder finished the regular season with a 9-9-2 record. Tiverton then was found to have an illegal player on the team, and the club forfeited all of their games.

== Season-by-season record ==
Note: GP = Games played, W = Wins, L = Losses, OTL = Overtime Losses, Pts = Points, GF = Goals for, GA = Goals against

Season	GP	W	L	T	OTL	GF	GA	PTS	Finish	Playoffs
1991–92	21	10	9	2	-	107	94	22	5th in WOAA Sr. "B"	Lost in "B" quarter-finals (2-3 vs. Monarchs)
1992–93	21	4	15	2	-	81	132	10	8th in WOAA Sr. "B"	Lost in "B" quarter-finals (0-3 vs. Tornadoes)
1993–94	20	0	20	0	-	135	103	0	8th in WOAA Sr. "B"	Lost in "B" quarter-finals (forfeit vs. Wolves)
1994–95	23	1	20	1	0	60	172	3	7th in WOAA Sr. A	Did not qualify

== Related links ==
- Tiverton, Ontario
- WOAA Senior Hockey League
