= Brussels Crusaders =

Canadian hockey team

- City: Brussels, Ontario, Canada
- League: WOAA Senior Hockey League
- Operated: 1986-1992, 1993-1997, 2002-2005
- Home arena: BMG Arena

The Brussels Crusaders were a senior hockey team based out of Brussels, Ontario, Canada. They played in the WOAA Senior Hockey League.

The club sat out the 1992–93 season, however, the Crusaders returned in 1993–94. The club once again withdrew from the WOAA from 1997 to 2002, before returning for the 2002–03 season.

The Crusaders would fold following the 2004–05 season.

== Championships ==
The Crusaders won the WOAA Grand Championship twice, in 1988 and 1990. In 1988, Brussels defeated the Lion's Head North Stars three-games-to-two in the Championship series. In 1990, the Crusaders defeated the Drayton Comets three-games-to-one for their second Grand Championship in three seasons. The club also won the "A" championship in 1988 and 1990 during the Grand Championship era, defeating the Kincardine Kings in both of those series.

In 1989, the Crusaders swept the Arthur Tigers in three games to capture the WOAA Sr. "B" championship. In those three wins, the Crusaders outscored the Tigers 46–16.

The Crusaders also won the 1996 WOAA Sr. A championship, defeating the Ripley Wolves four-games-to-one in the final series.

A previous Crusaders club lost in the 1980 WOAA Grand Championship, losing to the Lion's Head North Stars in the final series.

== Season-by-season record ==
Note: GP = Games played, W = Wins, L = Losses, OTL = Overtime Losses, Pts = Points, GF = Goals for, GA = Goals against

Season	GP	W	L	T	OTL	GF	GA	PTS	Finish	Playoffs
1986-87	24	16	7	1	-	166	102	33	2nd in South	Won in "B" semi-finals (4-1 vs. Lancers); Lost in "B" finals (1-4 vs. Merchants)
1987-88	19	12	6	1	-	128	75	23	2nd in South	Won in "A" quarter-finals (4-2 vs. Thundercats); Won in "A" finals (4-3 vs. Kings); Won Grand Championship finals (3-2 vs. North Stars)
1988-89	20	12	5	3	-	124	92	27	2nd in South	Won in "B" finals (3-0 vs. Tigers); Lost in Grand Championship quarter-finals (0-3 vs. North Stars)
1989-90	21	15	4	2	-	151	89	32	1st in South	Won in "A" quarter-finals (4-0 vs. Tornadoes); Won in "A" semi-finals (3-2 vs. Royals); Won in "A" finals (3-1 vs. Kings); Won in Grand Championship finals (3-1 vs. Comets)
1990–91	23	11	10	2	-	148	121	24	6th in South	Lost in "A" quarter-finals (0-3 vs. Kings)
1991–92	24	9	15	2	-	140	162	20	6th in WOAA Sr. A	Lost in "A" quarter-finals (2-3 vs. Kings)
1993–94	20	13	5	2	-	121	99	28	3rd in WOAA Sr. A	Won in "A" quarter-finals (4-1 vs. Comets); Lost in "A" semi-finals (1-4 vs. Thundercats)
1994–95	23	11	10	2	0	131	119	24	6th in WOAA Sr. A	Lost in "A" quarter-finals (1-4 vs. Winterhawks)
1995–96	24	16	6	2	0	154	104	34	3rd in WOAA Sr. A	Won in "A" quarter-finals (4-0 vs. Tigers); Won in "A" semi-finals (4-2 vs. Redmen); Won in "A" finals (4-1 vs. Wolves)
1996–97	24	9	13	2	0	104	120	20	7th in WOAA Sr. A	Lost in "A" quarter-finals (0-4 vs. Redmen)
2002–03	24	0	22	2	2	49	214	4	15th in WOAA	Lost in "A" quarter-finals (0-4 vs. Rocks); Lost in "A" Tier II semi-finals (1–2 in round-robin vs. Jets and Pirates)
2003–04	24	3	20	1	0	63	128	7	17th in WOAA	Lost in elimination round (0-2 vs. Wolves)
2004–05	25	1	21	2	1	59	190	5	18th in WOAA	Lost in elimination round (0-2 vs. Spitfires)

== Related links ==
- Brussels, Ontario
- WOAA Senior Hockey League
