= Teeswater, Ontario =

Teeswater
- Community
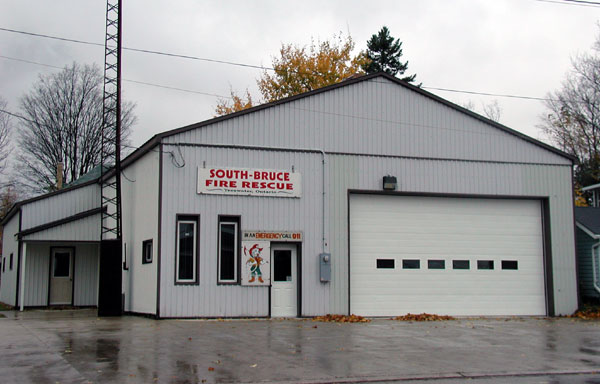
- Teeswater-Culross Fire Station

- Location in southern Ontario
- Coordinates: 43°59′N 81°17′W
- Country: Canada
- Province: Ontario
- County: Bruce County
- Municipality: South Bruce

Area
  - Total: 2.47 km^{2} (0.95 sq mi)

Population (2021)
  - Total: 980
  - Density: 400/km^{2} (1,000/sq mi)
- Time zone: UTC-5 (EST)
  - Summer (DST): UTC-4 (EDT)

Teeswater is a community in the municipality of South Bruce, Bruce County, Ontario, Canada. It is located 12 kilometres west of Mildmay, 16 kilometres north of Wingham on County Road 4, and 25 kilometres southeast of Ripley on Bruce Road 6. The population in 2021 was 980.

== History ==
Teeswater is located on the Teeswater River, a tributary of the Saugeen River. Surveyors named the river after the River Tees in England and the settlement was named for the river. The post office dates from 1855. The first settlers, mainly English and Scottish, arrived in 1856. Teeswater was incorporated as a village in 1875 and remained a separate municipality until it was amalgamated with Culross Township to form the Township of Teeswater-Culross in 1998. In 1999, Teeswater-Culross was itself amalgamated with the Township of Mildmay-Carrick to form the new municipality of South Bruce. Teeswater is the administrative centre of South Bruce and the largest community in the municipality.

A weekly newspaper, The Teeswater News was published from 1871 until 1996. The building where the weekly newspaper was published burned down. Now in its place is The Kinsman Memorial park. The park was finished October 2008.

Teeswater nurtured a musical tradition as it grew, supporting first a string orchestra and a later a flourishing concert band. It is home to the Highlanders Pipes and Drums (established in 1961), which regularly presents concerts on the lawn beside the Town Hall.

=== Churches ===
Knox Presbyterian Church was built in the 1870s, and is now a continuing congregation of the Presbyterian Church in Canada. Another church of the same denomination, Westminster Presbyterian Church, burnt to the ground in the 1970s. Teeswater United Church was built in 1879 as the Wesleyan Methodist Church. It became the Teeswater Methodist Church in 1884, and since 1925 has been affiliated with the United Church of Canada. Sacred Heart Roman Catholic Church was built around the same time as the two Protestant churches, and is located next to the school of the same name. In the past, Teeswater has been home to churches of the Anglican, Baptist, Pentecostal, Free Presbyterian, Episcopal Methodist, and Wesleyan Methodist faiths. Now there are only three churches: the Roman Catholic, United, and Presbyterian.

== Demographics ==
In the 2021 Census of Population conducted by Statistics Canada, Teeswater had a population of 1,030 living in 455 of its 484 total private dwellings, a change of 3.5% from its 2016 population of 995. With a land area of 2.52 km^{2} (0.97 sq mi), it had a population density of 408.7/km^{2} (1,058.6/sq mi) in 2021.

== Economy ==
Homeowner septic systems were replaced with a community sewer system in Teeswater and Formosa.

The population of Teeswater has remained fairly constant over the past 100 years at approximately 1100.

=== Grist Mills ===
Teeswater was a site of 2 commercial grist mills, Littles mill, and the Teeswater & district Co-op grist mill. Littles mill is still standing and is now a house, with the mill pond and river dam still in place. The co-op mill burnt down in 1976, and the dam taken out in about 1991. The pond location and dam bed can still be seen today. For many years before and after the mill burned down, children would go and play ice hockey on the frozen mill pond. The site of the co-op mill building is located near the Teeswater Creamery holding tank for spoiled milk.

=== Teeswater Creamery ===
Teeswater Creamery was first established in 1875, and has been a major provider of employment since then. It was run by Thompson Brothers from 1932 until 1981, when it was sold to Gay Lea.

== Education ==
The village is currently home to two schools, Hillcrest Central Public School (Bluewater District School Board), and Sacred Heart Catholic School (Bruce-Grey Catholic District School Board.

=== Library ===
Teeswater has the Bruce County Public Library, Teeswater branch. It is a Carnegie Library.

== Infrastructure ==
The Teeswater-Culross Fire Hall occupies the former British Petroleum Canada (BP) service station. In 1959, the service station was destroyed by fire. The lot was purchased and a new garage was erected under the BP banner. In 1976, the garage was sold to the Teeswater-Culross Fire Department.

== Notable people ==
- Jennie Fletcher - a swimmer who moved to Teeswater after winning gold for Britain in swimming at the 1912 Olympics
- James Gillies - founding Dean of the Schulich School of Business and M.P. during the 30th Canadian Parliament
- Mary Riter Hamilton, painter

== Media ==
- Cable television is provided by Rogers TV and Wightman Telecom
- CKNX-FM 101.7 "The One" - local, regional and national news and adult contemporary music
- CIBU-FM 94.5 "The Bull" - local, regional and national news and classic rock music
- CKNX (AM) 920 - country music

== Bus Transportation ==
- Voyago (buses from Hanover, Ontario) (formerly Kunkel Bus Lines) (For students bused to Walkerton and Formosa)
- Montgomery Bus Lines (buses from Wingham, Ontario) (for the 2 elementary schools in the same village) (Also for students bused to Wingham)

== See also ==
- List of unincorporated communities in Ontario
