= Dundalk, Ontario =

- Village
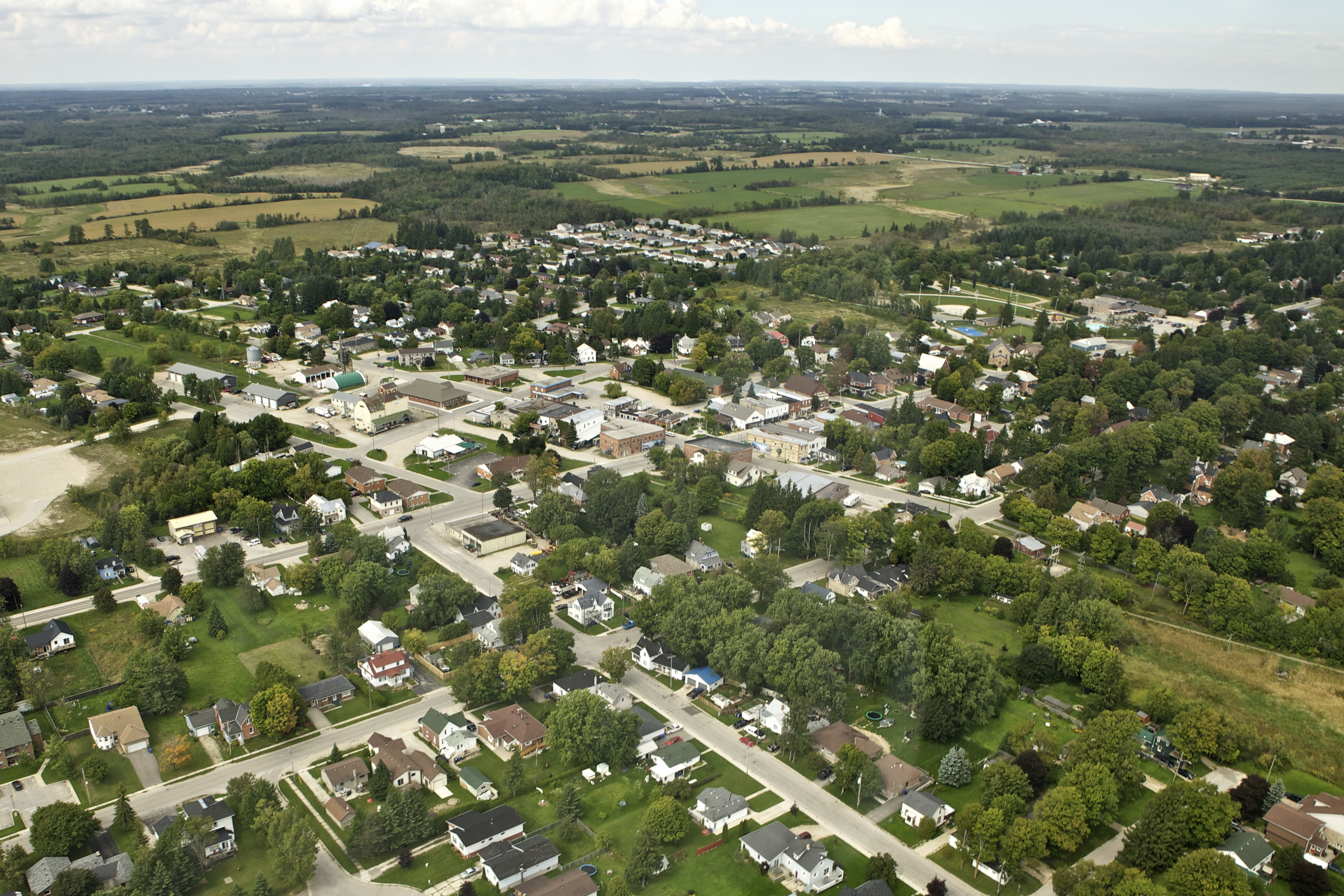
- Interactive map of Dundalk, Ontario
- Coordinates: 44.169246°N 80.391989°W
- Country: Canada
- Province: Ontario
- County: Grey
- Municipality: Southgate
- Incorporated: 1887

Government
  - Mayor: Brian Milne
- Elevation: 526 m (1,726 ft)

Population (2021)Statistics Canada Community Profiles
  - Total: 2,803
  - Density: 1,161.8/km^{2} (3,009/sq mi)
- Time zone: UTC-5 (EST)
  - Summer (DST): UTC-4 (EDT)
- Postal code span: N0C
- Website: www.southgate.ca

Dundalk (named after Dundalk in Ireland), first called McDowell's Corners, was originally located on the Toronto-Sydenham Road (now Hwy.10), but moved about a mile to the west to be closer to the Toronto Grey and Bruce railway when it went through in the 1870s. Dundalk was incorporated as a village in 1887. On January 1, 2000, it was amalgamated with the Township of Proton and the Township of Egremont to form the Township of Southgate, in the southeast corner of Grey County. The mayor of Southgate is Brian Milne. Dundalk services the surrounding agricultural area and also has a few small manufacturing plants. Dundalk has the highest elevation of any populated place in southern Ontario at 526m (1,726 feet). A rail line that used to pass through Dundalk is now removed, but its roadbed has become a multi-use trail sponsored by the federal government.

Dundalk has a population of 2,803, according to Statistics Canada 2021 Census Profile.

== Community ==
Dundalk's schools are: Dundalk and Proton Community School (K-2), Highpoint Community School (3-6). and then the 3rd floor of grey highlands has the grade 7 - 8 students Most students who graduate from Highpoint continue their education at Grey Highlands Secondary School.

Dundalk is home to an arena and community centre located at 550 Main St. E. The community centre provides facilities for lacrosse, hockey and skating and can accommodate banquet seating up to 250 people. Dundalk also houses a library, Southgate Ruth Harvgrave Memorial Library, located at 80 Proton St. N, in the Southgate Community Services Building.

Dundalk and the surrounding area is served by a local newspaper, the Dundalk Herald which was purchased in the 1960s by its present owners' parents, Walter and Phylis Walls. The Dundalk Herald is one of the last independently owned newspapers in the area.

Dundalk has churches representing Catholic, Anglican, (Methodist) and Protestant denominations.

== Climate ==
Dundalk features a humid continental climate of the warm-summer variety (Dfb) given its high elevation (1,735 feet) and inland location. The town often sees cold, snowy winters and warm, sometimes humid, summers. Due to its position downwind of Lake Huron, Dundalk is in the traditional lake-effect snowbelt region of Southern Ontario, an area that can see up to 300 centimeters of snow in a year. As such, the transition months of spring and fall, especially the latter, are short due to late season snowfalls that can occur as early as late October and as late as May.

Climate data for Proton Station, Ontario (1981-2010 Normals)
Month	Jan	Feb	Mar	Apr	May	Jun	Jul	Aug	Sep	Oct	Nov	Dec	Year
Record high °C (°F)	12.0 (53.6)	14.0 (57.2)	21.5 (70.7)	27.5 (81.5)	30.0 (86.0)	31.5 (88.7)	32.5 (90.5)	33.5 (92.3)	30.6 (87.1)	26.1 (79.0)	23.0 (73.4)	17.0 (62.6)	33.5 (92.3)
Mean daily maximum °C (°F)	−4.4 (24.1)	−3.2 (26.2)	1.3 (34.3)	9.3 (48.7)	16.5 (61.7)	21.2 (70.2)	23.5 (74.3)	22.7 (72.9)	18.1 (64.6)	11.5 (52.7)	4.2 (39.6)	−1.6 (29.1)	9.9 (49.9)
Daily mean °C (°F)	−8.3 (17.1)	−7.4 (18.7)	−3.4 (25.9)	4.5 (40.1)	10.8 (51.4)	15.5 (59.9)	17.8 (64.0)	17.1 (62.8)	12.9 (55.2)	7.1 (44.8)	0.9 (33.6)	−5.0 (23.0)	5.2 (41.4)
Mean daily minimum °C (°F)	−12.1 (10.2)	−11.6 (11.1)	−8.0 (17.6)	−0.5 (31.1)	5.2 (41.4)	9.8 (49.6)	12.1 (53.8)	11.4 (52.5)	7.8 (46.0)	2.7 (36.9)	−2.4 (27.7)	−8.3 (17.1)	0.5 (32.9)
Record low °C (°F)	−37.2 (−35.0)	−37.0 (−34.6)	−36.0 (−32.8)	−21.7 (−7.1)	−5.0 (23.0)	−2.2 (28.0)	0.5 (32.9)	−1.0 (30.2)	−5.0 (23.0)	−12.2 (10.0)	−21.0 (−5.8)	−31.0 (−23.8)	−37.2 (−35.0)
Average precipitation mm (inches)	107.8 (4.24)	84.3 (3.32)	79.2 (3.12)	72.1 (2.84)	89.8 (3.54)	93.5 (3.68)	77.9 (3.07)	91.9 (3.62)	104.4 (4.11)	92.3 (3.63)	110.9 (4.37)	102.1 (4.02)	1,106.2 (43.56)
Average snowfall cm (inches)	83.1 (32.7)	60.3 (23.7)	44.2 (17.4)	13.1 (5.2)	0.5 (0.2)	0.0 (0.0)	0.0 (0.0)	0.0 (0.0)	0.2 (0.1)	5.6 (2.2)	39.7 (15.6)	74.1 (29.2)	320.8 (126.3)
Average precipitation days	22.8	16.8	16.0	14.6	13.0	12.8	11.9	13.1	15.3	16.9	19.3	21.1	193.6
Average snowy days	20.4	14.5	11.8	4.7	0.18	0.0	0.0	0.0	0.05	1.9	9.5	17.7	80.73
Source: Environment Canada

== Location ==
Dundalk is approximately 125 kilometres northwest from downtown Toronto, by road.

== Notable people ==
- Agnes Macphail
- Ron Oliver, film director and writer
