= Mildmay, Ontario =

Mildmay
- Community
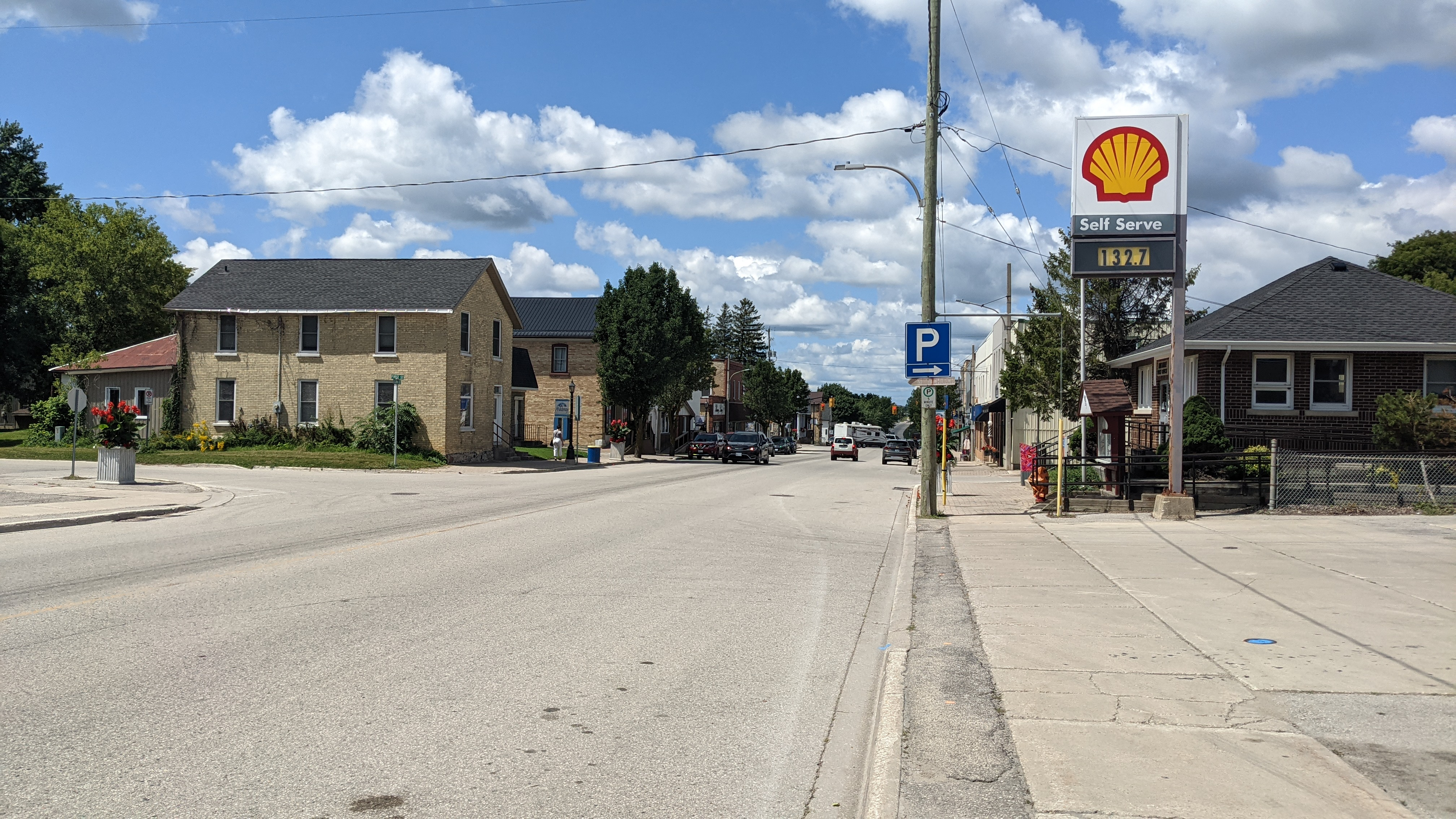

- Location in southern Ontario
- Coordinates: 44°02′32″N 81°07′08″W
- Country: Canada
- Province: Ontario
- County: Bruce County
- Municipality: South Bruce

Area
  - Total: 1.7 km^{2} (0.66 sq mi)

Population (2016)
  - Total: 1,219
- Time zone: UTC-5 (EST)
  - Summer (DST): UTC-4 (EDT)
- Postal code span: N0G
- Area codes: (519) and (226)

Mildmay is a rural community of people of primarily English and German descent in the municipality of South Bruce, Bruce County, Ontario, Canada. it is northwest of Minto and south of Walkerton on Highway 9. Formosa lies to the northwest, and Neustadt to the east. Mildmay was possibly named after "the place in England where the famous Mildmay Evangelical Meetings were held". Post office dates from 1868.

It contains a well stocked grocery store, hardware store, pharmacy, 2 diners/restaurants, a pub as well as many other businesses. Mildmay also has a recreational complex with an arena, a baseball diamond and a few other sport facilities. The town has a park with a playground and many walking trails, a library, a fire station and a few churches of different Christian denominations. Mildmay Veterinary Clinic is a mixed animal practice serving Mildmay and the surrounding area. The population change in Mildmay from 2011 to 2016 was +3.5%.

Shortly before Christmas every year the town has an annual "Hanging of the Green" festival and lighted night parade to celebrate the beginning of the Christmas season, with free apple cider, a live nativity scene, sausages, a Santa, and Christmas carols. Mildmay holds an annual fall fair in September in the Rotary park, as well as many other community events and activities year round,

Mildmay-Carrick Public School and the Sacred Heart Catholic school teach students from kindergarten through grade eight. High school students in Mildmay attend school in Walkerton (a larger town 10 minutes away), which has 2 high schools (Catholic and public).

The town's official mascot is a muskrat named Mildred, after Mildred Westmay, the first person to open a business in Mildmay.

== Media ==
- Mildmay Town Crier - Mildmay's local newspaper, owned by Midwestern Newspapers.
- Cable television is provided by Eastlink TV and Wightman Telecom
- CFBW-FM 91.3 "Bluewater Radio" - Walkerton/Hanover and area local news coverage, weather, and community talk alongside music genres spanning country, blues, bluegrass, oldies (60s–70s), rock, pop, jazz, gospel, folk, Indigenous, and specialty shows
- CKNX-FM 101.7 "The One" - local, regional and national news and adult contemporary music
- CIBU-FM 94.5 "The Bull" - local, regional and national news and classic rock music
- CKNX (AM) 920 - country music

== Bus Transportation ==
- Voyago (buses from Hanover, Ontario) (formerly Kunkel Bus Lines) (for the 2 schools in the same village)
- Montgomery Bus Lines (buses from Wingham, Ontario) (for the 2 schools in the same village)
- Ross Young Bus Lines (buses from Tiverton, Ontario) (serving the Bruce County area)

== Notable people ==
- Owen Riegling, country music singer-songwriter
