= Arthur Tigers =

- City: Arthur, Ontario
- League: WOAA Senior Hockey League
- Operated: 1985-1999
- Home arena: Arthur Area Recreation Complex

The Arthur Tigers were a Canadian senior hockey team based in Arthur, Ontario, Canada. They played in the Western Ontario Athletic Association Senior Hockey League.

== History ==
Arthur has had numerous hockey teams nicknamed the Tigers since 1904 (perhaps as early as 1899), with the most recent team playing in the WOAA from 1985 to 1999. The team folded at the conclusion of the 1998–99 season. Some Championship seasons included: 1929 NHL, 1939 OHA, 1954 Pritchard Trophy, 1972-1975 WOAA, 1989-1991 WOAA Sr B, 1991 WOAA Grand Championship.

Some stars over the years included: Angus O'Neill, Norbert Heffernan, Ken Riley, Al Bell, Ken Elliott, Gord Schmidt, Garnett Rooney, Bob McCulloch, Bryan Richardson, Jim Richardson, Paul Epoch, Scott McCulloch, Tom O'Donnell, Marty Groulx, Bruce Richardson, Ray Hutchison, Mike Brooks, Glenn Watt, Darryl Rooney.

Some of the "Honorary Tigers & Eagles" include: John Walsh, Clive Williams, Bill Smellie, Norbert Heffernan, Angus O'Neill, Fred Locking, Don Tremble, Bruce Weber, Bert Coffey, Grant Rundle and Jeff McKee.

The club held Reunions in 1993, 1998 and 2022. These events attracted up to 250–300 former players, coaches and friends of the Tigers.

The club folded in 1999, after it was unable to form an executive.

=== 1991 Grand Championship ===
The club had their most successful season in 1990–91 season, defeating the heavily favoured Durham Thundercats to become the WOAA Grand Champions. The Tigers captured the WOAA Senior B Championship eliminating Wiarton and Drayton. Posting a 9-1 post-season record. The Grand Championship final went the full five games. Durham won game one 8–1. Game two in Arthur, on Sunday, April 1 was canceled at game time, with the fans already in the Arena, due to a compressor break down. It was rescheduled to the following Tuesday evening, Arthur won 8–2. Durham bounced back to win game three 4–3. Again the Tigers won at home 8–1 to force the fifth and deciding contest of the series. In Durham on Friday, April 12, 1991, a full house turned out. Tied heading into the 3rd period 3-3, the Tigers pulled ahead 6–3. Things appeared well in hand for Arthur. Tenacious Durham winger Scott Betts had other things in mind scoring two goals in the final two minutes to bring the home side within a goal. Arthur held on for the 6–5 victory. Tigers winger John McCabe led all WOAA playoff scorers with 28 points. Netminder Marty Groulx sparkled for Arthur. Other players included: Scott McCulloch, Tom O'Donnell, Ray Hutchison, Eck Palmer Jr., Brian Ward, Jim "The Champ" Holmes, Paul Epoch, Fred Locking, Matt Coffey, John Bell, Don Jackson, Doug Bell, Rob McCulloch, Mike Raftis, Grant Rundle, Brad Smith, Frank Goetz, Jeff Bauman, Mark Goetz III, Walt Lesenke Jr. Coach Don Tremble, Assistant Coach Cal MacDonald, Manager/President Jeff McKee, Trainer Walt Lesenke Sr.

=== Modern era ===
In 1985, the Tigers re-birthed, after a period of seven years of idleness. They spent one season in the OHA before returning to the WOAA. It would take five years, before the team would have some exciting moments. The 1988–89 season saw 10 Juniors in their lineup.

=== The road team ===
In 1977 the Arthur Tigers were a men's hockey club without an arena. Winning was not the highlight of the season, rather the fact that they played all their games on the road was.

=== 1970s ===
The club was extremely strong through the early 1970s. Garnett Rooney won three WOAA scoring titles (1971, 1973, 1975) and Bob McCulloch one (1972). In 1972 the club advanced to the WOAA Grand Championship final, but were eliminated by Milverton in six games. Again in 1975 they advanced to the Grand Championship, but were again defeated. They were also group champions in the 1974. Some of the other team members were: Jim Richardson, Merv Rooney, Carl Colwill, Bryan Richardson, Lorne Green, Carl Nelson, Cal MacDonald, Brent Barnes, Scott Jackson. Coaching staff included Clive B. Williams and Al Bell.

=== 1954 ===
In 1954 the Pritchard Trophy was first presented. Arthur, Harriston and Mount Forest competed in the local WOHA series, with the Arthur Redmen prevailing that first year. Ken Riley was the club's big star and scored more than 57 goals that season. Ken Elliott, Gord Schmidt, Al Bell, Don Black, Bill Pryde, Leo Givens, Ken O'Neill were some of the players. John Walsh was the coach.

=== 1939 ===
The "Beehives", under the direction of player coach Art Whittacker were undefeated during the regular season. In OHA playoffs they extended the streak to 18 games. The 19th game was in Owen Sound, the second game of a two-game total goals series. Owen Sound defeated the "Beehives" in overtime to take the series and eliminate Arthur. Some of the team members were: Angus O'Neill, Norbert Heffernan, Jimmy Doyle, Nate Farrell, Frank Farrell, Sam Green, Bunter Marshall. Marvin Howe, P.E. Brown, and Dr. Russell were some of the other well known members of the club.

=== 1929 ===
The Tigers were NHL champions (Northern Hockey League). Stars included: Angus O'Neill, Norbert Heffernan, Ken Riley and Tom Costigan.

=== 1899-1904 ===
Hockey game results have been found in old newspapers. The first observed team called "Tigers" first appeared with a men's lacrosse team in the early 1900s. Prior to that, a few teams used the nickname "Arthur's". Lacrosse teams first appeared in Arthur about 1870.

=== Ice Rinks ===
The first hockey teams played on an outdoor rink. Location of the rink(s) has not been confirmed. The Tigers first recorded home was at 148 Frederick St. This arena sat close to Georgina St. In 1920 the new arena was built on Domville St. This building was torn down in 1977. The curling club sits on the property today. The current Arthur arena was opened in 1978.

== Rivalries ==
The Tigers had a big rivalry with the Drayton Comets, through the late 1980s and early 1990s. The two towns are located 30 kilometers apart, and the clubs met four times in the playoffs - 1989, 1990, 1991 and 1992. Each club won two series. In 1990 Drayton defeated the Tigers to advance to the WOAA Grand Championship Final. In 1991, Arthur defeated Drayton en route to the WOAA Grand Championship.

Through the 1950s, 1960s and 1970s strong rivalries were formed with Harriston, Palmerston, Mt. Forest and Milverton.

One of the most famous games was played in the mid-1950s in Arthur. A packed house became embroiled in brawl which spilled out onto the ice. Fans leaned against the boards when defenceman Ken Elliott became involved in a fight. The boards slipped off their hooks, and the fans spilled onto the ice, resulting in the melee. Mt. Forest eventually managed to retreat to their dressing room. Police assisted in helping the visitors leave the arena.

== Season-by-season record ==
Note: GP = Games played, W = Wins, L = Losses, T = Ties, OTL = Overtime Losses Pts = Points, GF = Goals for, GA = Goals against

Season	GP	W	L	T	GF	GA	PTS	Finish	Playoffs
1986-87	24	11	12	1	108	126	23	4th WOAA South	Lost Int. B Semi-final, 1-4 (Merchants)
1987-88	16	2	14	0	71	121	4	8th WOAA South	Lost Int. B Final, 0-4 (Wildcats)
1988-89	19	1	17	1	72	150	3	6th WOAA South	Lost Int. B Final, 0-3 (Crusaders)
1989-90	21	10	8	3	138	115	23	4th WOAA South	Won Sr. B Final, 4-0 (Flyers); Lost Grand Championship Semi-Final, 3-4 (Comets)
1990-91	24	11	9	4	151	126	26	4th WOAA South	Won Sr. B Semi-Final, 3-0 (Flyers); Won Sr. B Final, 3-0 (Redmen); Won Grand Championship Semi-Final, 3-1 (Comets); Won Grand Championship Final, 3-2 (Thundercats)
1991-92	26	13	13	0	116	131	26	5th WOAA Sr. A	Lost Sr. A Quarter-Final, 2-3 (Comets)
1992-93	24	8	15	1	102	147	17	5th WOAA Sr. A	Won Sr. A Quarter-Final, 3-2 (Comets); Lost Sr. A Semi-Final, 0-4 (Thundercats)
1993-94	20	7	10	3	95	101	17	8th WOAA Sr. A	Lost Sr. A Quarter-Final, 2-4 (Thundercats)
1994-95	24	9	14	1	116	165	19	9th WOAA Sr. A	Won Sr. A Semi-Final, 4-1 (81's); Lost Sr. A Final, 1-4 (Redmen)
1995-96	24	9	14	1	129	151	19	6th WOAA Sr. A	Lost Sr. A Quarter-Final, 0-4 (Crusaders)
1996-97	24	12	11	1	159	151	25	6th WOAA Sr. A	Lost Sr. A Quarter-Final, 3-4 (Pirates)
1997-98	24	6	16	2	125	162	14	4th WOAA Sr. A East	Won Sr. A Preliminary Round, 2-0 (Flyers); Lost Sr. A Quarter-Final, 2-4 (Muskies)
1998-99	23	7	14	2	114	171	16	5th WOAA Sr. A East	Won Sr. A Preliminary Round, 2-0 (Monarchs); Lost Sr. A Quarter-Final, 1-4 (81's)

== See also ==
- Arthur, Ontario
- Western Ontario Athletic Association
- WOAA Senior Hockey League
