= Mildmay Monarchs =

- City: Mildmay, Ontario
- League: WOAA Senior Hockey League
- Division: North
- Founded: 1946
- Folded: 2007
- Home arena: Mildmay Carrick Recreation Complex

The Mildmay Monarchs were a senior hockey team based out of Mildmay, Ontario, Canada. They played in the Western Ontario Athletic Association Senior Hockey League.

== Championships ==
The Monarchs, who played in the WOAA from 2003–2007, never won a WOAA Championship, and no previous Mildmay team has ever been WOAA champions either.

Mildmay's teams has won at least 15 Ontario Hockey Association and Ontario Minor Hockey Association championships since 1955.

The First Monarchs were formed in 1946, and over the years there have been many different versions of the Mildmay Monarchs.

== 2006–07 Monarchs season ==
Mildmay finished in 7th place in the North Division with a 6-16-2 record. The Monarchs then faced off against the Wingham Bulls in the opening round of the "A" playoffs, and were swept in 4 games, ending their season.

== Folding ==
The Monarchs intended to ice a team for the 2007-08 season, and were included when the schedule was made, however, just before the season began, the team announced they were folding due to a lack of players.

== Season-by-season record ==
Note: GP = Games played, W = Wins, L = Losses, T= Tie, OTL = Overtime Losses, Pts = Points, GF = Goals for, GA = Goals against

Season	GP	W	L	T	OTL	GF	GA	PTS	Finish	Playoffs
2003-04	24	5	19	0	0	68	155	10	15th WOAA Sr	
2004-05	25	7	15	1	2	81	138	17	12th WOAA Sr	
2005-06	25	5	18	-	2	80	125	12	15th WOAA Sr	Lost "A" QF
2006-07	24	6	16	-	2	91	138	14	7th WOAA North	Lost "A" QF

== Related links ==
- Mildmay, Ontario
- Western Ontario Athletic Association
- WOAA Senior Hockey League
