= Petkoff =

Petkoff is a surname. Notable people with the surname include:

- Damián Petkoff (born 1990), Argentine footballer
- Drew Petkoff (born 1985), Canadian lacrosse player
- Robert Petkoff (born 1963), American actor
- Teodoro Petkoff (1932–2018), Venezuelan politician, guerrilla, economist, and journalist
