= George Leith =

George Leith may refer to:

- George Alexander William Leith (1766–1842), Lieutenant-Governor of Prince of Wales' Island (later Penang Island)
- George Leith of the Leith-Buchanan baronets
- George Gordon Leith (1923–1996), politician in Saskatchewan, Canada
- Gordon Leith (architect) (George Esslemont Gordon Leith, 1885–1965), South African architect
