= Elora, Ontario =

Elora
- Unincorporated community
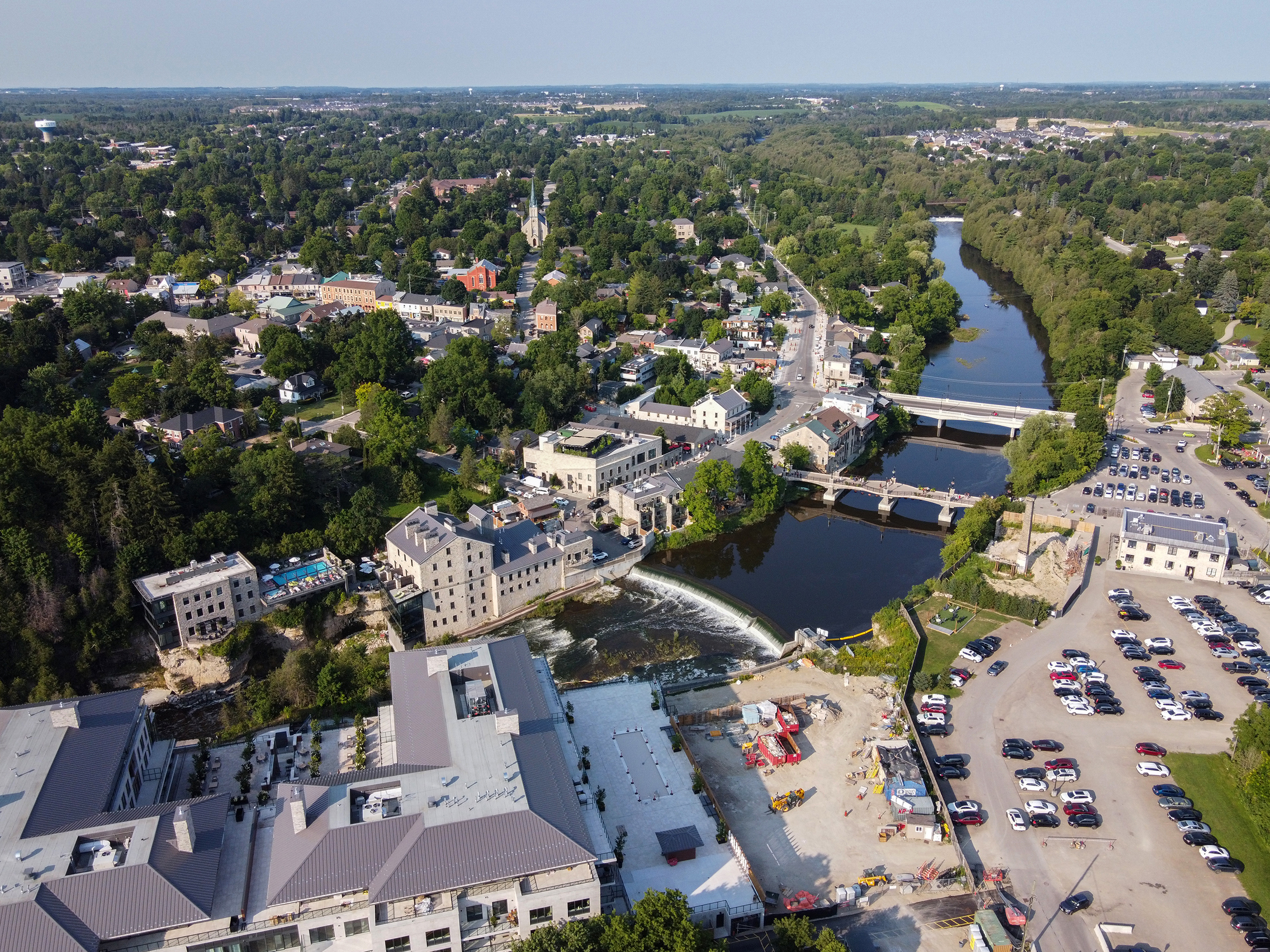
- Aerial view of Elora in 2024
- Motto: "Tempus Rerum Imperator" (Latin) "Time, commander of (all) matters"
- Location within Ontario Location within Canada
- Coordinates: 43°41′06″N 80°25′38″W
- Country: Canada
- Province: Ontario
- County: Wellington County
- Township: Centre Wellington

Population (2011)
  - Total: 7,756 (estimated)
- Time zone: UTC−05:00 (EST)
  - Summer (DST): UTC−04:00 (EDT)
- Forward sortation area: N0B 1S0
- Area codes: 519 ,226 and 548
- NTS Map: 40P9 Guelph
- GNBC Code: FCICM

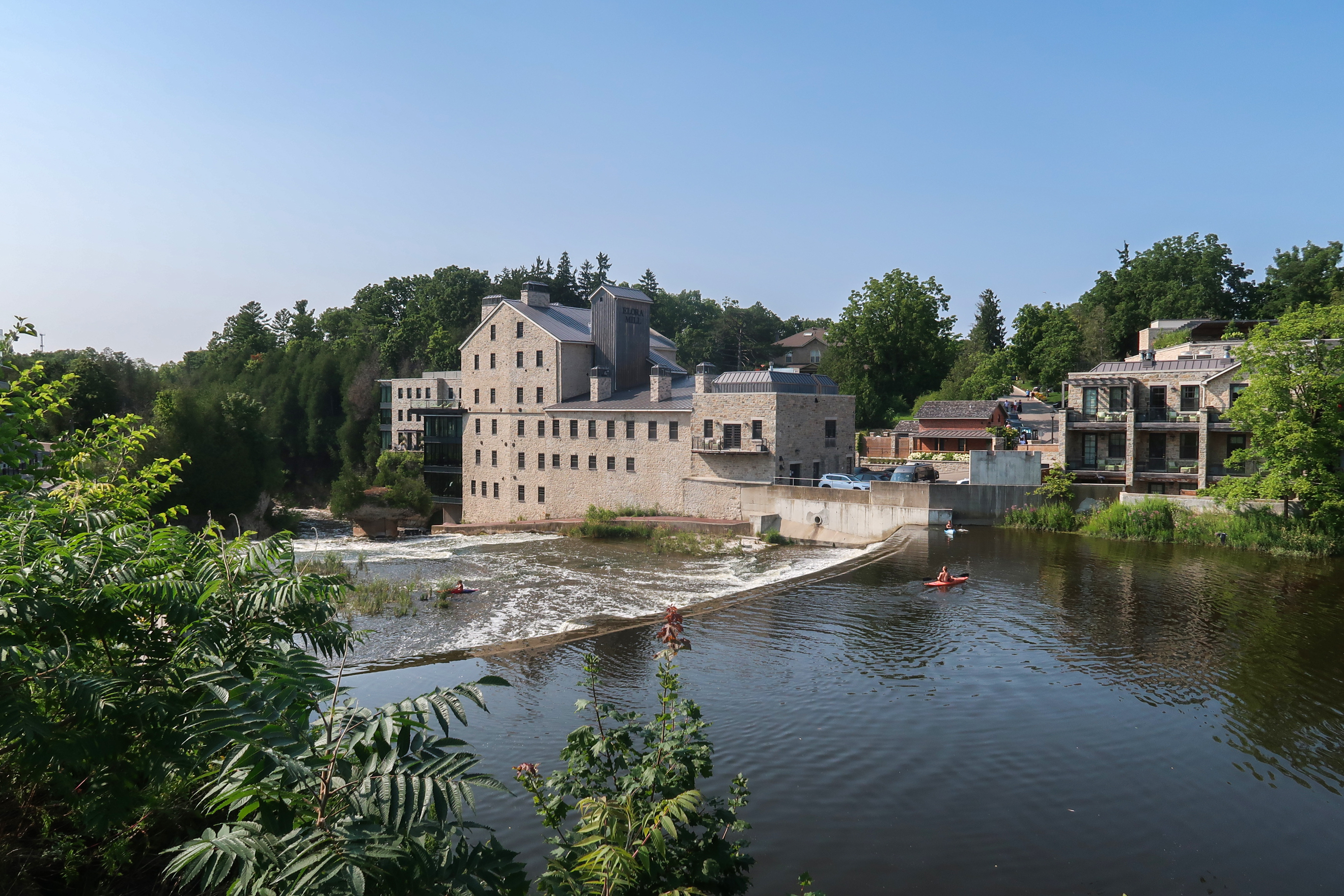
The 1832 mill in 2024; it has since been restored to a luxury Inn

The Historic Village of Elora is a community in the township of Centre Wellington (Wellington County) in the Province of Ontario, Canada. It is well known for its 19th-century limestone architecture and its geographically, historically, and culturally significant limestone gorge.

Elora is no longer an incorporated municipality in its own right, although it is the seat of the municipal government that succeeded it. The Township of Centre Wellington was formed in 1999 when, on the advice of the Province, the County amalgamated the Town of Fergus; the Village of Elora; and the surrounding townships of Nichol, Pilkington, and West Garafraxa (along with the northwestern part of Eramosa.) The decision — along with the Ontario government’s role therein — remains highly controversial among Elora’s inhabitants.

In 2011, the village was estimated to have had a population of approximately 7,756.

== History ==
Roman Catholic missionaries first visited the area in the early to mid-1600s, attempting to Christianize the indigenous people, particularly the Neutral Nation on the Attiwandaronk Lands. The first European settlers arrived in 1817, and Roswell Matthews built a home here the next year.

Captain William Gilkison founded Elora in 1832. Originally from Ayrshire, Scotland, Gilkison emigrated to North America in 1796, was recently returned from India, and had served in the War of 1812, fighting the nascent United States. He bought 14,000 acres of land on the Grand River and settled on the east side of the river. The plan for the settlement was laid out by Lewis Burwell, deputy provincial land surveyor, late in 1832. By his death in April 1833, Gilkison had opened a sawmill and a general store. The name "Elora" was taken from Gilkison's brother's ship, which was itself inspired by the Ellora Caves near Aurangabad, Maharashtra, India.

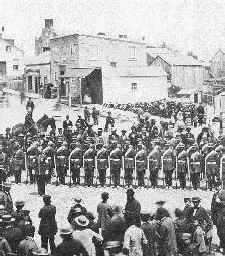
Voluntary regiment in May 1862 in Elora, Ontario. The army consisted of 30,000 men in 1870, intended to defend Canada against a possible attack from the United States

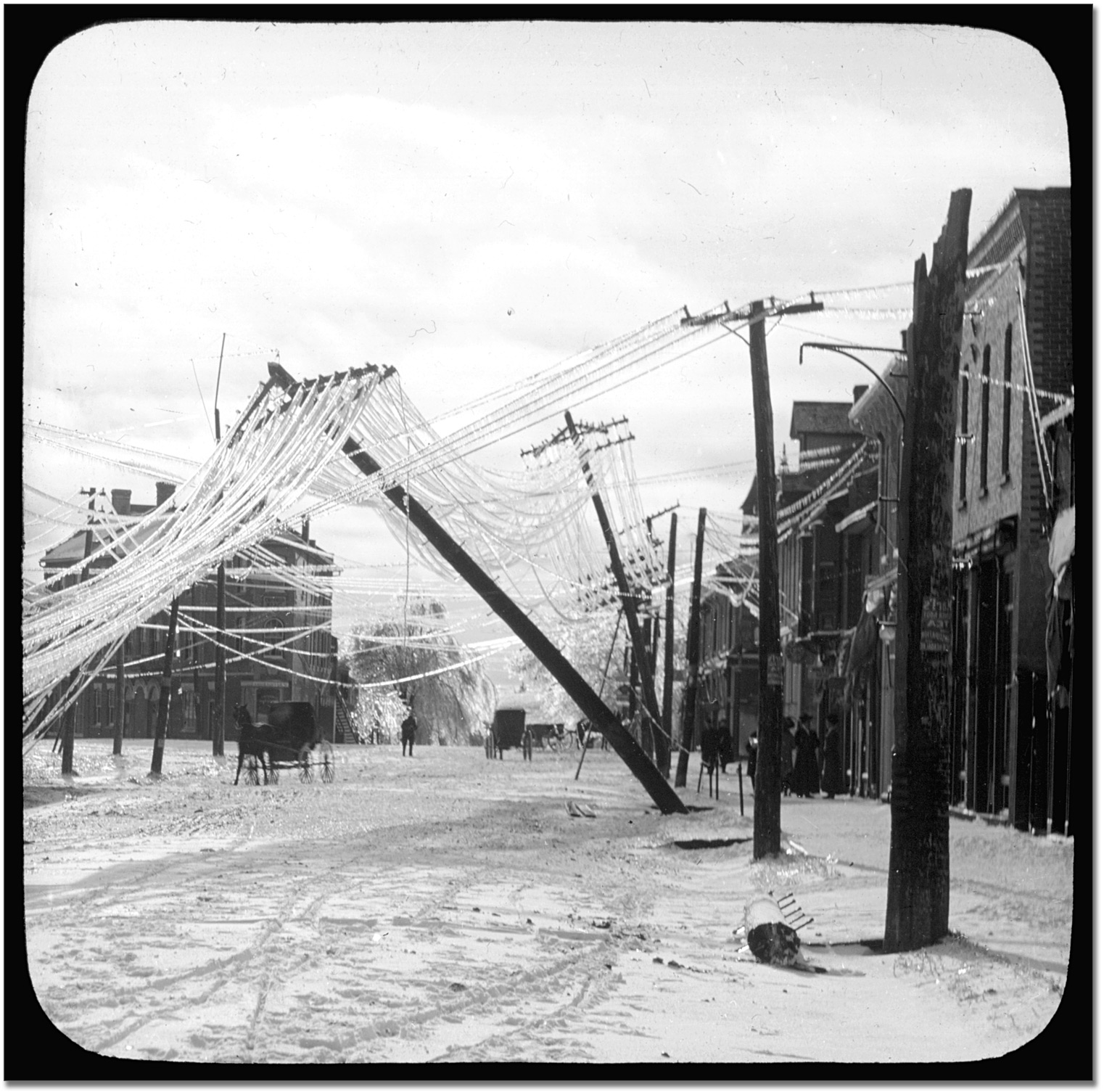
A street in Elora after an ice storm; early 1900s.

Charles Allan and Andrew Geddes laid out a town site on the west side of the river. By 1848, village lots were being sold, and the settlement was incorporated into a village in 1858. The commercial area was near the grist mill, by the waterfalls (Mill St.), and eventually moved further up the hill.

The Smith's Canadian Gazetteer of 1846 describes Elora as having beautiful waterfalls and a deep channel carved by the river in the limestone rock. At the time, there were only 100 inhabitants but two churches, three mills, and a post office. Otherwise, there were a few tradespeople and a single tavern.

In the 1850s and 1860s, Elora was a major agricultural marketplace. Stores in the downtown area sold a wide range of goods. The flour mill and saw were powered by the Grand River. In 1869, the population was 1,500. By 1870, several other mills, two distilleries, a carpet factory, a tannery, and two furniture factories were operating. While there were some earlier private providers of electricity on a small scale, more extensive provision of power, by Ontario Hydropower, began in 1914.

=== Elora Mill ===
The extant five-storey Elora grist mill was built in 1832 and, over its history, housed a sawmill, distillery, and flour mill. In the 1970s, it became the Elora Mill Inn, which closed in 2010. Plans were submitted to convert the building to condominiums and a hotel, and in 2017 a report stated "Elora Mill Inn and Spa, a $120 million project expected to bring a world class resort and 250 jobs to the area when it opens in Spring 2018. Following a $27 million renovation, the Elora Mill Hotel and Spa, owned by Pearle Hospitality, opened in July 2018, employing 170 people and featuring 30 rooms and a restaurant. Construction of the condominium section of the property was to begin in 2019.

In February 2020, the property was awarded a Heritage Recognition Award by Heritage Centre Wellington.

=== David Street (Irvine Creek) bridge ===
David Street Bridge
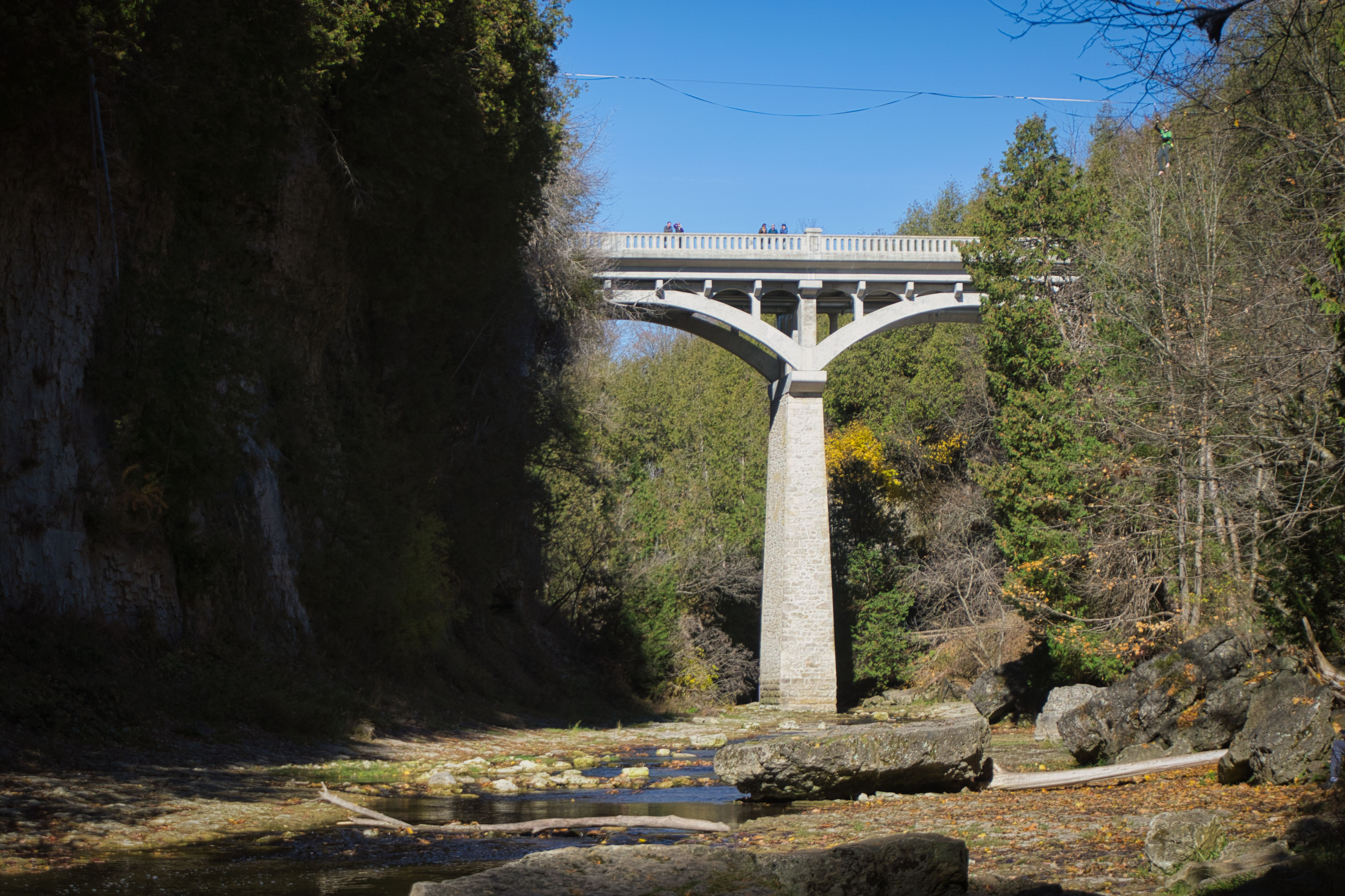
- One of Elora's many tourist attractions, the gorge also has the architecturally significant David St. Bridge; it was saved from destruction by active citizens.
- Coordinates: 43°41′06″N 80°25′38″W
- Carries: traffic along David Street West
- Crosses: Irvine Creek

Characteristics
- Material: Concrete
- No. of spans: 1

History
- Opened: 2004

Location
- Interactive map of David Street Bridge

In 2002, the Township of Centre Wellington announced that, for safety reasons, it would demolish the historically significant David Street Bridge over Irvine Creek. The structure and its pier had been built in 1868 by Charles Lawrence, a stonemason. The structure was "the first cantilever bridge in North America". (A more modest earlier bridge had been built over the Irvine Creek in 1848.) It is described as one of the few remaining open-spandrel concrete arch bridges and is listed in the Ontario Heritage Bridge Program. Concerned about the preservation of Elora's culturally significant architecture, the group Elora Heritage was founded. They received over 1,000 names on a petition. They met with representatives from the town council as well as the provincial and federal governments.

It became apparent that the bridge was beyond preservation; however, the council agreed to preserve the pier and build a replica bridge in 2004. The project presented numerous engineering challenges, but was completed. The current structure is similar to the 1921 bridge; the 1867 stone pier was retained as had been planned.

==== Victoria Street Bridge ====
Victoria Street Bridge
- Coordinates: 43°41′06″N 80°25′38″W
- Carries: pedestrian traffic west of Metcalfe Street
- Crosses: Grand River

Characteristics
- Material: Concrete
- Total length: 62.7 metres (206 ft)
- No. of spans: 1

History
- Opened: Late 2019

Location
- Interactive map of Victoria Street Bridge

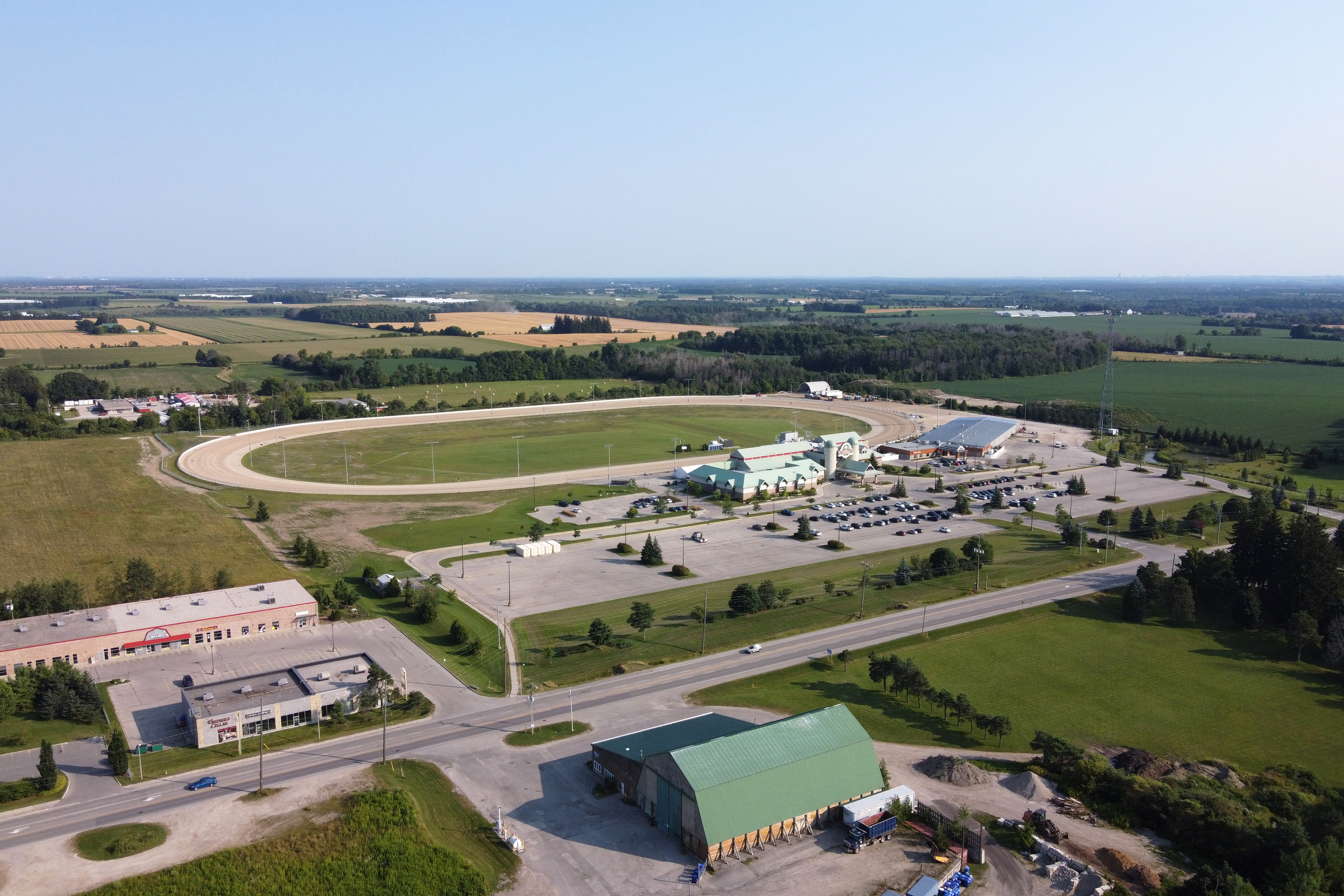
Elements Casino Grand River in 2024

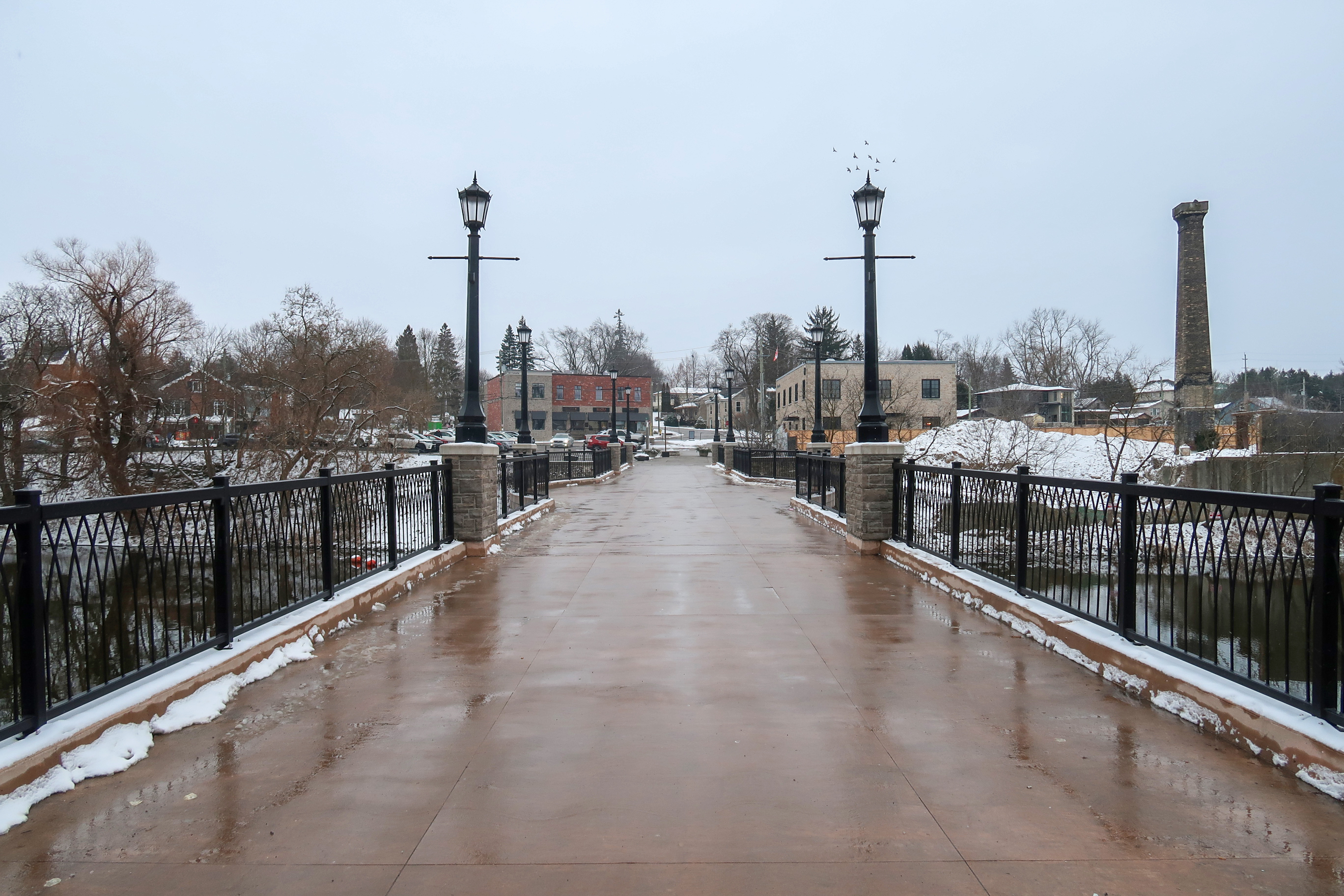
The new pedestrian bridge in 2020

Most parts of another bridge over the river, known as the Victoria Street Pedestrian Bridge, had been demolished years ago. Still, it was being rebuilt in 2019 as part of the downtown redevelopment.

The first Victoria Street Bridge over the Grand River was built in 1843, again in 1871, and lastly as a Pratt truss bridge in 1899. The latest structure, a non-truss concrete beam pedestrian bridge with decorative railings and stone cladding mimicking an arch below, replaced the previous structure, which was demolished in 2006. Named for Jack R. MacDonald, the new bridge opened in November 2019 and allows for increased pedestrian access into the core.!

==== Metcalfe Badley Bridge ====
Metcalfe (Badley) Street Bridge
- Coordinates: 43°41′06″N 80°25′38″W
- Carries: traffic along Metcalfe Street
- Crosses: Grand River

Characteristics
- Material: Steel and concrete
- Total length: 71.93 metres (236.0 ft)
- Width: 7.32 metres (24.0 ft)
- No. of spans: 1

History
- Constructed by: A.H. MacLellan and Hamilton Bridge Company
- Construction start: 1952
- Construction end: 1953
- Opened: 1953

Location
- Interactive map of Metcalfe (Badley) Street Bridge

The Metcalfe Street (Badley) Bridge (c. 1952-1953) is the main vehicular bridge with direct access into town. The Parker Through truss bridge has been assessed as being in a poor state and would be closed for repairs or replacement. The new bridge will not be a truss bridge to accommodate vehicles, cyclists, and pedestrians. The scope of the Victoria St. project was described as:

Construction of the bridge deck concrete topping and side curbs, masonry pilasters, steel framing and arched masonry stone side skirts along the bridge, steel railings, electrical, lighting and the finished piazza concrete slab, retaining wall, storm sewer extension and planting beds.

A report in April 2020 indicated that benefits included "wider traffic lanes and sidewalks, two new bike lanes, an expanded observation deck, enhanced lighting, limestone gateway piers". The reconstructed bridge opened on 18 December 2020.

=== From "poorhouse" to museum ===
In 1877, the County opened the Wellington County House of Industry and Refuge, or Poorhouse as it was called, on Wellington Road 18 between Fergus and Elora. Over the years, approximately 1500 "deserving" poor, including those who were destitute, old and infirm, or suffering from disabilities, were housed here. The sixty-bed house for "inmates" was surrounded by a 30-acre "industrial" farm with a barn for livestock that produced some of the food for the 70 residents and the staff, and also provided work for them. Others worked in the House itself. According to a 2009 report by the Toronto Star, "pauperism was considered a moral failing that could be erased through order and hard work". A hospital was added in 1892. A nearby cemetery has 271 plots for those who died. In 1947 the House was converted into the Wellington County Home for the Aged and in 1975 the building reopened as the Wellington County Museum and Archives.

A historic plaque was erected at the museum, indicating that the "government-supported poorhouse" was "the shelter of last resort for the homeless and destitute, who traded spartan accommodations for domestic or agricultural labour".

== Raceway and slots controversy ==
In 2000, a proposal was made to build a standardbred horse racing track with slot machines in Elora, creating the Grand River Raceway. The plan became the subject of much debate. The Centre Wellington Citizens Coalition was formed in opposition to the race track, primarily because of the inclusion of gambling facilities. The township council voted 4–3 to approve the opening. It ended in a 3–3 tie, and the mayor at the time voted in favour. The Grand River Raceway eventually opened in Elora in 2002, with Slots At Grand River Raceway offering 200 slot machines operated by the Ontario Lottery and Gaming Corporation (OLG).

Grand River Raceway is owned and operated by the Grand River Agricultural Society (G.R.A.S.), a not-for-profit corporation, incorporated under the Agricultural Societies Act of Ontario and operated by a volunteer board of directors. The Society operates the racetrack and other facilities. It leases space to the OLG for the slot machines; the OLG is the operator and employer for the slot operation. In 2009, the business paid $1.6 million in taxes, and the OLG paid the Township an additional $1.78 million, being a share of the profits.

A plan for substantial expansion, approved by the Township Council in February 2017, will include gaming tables (up to 52) and many additional slot machines (up to 1,200 in total). Some councillors were strongly opposed to the plan. The rationale for the majority decision was the revenue benefit; since the slots opened, the Township has received over $22 million from the currently small operation.

== Tourism ==
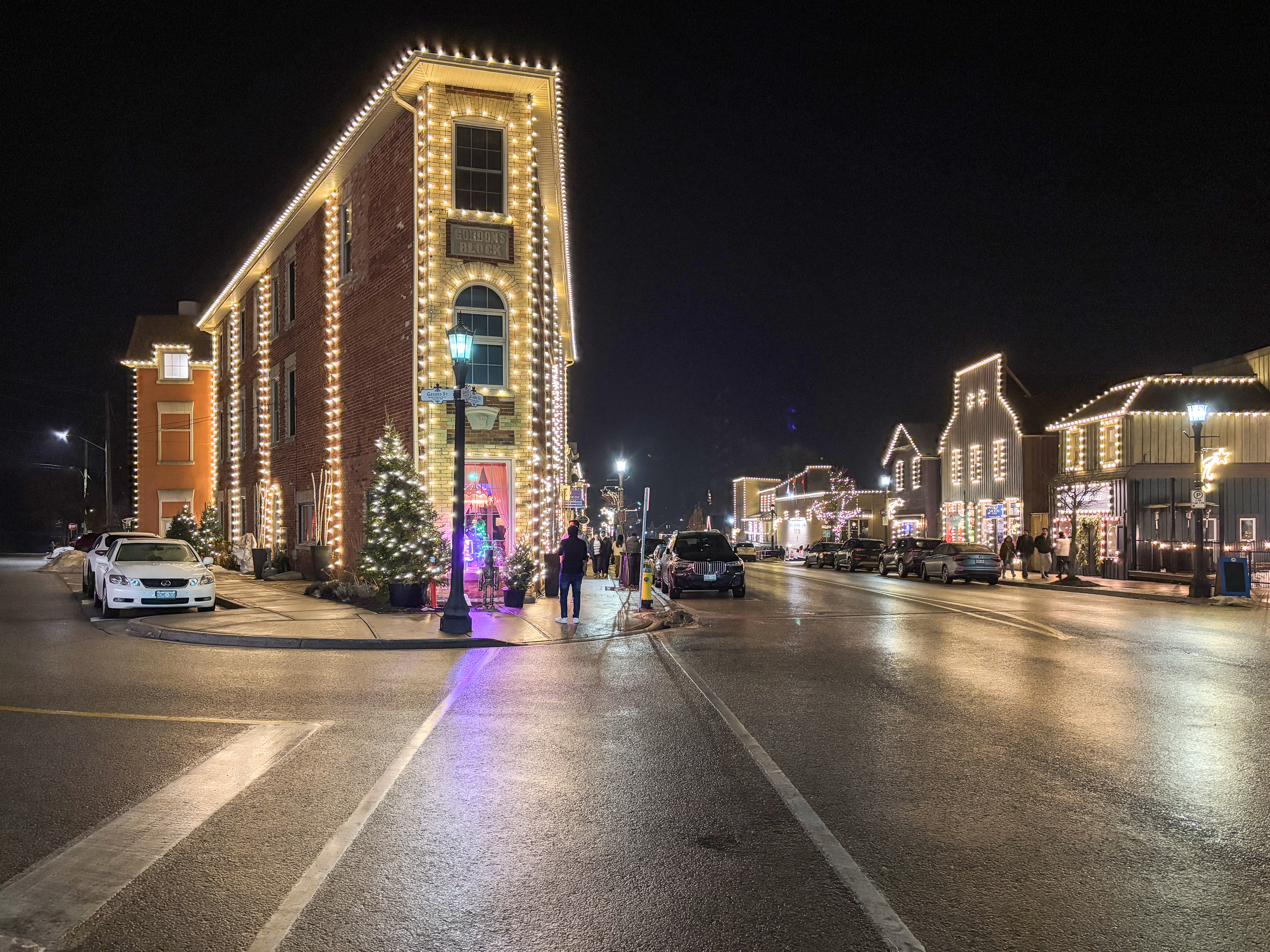
Dalby House during Christmas in 2024

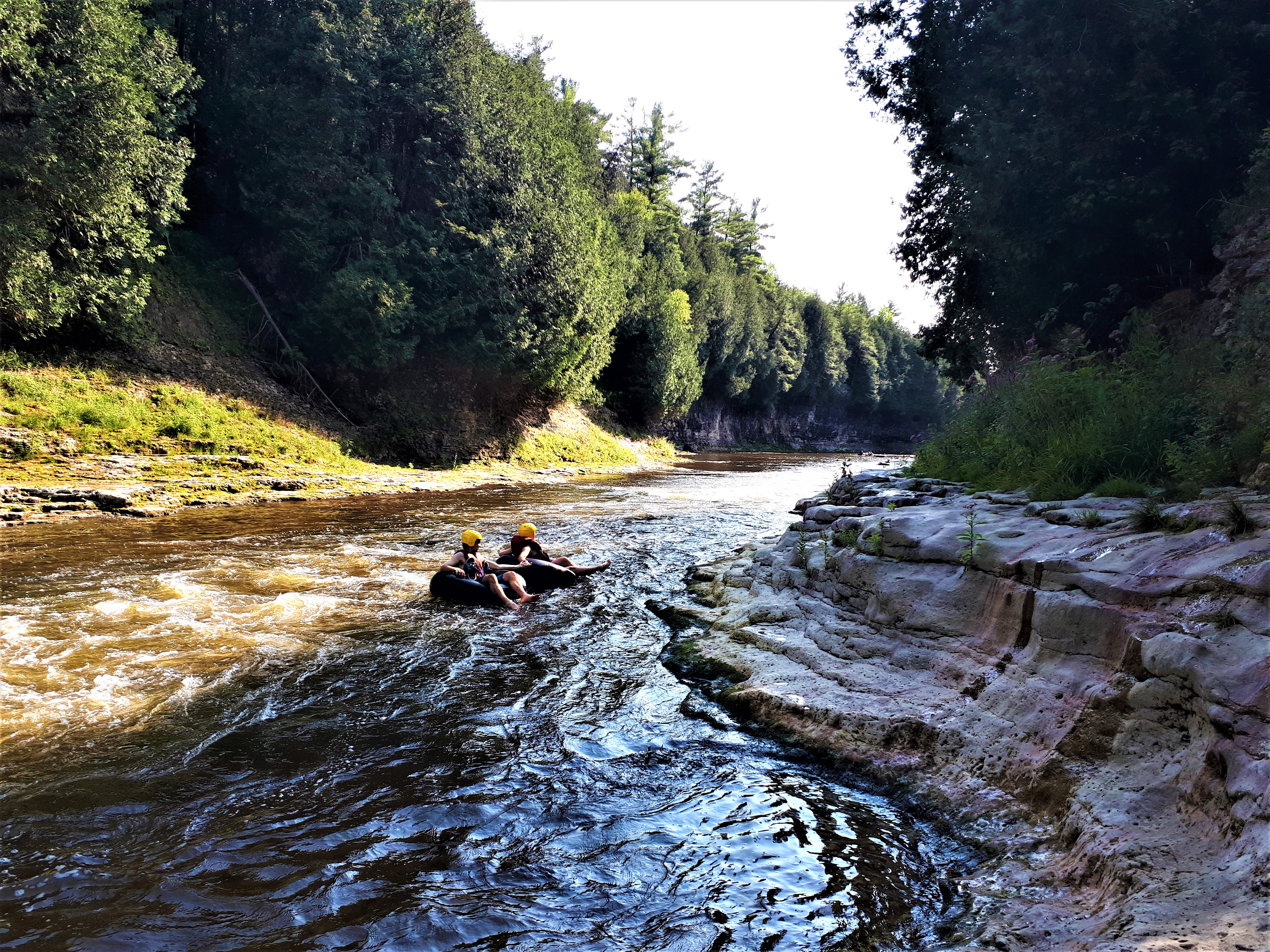
Tubing in Elora Gorge Conservation Area

Many tourists visit Elora on day trips, drawn by the town's historic character or the Grand River Raceway, which hosts horse racing and slot machines. It has many small shops, pubs, cafés, restaurants, and art galleries. These are often in buildings built in the mid-19th century. The Gorge Cinema is Canada's oldest continuously running repertory theatre. The annual Elora Festival & Singers event is particularly popular.

The Elora Gorge and its Conservation Area are at the edge of town. The park offers canoeing, paddleboat rentals, hiking, campgrounds, fishing, and picnicking. Some of the limestone cliffs are 12 metres (40 feet) high. At the eastern end of the village is the Elora Quarry Conservation Area, a scenic former limestone quarry, which is now a popular swimming area.

In 2001, a group of citizens organized an arts and cultural centre, the Elora Centre for the Arts, at the site of a century-old school whose headmaster, at one time, was David Boyle, well known as an educator in the late 1800s.

The County of Wellington has an active historical society and operates the Wellington County Museum and Archives in a historic stone building in Aboyne, halfway between Elora and Fergus, Ontario. This two-storey Italianate-style stone building was the oldest known state-supported poorhouse or almshouse in Canada, called the House of Industry and Refuge when it opened in 1877. The museum opened in 1975, and the building was designated a National Historic Site of Canada in 1995.

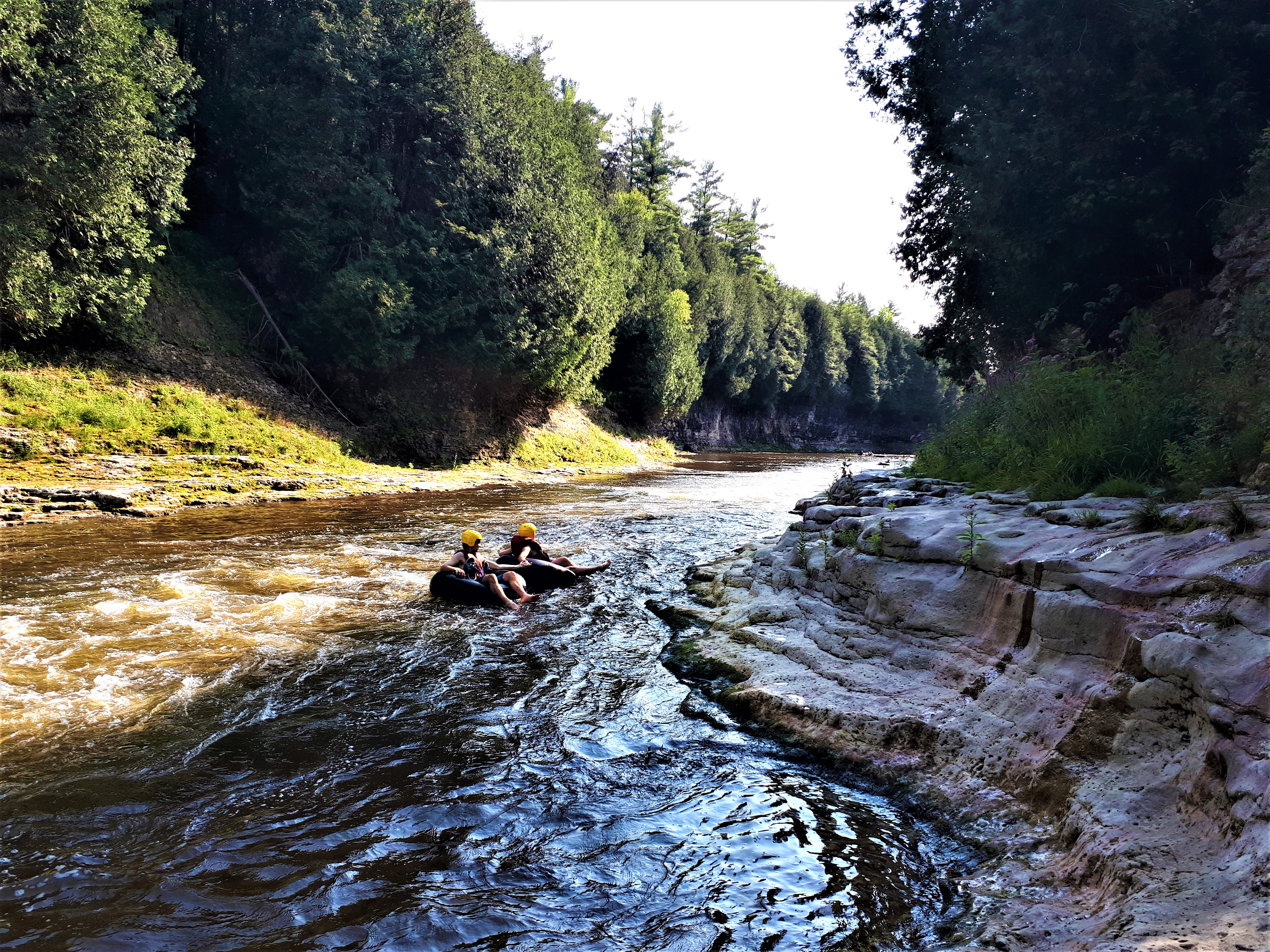
Tubing in Elora Gorge Conservation Area

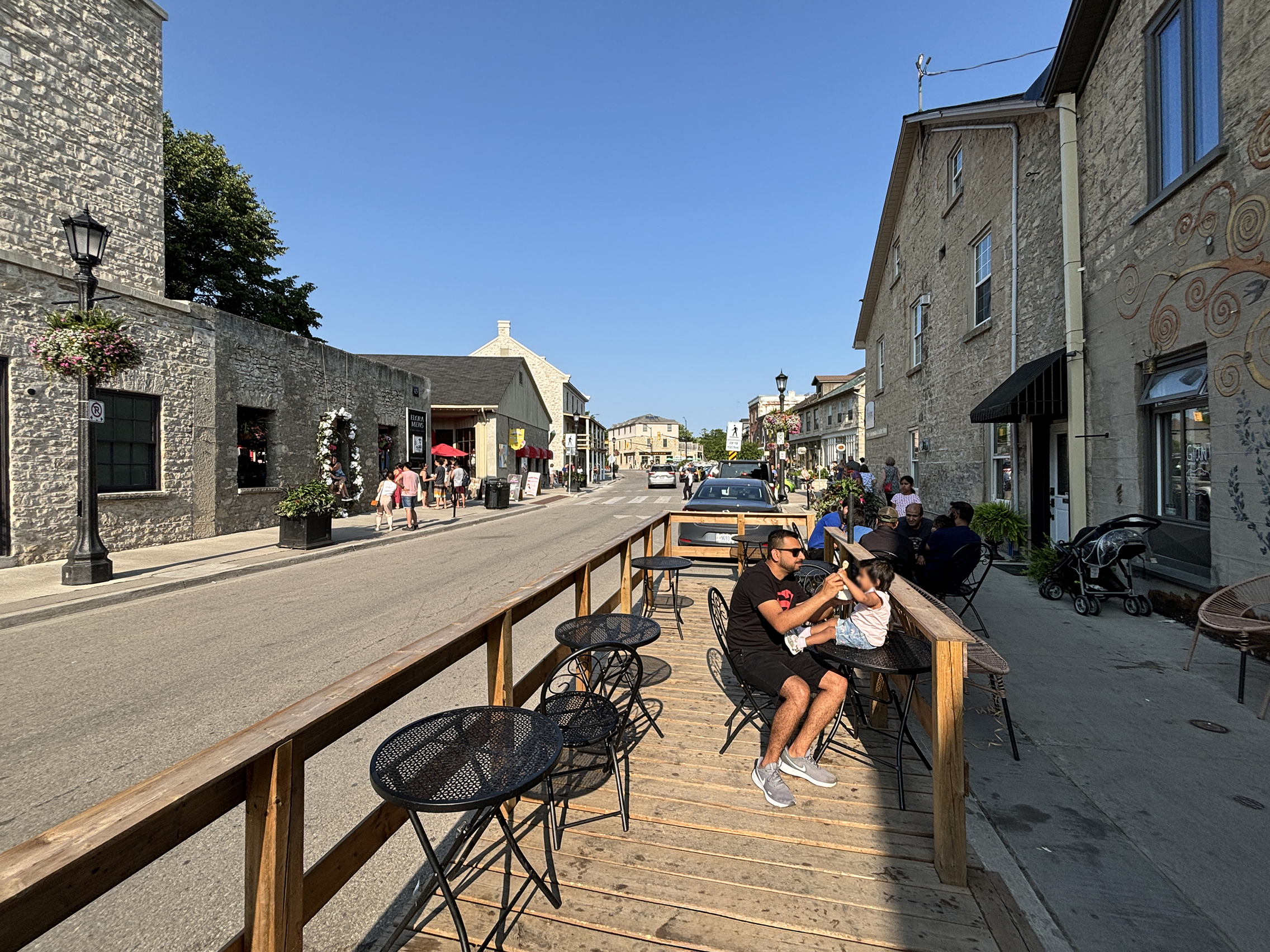
Mill Street West

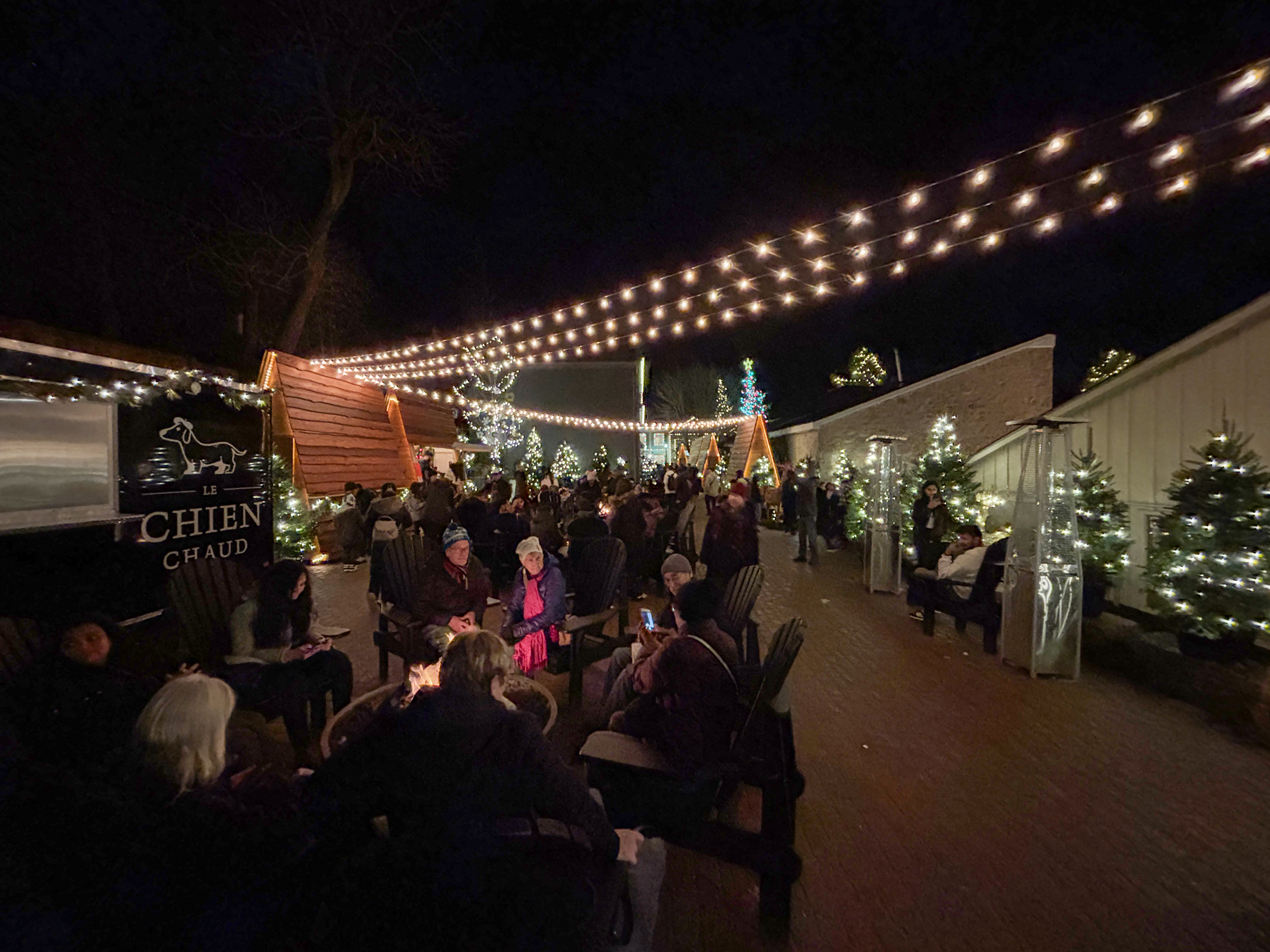
Elora in Christmas (2024)

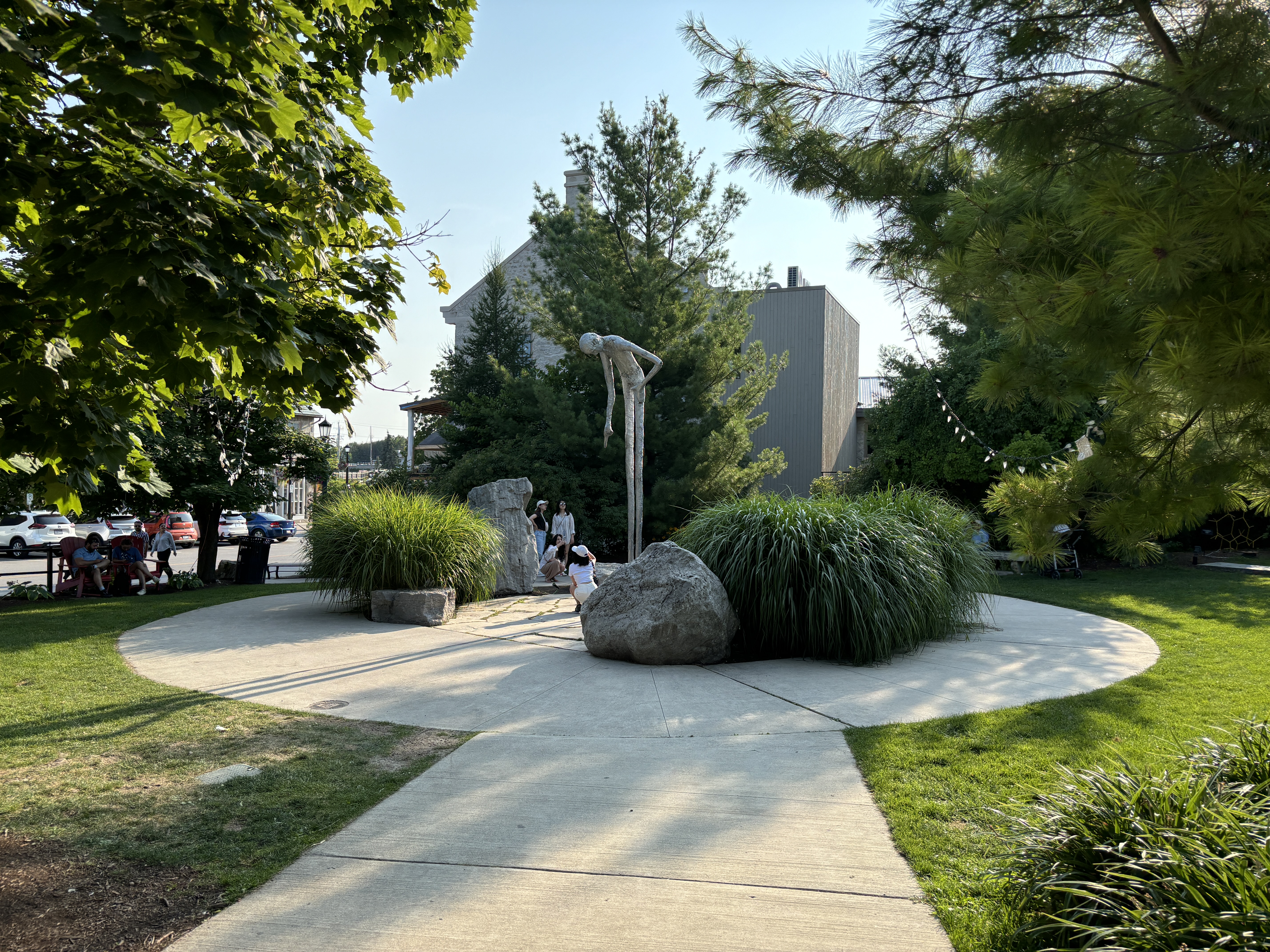
Harold Chamberlain Park

== Climate ==
Elora has a humid continental climate (Dfb) under the Köppen climate classification with cold winters and warm summers.

Climate data for Fergus (1981−2010)
Month	Jan	Feb	Mar	Apr	May	Jun	Jul	Aug	Sep	Oct	Nov	Dec	Year
Record high °C (°F)	15.6 (60.1)	12.0 (53.6)	23.9 (75.0)	29.0 (84.2)	32.0 (89.6)	34.0 (93.2)	35.5 (95.9)	35.0 (95.0)	35.0 (95.0)	28.9 (84.0)	24.4 (75.9)	17.5 (63.5)	35.5 (95.9)
Mean daily maximum °C (°F)	−3.6 (25.5)	−2.1 (28.2)	2.6 (36.7)	10.4 (50.7)	17.5 (63.5)	22.8 (73.0)	25.2 (77.4)	24.2 (75.6)	19.8 (67.6)	12.7 (54.9)	5.4 (41.7)	−0.7 (30.7)	11.2 (52.2)
Daily mean °C (°F)	−7.4 (18.7)	−6.3 (20.7)	−1.9 (28.6)	5.7 (42.3)	12.2 (54.0)	17.5 (63.5)	20.0 (68.0)	19.0 (66.2)	14.9 (58.8)	8.3 (46.9)	2.1 (35.8)	−3.9 (25.0)	6.7 (44.1)
Mean daily minimum °C (°F)	−11.1 (12.0)	−10.5 (13.1)	−6.5 (20.3)	0.9 (33.6)	6.9 (44.4)	12.2 (54.0)	14.7 (58.5)	13.8 (56.8)	9.9 (49.8)	3.9 (39.0)	−1.2 (29.8)	−7.1 (19.2)	2.2 (36.0)
Record low °C (°F)	−35 (−31)	−32.8 (−27.0)	−31.7 (−25.1)	−18.9 (−2.0)	−6.1 (21.0)	−0.6 (30.9)	2.2 (36.0)	−0.6 (30.9)	−5 (23)	−11.7 (10.9)	−18.3 (−0.9)	−34.4 (−29.9)	−35 (−31)
Average precipitation mm (inches)	67.9 (2.67)	55.9 (2.20)	59.6 (2.35)	74.1 (2.92)	86.9 (3.42)	83.8 (3.30)	89.2 (3.51)	96.6 (3.80)	93.1 (3.67)	77.2 (3.04)	93.0 (3.66)	68.6 (2.70)	945.7 (37.23)
Average rainfall mm (inches)	27.8 (1.09)	25.3 (1.00)	36.7 (1.44)	67.9 (2.67)	86.8 (3.42)	83.8 (3.30)	89.2 (3.51)	96.6 (3.80)	93.1 (3.67)	75.6 (2.98)	80.5 (3.17)	34.7 (1.37)	797.8 (31.41)
Average snowfall cm (inches)	40.1 (15.8)	30.6 (12.0)	22.9 (9.0)	6.2 (2.4)	0.1 (0.0)	0.0 (0.0)	0.0 (0.0)	0.0 (0.0)	0.0 (0.0)	1.6 (0.6)	12.5 (4.9)	33.9 (13.3)	147.8 (58.2)
Average precipitation days (≥ 0.2 mm)	19.7	14.9	14.0	14.6	14.4	12.0	11.5	12.4	13.9	16.5	17.4	18.3	179.5
Average rainy days (≥ 0.2 mm)	4.7	4.5	7.4	12.9	14.3	12.0	11.5	12.4	13.9	16.3	13.1	6.8	129.7
Average snowy days (≥ 0.2 cm)	16.5	11.8	8.2	2.8	0.15	0.0	0.0	0.0	0.0	0.73	5.6	13.2	59.0
Source: Environment Canada

== Geography ==
Elora is situated on the Grand River, approximately 20 km (12 mi) north of Guelph, and 20 km (12 mi) northeast of Kitchener-Waterloo.

== Demographics ==
The Canada 2001 Census was the last Canadian census to record Elora as a separate community. In the Canada 2006 Census, demographic statistics were published only for Centre Wellington.

According to the Canada 2001 Census:

Population:	3,796 (+13.4% from 1996)
Land area:	3.54 km^{2}
Population density:	1,072.3 people/km^{2}
Median age:	39.1 (males: 37.4, females: 39.1)
Total private dwellings:	1,447
Mean household income:	$29,473

Data extrapolated from the 2011 Canada Census indicates that Elora had a population of about 7,756 at the time.

No data for this community were available in the 2016 census, but the population of the entire Centre Wellington Township was 28,191, including Fergus, which had a population of 20,767 at that time.

== Local government ==
The Centre Wellington Township council includes a Mayor (Shawn Watters) and six councillors. Three of the latter live in Fergus, while one lives in Elora. The Township is also represented on the County of Wellington Council, which comprises seven mayors and nine councillors.

== Economy ==
Centre Wellington is heavily agricultural but also home to industries, manufacturers, retailers, health care services, and tradespeople. The local economy also benefits greatly from tourism. Data is not available for Elora alone but at the time of the 2011 Census, 6.4% of the workforce of Centre Wellington was involved in agriculture and other resource-based industries/utilities, 24.8% in manufacturing and construction, 19.8% in health and education and 13.2% in wholesale and retail trade. The top three categories for employment (in order of importance) were manufacturing, Healthcare, and Agriculture. The major employers in the township include Jefferson Elora Corp., Nexans Canada, Polycorp Ltd., Groves Memorial Hospital, Wellington Terrace, and PR Donnelly.

Centre Wellington encourages the filming of movies and TV shows; quite a few productions have taken advantage of the historic look of Fergus, and especially Elora, for location work. In 2016, parts of the 10-part miniseries, Canada: The Story of Us, were filmed in Elora which was a stand-in for scenes of WW II skirmishes in Holland and France.

The Elora Quarry was used to film a couple of scenes in the movie Angel Eyes, and for a scene for the 2017 movie It. The Elora Quarry and nearby West Montrose Covered Bridge were also featured in It. Parts of the Grand River in both Elora and Fergus were the site for some of the scenes filmed for the 1994 movie Trapped in Paradise. Other productions have also done filming in Elora, including the 1979 TV movie, An American Christmas Carol,According to Centre Wellington, Elora or Fergus was also featured in: Lars and the Real Girl (2007), Dead Silence (2007) and Mrs. Soffel (1984).

== Sports ==
An Elora Mohawks game in 2024.

Elora has a very active lawn bowling club that offers programs for all ages. The Elora Rocks Lawn Bowling Club is a member of District 7 of the Ontario Lawn Bowling Association, and more information about the club may be found on the District website.

Elora is also home to the Elora Mohawks lacrosse team, the Elora Rocks hockey team.

At the community level, Elora also has a skating club, a curling club, a girls' hockey team (Grand River Mustangs), a minor hockey team (Centre Wellington Fusion), soccer (Fergus-Elora District Soccer), a ringette team, and a few baseball teams, as well as several other sports clubs and organizations.

== Notable people ==
=== Actors ===
- Colin Fox (1938 – 2025), known for his role as Professor Anton Hedricks in PSI Factor: Chronicles of the Paranormal.
- Sitara Hewitt (1981 – ), known for her role of Rayyan Hamoudi in Little Mosque on the Prairie.
- Chris Wiggins (1931 – 2017), known for his role as Jack Marshak in Friday the 13th: The Series.

=== Athletes ===
- Kasey Beirnes (1980 – ), professional lacrosse player for the Columbus Landsharks, Arizona Sting, Minnesota Swarm and Toronto Rock of the National Lacrosse League
- Myrtle Cook (1902 – 1985), athlete, won a gold medal in the women's 4 x 100 metres at the 1928 Summer Olympics
- Dane Dobbie (1986 – ), professional lacrosse player for the Calgary Roughnecks and San Diego Seals of the National Lacrosse League, won NLL MVP Award in 2019
- Shane MacDonald (1993 – ), professional lacrosse player for the Minnesota Swarm of the National Lacrosse League
- Eddie Powers (1888 – 1943), professional ice hockey player in the American Hockey League and professional ice hockey head coach with the Toronto St. Patricks of the National Hockey League
- David Robson (2002 – ), professional soccer goalkeeper with Hull City of the EFL Championship
- Dave Rowan (1882 – 1955), professional baseball player with the St. Louis Browns of Major League Baseball
- Cooney Woods (1899 – 1992), ice hockey goaltender who won a gold medal at the 1934 World Ice Hockey Championships with Canada

=== Doctors ===
- Charles Kirk Clarke (1857 – 1924), psychiatrist, Clarke Institute of Psychiatry named in his honour
- Abraham Groves (1847 – 1935), physician and surgeon, Groves Memorial Community Hospital in Fergus is named in his honour
- Mary Rutnam (1873 – 1962), doctor, gynecologist, suffragist, and pioneer of women's rights in Sri Lanka

=== Educators ===
- Brendan Myers (1974 – ), known for his contributions in environmental philosophy

=== Explorers ===
- John McLean (1799 – 1890), first person of European descent to discover Churchill Falls

=== Historians ===
- David Boyle (1842 – 1911), archaeologist, blacksmith, teacher, musicologist, historian, curator of the Canadian Institute Museum from 1884 – 1896
- Terry Copp (1938 – ), military historian, appointed to the Order of Canada in 2024

=== Journalists ===
- Fred Jacob (1882 – 1928), journalist with The Mail and Empire from 1910 – 1928
- Alexander Fraser Pirie (1849 – 1903), newspaper editor and publisher of The Guelph Herald from 1870 – 1903
- George Pirie (1799 – 1870), newspaper publisher of The Guelph Herald from 1848 – 1870

=== Lawyers ===
- David Fasken (1860 – 1929), acquired 226,000 acres in Texas in 1913 in what would later be called Fasken, Texas

=== Musicians ===
- John Beckwith (1927 – 2022), composer, writer, pianist, teacher, and administrator, was made a member of the Order of Canada in 1987
- Noel Edison (1958 – ), conductor of The Edison Singers, member of the Order of Ontario in 2009

=== Painters ===
- Farquhar McGillivray Knowles (1859 – 1932), best known for his paintings of seascapes

=== Politicians ===
- Absalom Shade Allan (1843 – 1928), member of the Legislative Assembly of Ontario from 1886 – 1894
- George S. Armstrong (1867 – 1947), 11th Mayor of Edmonton from 1910 – 1912
- Brenda Chamberlain (1952 – ), member of the House of Commons of Canada from 1993 – 2008
- Michael Chong (1971 – ), member of the House of Commons of Canada since 2004
- Charles Clarke (1826 – 1909), 5th Speaker of the Legislative Assembly of Ontario from 1880 – 1887
- George Alexander Drew (1826 – 1891), member of the House of Commons of Canada from 1867 – 1872 and from 1878 – 1882
- George Alexander Drew (1894 – 1973), 14th Premier of Ontario from 1957 – 1963
- Albert Ewing (1871 – 1946), member of Legislative Assembly of Alberta from 1913 – 1921 and appointed as a judge to the Supreme Court of Alberta in 1934
- Alexander David Ferrier (1813 – 1890), member of the Legislative Assembly of Ontario from 1867 – 1871
- John Grant (1841 – 1919), 20th Mayor of Victoria from 1887 – 1891
- Wilbert Hagarty (1888 – 1963), member of the Legislative Assembly of Saskatchewan from 1921 – 1929
- John McGowan (1845 – 1922), member of the Legislative Assembly of Ontario from 1874 – 1879 and member of the House of Commons of Canada from 1901 – 1904
- Udney Richardson (1869 – 1943), member of the Legislative Assembly of Ontario from 1911 – 1919
- John Duff Robertson (1873 – 1939), member of the Legislative Assembly of Saskatchewan from 1908 – 1917
- William Short (1866 – 1926), 7th Mayor of Edmonton from 1901 – 1904 and 1912 – 1913
- John Smith (1817 – 1889), member of the Legislative Assembly of Manitoba from 1879 – 1883
- Robert Watson (1853 – 1929), member of the Senate of Canada from 1900 – 1929

== See also ==
- List of unincorporated communities in Ontario

== Bibliography ==
- Carter, Floreen Ellen, Place Names of Ontario, London, Ontario, Phelps Publishing, 1984, ISBN 9780920298398
