= Olaf Turnbull =

Canadian farmer, educator, and politician

Olaf Alexander Turnbull (December 30, 1917 – March 15, 2004) was a farmer, educator and political figure in Saskatchewan. He represented Elrose from 1960 to 1964 in the Legislative Assembly of Saskatchewan as a Co-operative Commonwealth Federation (CCF) member.

He was born near Kindersley, Saskatchewan, the son of Harry Gordon Turnbull and Ingaborg Swanson, and was educated locally, going on to earn a BSc in Agricultural Economics from the University of Saskatchewan. Turnbull served on the council for the rural municipality of Kindersley and was also a director and vice-president for the Saskatchewan Farmers' Union. In 1945, he married Alice Turner. Turnbull was a candidate for the leadership of the Saskatchewan CCF in 1961. He was a member of the provincial cabinet, serving as Minister of Co-operation and Co-operative Development and as Minister of Education. Turnbull was defeated by George Leith when he ran for reelection to the Saskatchewan assembly in 1964. After retiring from politics, he briefly returned to farming and then was hired by the Western Co-operative College of Canada in Saskatoon. Turnbull was executive director for the college from 1972 to 1982. After retiring from the college, he worked overseas with the Canadian International Development Agency. Turnbull died in Saskatoon at the age of 86.
