= 2014 National Lacrosse League entry draft =

- 2014 NLL Draft
Date	September 22, 2014
- Time
Location	Toronto Rock Athletic Centre
Network	YouTube
First Pick	Ben McIntosh; Edmonton Rush
Overall Picks	55

The 2014 National Lacrosse League Entry Draft was the 27th annual meeting of the National Lacrosse League (NLL) franchises to select newly eligible box lacrosse players to the leagues rosters. It was hosted by the Toronto Rock at the Toronto Rock Athletic Centre on September 22, 2014. A total off 55 players were selected in the draft with the Edmonton Rush selecting first overall for the first time in three years. The draft was also televised online on YouTube.

== Overview ==
The following is the breakdown of the 55 players selected by Box Lacrosse positions:

- 25 forwards
- 10 transition
- 17 defenders
- 3 goaltenders

== Determination of draft order ==
The draft order is based generally on each team's record from the previous season, with teams which qualified for the postseason selecting after those which failed to make the playoffs.

== Draft ==
=== Round 1 ===
Overall	Team	Player	Positions	College
1	Edmonton Rush	Ben McIntosh	Forward	Drexel
2	Rochester Knighthawks	Jeremy Noble	Forward	Denver
3	Minnesota Swarm	Miles Thompson	Forward	Albany
4	Colorado Mammoth	Eli McLaughlin	Forward	Coquitlam Adanacs
5	Minnesota Swarm	Shane MacDonald	Transition	Brampton Excelsiors
6	New England Black Wolves	Mark Cockerton	Forward	Virginia
7	Colorado Mammoth	Robert Hope	Defense	Pfeiffer
8	New England Black Wolves	Quin Powless	Forward	Six Nations Chiefs
9	Buffalo Bandits	Brandon Goodwin	Forward	Adelphi

=== Round 2 ===
Overall	Team	Player	Positions	College
10	Minnesota Swarm	Joe Maracle	Forward	Six Nations Chiefs
11	New England Black Wolves	Rodd Squire	Defense	Six Nations Chiefs
12	Vancouver Stealth	Conrad Chapman	Transition	Nanaimo Timbermen
13	Edmonton Rush	Adam Shute	Goalkeeper	New England
14	Buffalo Bandits	Matthew Bennett	Transition	Brampton Excelsiors
15	New England Black Wolves	Matt Crough	Forward	Dowling
16	Calgary Roughnecks	Tyson Roe	Transition	Concordia
17	Colorado Mammoth	Alex Buque	Goalie	American International
18	Buffalo Bandits	Tyler Ferreira	Forward	Dowling
19	Edmonton Rush ^	Tyler Melnyk	Forward	Marquette

=== Round 3 ===
Overall	Team	Player	Positions	College
20	New England Black Wolves	Josh Johnson	Forward	Six Nations Chiefs
21	Vancouver Stealth	Brandon Clelland	Defense	Orangeville Northmen
22	New England Black Wolves	Sheldon Burns	Defense	Dowling
23	Vancouver Stealth	Dan Keane	Forward	Delaware
24	Buffalo Bandits	Jordan Dance	Forward	Orangeville Northmen
25	Vancouver Stealth	Jakob Doucet	Transitions	New Westminster Salmonbellies
26	New England Black Wolves	Ty Thompson	Forward	Albany
27	Rochester Knighthawks	Brier Jonathan	Transition	Six Nations Chiefs
28	New England Blackwolves	Connor Campbell	Defense	Brampton Excelsiors

=== Round 4 ===
Overall	Team	Player	Positions	College
29	Minnesota Swarm	Eric Guiltinan	Defense	Brampton Excelsiors
30	Vancouver Stealth	Matt Delmonico	Forward	Seton Hill
31	New England Black Wolves	Mike Mawdsley	Transition	Sacred Heart
32	Colorado Mammoth	Zach Rogers	Defense	Providence
33	Toronto Rock	Brandon Benn	Forward	Johns Hopkins
34	New England Black Wolves	Jayson Crawford	Defense	Halton Hills
35	Edmonton Rush	Matt MacGrotty	Defense	Bryant
36	Calgary Roughnecks	Pat Henry	Forward	Calgary Mountaineers
37	Rochester Knighthawks	Ian Martin	Forward	Six Nations Chiefs

=== Round 5 ===
Overall	Team	Player	Positions	College
38	Minnesota Swarm	Pat Miles	Defense	New England
39	Vancouver Stealth	DJ Saari	Defense	Coquitlam Adanacs
40	Minnesota Swarm	Paxton Leroux	Defense	Peterborough Lakers
41	Colorado Mammoth	DJ Giacobbo	Defense	Canisius
42	Colorado Mammoth	Terry Ellis	Transition	Denver
43	Toronto Rock	Jordan Robertson	Transition	Whitby Warriors
44	Edmonton Rush	Chad Mitchell	Forward	Bellarmine
45	Calgary Roughnecks	Cam Gardner	Forward	Bellarmine
46	Rochester Knighthawks	Anthony Patterson	Defense	Six Nations Chiefs

=== Round 6 ===
Overall	Team	Player	Positions	College
47	Edmonton Rush	Mitch McAvoy	Transition	Mercyhurst
48	Vancouver Stealth	Steve Ferdinandi	Defense	New Westminster Salmonbellies
49	Buffalo Bandits	Mike Melnychenko	Forward	Chestnut Hill
50	Colorado Mammoth	Mike Crampton	Forward	US Air Force Academy
51	Toronto Rock	Brady Heseltine	Forward	Mercyhurst
52	Toronto Rock	Darryl Robertson	Forward	Whitby Warriors
53	Edmonton Rush	Mike De Girolamo	Goalkeeper	Edmonton Outlaws
54	Calgary Roughnecks	Andrew Smistad	Defense	Marquette
55	Rochester Knighthawks	Zach Williams	Transition	Six Nations Rebels

^ Compensatory Pick
