= John Smith (Manitoba politician) =

English-born farmer and political figure in Manitoba

John Smith (January 28, 1817 – October 18, 1889) was an English-born farmer and political figure in Manitoba. He represented Burnside from 1879 to 1883 in the Legislative Assembly of Manitoba as an independent member.

He was born in Brigg, Lincolnshire and came to Canada in 1837, settling in Martintown, Ontario. Smith married Margaret Grant in 1847. They subsequently moved to Elora, where he was president and manager of the Nicol Mutual Fire Insurance Companies and also served on the rural council for Pilkington township. Smith came to Manitoba in 1872 and settled near Oakland, followed by his family in 1873. After the death of his first wife, Smith married a Mrs. McKinnon in 1883. Smith was defeated by Isaiah Mawhinney when he ran for reelection to the Manitoba assembly in 1883.

He died of typhoid fever in Winnipeg at the age of 72 and was buried in Portage la Prairie.
