= Wilbert Hagarty =

Canadian politician

Wilbert Hagarty (January 9, 1888 – August 11, 1963) was a farmer and political figure in Saskatchewan. He represented Elrose in the Legislative Assembly of Saskatchewan from 1921 to 1929 as a Liberal.

He was born in Elora, Ontario, the son of Michael Hagarty and Mary Grey, and was educated there. Hagarty lived in Lucky Lake, Saskatchewan.
