= Elora Gorge =

Valley in Ontario, Canada

Elora Gorge Conservation Area
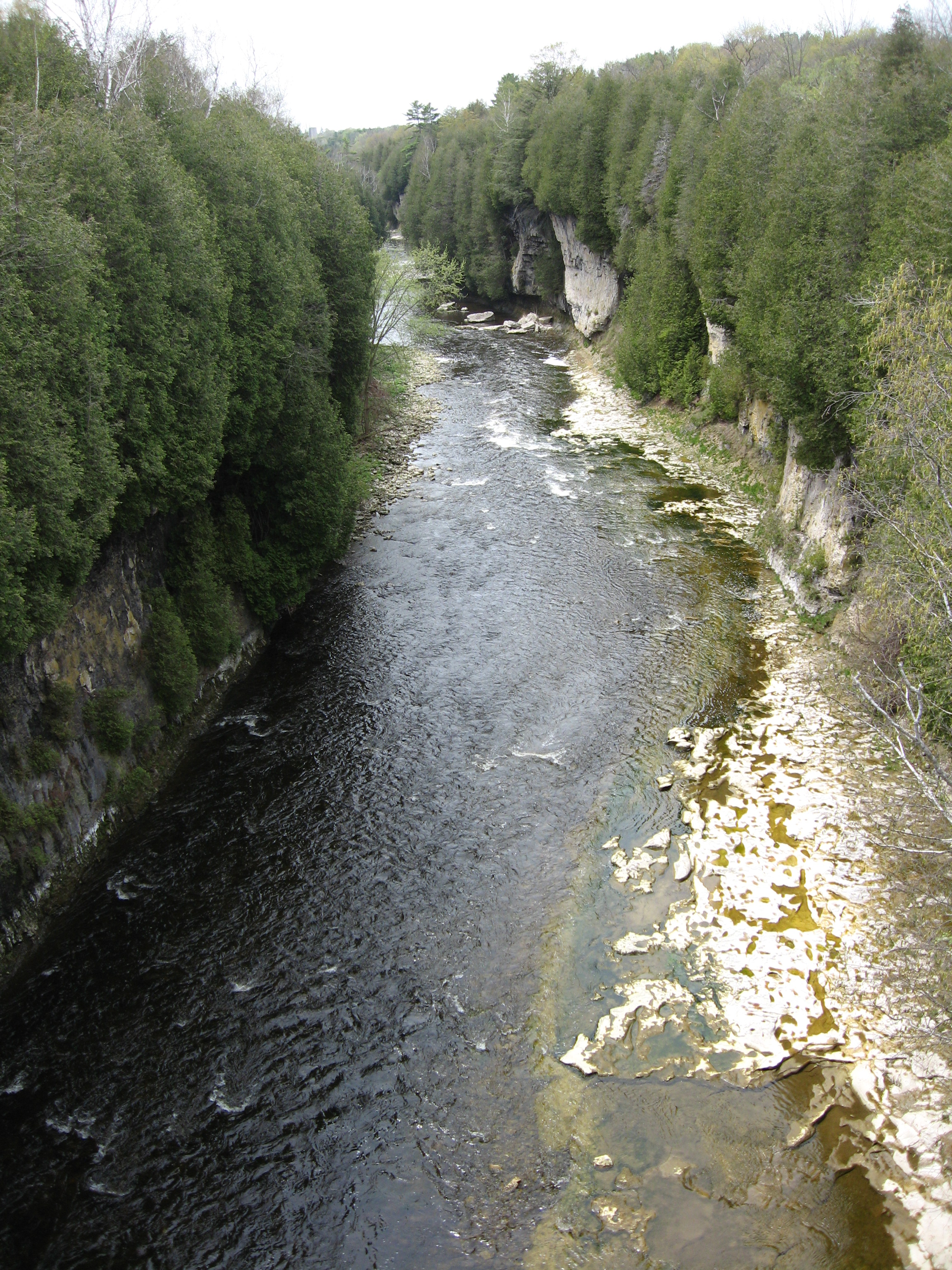
- The Grand River flowing through the Elora Gorge
- Interactive map of Elora Gorge Conservation Area
- Nearest city: Guelph
- Coordinates: 43°40′0″N 80°27′0″W
- Area: 145 hectares (360 acres)
- Established: 2006
- Governing body: Grand River Conservation Authority

The Elora Gorge is a popular tourist attraction located at the western edge of Elora, Ontario, Canada, which is 25 km north from the city of Guelph.

Elora Gorge Conservation Area is one of many conservation areas owned by the Grand River Conservation Authority.

== About ==
The Grand River flows through the bottom of the gorge, approximately 2 kilometres (1.2 mi) long, with limestone cliffs reaching 22 metres (72 ft) high. It was formed from glacial meltwaters from the previous ice age. The area includes a park with camping sites, hiking trails, and is also popular for kayaking and tubing.

Located nearby is the "old swimming hole", at the Elora Quarry Conservation Area, a 0.8 hectare (two acre) former limestone quarry encircled by sheer cliffs up to 12 metres (39 ft) high. Elora Quarry did not become a conservation area until 1976, but it was a popular swimming area long before that.

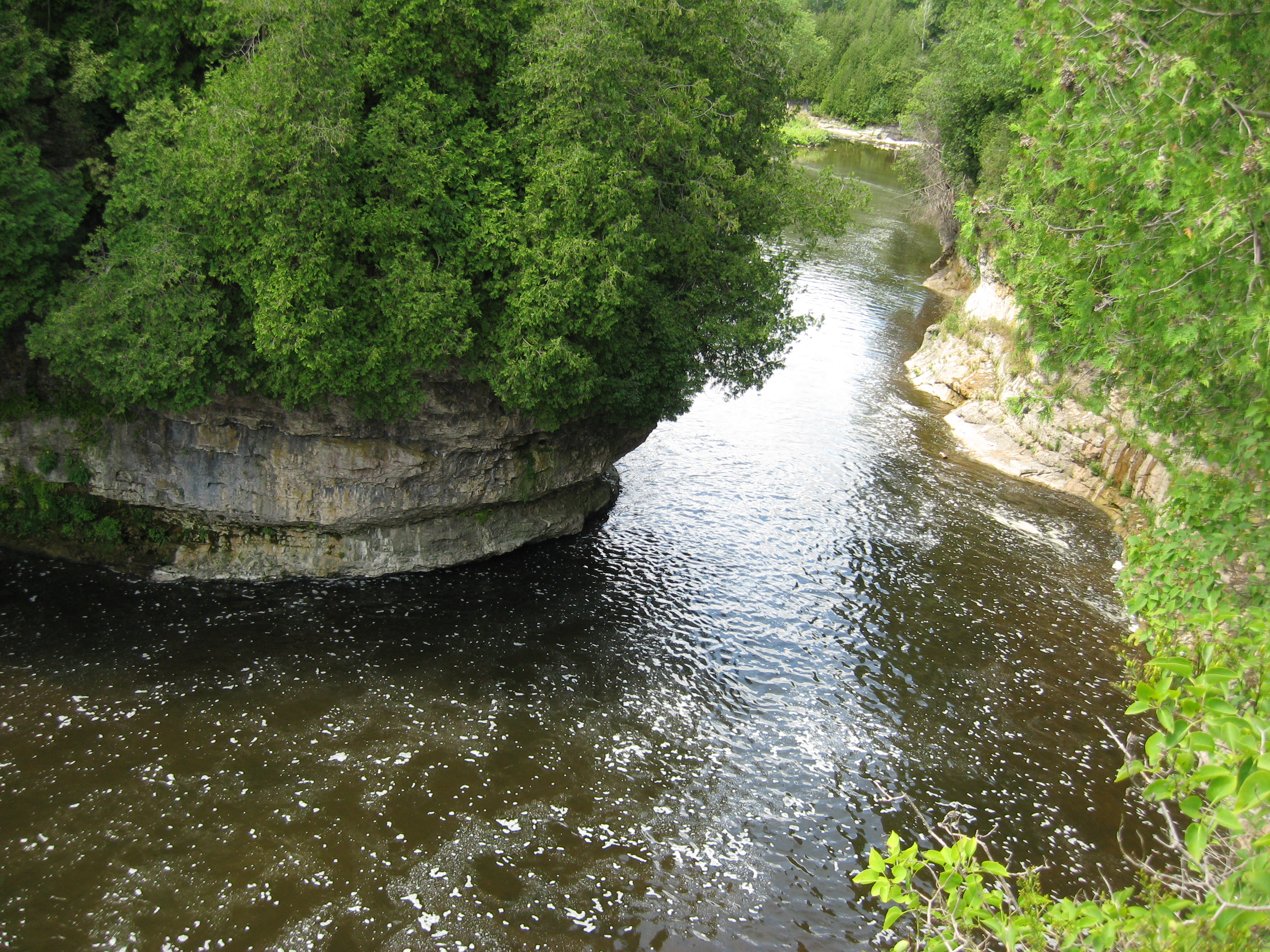
Elora gorge

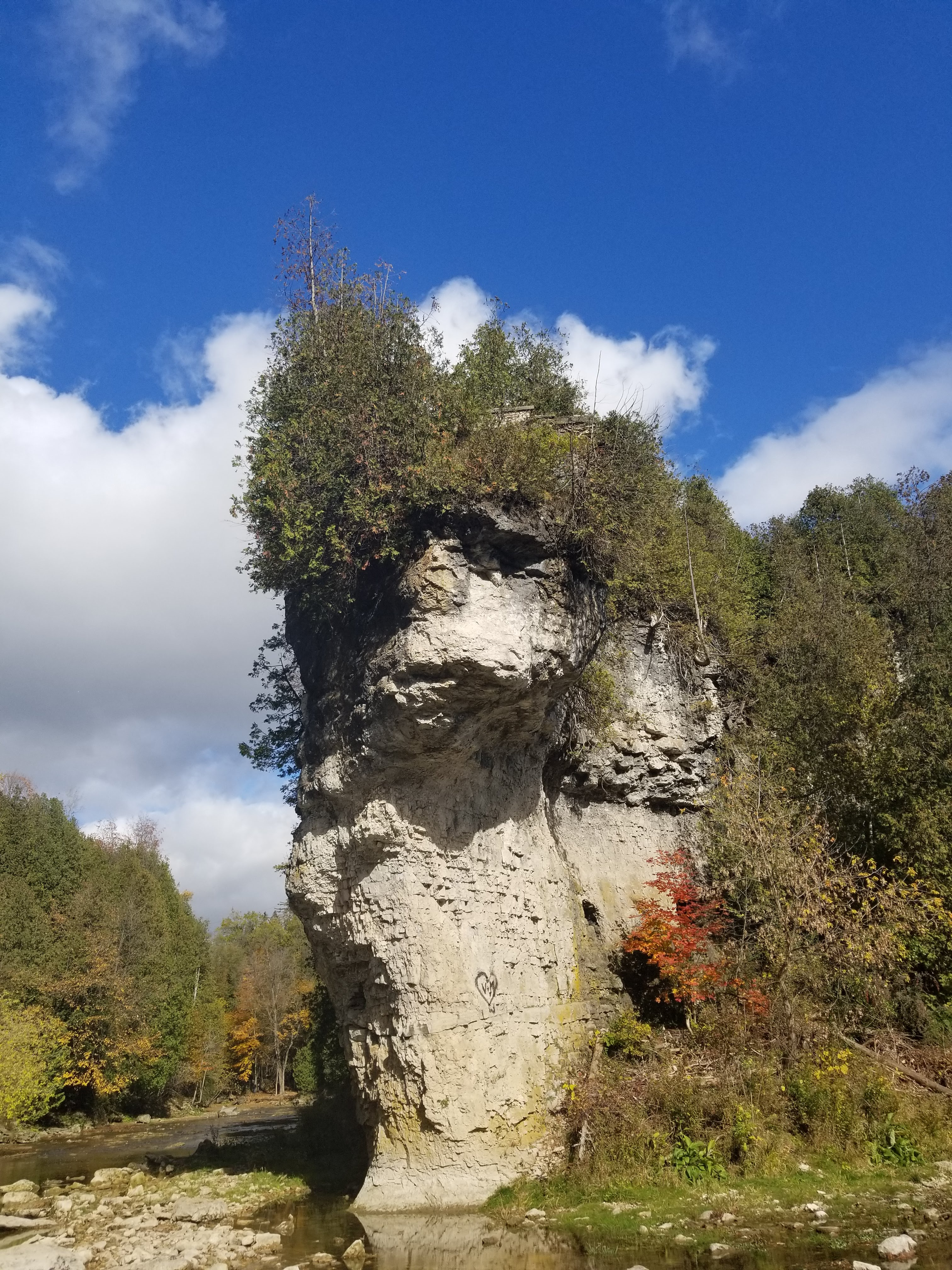
Elora Gorge Cliff Face

The Elora Gorge Falls are a roughly 25 ft (7.6 m) tall waterfall located upstream from the Elora Gorge.

Popular activities at the site include: camping, canoeing, fishing, hiking, cycling, swimming, picnicking, and tubing.

The Quarry served as a film location in the 2017 adaptation of Stephen King’s novel It, as well as its 2019 sequel.
