= Maurice John Willis =

Canadian politician and educator

Maurice John Willis (May 1900 – November 10, 1975) was an educator and political figure in Saskatchewan. He represented Elrose from 1944 to 1960 in the Legislative Assembly of Saskatchewan as a Co-operative Commonwealth Federation (CCF) member.

He was born in Stony Mountain, Manitoba and educated at the University of Manitoba. Willis was principal of the Elrose School for six years and then of the Eston High School for 29 years. He was president of the local Teachers' Association and served as councillor to the Saskatchewan Teachers' Federation from 1939 to 1942.
