= Drew Petkoff =

Canadian lacrosse player (born 1985)

Personal information
- Born: March 17, 1985 (age 40)
- Height: 6 ft 2 in (188 cm)
- Weight: 205 lb (93 kg; 14 st 9 lb)

Sport
- Position: Transition
- Shoots: Left
- NLL teams: Georgia Swarm; New England Black Wolves; Buffalo Bandits; Toronto Rock
- MSL team Former teams: Kitchener-Waterloo Kodiaks; Brampton Excelsiors
- Pro career: 2010–

Drew Petkoff (born March 17, 1985) is a professional lacrosse player under contract with the Buffalo Bandits of the National Lacrosse League. Hailing from Hamilton, Ontario, Petkoff began his junior career in 2002 with the Milton Mavericks of the Ontario Junior B Lacrosse League, and was acquired by the Oakville Buzz in 2005, winning the Founders Cup with the Buzz in 2006. He also spent time with the Senior B Ajax-Pickering Rock in 2008 and 2009. Petkoff began his Major Series Lacrosse career in 2009 and won two Mann Cups with the Brampton Excelsiors before being dealt to the Kitchener-Waterloo Kodiaks in 2011. He last played for the Kodiaks in 2013.

Petkoff began his NLL career in 2010 with the Toronto Rock. He played 25 games with the Rock between 2010 and 2012, winning the Champion's Cup in 2011. Petkoff then joined the Bandits, and sat out most of 2013 and all of 2014 nursing a concussion. He spent time in 2014 on the Bandits' holdout list.

Petkoff joined the New England Black Wolves in March 2015. In November 2015, Petkoff was acquired by the Georgia Swarm in a trade for Shane MacDonald.

Petkoff is a veteran of a number of junior hockey leagues and played college hockey at the University of Windsor.
