= Grand River Raceway =

Entertainment and racing complex in Elora, Ontario

Coordinates: 43°40′23.06″N 80°25′49.80″W

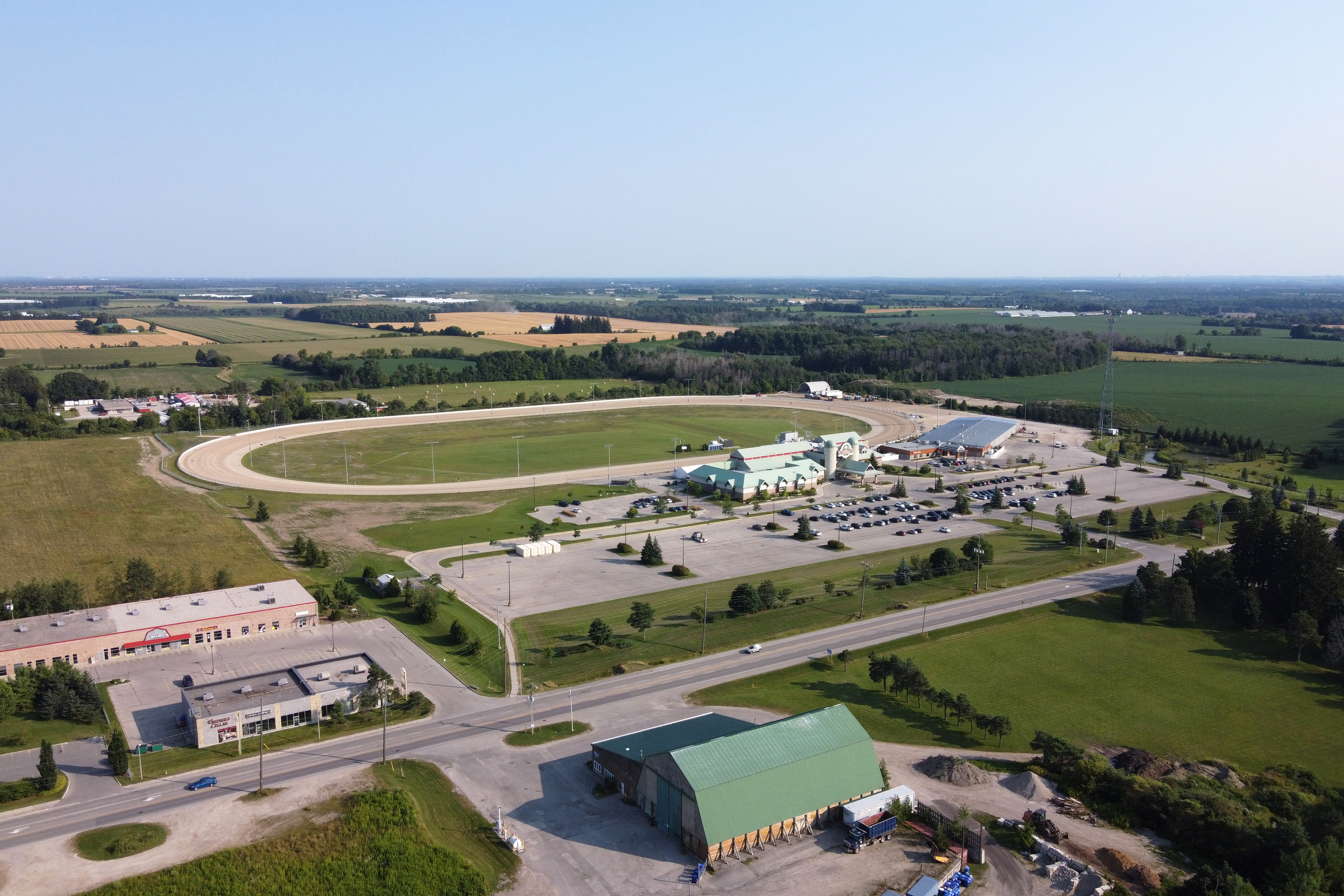
- Interactive map of Grand River Raceway
- Location: 7445 Wellington County Road 21, Elora, Ontario, Canada; N0B 1S0
- Owned by: Grand River Agricultural Society
- Date opened: December 6, 2003
- Course type: Flat harness
- Notable races: Battle Of Waterloo; Battle Of The Belles

Grand River Raceway is an entertainment, racing, and gaming destination located in Elora, Ontario, Canada. It opened in 2002 with 200 slot machines operated by Ontario Lottery and Gaming. That subsequently increased to 230+ machines. The casino, known as Elements Casino, operates 24 hours a day, seven days a week. The Raceway offers seasonal live harness racing (summer), year-round simulcast of racing from across North America, dining and special events.

The property and facilities are owned and operated by the Grand River Agricultural Society (G.R.A.S.) a not-for-profit corporation, incorporated under the Agricultural Societies Act of Ontario and operated by a volunteer board of directors. Best known as a racing, gaming & dining entertainment destination, Grand River Raceway also offers Meetings & Events Services, with rentals of the many rooms and spaces for business events, conferences, parties, complemented by in-house catering. The Society leases space to the OLG for the slot machines; the OLG is the operator and employer for the slots operation.

In 2009, the Raceway paid Centre Wellington $1.6 million in taxes and the OLG paid the Township an additional $1.78 million, from a share of the profits.

A plan for substantial expansion was approved by Township Council in February 2017; this is expected to add gaming tables (up to 52) and many slot machines (up to 1200 in total). Some councilors were strongly opposed to the plan. The rationale for the majority decision was the revenue benefit; since the casino opened, the Township has received over $22 million from the Raceway and the OLG's currently small slot machine operation.
