= Elrose (electoral district) =

Former provincial electoral district in Saskatchewan, Canada

Coordinates: 51°00′N 107°40′W

Elrose was a provincial electoral district for the Legislative Assembly of the province of Saskatchewan, Canada. Located in southwestern Saskatchewan, this constituency was centred on the town of Elrose. The riding was created before the 3rd Saskatchewan general election in 1912 as "Eagle Creek"; it was renamed "Elrose" in 1917.

The district was dissolved and combined with the Rosetown riding (as Rosetown-Elrose) before the 18th Saskatchewan general election in 1975. It is now part of a revived Rosetown-Elrose constituency.

== Members of the Legislative Assembly ==
#	MLA	Served	Party
1.	George Hamilton Harris	1912–1917	Liberal
2.	Archibald Peter McNab	1917–1921	Liberal
3.	Wilbert Hagarty	1921–1929	Liberal
4.	James Cobban	1929–1934	Conservative
5.	John Andrew Wilson	1934–1938	Liberal
6.	Louis Henry Hantelman	1938–1944	CCF
7.	Maurice Willis	1944–1960	CCF
8.	Olaf Turnbull	1960–1964	CCF
9.	George G. Leith	1964–1971	Liberal
10.	Hayden Owens	1971–1975	New Democrat

== Election results ==
1912 Saskatchewan general election: Eagle Creek electoral district
Party	Candidate	Votes	%	±%
Liberal	George Hamilton Harris	808	56.62%	–
Conservative	J.C. Laycock	619	43.38%	–
Total		1,427	100.00%	

1917 Saskatchewan general election: Elrose electoral district
Party	Candidate	Votes	%	±%
Liberal	Archibald Peter McNab	1,258	40.74%	-15.88
Conservative	Francis Henderson Forgie	963	31.18%	-12.20
Independent	Edward Richard Powell	867	28.08%	–
Total		3,088	100.00%	

1921 Saskatchewan general election: Elrose electoral district
Party	Candidate	Votes	%	±%
Liberal	Wilbert Hagarty	1,957	52.49%	+11.75
Independent	Homer Anthony Metcalf	1,701	45.63%	-
Independent	Adolph M. Wick	70	1.88%	-
Total		3,728	100.00%	

1925 Saskatchewan general election: Elrose electoral district
Party	Candidate	Votes	%	±%
Liberal	Wilbert Hagarty	1,717	52.57%	+0.08
Progressive	Francis Henderson Forgie	1,549	47.43%	–
Total		3,266	100.00%	

1929 Saskatchewan general election: Elrose electoral district
Party	Candidate	Votes	%	±%
Conservative	James Cobban	3,136	60.06%	-
Liberal	Luther Ellis Jones	2,085	39.94%	-12.63
Total		5,221	100.00%	

1934 Saskatchewan general election: Elrose electoral district
Party	Candidate	Votes	%	±%
Liberal	John Andrew Wilson	2,213	40.91%	+0.97
Farmer-Labour	Halvor Vindeg	1,807	33.40%	-
Conservative	Donald Byron Grant	1,390	25.69%	-34.37
Total		5,410	100.00%	

1938 Saskatchewan general election: Elrose electoral district
Party	Candidate	Votes	%	±%
CCF	Louis Henry Hantelman	3,164	43.86%	+10.46
Liberal	George B. Weiler	2,676	37.10%	-3.81
Social Credit	Gilbert A. W. Gessel	1,014	14.05%	–
Conservative	Henry T. Blackwell	360	4.99%	-20.70
Total		7,214	100.00%	

1944 Saskatchewan general election: Elrose electoral district
Party	Candidate	Votes	%	±%
CCF	Maurice Willis	3,771	57.21%	+13.35
Liberal	Hubert Staines	1,807	27.42%	-9.68
Prog. Conservative	Ernest J. Ewing	1,013	15.37%	+10.38
Total		6,591	100.00%	

1948 Saskatchewan general election: Elrose electoral district
Party	Candidate	Votes	%	±%
CCF	Maurice Willis	4,153	55.73%	-1.54
Independent Liberal	Harry N. McKenzie	3,299	44.27%	–
Total		7,452	100.00%	

1952 Saskatchewan general election: Elrose electoral district
Party	Candidate	Votes	%	±%
CCF	Maurice Willis	4,148	63.58%	+7.85
Liberal	James W. Johnson	2,376	36.42%	-
Total		6,524	100.00%	

1956 Saskatchewan general election: Elrose electoral district
Party	Candidate	Votes	%	±%
CCF	Maurice Willis	3,840	55.50%	-8.08
Liberal	Robert Hay	1,925	27.82%	-8.60
Social Credit	Edward R. Powell	1,154	16.68%	-
Total		6,919	100.00%	

1960 Saskatchewan general election: Elrose electoral district
Party	Candidate	Votes	%	±%
CCF	Olaf Turnbull	3,386	46.28%	-9.22
Liberal	George G. Leith	1,823	24.92%	-2.90
Prog. Conservative	Thomas Myers	1,722	23.54%	-
Social Credit	Olive G. Oliphant	385	5.26%	-11.42
Total		7,316	100.00%	

1964 Saskatchewan general election: Elrose electoral district
Party	Candidate	Votes	%	±%
Liberal	George G. Leith	3,317	50.41%	+25.49
CCF	Olaf Turnbull	3,263	49.59%	+3.31
Total		6,580	100.00%	

1967 Saskatchewan general election: Elrose electoral district
Party	Candidate	Votes	%	±%
Liberal	George G. Leith	3,081	51.03%	+0.62
NDP	David Loewen	2,957	48.97%	-0.62
Total		6,038	100.00%	

1971 Saskatchewan general election: Elrose electoral district
Party	Candidate	Votes	%	±%
NDP	Hayden Owens	3,147	52.16%	+3.19
Liberal	George G. Leith	2,886	47.84%	-3.19
Total		6,033	100.00%	

== See also ==
- List of Saskatchewan provincial electoral districts
- List of Saskatchewan general elections
- Canadian provincial electoral districts
