= David Fasken =

- Born: David Milne Fasken; December 31, 1860; Wellington County, Canada West
- Died: December 2, 1929 (aged 68)
- Occupation: Lawyer
- Parent(s): Robert Fasken; Isabel Milne

David Milne Fasken (December 31, 1860 – December 2, 1929) was a Canadian lawyer from Wellington County, Canada West, whose wealth, later inherited by his family, formed Fasken Oil & Ranch in 1979, an oil company which currently owns approximately 300,000 acres of land in Texas. In 2015, the family was estimated to have a net worth of $3 billion.

== Life ==
David Fasken was born in 1860 the son of Robert Fasken and Isabel Milne. The Fasken family emigrated from Scotland in 1837 to Elora, then in Upper Canada, but by the time he was born in Canada West. David was the 5th of ten children and went to school in Elora. He graduated from the University of Toronto in 1882 and pursued law. He later worked at the law firm of William Henry Beatty who mentored him.

In 1913, Fasken acquired 226,000 acres for $1.50 an acre in what would later be called Fasken, near Midland, Texas, intending to convert it to a farm. He retired there and ended his law practice in 1919.

=== Death ===
Fasken died on December 2, 1929 at the age of 68 leaving behind an estate worth $1,792,300, excluding unknown oil reserves on the land. The Supreme Court of Canada, while interpreting his will, commented that his inheritance was "very substantial". The Toronto Daily Star ran the headline "David Fasken, Wealthy Mining Magnate Dies".

Oil was discovered on the property leading to the creation of the Fasken Oil & Ranch company in 1979.
