= Fred Jacob =

Canadian journalist

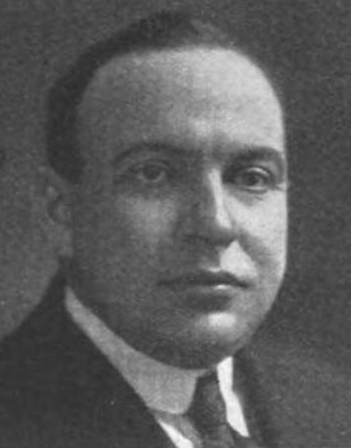
- Born: 31 October 1882; Elora, Ontario
- Died: 3 June 1928 (aged 45); Toronto, Ontario
- Occupation: Journalist
- Employer: The Mail and Empire

Fred Jacob (occasionally shown as Fred Jacobs in some publications about his work; 31 October 1882 – 3 June 1928) was a journalist with Toronto's The Mail and Empire (now The Globe and Mail), and joined the publication after winning the publication's poetry contest.

He was first a sports reporter but from 1910 on, Jacob was responsible for the literary section of the newspaper; he was also the drama and music critic. Occasionally, he wrote about drama in the Canadian Magazine.

== Early years ==
Jacob was born in Elora, Ontario on 31 October 1882, the son of a lawyer and the nephew of a judge. As a child, he particularly enjoyed lacrosse. Later in life, while living in Toronto, he was the president of a lacrosse club for 16 years.

== Fictional works ==
Jacob wrote two novels, The Day Before Yesterday (published in 1925) and Peevee (1928), both satirical works, and set in a fictional small communities resembling Elora; the first book included some characters resembling residents of the town.

He wrote that his intention in the books was to "preserve an impression of the Canadian scene". A review of the first book provided this comment: "To the structure of Canadian literature Mr. Fred Jacob has contributed not only a substantial brick but a graceful vine."

Jacob also wrote several popular stage plays, including One third of a bill and Autumn Blooming.

== Legacy ==
Jacob suffered from rheumatic fever as a child, and died on 3 June 1928 of a heart attack during a social function. An obituary in Saturday Night referred to him as the "ablest critic on drama of the daily press in Toronto", praising "the soundness of his judgements and clearness of his expositions".
