= Shane MacDonald =

Canadian lacrosse player

Personal information
- Born: May 26, 1993 (age 32) Elora, Ontario, Canada
- Height: 6 ft 0 in (183 cm)
- Weight: 205 lb (93 kg; 14 st 9 lb)

Sport
- Position: Forward/Transition
- Shoots: Left
- NLL draft: 5th overall, 2014; Minnesota Swarm
- NLL team: Minnesota Swarm
- WLA team: New Westminster Salmonbellies
- Pro career: 2015–

Shane MacDonald (born May 26, 1993 in Elora, Ontario, Canada) is a Canadian lacrosse player for the Minnesota Swarm in the National Lacrosse League.

== Junior career ==
Before entering the 2014 National Lacrosse League Entry Draft, Shane MacDonald was a forward for the Brampton Excelsiors in Major Series Lacrosse, the Orangeville Northmen Jr. A of the OLA Junior A Lacrosse League, and the Elora Mohawks of the OLA Junior B Lacrosse League.

== Professional career ==
Shane MacDonald was selected fifth overall in the 2014 National Lacrosse League Entry Draft by the Minnesota Swarm, who had received the pick in a trade with the Buffalo Bandits. In his rookie season in the National Lacrosse League, MacDonald had a rather low scoring season with only 6 goals, 7 assist and 13 points.

== NLL Statistics ==
		Regular Season						Playoffs
Season	Team	GP	G	A	Pts	LB	PIM	GP	G	A	Pts	LB	PIM
2015	Minnesota	11	6	7	13	16	5	--	--	--	--	--	--
	NLL totals	11	6	7	13	16	5	--	--	--	--	--	--
