= George Gordon Leith =

Canadian politician (1923–1996)

George Gordon Leith (June 18, 1923 – May 31, 1996) was a farmer and political figure in Saskatchewan. He represented Elrose from 1964 to 1971 in the Legislative Assembly of Saskatchewan as a Liberal.

He was born in Saskatoon, Saskatchewan, the son of John Alexander Leith and Florence Turner, and grew up on the family farm near Glamis. Leith studied at the University of Saskatchewan. He served in the Canadian Army and then the Royal Canadian Air Force during World War II. In 1945, he married Beryl Kathleen Philion.

Leith was an unsuccessful candidate for a seat in the provincial assembly in 1960; he was elected in 1964 and again in 1967 but was defeated by Hayden Owens when he ran for reelection in 1971. He ran for the leadership of the provincial Liberal party in 1971. Leith later served as special assistant to the Canadian Minister of Agriculture Eugene Whelan. In 1976, he was named to the Canadian Grain Commission; he was chief commissioner from 1986 to 1989 and, in 1990, became chairman for the National Committee on Grain Transportation. Leith died in Winnipeg at the age of 72.
