= Fasken, Texas =

Coordinates: 32.5812°N 102.5452°W

Fasken is a ghost town in east central Andrews County, Texas, United States. It rose and declined within the first half of the 20th century.

== History ==
Founded in 1917 by the Midland Farms Company, it was originally part of a speculation enterprise. David Fasken, a lawyer and businessman from Toronto, Canada had purchased the 227,000-acre (920 km^{2}) "C" Ranch in the hope of dividing this large cattle ranch into farm properties. To make the farms more attractive he had the Midland and Northwestern Railway built out to the properties and the town founded on the rail line. It was hoped that a large number of settlers would move there. Soon Fasken had a depot, a store, hotel, barbershop, school and a zoo. Many of the town's lots did sell but few of the purchasers ever took up residence in Fasken. Heavy rains destroyed much of the railroad track in 1923 and the rail line had to be abandoned. Fasken declined rapidly and became a ghost town by the early 1930s.
