= Hayden William Owens =

Canadian politician (1908–1981)

Hayden William Owens (June 21, 1908 – October 16, 1981) was a businessman and political figure in Saskatchewan. He represented Elrose from 1971 to 1975 in the Legislative Assembly of Saskatchewan as a New Democratic Party (NDP) member.

He was born in Swift Current, Saskatchewan, grew up on the family farm and was educated in Eston and at the University of Saskatchewan. After farming for several years, Owens worked as foreman for the rural municipality of Snipe Lake and then was an automobile and farm implement dealer in Eston. He was chairman of the board for the Eston-Elrose School Unit and was a founding board member for the Eston Credit Union. Owens was defeated by Roy Bailey when he ran for reelection in the newly formed Rosetown-Elrose riding.
