= Cotswold, Ontario =

Cotswold
- Unincorporated community
- Interactive map of Cotswold
- Coordinates: 43°52′10″N 80°47′26″W
- Country: Canada
- Province: Ontario
- County: Wellington County
- Town: Minto
- Time zone: UTC-5 (EST)
  - Summer (DST): UTC-4 (EDT)
- Forward sortation area: N
- Area codes: 519 and 226
- NTS Map: 040P15
- GNBC Code: FATJV

Cotswold is a small community located in the Town of Minto, in the northern part of Wellington County in southern Ontario, Canada. Cotswold was originally a separate community, but was amalgamated with other communities to create the Town of Minto.

== History ==
The name Cotswold is English, associated with a range of hills in the central South West of England renowned for farming. The name does not reflect the backgrounds of the early settlers in the district, most of whom where Scottish and Irish; legend says that a settler imported sheep from Cotswold hills and borrowed the name for the post office. The early settlement did have several stores, including a blacksmith shop, cobbler, cheese Factory, gristmill, log schoolhouse, and sawmill, one of which also functioned as the post office.

The Cotswold Cheese factory (Minto and Arthur Cheese and Butter Manufacturing Company Limited) opened in 1881 and was successful in its 30 years of business, but was still only a marginal operation. Records show a change in ownership of various businesses (possibly due to low profits). The community declined as the roads to Palmerston and Harriston improved. The post office was the last holdout; it closed in 1914. After 50 years of settlement, most of Cotswold's pioneers were gone.

== List of some Cotswold settlers and pioneers ==
- Wellington Adams
- George Calder
- John Campbell
- Richard Conquest
- John Darroch
- John Greenwood
- Charles, Thomas, and William Hughes
- Elizabeth and Micheal Lawless
- Peter Mckenzie
- John Prain
- George Reid
- James Robertson
- Wellington Wilson

== Today ==
The last remaining building was the Cotswold United Church, which was torn down circa 2010. The community has been amalgamated with: Clifford, Cotswold, Drew, Fultons, Glenlee, Harriston, and Palmerston to form the Town of Minto.
