= James McMullen =

Canadian politician

The Honourable James McMullen
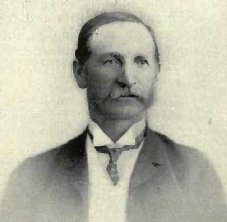

Member of Parliament for Wellington North
- In office 1882–1900
- Preceded by: George Alexander Drew
- Succeeded by: Edwin Tolton

Canadian Senator from Ontario
- In office February 11, 1902 – March 18, 1913
- Appointed by: Wilfrid Laurier

Personal details
- Born: November 29, 1833 County Monaghan, Ireland
- Died: March 18, 1913 (aged 79)
- Party: Liberal

James McMullen (November 29, 1833 – March 18, 1913) was a Canadian politician.

== Background ==
Born in County Monaghan, Ireland, the second son of Archibald McMullen and Mary Moorehead, he emigrated to Canada West with his family in 1846 setting near Fergus, Ontario. Educated at the Common School, McMullen was a merchant in Mount Forest, Ontario.

He was a director and vice-president of the Georgian Bay and Wellington Railway, a director of the Grand Trunk, Georgian Bay and Lake Erie Railway, and a director of the Dominion Life Insurance Company. He was a city councillor and reeve before being elected to the House of Commons of Canada for the riding of Wellington North in an 1880 by-election. A Liberal, he was re-elected in the 1887, 1891, 1896 elections. He was defeated in the 1900 election.

McMullen was summoned to the Senate of Canada on the advice of Prime Minister Wilfrid Laurier in 1902 representing the senatorial division of North Wellington. He served until his death in 1913.

McMullen was married to Mary Ann Dunbar in 1858. His descendants include the mathematician Curtis McMullen.
