= Drew, Ontario =

Community in Ontario, Canada

Coordinates: 43.9833°N 80.8833°W

Drew is a rural farming community in Wellington County, Ontario, Canada, forming part of the Town of Minto. From the division of Minto into 18 concessions, Drew emerged from Concessions 16 and 17, spanning approximately five miles. Drew's main attractions include the Drew Ball Diamond and the Drew Community Centre.

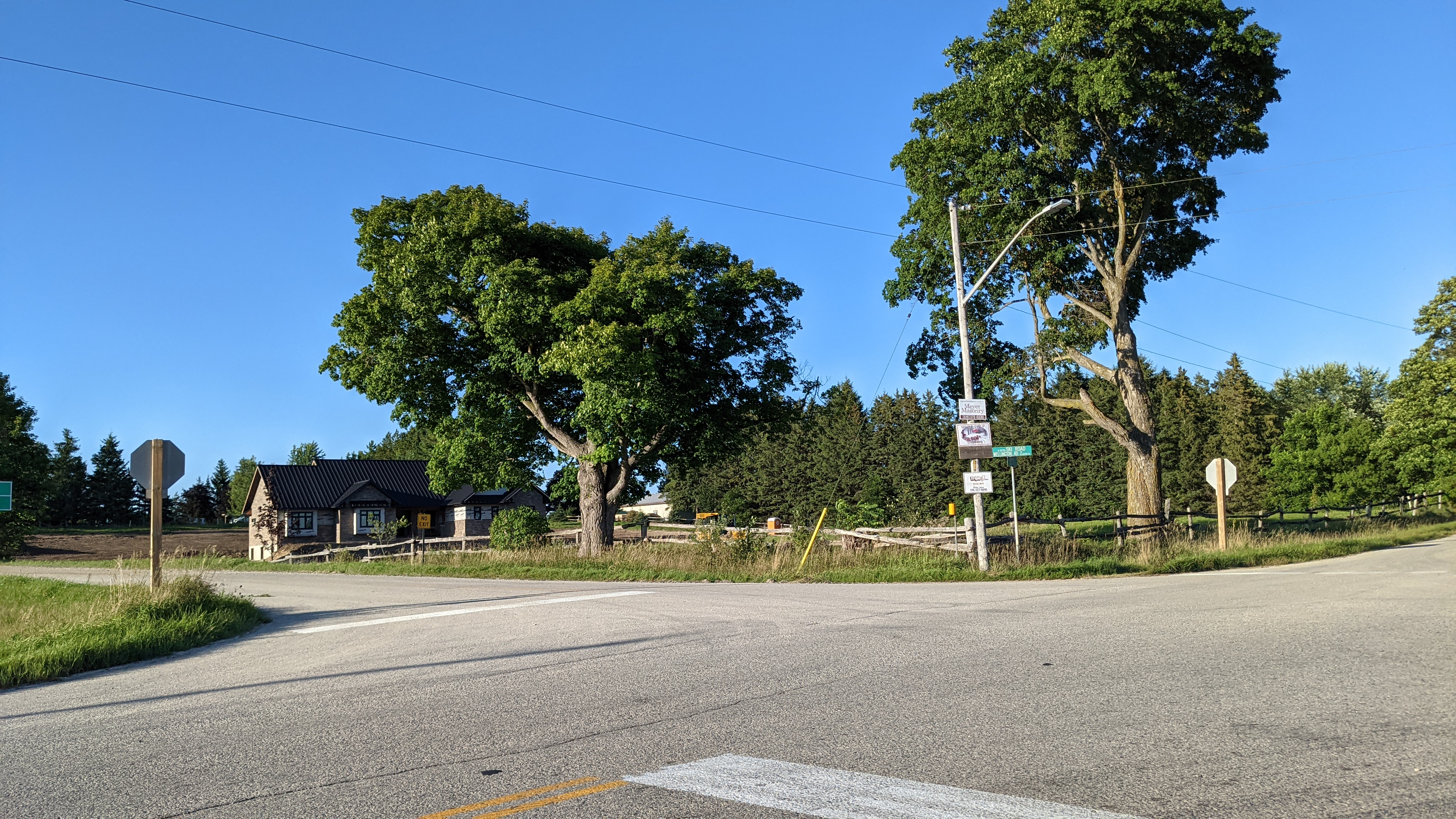
Drew, Ontario

== Geography ==
Drew is situated between the communities of Harriston, Palmerston, Clifford, Mount Forest, and Ayton. The main roads that run through Drew are Wellington Road 2 and Wellington Road 3, which is continuous with Ayton Road. The regions of Upper and Lower Drew are divided at the approximate border of Wellington Road 2, near the Drew Ball Diamond.

== History ==
Drew was named in 1879 after Judge George Alexander Drew of Elora.

Drew's rich brown-grey clay opened the door to a booming brick industry in the late 1880s through to the early 1900s. The resulting cream-yellow bricks are still evident in many of the region's farmhouses and schoolhouses.

The first settlers in Drew included the Milne and Bell families in the 1850s. The families Cardwell, Burton, Preston, Colquhouns and Hetherington, Keddedy, Cox, and Bunton followed. The 1860s and 1870s saw the settling of Miller, Crow, Whetham, Gibson, Arthurs, Hurd, Nixon, Cassidy, Grice, Morrison, Hart, Bishop, Donaldson and Shannon, many of whose descendants still reside in the region.

Drew has a rich sporting history. The early settlers participated in football, followed by the introduction of baseball and softball teams including the famed "Drew Swampmonsters" slowpitch team (the name owing to the swamp that lay beyond the outfield fence). The local kids participated in pick-up hockey on area ponds in the winter before the emergence of the Drew hockey team in the 1960s, which played home games at the Clifford Arena.
