= Tolton =

Tolton may refer to:

People:

- Augustine Tolton or Augustus Tolton (1854–1897), the first black Roman Catholic priest in the United States
- Edwin Tolton (1856–1917), a farmer, grain merchant and political figure in Ontario, Canada

Other:

- Father Tolton Regional Catholic High School, a high school Columbia, Missouri
- Edward Tolton House, a property on the National Register of Historic Places in Beaver County, Utah, United States
- Tolton Center, an adult education outreach program that is part of the De La Salle Institute in Chicago, Illinois, United States
