= John Pritchard (Canadian politician) =

Canadian politician

Member of Parliament for Wellington North
- In office December 1921 – September 1925
- Preceded by: William Aurelius Clarke
- Succeeded by: Duncan Sinclair

Personal details
- Born: 30 August 1861 Durham County, Canada West
- Died: 22 February 1941 (aged 79)
- Party: Progressive
- Profession: farmer

John Pritchard (30 August 1861 – 22 February 1941) was a Progressive party member of the House of Commons of Canada. He was born in Durham County, Canada West and became a farmer.

He was elected to Parliament at the Wellington North riding in the 1921 general election. After serving his only federal term, the 14th Canadian Parliament, Pritchard was defeated by Duncan Sinclair of the Conservatives in the 1925 federal election.
