= 1999–2000 WOAA Senior League season =

- League: WOAA Senior AA Hockey League
- Sport: Hockey
- Duration: Regular season October 1999 – February 2000; Playoffs; February 2000 – April 2000
- Teams: 14
- Finals champions: Sr. "AA" Champions - Milverton Four Wheel Drives; Sr. "A" Champions - Monkton Wildcats

WOAA Senior League seasons
- 1998–99 2000–01

The 1999–2000 WOAA Senior League season was the 10th season of the WOAA Senior AA Hockey League. The league played a regular season schedule which began in October 1999 and concluded in February 2000. The post-season began in February 2000 and concluded in April 2000.

The Milverton Four Wheel Drives won the Sr. "AA" championship, defeating the Palmerston 81's in six games. The Monkton Wildcats won the Sr. "A" championship.

== Team changes ==
- The league was re-organized into two divisions, the North Division and the South Division.
- The Tavistock Royals returned to the league after a one-year absence and joins the South Division.
- The Wingham Spitfires joined the league as an expansion team and joins the North Division.
- The Mildmay Monarchs took a leave of absence.
- The Arthur Tigers folded.
- The Dundalk Flyers folded.

== Final standings ==
Note: GP = Games played; W = Wins; L= Losses; OTL = Overtime losses; GF = Goals for; GA = Goals against; Pts = Points; Green shade = Clinched "AA" playoff spot

Rank	North Division	GP	W	L	T	OTL	Pts	GF	GA
1	Palmerston 81's	24	19	4	0	1	39	163	87
2	Durham Thundercats	24	17	4	2	1	37	178	87
3	Wingham Bulls	24	15	3	5	1	36	120	72
4	Shelburne Muskies	24	12	8	2	2	28	142	130
5	Wiarton Redmen	24	9	15	0	0	18	98	144
6	Elora Rocks	24	6	15	1	2	15	92	139
7	Lucknow Lancers	24	1	23	0	0	2	67	201

Rank	South Division	GP	W	L	T	OTL	Pts	GF	GA
1	Milverton Four Wheel Drives	24	19	4	1	0	39	192	88
2	Hensall Sherwoods	24	18	5	1	0	37	162	96
3	Wellesley Merchants	24	17	7	0	0	34	126	68
4	Clinton Radar	24	11	10	2	1	25	117	113
5	Goderich Pirates	24	8	14	1	1	18	134	175
6	Monkton Wildcats	24	8	14	1	1	18	71	195
7	Tavistock Royals	24	0	24	0	0	0	55	222

=== Scoring leaders ===
Note: GP = Games played; G = Goals; A = Assists; Pts = Points; PIM = Penalty minutes

Player	Team	GP	G	A	Pts	PIM
Rob LeBlanc	Durham Thundercats	24	31	31	62	56
Rene Daigle	Milverton Four Wheel Drives	24	28	27	55	50
Sean Burton	Goderich Pirates	23	27	27	54	0
Chris Kennedy	Hensall Sherwoods	21	26	28	54	95
Sean McCann	Hensall Sherwoods	23	23	31	54	12
Dave Ritchie	Shelburne Muskies	23	27	23	50	40
Jeff Rahn	Durham Thundercats	23	21	29	50	32
Derrick Robson	Durham Thundercats	22	18	29	47	70
Ron Bowman	Milverton Four Wheel Drives	23	15	31	46	16
Chris Downie	Hensall Sherwoods	21	19	25	44	41

== Sr. "AA" playoffs ==
=== Sr. "AA" playoff bracket ===
Division semi-finals
N1	Palmerston	4
N4	Shelburne	2
N2	Durham	4
N3	Wingham	0
S1	Milverton	4
S4	Clinton	2
S2	Hensall	4
S3	Wellesley	2

Division finals
N1	Palmerston	4
N2	Durham	3
S1	Milverton	4
S2	Hensall	2

Sr. "AA" finals
N1	Palmerston	0
S1	Milverton	4

==== WOAA Sr. "AA" division semi-finals ====
===== (N1) Palmerston 81's vs. (N4) Shelburne Muskies =====
February 11	Shelburne Muskies	2 – 5	Palmerston 81's	Palmerston

February 12	Palmerston 81's	2 – 5	Shelburne Muskies	Shelburne

February 18	Shelburne Muskies	7 – 5	Palmerston 81's	Palmerston

February 19	Palmerston 81's	5 – 2	Shelburne Muskies	Shelburne

February 20	Shelburne Muskies	2 – 6	Palmerston 81's	Palmerston

February 27	Shelburne Muskies	5 – 6	Palmerston 81's	Palmerston

Palmerston wins series 4 – 2

===== (N2) Durham Thundercats vs. (N3) Wingham Spitfires =====
February 11	Wingham Spitfires	5 – 8	Durham Thundercats	Durham

February 13	Durham Thundercats	5 – 2	Wingham Spitfires	Wingham

February 18	Wingham Spitfires	5 – 10	Durham Thundercats	Durham

February 19	Durham Thundercats	5 – 2	Wingham Spitfires	Wingham

Durham wins series 4 – 0

===== (S1) Milverton Four Wheel Drives vs. (S4) Clinton Radar =====
February 12	Clinton Radar	3 – 4	Milverton Four Wheel Drives	Milverton

February 18	Milverton Four Wheel Drives	3 – 2	Clinton Radar	Clinton

February 19	Clinton Radar	2 – 5	Milverton Four Wheel Drives	Milverton

February 25	Milverton Four Wheel Drives	3 – 5	Clinton Radar	Clinton

February 26	Clinton Radar	4 – 2	Milverton Four Wheel Drives	Milverton

February 27	Milverton Four Wheel Drives	4 – 3	2OT	Clinton Radar	Clinton

Milverton wins series 4 – 2

===== (S2) Hensall Sherwoods vs. (S3) Wellesley Merchants =====
February 12	Wellesley Merchants	4 – 5	OT	Hensall Sherwoods	Hensall

February 18	Hensall Sherwoods	4 – 9	Wellesley Merchants	Wellesley

February 19	Wellesley Merchants	3 – 5	Hensall Sherwoods	Hensall

February 20	Hensall Sherwoods	4 – 5	OT	Wellesley Merchants	Wellesley

February 23	Wellesley Merchants	4 – 7	Hensall Sherwoods	Hensall

February 25	Hensall Sherwoods	12 – 1	Wellesley Merchants	Wellesley

Hensall wins series 4 – 2

==== WOAA Sr. "AA" division finals ====
===== (N1) Palmerston 81's vs. (N2) Durham Thundercats =====
March 4	Palmerston 81's	3 – 1	Durham Thundercats	Durham

March 5	Durham Thundercats	7 – 3	Palmerston 81's	Palmerston

March 10	Durham Thundercats	7 – 1	Palmerston 81's	Palmerston

March 11	Palmerston 81's	7 – 3	Durham Thundercats	Durham

March 12	Durham Thundercats	5 – 6	OT	Palmerston 81's	Palmerston

March 18	Palmerston 81's	2 – 6	Durham Thundercats	Durham

March 19	Durham Thundercats	1 – 3	Palmerston 81's	Palmerston

Palmerston wins series 4 – 3

===== (S1) Milverton Four Wheel Drives vs. (S2) Hensall Sherwoods =====
March 4	Hensall Sherwoods	7 – 4	Milverton Four Wheel Drives	Milverton

March 10	Milverton Four Wheel Drives	8 – 7	2OT	Hensall Sherwoods	Hensall

March 12	Hensall Sherwoods	4 – 5	OT	Milverton Four Wheel Drives	Milverton

March 17	Milverton Four Wheel Drives	6 – 3	Hensall Sherwoods	Hensall

March 18	Hensall Sherwoods	5 – 4	Milverton Four Wheel Drives	Milverton

March 19	Milverton Four Wheel Drives	4 – 3	Hensall Sherwoods	Hensall

Milverton wins series 4 – 2

==== WOAA Sr. "AA" finals ====
===== (S1) Milverton Four Wheel Drives vs. (N1) Palmerston 81's =====
March 25	Palmerston 81's	2 – 3	Milverton Four Wheel Drives	Milverton

March 26	Milverton Four Wheel Drives	5 – 2	Palmerston 81's	Palmerston

April 1	Palmerston 81's	1 – 5	Milverton Four Wheel Drives	Milverton

April 2	Milverton Four Wheel Drives	5 – 4	Palmerston 81's	Palmerston

Milverton wins series 4 – 0

== Sr. "A" playoffs ==
=== Sr. "A" playoff bracket ===
Division finals
N1	Elora	4
N2	Lucknow	3
S1	Goderich	3
S2	Monkton	4

Sr. "A" finals
N6	Elora	1
S6	Monkton	4

==== WOAA Sr. "A" qualifying round ====
Rank	North Division	GP	W	L	Pts	GF	GA
1	Elora Rocks	4	3	1	6	27	21
2	Lucknow Lancers	4	2	2	4	23	22
3	Wiarton Redmen	4	1	3	2	15	22

Rank	South Division	GP	W	L	Pts	GF	GA
1	Goderich Pirates	4	3	1	6	23	17
2	Monkton Wildcats	4	2	2	4	20	15
3	Tavistock Royals	4	1	3	2	14	25

==== WOAA Sr. "A" divisional semi-finals ====
===== (N1) Elora Rocks vs. (N2) Lucknow Lancers =====
March 3	Lucknow Lancers	6 – 8	Elora Rocks	Elora

March 4	Elora Rocks	4 – 6	Lucknow Lancers	Lucknow

March 10	Lucknow Lancers	1 – 4	Elora Rocks	Elora

March 11	Elora Rocks	6 – 1	Lucknow Lancers	Lucknow

March 17	Lucknow Lancers	4 – 2	Elora Rocks	Elora

March 18	Elora Rocks	4 – 8	Lucknow Lancers	Lucknow

March 22	Lucknow Lancers	3 – 4	OT	Elora Rocks	Elora

Elora wins series 4 – 3

===== (S1) Godrich Pirates vs. (S2) Monkton Wildcats =====
March 3	Monkton Wildcats	0 – 3	Goderich Pirates	Goderich

March 5	Goderich Pirates	2 – 8	Monkton Wildcats	Monkton

March 10	Monkton Wildcats	2 – 7	Goderich Pirates	Goderich

March 11	Goderich Pirates	1 – 9	Monkton Wildcats	Monkton

March 16	Monkton Wildcats	4 – 3	OT	Goderich Pirates	Goderich

March 17	Goderich Pirates	6 – 3	Monkton Wildcats	Monkton

March 19	Monkton Wildcats	5 – 4	Goderich Pirates	Goderich

Monkton wins series 4 – 3

==== WOAA Sr. "A" finals ====
===== (S2) Monkton Wildcats vs. (N1) Elora Rocks =====
March 24	Elora Rocks	3 – 4	Monkton Wildcats	Monkton

March 26	Monkton Wildcats	1 – 4	Elora Rocks	Elora

April 1	Elora Rocks	1 – 3	Monkton Wildcats	Monkton

April 2	Monkton Wildcats	6 – 4	Elora Rocks	Elora

April 5	Elora Rocks	4 – 5	Monkton Wildcats	Monkton

Monkton wins series 4 – 1
