= Duncan Sinclair (Conservative politician) =

Canadian politician

Member of Parliament for Wellington North
- In office October 1925 – May 1930
- Preceded by: John Pritchard
- Succeeded by: John Knox Blair

Personal details
- Born: 29 January 1869 Minto Township, Ontario
- Died: 21 June 1951 (aged 82)
- Party: Conservative
- Spouse(s): Martha A. McEachern m. 15 January 1894
- Profession: Salesman

Duncan Sinclair (29 January 1869 – 21 June 1951) was a Conservative member of the House of Commons of Canada. He was born in Minto Township, Ontario and became a salesman.

He was first elected to Parliament at the Wellington North riding in the 1925 general election, then re-elected there in 1926. Sinclair was defeated by John Knox Blair of the Liberals in the 1930 federal election. Sinclair made an unsuccessful bid to unseat Knox in the 1935 election.
