= Thomas Martin (Canadian politician) =

Canadian politician

Member of the Canadian Parliament for Wellington North
- In office 1904–1907
- Preceded by: Edwin Tolton
- Succeeded by: Alexander Munro Martin

Personal details
- Born: May 21, 1850 Fergus, Canada West
- Died: March 12, 1907 (aged 56)
- Party: Liberal

Thomas Martin (May 21, 1850 – March 12, 1907) was a Canadian politician.

Born in Fergus, Canada West, the son of John Martin and Jean Munro, both of Scotland, Martin educated at Mount Forest, Ontario. A miller by profession, he was a Councillor and Mayor of Mount Forest. He was elected to the House of Commons of Canada for the riding of Wellington North in 1904 federal election. A Liberal, he died in office in 1907. His brother, Alexander Munro Martin, was elected to the same riding in the resulting by-election.
