= Alexander Munro Martin =

Canadian politician

Alexander Munro Martin (December 21, 1852 – December 2, 1915) was a businessman and political figure in Ontario, Canada. He represented Wellington North in the House of Commons of Canada from 1907 to 1911 as a Liberal.

He was born in Fergus, Canada West, the son of John Martin and Jean Munro, both natives of Scotland, and moved to Mount Forest with his parents in 1856. In 1871, with his brother Thomas, Martin entered the family milling business, which included several sawmills, a grist mill, a planing mill and mills to manufacture barrels. The two brothers took over the operation of the mills following John Martin's death in 1883. In 1883, Martin married Margaret Broadfoot. He served on the council for Mount Forest, also serving as reeve. Martin was first elected to the House of Commons in a 1907 by-election held following the death of his brother Thomas. He was reelected in the 1908 federal election but defeated when he ran for re-election in 1911. Martin died in Regina at the age of 62.
