= Lewis Menary =

Canadian politician

Member of Parliament for Wellington North
- In office June 1945 – June 1949
- Preceded by: John Knox Blair
- Succeeded by: Arnold Darroch

Personal details
- Born: 8 October 1882 Amaranth Township, Ontario
- Died: 24 April 1956 (aged 73)
- Party: Progressive Conservative
- Spouse(s): Lucy May Taylor m. 13 April 1910
- Profession: farmer, merchant

Lewis Menary (8 October 1882 – 24 April 1956) was a Progressive Conservative party member of the House of Commons of Canada. He was born in Amaranth Township, Ontario, and became a farmer and merchant by career. Menary served as reeve of Grand Valley in 1910 and 1911.

He was first elected to Parliament at the Wellington North riding in the 1945 general election after an unsuccessful attempt there in the 1940 election. Menary was defeated in the 1949 election by Arnold Darroch of the Liberal Party.
