= Nathaniel Higinbotham =

Canadian politician

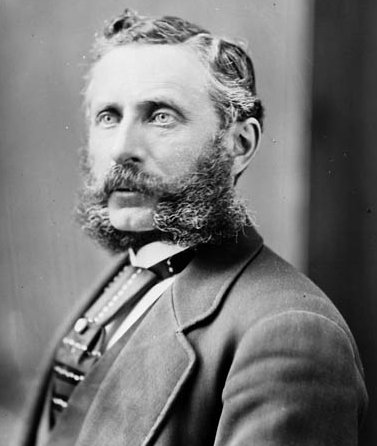

Member of the Canadian Parliament for Wellington North
- In office 1872–1878
- Preceded by: George Alexander Drew
- Succeeded by: George Alexander Drew

Personal details
- Born: 1830 County Cavan, Ireland
- Died: January 9, 1911 (aged 80–81) Guelph, Ontario
- Party: Liberal

Nathaniel Higinbotham (1830 – January 9, 1911) was a Canadian pharmacist and political figure. He represented Wellington North in the House of Commons of Canada from 1872 to 1878 as a Liberal member.

He was born in County Cavan, Ireland and came to Canada in 1846, establishing himself as a chemist and druggist at Guelph. He served on the town council for Guelph, also serving as town mayor. He was a lieutenant-colonel for the local militia and served during the Fenian raids. Higinbotham was defeated by George Alexander Drew for the federal seat in 1878. He later served as registrar for Wellington County.

In 1862, he married Margaret Allan. Higinbotham died in Guelph at the age of 81.
