= John Kruspe =

Canadian football player (born 1944)

Profile
- Position: Running back

Personal information
- Born: July 5, 1944 (age 82); Clifford, Ontario, Canada
- Listed height: 5 ft 11 in (1.80 m)
- Listed weight: 190 lb (86 kg)

Career history
- 1969: Montreal Alouettes
- 1970–1974: Ottawa Rough Riders
- 1975: Hamilton Tiger-Cats

Awards and highlights
- Football OIFC Champion (1966); Football CCIFC Champion (1968); Grey Cup champion (1973); Wilfrid Laurier Sports Hall of Fame (1986) and then again (2011)

John Kruspe (born July 5, 1944) is a retired Canadian football player who played for the Montreal Alouettes, Ottawa Rough Riders and Hamilton Tiger-Cats. He previously played football at Waterloo Lutheran (now Wilfrid Laurier University). Laurier has inducted him into their Sports Hall of Fame twice, once in 1986 and then again in 2011. John was a member of the Ottawa Rough Riders team that beat out the Edmonton Eskimos during the 1973 Grey Cup Championship in Toronto at Exhibition Stadium. He returned to Ottawa from Hamilton with his wife Bonny Kruspe (Reading) and their son Jory upon retirement from the game. He would soon become a school Principal with the Ottawa Board of Education and have a second son Tyler.
