= George Alexander Drew (Liberal-Conservative MP) =

Canadian politician

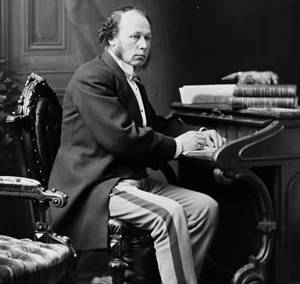
George Alexander Drew Source: Library and Archives Canada

George Alexander Drew, QC (February 21, 1826 – July 5, 1891) was a Canadian lawyer, judge and political figure. He represented Wellington North in the House of Commons of Canada as a Liberal-Conservative member from 1867 to 1872 and from 1878 to 1882.

He was born near Williamstown, Upper Canada, the son of John Drew and Margaret McKay, and was educated there and in Cornwall. Drew studied law with John Sandfield Macdonald in Cornwall, was called to the bar in 1854 and set up practice in Elora. In 1856, he married Elizabeth Mary Jacob; in 1865, after his first wife's death, he married her sister, Maria Louise. Drew was named Queen's Counsel in 1872.

Drew ran unsuccessfully against Nathaniel Higinbotham for the federal seat in 1872, 1874 and 1875 before defeating him in 1878. In 1882, he was named judge for Wellington County; later that same year, he was named judge in the High Court of Justice for Ontario. Drew died while still a judge at the age of 65.

The community of Drew, Ontario in Minto Township was named after him.

His grandson, George A. Drew, later served as Premier of Ontario.

1867 Canadian federal election: Wellington North
Party	Candidate	Votes	%	±%
Liberal–Conservative	George Alexander Drew	1,493		
Unknown	Michael Hamilton Foley	1,271		
Eligible voters		3,476		
Source: Canadian Parliamentary Guide, 1871

1872 Canadian federal election: Wellington North
Party	Candidate	Votes
Liberal	Nathaniel Higinbotham	1,264
Liberal–Conservative	George Alexander Drew	1,204
Source: Canadian Elections Database

1874 Canadian federal election: Wellington North
Party	Candidate	Votes	%	±%
Liberal	Nathaniel Higinbotham	1,470		
Liberal–Conservative	George Alexander Drew	1,464		
Source: lop.parl.ca

By-election: On Mr. Higinbotham being unseated on petition, 18 March 1875: Wellington North
Party	Candidate	Votes	%	±%
Liberal	Nathaniel Higinbotham	1,368		
Liberal–Conservative	George Alexander Drew	1,365		

1878 Canadian federal election: Wellington North
Party	Candidate	Votes	%	±%
Liberal–Conservative	George Alexander Drew	1,713		
Liberal	Nathaniel Higinbotham	1,605		
