= Arnold Darroch =

Canadian politician

Member of Parliament for Wellington North
- In office June 1949 – August 1953
- Preceded by: Lewis Menary
- Succeeded by: riding dissolved

Personal details
- Born: 26 May 1898 Lakelet, Ontario, Canada
- Died: 12 October 1974 (aged 76) Hanover, Ontario, Canada
- Party: Liberal
- Spouse(s): Edna McCulloch m. 26 November 1924
- Profession: farmer

Arnold Nay Darroch (26 May 1898 – 12 October 1974) was a Liberal party member of the House of Commons of Canada. He was born in Lakelet, Ontario and became a farmer by career.

Darroch became a councillor in Clifford, Ontario in 1934 and became the municipality's reeve in 1936. He was a warden of Wellington County in 1939, while remaining Clifford's reeve until 1944.

He was first elected to Parliament at the Wellington North riding in the 1949 general election after a previous unsuccessful campaign there in 1945. After his only term in the House of Commons, ridings were restructured and he campaigned in the Wellington—Huron riding where he was defeated by Marvin Howe of the Progressive Conservative party in the 1953 election. Darroch then unsuccessfully attempted to unseat Howe in the 1957 election.

He died in 1974.
