= John Knox Blair =

Canadian politician

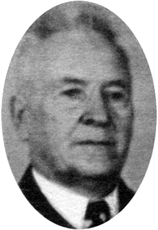

Member of the Canadian Parliament for Wellington North
- In office 1930–1945
- Preceded by: Duncan Sinclair
- Succeeded by: Lewis Menary

Personal details
- Born: September 19, 1873 Caledon, Ontario, Canada
- Died: November 11, 1950 (aged 77)
- Party: Liberal
- Occupation: physician, teacher

John Knox Blair (September 19, 1873 – November 11, 1950) was a Canadian politician, physician and teacher. He was elected to the House of Commons of Canada in the 1930 election as a Member of the Liberal Party to represent the riding of Wellington North. He was re-elected in 1935 and 1940.

== Early life and career ==
Blair was born in Caledon, Ontario, Canada. After graduating from high school Dr. Blair attended teacher's college. He taught school for four years before entering the University of Toronto where he graduated in medicine in 1906. He spent the following year as an intern, first at the Royal Alexandra Hospital (Groves Memorial) in Fergus, Ontario with the noted surgeon Dr. Abraham Groves, and then at the Burnside Maternity Hospital in Toronto where he gained experience in obstetrics. In 1907 he moved to Cutler in Northern Ontario under contract to the lumbering companies in that area. During the next few years he practiced in Ethel and then Rosemont, finally settling in Arthur, Ontario in 1918. He was a family doctor who gained a reputation as an exceptional obstetrician and as a keen diagnostician in the days before diagnostic tools such as X-rays were available.

== Political career ==
In 1930 the Liberal Association of North Wellington offered him the nomination for the upcoming federal election. North Wellington was a largely rural riding and had sent a Conservative member to Ottawa for many years. A Conservative majority government was elected that year under R. B. Bennett, however Dr. Blair won this seat for the Liberals and held it for the next 15 years until he retired in 1945.

He was on a number of Parliamentary Committees including the Special Committee on the Criminal Code, the Standing Committee on Agriculture and Colonization, and the Standing Committee on Banking and Commerce.

Reminiscing about Dr. Blair’s life as a Member of Parliament the Guelph Mercury summarized his career in an article published on May 20, 1950. "In his parliamentary career, he was a constant advocate of such things as pensions for the aged and the principle of family allowances.he stood, too, for the elimination of capital punishment by hanging and was a consistent advocate of reciprocity and greater trade with the United States." On many of these issues Dr. Blair was well in advance of his times. The Old Age Pension was introduced in 1927 but it was not until 1951 that it became universal and without restrictions. The Family Allowance Act was passed in 1944 by a unanimous vote while Dr. Blair was still a sitting Member of Parliament. The death penalty was not eliminated until 1976, and the Free Trade Agreement was not enacted until 1987.

== Personal life ==
In 1908 he married Bertha Susan McDowell, a nurse from Fergus. Dr. and Mrs Blair had three sons, Angus, Kenneth and Norman and eight grandchildren.
