= Minto Flywheel Facility =

Canadian grid frequency regulation facility

The Minto Flywheel Facility for grid frequency regulation was the first in Canada.

The 2 MW (for 15 min) flywheel storage facility in Minto Ontario, Canada opened in 2014.

The flywheel system (developed by NRStor and built by Temporal Power) uses 10 spinning steel flywheels on magnetic bearings.
