= Mike Schmidt (ice hockey) =

German ice hockey player

Personal information
- Nationality: German
- Born: 23 May 1961 (age 63); Palmerston, Ontario, Canada

Sport
- Sport: Ice hockey

Mike Schmidt (born 23 May 1961) is a German ice hockey player. He competed in the men's tournament at the 1992 Winter Olympics.
