= Palmerston Railway Heritage Museum =

Canadian railway museum

Coordinates: 43.8324°N 80.8491°W

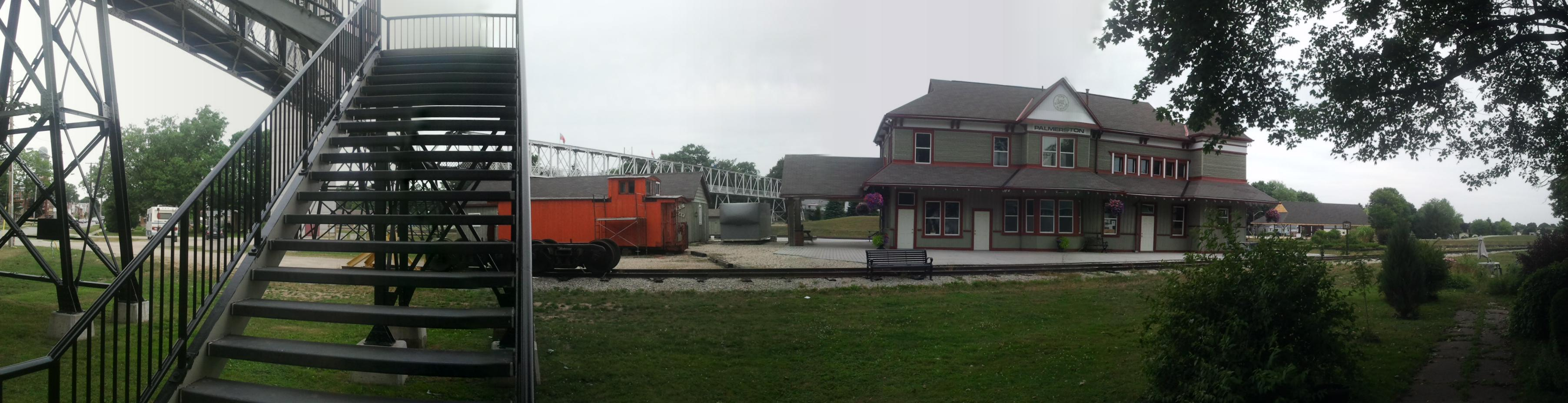
Panoramic view of Palmerston Railway Heritage Museum.

The Palmerston Railway Heritage Museum is the only original station left in Wellington County, Ontario and one of the few designated as a railway museum in its part of the province. The Palmerston Station is located at 166 William Street, Palmerston, Ontario.

== Early history ==
Palmerston Railway Station is directly linked to the development of the Town of Palmerston. With the first station being built on Lot 19, Concession 11 of Wallace Township, Perth County. Built in 1871, by the Wellington, Grey and Bruce Railway, at the point where the southern extension branched off from the main Guelph-Harriston line. This first station was a single story building, around which the town eventually developed.

In 1876, due to the increasing amount of traffic through the station, railway officials had an additional story put on the station. This second story was used to house the offices, which left the lower floor to be used exclusively for waiting and baggage rooms.

== The Grand Trunk Railway ==
When the Grand Trunk Railway took over in 1900, the station underwent another transformation. To help compete with the Canadian Pacific Railway, the Grand Trunk Railway upgraded their stations. Palmerston appears to have benefitted the most from this decision. They added a West Elevation in front of the station and created a walk-in storage attic. A tower (which does not appear to have had an entrance) was built above the ladies washroom. This tower was destroyed by fire in 1912.

== Canadian National Railway ==
After the Canadian National Railway had taken over the Grand Trunk Railway, the station underwent another transformation. During the Depression, the CNR installed a drop ceiling in the main waiting room to save on heating costs. In 1936 it was painted in CNR colours. By the early 1950s, the traditional board and batten had been covered up by insulbrick which was then painted red. By 1959 the steam locomotives had been replaced by diesel locomotives, which led to the removal of the roundhouse, roundtable and coal sheds.

== Abandonment ==
In 1970, the last passenger train left the station. However, unlike other stations which were being abandoned or torn down, the Palmerston station remained as an active freight center until the mid-1980s when the CNR requested the right to abandon the rail line through Palmerston. The station was officially closed in 1982. It remained abandoned until 1996, when the track was torn up from Harriston to Stratford.

== Restoration ==
On June 3, 1996, the Town of Palmerston presented an offer to the CNR to purchase the railway property. Later that year resident volunteers began to organize a restoration effort and solicit money to replace the leaking roof. By 1998, the Town of Palmerston was able to fully purchase the 26-acre (110,000 m^{2}) yard from the CNR, and initiated the CN Property Task Force which was responsible for overseeing the development of the property and renovation of the Station.

With the help of volunteers and Palmerston's Lions Club, the major renovations began which have led the station's present appearance. It has been returned to its 1900 Grand Trunk look, by having the insulbrick removed, board and batten replaced and the drop ceiling removed. The original wood of the ceiling was professionally grained to simulate its original appearance. The Agent's Office was stripped down to its original tine ceiling and the Conductor's Room was converted into a kitchen by the Lions Club.

In 2024 the resident volunteers announced plans to restore a 1947 caboose that had been donated to the museum several years prior. The Caboose Restoration Project began in the spring, with plans for the restoration to be completed in time for Palmerston's 150th anniversary. The project received $11,388 from the Rural Economic Development (RED) program and $4,500 from the Minto mayor's annual charity golf tournament.
