= George Norgan =

Canadian businessman and sport team owner

George William Norgan
- Born: July 11, 1885; Palmerston, Ontario, Canada
- Died: September 13, 1964 (aged 79)
- Occupations: Businessman, sports team owner
- Known for: Alcohol distributor, curler, and baseball team owner

George William Norgan (July 11, 1885 – September 13, 1964) was a Canadian alcohol distributor, curler, and baseball team owner.

== Early life ==
Norgan was born in Palmerston, Ontario on July 11, 1885. Despite leaving the town over 25 years prior, in 1947, Norgan built a 433-seat movie theatre in Palmerston with the stipulations that children receive a discounted rate and any revenue go towards beneficial works in the community.

== Business career ==
Norgan worked as an alcohol distributor. In 1927, he was indicted for conspiracy to violate the Volstead Act. In 1929, he was a founding officer and director of United Distillers of Canada. In 1952, Hyman Harvey Klein, a Baltimore liquor dealer who established a Cuban company with Norgan and his fellow United directors to sell Duncan Harwood whisky in Central and South America, testified before a United States House Committee on Ways and Means subcommittee investigating tax evaders. He stated that the company made about $20 million on a $4,000 investment despite never shipping liquor to Latin America. The following year, United Distillers was sold to a subsidiary of Seagram.

In 1954, the United States government charged Norgan and eight others with evading $16.4 million in federal income taxes by setting up foreign corporations to receive profits from liquor sales. He could not be extradited and never went on trial. United Distillers, Norgan, and two fellow directors were also sued by the widow of a former UDC director seeking a share of the profits made in the Latin American companies. The suit was settled out of court in 1957.

In 1954, Norgan was elected president of Coast Breweries, which changed its name to Lucky Lager. He was previously the brewery's managing director. In 1958, controlling interest was sold to Labatt and Norgan moved to the position of chairman.

Norgan also held interest in three Vancouver hotels – the Castle, Abbotsford, and Belmont.

== Sports ==
=== Curling ===
Norgan began curling in 1932 and was the lead for the British Columbia team in the 1937 Macdonald Brier. He was president of the Vancouver Curling Club and British Columbia's representative on the Dominion Curling Association executive committee.

In 1939, he broke ground on the VCC's new rink in Heather Park. He was elected president of the Dominion Curling Association in 1942 and led the organization until 1946. He was inducted into the Canadian Curling Hall of Fame in 1976.

=== Baseball ===
In 1942, Norgan purchased E. J. Schefter's interest in the Portland Beavers of the Pacific Coast League and was elected team president. In 1946, he purchased the interest of general manager Bill Klepper. Norgan also owned the Salem Senators of the Western International League.

Following his tax evasion indictment, a lien was placed on the Beavers. After the 1954 season, the club was sold to a group of Portland businessmen.

He was elected president of the PCL's Vancouver Mounties in 1962, but the club was dropped from the league at the end of the season when the Minnesota Twins ended their affiliation with the club. Norgan died in his sleep on September 13, 1964.
