= Margaret Hyndman =

Canadian lawyer

Margaret Paton Hyndman
- Born: August 7, 1901; Palmerston, Ontario
- Died: January 18, 1991 (aged 89); Toronto, Ontario
- Occupation: Lawyer

Margaret Hyndman (7 August 1901 – 18 January 1991) was a Canadian lawyer and women's rights advocate. One of the first women to be called to the bar in Canada, she was named to the Order of Canada in 1973.

== Early life ==
Hyndman was born August 7, 1901, in Palmerston, Ontario. Her parents were of Scottish descent and she had three sisters. After attending high school in Listowel, she moved to Toronto. While in the city she worked as a stenographer and got her self articled with the Law Society. Hyndman enrolled at Osgoode Hall Law School in 1921 and was called to the bar in 1926.

== Career ==
While studying for the bar exam, she worked as an articled clerk for F. W. Wegenast, doing much of the research for his book The law of Canadian companies. Later they partnered and founded Wegenast and Hyndman, with Hyndman acting as sole partner at the firm after Wegenast's death in 1942. She later practiced law as part of Wegenast, Hyndman & Kemp and with Cassels, Brock & Blackwell.

In 1938 Hyndman became the second woman in the British Commonwealth to be named King's Counsel. Hyndman was named an officer of the Order of Canada in 1973. Of her accomplishments as a woman lawyer, Hyndman told Maclean's in 1949: "Only the fact that I am a lawyer matters. That I am a woman is of no consequence. I make a point of not knowing how many women lawyers there are in Canada."

Among the notable cases Hyndman worked no was the Margarine Reference. Representing the Canadian Consumer's Association, she but before the Supreme Court of Canada the position of housewives operating with tight household budgets and the high cost of butter. The Court ultimately found that the Government of Canada had been acting beyond their power by forbidding the sale of margarine. She also worked on the Eastview Birth Control Trial and Canada (AG) v Lavell.

== Death ==
Hyndman died in Toronto on January 18, 1991.
