= Wellington North (Canadian electoral district) =

Former federal electoral district in Ontario, Canada

Ontario electoral district

Defunct federal electoral district
- Legislature: House of Commons
- District created: 1867
- District abolished: 1952
- First contested: 1867
- Last contested: 1949

Wellington North was a federal electoral district represented in the House of Commons of Canada from 1867 to 1953. It was located in the province of Ontario.

It was created by the British North America Act 1867 which divided the County of Wellington into North, South and Centre Ridings. The North Riding consisted initially of the Townships of Amaranth, Arthur, Luther, Minto, Maryborough, Peel, and the village of Mount Forest.

In 1872, the township of Peel was removed from the riding, and the Village of Mount Arthur was added. In 1882, the riding was re-defined to consist of the townships of Wallace, Minto, Arthur, Luther East, Luther West and Amaranth, the towns of Palmerston, Harriston and Mount Forest, and the villages of Arthur and Clifford.

In 1903, the Wellington's three ridings were combined into two: the north and the south ridings of Wellington. The north riding consisted of the townships of Arthur, Garafraxa West, Luther West, Maryborough, Minto and Peel, the towns of Harriston, Mount Forest and Palmerston, and the villages of Arthur, Clifford and Drayton.

In 1924, the riding was called "Wellington North" and defined as consisting of that part of the county of Wellington lying north of a line described as commencing at the southeast corner of the township of Garafraxa West and following its southerly and westerly boundaries and the southerly boundary of the township of Peel, to the south boundary of Wellington county.

In 1933, it was defined as consisting of the townships of Arthur, Erin, Garafraxa West, Maryborough, Minto, Peel and West Luther in Wellington county, and the townships of Garafraxa East and East Luther in the county of Dufferin. In 1947, it was defined to consist of the townships of Arthur, Erin, Garafraxa West, Maryborough, Minto, Peel and West Luther including the towns of Mount Forest and Palmerston in the county of Wellington, and the townships of Garafraxa East and Luther East in the county of Dufferin, but excluding the town of Orangeville.

The electoral district was abolished in 1952 when it was redistributed between Dufferin—Simcoe, Wellington South and Wellington—Huron ridings.

== Members of Parliament ==
This riding elected the following members of the House of Commons of Canada:

Parliament	Years	Member	Party
1st	1867–1872	George Alexander Drew	Liberal–Conservative
2nd	1872–1874	Nathaniel Higinbotham	Liberal
3rd	1874–1875	Nathaniel Higinbotham	Liberal
3rd	1875–1878	Nathaniel Higinbotham	Liberal
4th	1878–1882	George Alexander Drew	Liberal–Conservative
5th	1882–1887	James McMullen	Liberal
6th	1887–1891	James McMullen	Liberal
7th	1891–1896	James McMullen	Liberal
8th	1896–1900	James McMullen	Liberal
9th	1900–1904	Edwin Tolton	Conservative
10th	1904–1907†	Thomas Martin	Liberal
10th	1907–1908	Alexander Munro Martin	Liberal
11th	1908–1911	Alexander Munro Martin	Liberal
12th	1911–1917	William Aurelius Clarke	Conservative
13th	1917–1921	William Aurelius Clarke	Government (Unionist)
14th	1921–1925	John Pritchard	Progressive
15th	1925–1926	Duncan Sinclair	Conservative
16th	1926–1930	Duncan Sinclair	Conservative
17th	1930–1935	John Knox Blair	Liberal
18th	1935–1940	John Knox Blair	Liberal
19th	1940–1945	John Knox Blair	Liberal
20th	1945–1949	Lewis Menary	Progressive Conservative
21st	1949–1953	Arnold Darroch	Liberal
Riding dissolved into Wellington—Huron, Wellington South and Dufferin—Simcoe

== Election results ==
1867 Canadian federal election
Party	Candidate	Votes	%	±%
Liberal–Conservative	George Alexander Drew	1,493		
Unknown	Michael Hamilton Foley	1,271		
Eligible voters		3,476		
Source: Canadian Parliamentary Guide, 1871

1872 Canadian federal election
Party	Candidate	Votes
Liberal	Nathaniel Higinbotham	1,264
Liberal–Conservative	George Alexander Drew	1,204
Source: Canadian Elections Database

1874 Canadian federal election
Party	Candidate	Votes	%	±%
Liberal	Nathaniel Higinbotham	1,470		
Liberal–Conservative	George Alexander Drew	1,464		
Source: lop.parl.ca

By-election: On Mr. Higinbotham being unseated on petition, 18 March 1875: Wellington North
Party	Candidate	Votes	%	±%
Liberal	Nathaniel Higinbotham	1,368		
Liberal–Conservative	George Alexander Drew	1,365		

1878 Canadian federal election
Party	Candidate	Votes	%	±%
Liberal–Conservative	George Alexander Drew	1,713		
Liberal	Nathaniel Higinbotham	1,605		

1882 Canadian federal election
Party	Candidate	Votes	%	±%
Liberal	James McMullen	1,911		
Unknown	J. B. Plumb	1,891		

1887 Canadian federal election
Party	Candidate	Votes	%	±%
Liberal	James McMullen	2,543		
Conservative	Robert Gordon	2,175		

1891 Canadian federal election
Party	Candidate	Votes	%	±%
Liberal	James McMullen	2,486		
Conservative	L. H. Clarke	2,300		

1896 Canadian federal election
Party	Candidate	Votes	%	±%
Liberal	James McMullen	2,712		
Conservative	L. H. Clarke	2,550		

1900 Canadian federal election
Party	Candidate	Votes	%	±%
Conservative	Edwin Tolton	2,463		
Liberal	James McMullen	2,431		

By-election: On Mr. Martin's death, 20 October 1907: Wellington North
Party	Candidate	Votes	%	±%
Liberal	Alexander Munro Martin	2,338		
Conservative	Alex Hamilton	2,072		

1904 Canadian federal election
Party	Candidate	Votes	%	±%
Liberal	Thomas Martin	2,849		
Conservative	John McGowan	2,541		

1908 Canadian federal election
Party	Candidate	Votes	%	±%
Liberal	Alexander Munro Martin	2,651		
Conservative	William Aurelius Clarke	2,567		

1911 Canadian federal election
Party	Candidate	Votes	%	±%
Conservative	William Aurelius Clarke	2,530		
Liberal	Alexander Munro Martin	2,505		

1917 Canadian federal election
Party	Candidate	Votes	%	±%
Government (Unionist)	William Aurelius Clarke	3,492		
Opposition (Laurier Liberals)	James McEwing	1,998		

1921 Canadian federal election
Party	Candidate	Votes	%	±%
Progressive	John Pritchard	5,138		
Conservative	William Aurelius Clarke	3,874		

1925 Canadian federal election
Party	Candidate	Votes	%	±%
Conservative	Duncan Sinclair	4,152		
Progressive	John Pritchard	3,370		

1926 Canadian federal election
Party	Candidate	Votes	%	±%
Conservative	Duncan Sinclair	4,825		
Liberal	Richard Frederick Dale	4,452		

1930 Canadian federal election
Party	Candidate	Votes	%	±%
Liberal	John Knox Blair	4,716		
Conservative	Duncan Sinclair	4,626		
Source: lop.parl.ca

1935 Canadian federal election
Party	Candidate	Votes	%	±%
Liberal	John Knox Blair	7,063		
Conservative	Duncas Sinclair	4,485		
Reconstruction	Robert Hoath Smith	1,276		

1940 Canadian federal election
Party	Candidate	Votes	%	±%
Liberal	John Knox Blair	5,748		
National Government	Lewis Menary	4,266		

1945/06/11

1945 Canadian federal election
Party	Candidate	Votes	%	±%
Progressive Conservative	Lewis Menary	5,779		
Liberal	Arnold Darroch	5,764		
Co-operative Commonwealth	Harry Hall	457		

1949 Canadian federal election
Party	Candidate	Votes	%	±%
Liberal	Arnold Darroch	6,057		
Progressive Conservative	Lewis Menary	6,025		
Co-operative Commonwealth	Frank J. Heffernan	479		

== See also ==
- List of Canadian electoral districts
- Historical federal electoral districts of Canada
