= William Aurelius Clarke =

Canadian politician

William Aurelius Clarke (November 18, 1868 – February 5, 1940) was a merchant and political figure in Ontario, Canada. He represented Wellington North in the House of Commons of Canada from 1911 to 1921 as a Conservative.

He was born in Arthur, Ontario, the son of William Clarke and Margaret Dryden. Clarke entered business as a merchant in Palmerston. In 1893, he married S. Johnston. Clarke ran unsuccessfully for a seat in the House of Commons in 1908. He was a Unionist Party member from 1917 to 1921. Clarke was defeated when he ran for reelection in 1921. He died in Palmerston at the age of 71.
