= Norwell District Secondary School =

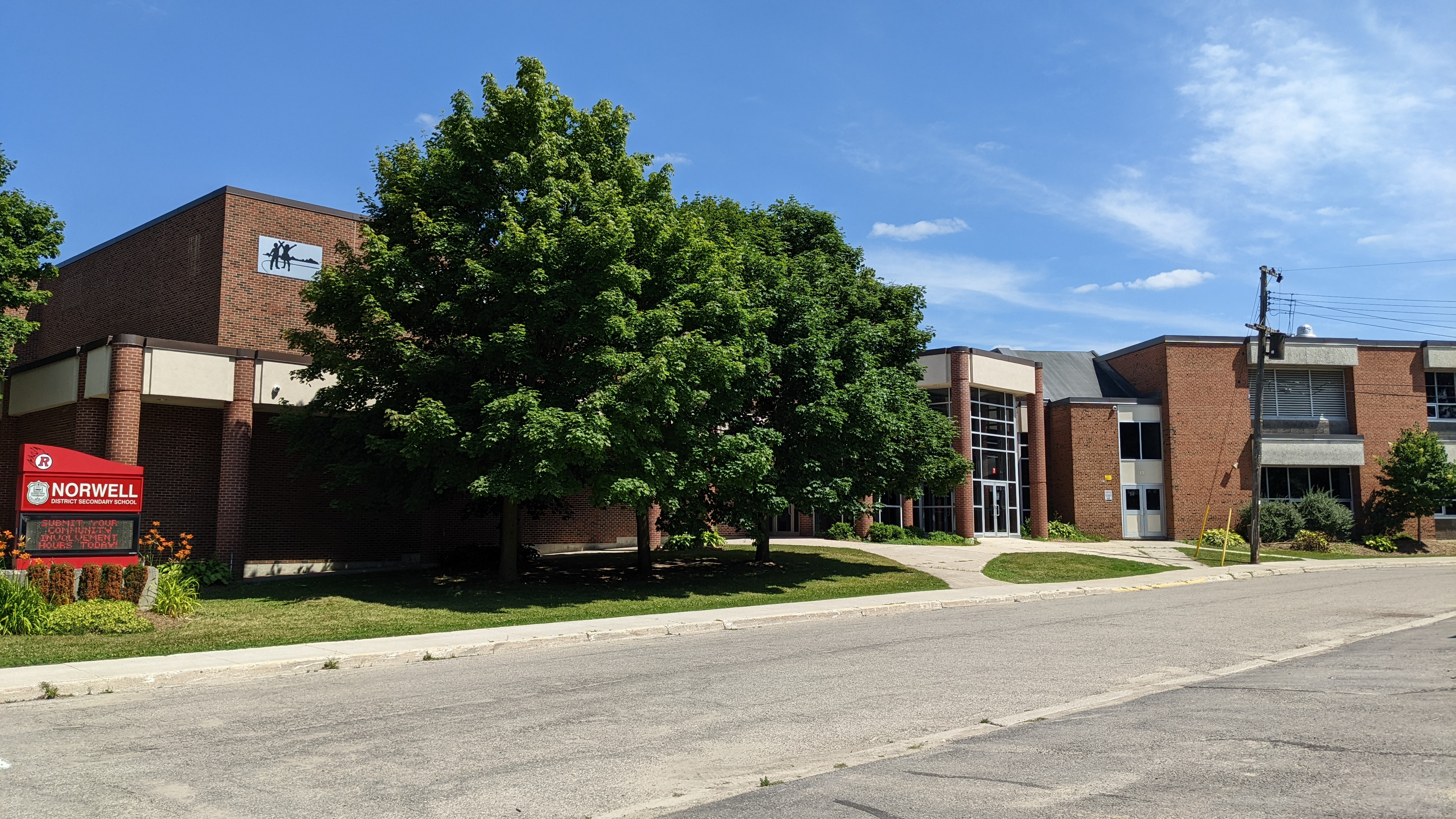

Location
- 135 Cumberland St. Palmerston, Ontario, N0G 2P0; Canada; 43°50′2″N 80°50′36″W

Information
- School type: Public, High school
- Motto: Qui se vincit fortiter stat (He who conquers himself stands strong)
- Founded: 1940
- School board: Upper Grand District School Board
- Superintendent: Matt McCutcheon
- Area trustee: Robin Ross
- School number: 931284
- Principal: Adam Rowden
- Grades: 9-12
- Enrollment: -795
- Language: English; French
- Colours: red, black, white
- Team name: Varsity Reds
- Classification: AA
- Website: www.ugdsb.ca/norwell/

Norwell District Secondary School, formerly known as Palmerston High School, and often simply called Norwell or NDSS, is a mid-sized composite high school located in Palmerston, Ontario. The school serves an area of approximately 500 km², including the communities of Palmerston, Harriston, Drayton, Clifford, Moorefield, Rothsay, and for French Immersion, students from more distant towns such as Mount Forest. Most students (over 90%) are bused in.

== Curriculum ==
=== Departments ===
- Art
- Business
- English
- Family Studies
- Geography
- Guidance/Career Studies
- History
- Languages
- Library
- Math
- Music
- Physical Education
- Science (and CELP)
- Special Education/Alternative Education
- Technology

== Extracurricular activities and clubs ==
Norwell District Secondary School’s athletic teams include badminton, basketball, cross country running, field hockey, ice hockey, soccer, track and field, and volleyball. The school hosts tournaments in ice hockey and volleyball, sports in which the school is competitive.

Cut the Mic, formerly known as Infrasonic, is an annual event at Norwell, usually held in April. Bands and musicians within the school perform for the community.

Norwell has held the Relay For Life since 2004 to fundraise for the Canadian Cancer Society. In the first five years of Relay For Life, the school has raised over $200,000 toward this cause.

== See also ==
- Education in Ontario
- List of secondary schools in Ontario
