= Clifford, Ontario =

Clifford
- Unincorporated community
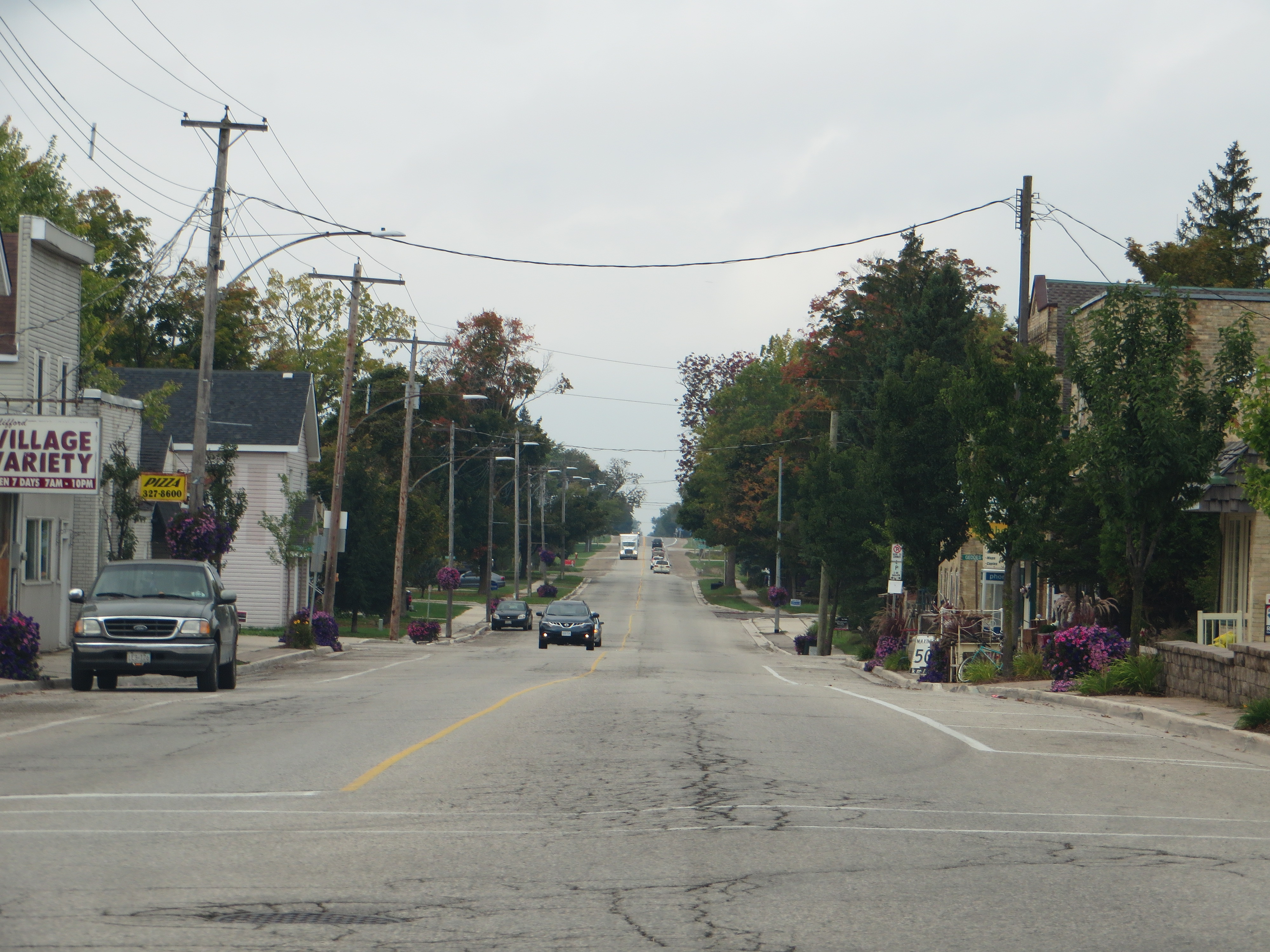

- Location in southern Ontario
- Coordinates: 43°58′09″N 80°58′45″W
- Country: Canada
- Province: Ontario
- County: Wellington
- Municipality: Minto
- Founded (as Minto Village): 1855
- Present Name: 1856
- Incorporated (village): 1873
- Amalgamated: 1999
- Named after: Clifford in West Yorkshire, England
- Elevation: 375 m (1,230 ft)

Population
  - Total: 800
- Time zone: UTC-5 (Eastern Time Zone)
  - Summer (DST): UTC-4 (Eastern Time Zone)
- Postal codes in Canada: N0G 1M0
- Area codes: 519, 226, 548

Clifford is an unincorporated community in the Town of Minto in Wellington County in Southwestern Ontario, Canada. It is on Ontario Highway 9 and Coon Creek, a stream in the Saugeen River drainage basin.

The village of Clifford was founded around 1855 as Minto Village. After the opening of the post office in 1856, the settlement was renamed Clifford by the first postmaster Francis Brown after Clifford in West Yorkshire, England. Clifford was incorporated as a village in 1873. In 1999, Clifford was amalgamated with Palmerston, Harriston and Minto Township to create Minto.

The first telephones in the community were installed in 1890 by Bell Canada. Wightman Telecom, based in Clifford and owned by the Wightman family, has owned and operated a communication system in Clifford since 1908, with a telephone system that was originally operated out of a kitchen in Howick Township. Wightman bought out Bell's operations in Clifford, Ayton and Neustadt in 1928. The firm continues to operate the system as of March 2016.

On 17 March 2016 a 200-metre (660 ft) wide EF1 tornado touched down near the community.

== Demographics ==
In the 2021 Census of Population conducted by Statistics Canada, Clifford had a population of 875 living in 377 of its 389 total private dwellings, a change of 6.3% from its 2016 population of 823. With a land area of 2.67 km^{2} (1.03 sq mi), it had a population density of 327.7/km^{2} (848.8/sq mi) in 2021.

== Notable people ==
=== Athletes ===
- John Kruspe (1944 – ), professional Canadian football player for the Montreal Alouettes, Ottawa Rough Riders and Hamilton Tiger-Cats of the Canadian Football League

=== Musicians ===
- Tara Dettman (???? – ), music artist and songwriter known for the song King Of My Heart, nominated in 2006 at the GMA Canada Covenant Awards

=== Politicians ===
- Absalom Shade Allan (1843 – 1928), represented Wellington West in the Legislative Assembly of Ontario from 1886 – 1894
- Arnold Darroch (1898 – 1974), Reeve of Clifford from 1936 – 1944 and represented Wellington North in the House of Commons of Canada from 1949 – 1953
- Hugh Elliott Eaglesham (1873 – 1938), member of the Legislative Assembly of Saskatchewan from 1934 – 1938
- Edwin Tolton (1856 – 1917), represented Wellington North in the House of Commons of Canada from 1900 – 1904
