= Minto, Ontario =

Minto
- Town (lower-tier)
- Town of Minto
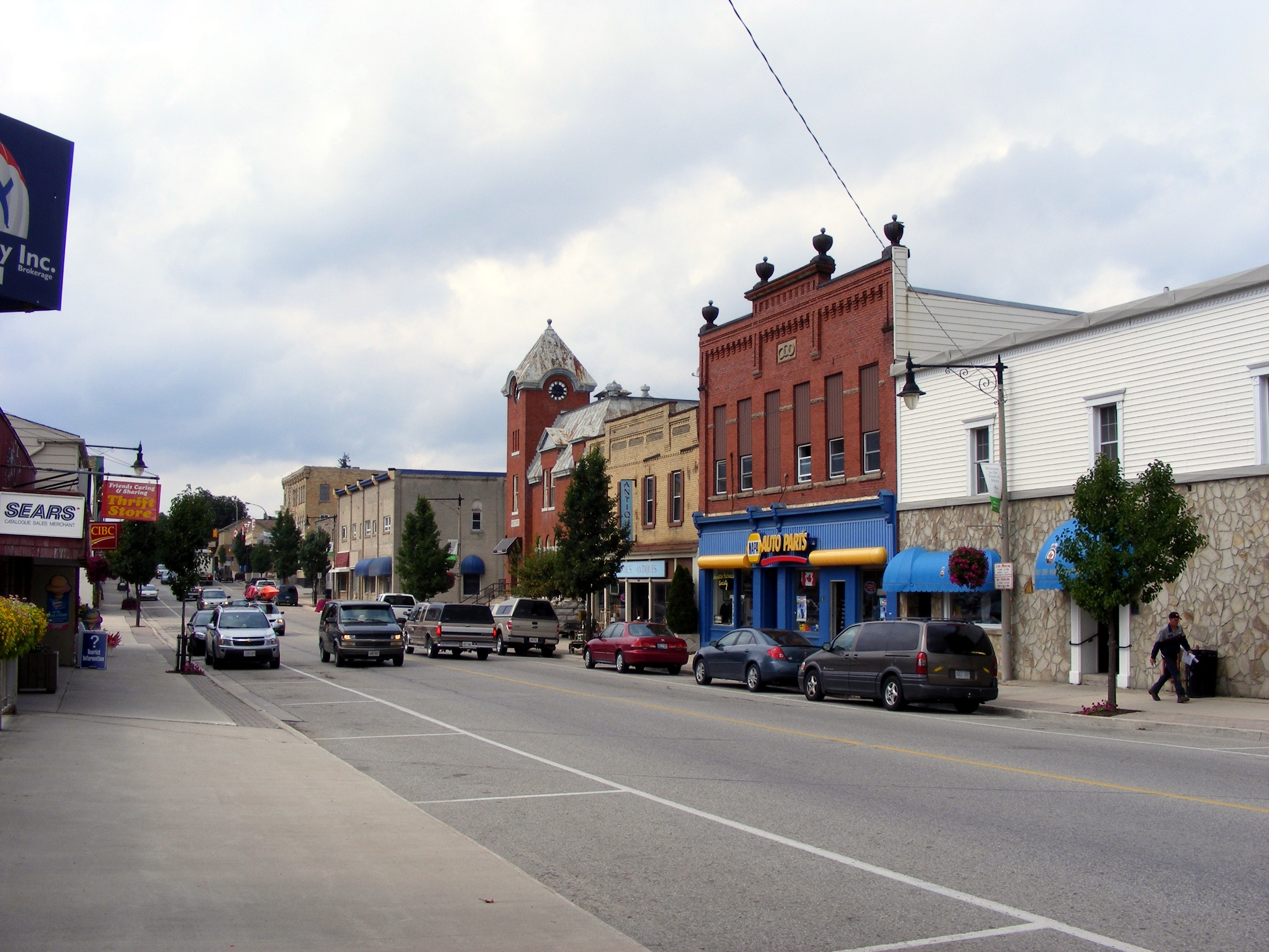
- Main Street, Harriston
- Motto: "Where Your Family Belongs"
- Location within Wellington County Location within Southern Ontario
- Coordinates: 43°55′N 80°52′W
- Country: Canada
- Province: Ontario
- County: Wellington
- Formed: 1999

Government
  - Mayor: Dave Turton
  - Deputy Mayor: Jean Anderson
  - Federal riding: Perth Wellington
  - Prov. riding: Perth—Wellington

Area
  - Land: 300.69 km^{2} (116.10 sq mi)
- Elevation: 334 m (1,096 ft)

Population (2021)
  - Total: 9,300
  - Density: 30.3/km^{2} (78/sq mi)
- Time zone: UTC-5 (EST)
  - Summer (DST): UTC-4 (EDT)
- Postal code: N0G 2P0; N0G 1Z0; N0G 1M0
- Area codes: 519 and 226
- Website: www.town.minto.on.ca

Minto is a town in midwestern Ontario, Canada, on the Maitland River in Wellington County. Minto is the western terminus of Highway 9. It is named for Gilbert Elliot-Murray-Kynynmound, 4th Earl of Minto; 8th Governor General of Canada.

The Town of Minto was formed in 1999 through the amalgamation of the Township of Minto, the Towns of Harriston and Palmerston along with the Village of Clifford.

== Communities ==
In addition to the primary settlement of Palmerston, the town also includes the smaller communities of Clifford, Cotswold, Drew, Fultons, Glenlee, Greenbush, Harriston, Harriston Junction, Minto, Teviotdale and White's Junction. (Note: The rail junction for the intersection of White's Road near the town of Minto. The rail has since been removed by the Ontario Government, leaving a clear path which is known as White's Junction Trail.)

== Demographics ==
Minto, Ontario Historical populations
Year	Pop.	±%
1996	7,854	—
2001	8,164	+3.9%
2006	8,504	+4.2%
2011	8,334	−2.0%
2016	8,671	+4.0%

In the 2021 Census of Population conducted by Statistics Canada, Minto had a population of 9,094 living in 3,417 of its 3,885 total private dwellings, a change of 4.9% from its 2016 population of 8,671. With a land area of 300.19 km^{2} (115.90 sq mi), it had a population density of 30.3/km^{2} (78.5/sq mi) in 2021.

== Sports ==
- Mapleton-Minto 81's SR. AA hockey team playing in the Western Ontario Athletic Association.

== Education ==
Minto's schools are governed by the Upper Grand District School Board.

- Palmerston Public School (grades JK–8) – mascot: Panda
- Minto Clifford Central Public School (grades JK–8) – mascot: Tornado
- Norwell District Secondary School (grades 9–12) – mascot: Varsity Reds

== See also ==
- List of townships in Ontario
- Minto flywheel facility
