= Edwin Tolton =

Canadian politician

Edwin Tolton (22 March 1856 – 11 December 1917) was a farmer, grain merchant and political figure in Ontario, Canada. He represented Wellington North in the House of Commons of Canada from 1900 to 1904 as a Conservative.

He was born in Eramosa Township, Canada West, the son of Henry Tolton and Nancy J. Smith, and was educated in Guelph. In 1870, he married Clara S. Smith. Tolton served on the town council for Clifford, also serving as reeve, and was warden for Wellington County.
