= Palmerston, Ontario =

Palmerston
- Unincorporated community
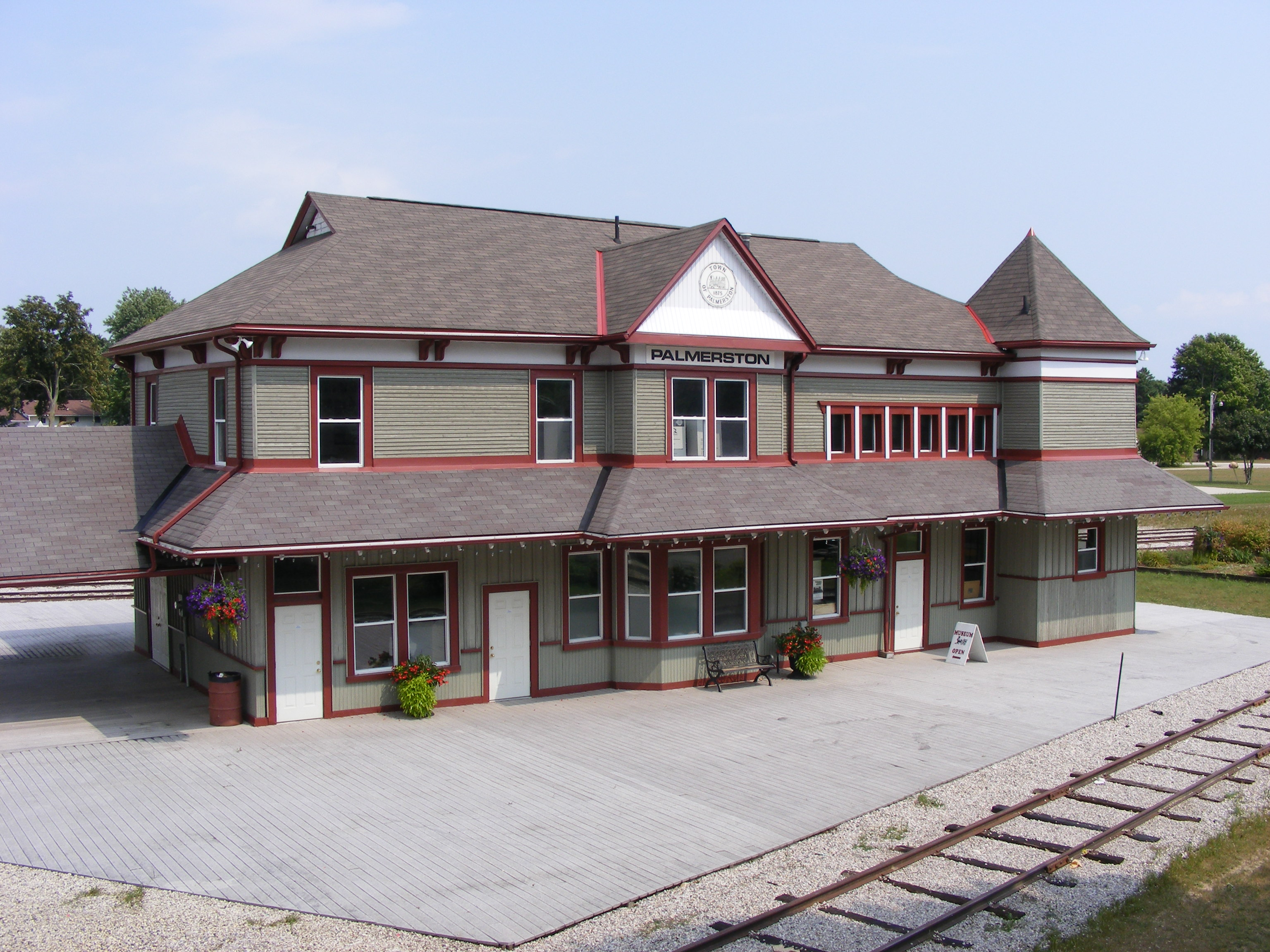
- Former Palmerston train station, now museum

- Location within Wellington County Location within Ontario Location within Canada
- Coordinates: 43°49′59″N 80°50′48″W
- Country: Canada
- Province: Ontario
- County: Wellington County
- Town: Minto
- Established: 1875

Government
  - Governing body: Town of Minto Council

Area^{[1]}
  - Total: 2.90 km^{2} (1.12 sq mi)
- Elevation: 334 m (1,096 ft)

Population (2011)^{[1]}
  - Total: 2,599
  - Density: 868.3/km^{2} (2,249/sq mi)
- 1996 population: 2,468
- Time zone: UTC-5 (EST)
  - Summer (DST): UTC-4 (EDT)
- Forward sortation area: N0G 2P0
- Area codes: 519 and 226
- NTS Map: 040P15
- GNBC Code: FDRCE
- Website: www.town.minto.on.ca

Palmerston (local historical pronunciation: IPA [ˈpʰæ̃.mɝ.s͡tən]) is an unincorporated community with a population of 2,599 on the southern edge of Minto in the northwestern part of Wellington County, Ontario, Canada.

== History ==
Palmerston was a key division point for the Grand Trunk and later the Canadian National Railway in Southwestern Ontario with 65 subdivisions; Owen Sound, Kincardine, Durham, Fergus, Guelph Junction and Stratford. In its original concept the railroad was to run from Guelph to Southampton, Ontario and would not have gone through Palmerston. Listowel needed to be linked to the railroad and it was decided to bend the route toward Listowel. It was also decided that a yard with maintenance shops would be needed. The mainline under Canadian National ownership became part of the Fergus, Owen Sound and Southampton Subdivisions. Passenger service ceased in 1971. The subdivisions were abandoned starting with Fergus to Palmerston August 1983, Harriston Jct. to Port Elgin and Southampton in 1988, Guelph to Fergus 1988, and Palmerston to Harriston 1995. all rail service terminated in 1996 with CN abandoning the line from Stratford to Harriston.

When the railroad decided to build a junction and maintenance sheds between Guelph, Harriston and Listowel, this also included a station. One of the active supporters of the railroad was John McDermott, Reeve of Wallace and, because of this support, the railways decided to let McDermot name the station. He named it Palmerston in 1870 in honour of Henry John Temple, the third Viscount Palmerston. As soon as the railroad decided where it would build, people started buying property around the area for businesses and homes.

Another historic plaque discusses the Ontario Vaccine Farm, opened in 1885 by Dr. Alexander Stewart in order to produce smallpox vaccine. Until about 1907, much of the vaccine used in Ontario was produced here; later, farms in the U.S. took much of the business. Stewart died in 1911 but the farm continued under H.B. Coleman until 1916. Afterwards, the farm closed and program was taken over by the University of Toronto.

In 1995, the Progressive Conservative government of Ontario began to reduce the number of total municipalities in the province. Effective 1 Jan. 1999, The Town of Minto is composed of the former towns of Harriston and Palmerston, the former village of Clifford, and the surrounding rural area of the former Minto Township.

== Demographics ==
Population history of Palmerston
Year	Pop.	±%
1881	1,292	—
1891	2,006	+55.3%
1901	1,850	−7.8%
1911	1,665	−10.0%
1921	1,523	−8.5%
1931	1,543	+1.3%
1941	1,418	−8.1%
1951	1,573	+10.9%
1956	1,550	−1.5%
1961	1,554	+0.3%
1966	1,631	+5.0%
1971	1,855	+13.7%
1976	1,961	+5.7%
1981	1,910	−2.6%
1986	2,063	+8.0%
1991	2,313	+12.1%
1996	2,468	+6.7%
2001	2,518	+2.0%
2006	2,589	+2.8%
2011	2,599	+0.4%
2016	2,624	+1.0%
2021	2,989	+13.9%

As of the 2021 Canadian Census, Palmerston's population was 2,989. This represents an increase of 365 people, or 13.9%, compared to the 2016 Canadian Census.

Palmerston did not appear in the first Canadian census in 1871.

Palmerston's population was 1,292 in 1881, and the total population grew to 2,006 in 1891 before a slight drop to 1,850 in 1901. Palmerston's population would not exceed 2,000 again until 1986.

From 1901 to 1941, Palmerston's population dropped significantly, to a low of 1,418 in 1941.

Following World War II, Palmerston saw their population rise to 1,573 in 1951, their highest total since 1911. Since 1951, the population of Palmerston has nearly doubled.

As of the latest census in 2021, the median age in Palmerston is 39.6 years old. There are 1,185 private dwellings in Palmerston, with 1,184 of them occupied by usual residents.

The median total income for a household in Palmerston was $78,000 in 2020.

== Education ==
=== Upper Grand District School Board ===
Palmerston is served by the Upper Grand District School Board as Palmerston Public School is a K-8 school located on Prospect Street. Norwell District Secondary School, located on Cumberland Street, is the local high school for the community.

=== Wellington Catholic District School Board ===
Palmerston is served by the Wellington Catholic District School Board, as local students K-8 students are bussed to St. John Catholic Elementary School in Arthur. Local high school students in the WCDSB are bussed to Saint James Catholic High School in Guelph.

=== Public library system ===
The Wellington County Library system consists of 14 branches throughout the county, including one in Palmerston on Bell Street.

== Culture ==
=== Norgan Theatre ===
The Norgan Theatre is a small theatre located on Main Street in Palmerston. It was built by the successful businessman George Norgan who had made his fortune in Vancouver, BC. He came home to Palmerston in 1947 and noticed the lack of leisure opportunities in the town. To address this situation, he personally donated $50,000 for the construction of a movie theatre. It opened on August 18, 1947 and was named after him. The Norgan Theatre was renovated in 2007. The Norgan is run by volunteers and therefore the price for tickets is fairly inexpensive: $10.00 per adult and $5.00 for those 13 and under.

=== Palmerston Railway Heritage Museum ===
The Palmerston Railway Heritage Museum is the only original station left in Wellington County and one of the few designated as a railway museum in the province.

=== Outdoor attractions ===
- Lions Park Playground: attractions include a fully restored railway bridge, a splash pad, sports pad for basketball and baseball, playground, a tennis court, picnic tables and full-sized pavilion for family gatherings.
- Palmerston & District Community Centre: includes the Barb Wright Pavilion and Playground, ball diamonds and soccer pitches.
- Palmerston Pool & Splash Pad: includes an outdoor swimming pool and splash pad.
- White's Junction Trail: runs along the former Canadian National Railway line north of Palmerston and connects to the Harriston Greenway Trail. The trail is home to one of the most northern sightings of tall Prairie grasses.

=== Festivals ===
- Minto Farmers' Market: open from June until September and located at the Palmerston Railway Heritage Museum, it offers 100% locally grown farm products, baking and artisanal goods.
- Raleway Festival: held annually in June at the Palmerston Railway Heritage Museum. It is a festival that promotes Ontario beer, cocktails, spirits and local food. Also offers outdoor games, live entertainment and handcar rides.
- Minto Fire and Ice Festival: held at the Palmerston Arena in late-December, it includes public skating, music, blacksmithing demonstrations, magic tricks, face painting, a food truck, fire pits and fireworks.
- Light Up the Park: held at Lions Heritage Park in November as the park gets a glow up with colourful Christmas lights along the trails and walkways.
- Kris Kringle Market: held in November in downtown Palmerston includes singing of holiday tunes, food, firepits and late-night shopping.
- Santa Claus Parade: held on the first Saturday in December, the parade is along Main Street in downtown Palmerston. It includes floats, music and an appearance from Santa Claus.

== Fire and Emergency services ==
- Ambulance: Ambulance service in Palmerston is provided by the Guelph-Wellington Paramedic Service. The headquarters for GWPS is located in Guelph and the closest station to Palmerston is located in Harriston.
- Fire services: Residents of Palmerston are served by the Minto Fire Department. The fire department is a volunteer fire service, with approximately 85 volunteer fire fighters. Palmerston has a fire station located within the community, Fire Station 10.
- Police: The Ontario Provincial Police provides service for Palmerston. There isn't an operation centre located within the community. The OPP operation centre that serves Palmerston is the North Wellington Operations Centre located in Teviotdale.

== Health care ==
The Palmerston and District Hospital is located within the community and is a part of the Wellington Health Care Alliance with Groves Memorial Community Hospital in Fergus and Louise Marshall Hospital in Mount Forest. Palmerston is also home to the Minto Rural Health Centre and the Palmerston Medical Centre.

== Media ==
- Print media: local print media coverage in Palmerston is provided by the Wellington Advertiser, which is a local newspaper based out of Fergus.
- Radio: local radio coverage in Palmerston is provided by 88.7 The River (CIWN-FM) from nearby Mount Forest and The Grand 101 FM (CICW-FM), which is based out of Fergus. Stations from Guelph and the Region of Waterloo also provide coverage.
- Television: CTV Kitchener (CKCO-DT) provides local news for Palmerston.

== Transportation ==
Palmerston sits on the southern edge of Minto in the northwestern part of Wellington County, Ontario.

- Air: Palmerston has a heliport at Palmerston District Hospital. The closest major airports to Palmerston are the Region of Waterloo International Airport located in Woolwich. and Toronto Pearson International Airport located in Mississauga.
- Rail: the closest train station to Palmerston is Guelph Central Station in Guelph. At this location, Via Rail along the Quebec City-Windsor Corridor and GO Transit along the Kitchener line is offered.
- RIDE WELL: is an on-demand, publicly-funded, rural transit service offering service that is available in Palmerston, as well as throughout Wellington County and in the city of Guelph.

== Sports ==
=== Palmerston & District Community Centre ===
The Palmerston & District Community Centre features an arena with an ice/floor surface for ice hockey and curling, and an auditorium. The community centre is also home to the Barb Wright Pavilion and Playground, the Palmerston ball diamonds and the Palmerston soccer pitches.

- Auditorium: the auditorium has a capacity of 299 and is used for weddings, family reunions, special occasions, meetings, presentations and select sporting events.
- Arena floor: the arena has a capacity of 1,082 and is used for large functions, banquets, galas and indoor sporting events. The Minto 81's of the Ontario Elite Hockey League play their home games at the arena.
- Curling floor: the curling floor has a capacity of 449 and from October to March, it is used for curling. From April to September, this is a location that is used for concerts, dances or sporting events.

==== Palmerston Curling Club ====
The Palmerston Curling Club was founded in 1903 and in 1978, it moved into its current location at the Palmerston & District Community Centre. The season runs from mid-October to the end of March.

==== Barb Wright Pavilion and Playground ====
The Barb Wright Pavilion and Playground includes soccer pitches, ball diamonds, a playground and a pavilion.

==== Palmerston ball diamonds ====
There are four ball diamonds located at the Palmerston & District Community Centre. The ball diamonds are the Barb Wright Ball Diamond, Back Ball Diamond, New Ball Diamond and Lawrence Park Ball Diamond.

==== Palmerston soccer pitches ====
The Palmerston soccer pitches features a full size soccer pitch, one U10 pitch and one U8 pitch.

=== Palmerston pool and splash pad ===
The Palmerston Pool runs seasonally from June - August. A swim program is offered by the community that offers swimming lessons, as well as public swims, family swims, aquafit and lane swims. Next to the pool is a splash pad, which is in operation from May - September.

== Notable people ==
=== Academics ===
- Robert Fowler (1954 – ), classicist and academic who was the Henry Overton Wills Professor of Greek at the University of Bristol from 1996 – 2017
- Evan M. Whidden (1898 – 1980), Dean of Theology at Acadia University from 1951 – 1967

=== Artists ===
- Victor Child (1897 – 1960), painter, etcher and newspaper illustrator at the Toronto Telegram

=== Athletes ===
- Lorne Ferguson (1930 – 2008), professional ice hockey player of the Boston Bruins, Detroit Red Wings and Chicago Black Hawks of the National Hockey League
- Jim Reid (1957 – ), professional Canadian football player who played with the Hamilton Tiger-Cats and Ottawa Rough Riders of the Canadian Football League
- Mike Schmidt (1961 – ), professional ice hockey player who played at the 1992 Winter Olympics with Germany
- Nick Spaling (1988 – ), professional ice hockey player with the Nashville Predators, Pittsburgh Penguins, Toronto Maple Leafs and San Jose Sharks of the National Hockey League

=== Businesspeople ===
- George Norgan (1885 – 1964), chairman of Labatt Brewing Company from 1958 – 1964

=== Lawyers ===
- Margaret Hyndman (1901 – 1991), lawyer and women's rights advocate who was named to the Order of Canada in 1973

=== Politicians ===
- William Aurelius Clarke (1868 – 1940), member of the House of Commons of Canada from 1911 – 1921
- George Davidson (1850 – 1935), member of the Legislative Assembly of the Northwest Territories from 1888 – 1894
- J. Fred Edwards (1902 – 1978), member of the Legislative Assembly of Ontario from 1945 – 1967
- Marvin Howe (1906 – 1996), member of the House of Commons of Canada from 1953 – 1972
- Matthew Rae (1990 – ), member of the Legislative Assembly of Ontario since 2022.
