= Agricultural cooperative =

Autonomous association of farmers and food producers

An agricultural cooperative, also known as a farmers' co-op, is a producer cooperative in which farmers pool their resources in certain areas of activities.

A broad typology of agricultural cooperatives distinguishes between agricultural service cooperatives, which provide various services to their individually-farming members, agricultural supply cooperatives, which purchase and distribute farm inputs to members, and agricultural production cooperatives in which production resources (land, machinery) are pooled and members farm jointly.

Agricultural production cooperatives include collective farms in former socialist countries, the kibbutzim in Israel, collectively-governed community shared agriculture, Longo Maï cooperatives in Costa Rica, France, and some other countries, CPAs in Cuba, and Nicaraguan production cooperatives. In Southeast Asian developing countries such as Vietnam, agricultural cooperatives remain to play an important role in economic and social activities in rural areas, although they have relied mainly on government subsidies.

Notable examples of agricultural cooperatives include Dairy Farmers Of America, the largest dairy company in the US, Amul, the largest food product marketing organization in India, and Zen-Noh, a federation of agricultural cooperatives that handles 70% of the sales of chemical fertilizers in Japan.

Agricultural cooperatives are owned and democratically controlled by their members. The governance structure can vary between the different types, but in general members elect representatives to a board of directors and contribute to organizational decision making through a democratic voting process. According to the 2021 Cooperative Governance Research Initiative, "Democratic member control is built into the DNA of all cooperatives but how that DNA expresses itself varies substantially."

== Origins and History ==
During the eighteenth and nineteenth centuries in certain areas of Greece, back then, under Ottoman rule, a particular form of cooperative organization was developed. Networks of adjacent rural communities were organized as a local production system designed to produce specific agricultural or craft products which were then destined for international markets. Derived from the Byzantine guilds, they were enabling better control of the production and tax collection by the Ottoman administration.

One of the first cooperatives was the Rochdale Society, formed in 1844 in Rochdale, England. The Society's first enterprise was a retail store, but it very soon also established a corn mill. The first agricultural cooperatives were created also in Europe in the second half of the nineteenth century. They spread later to North America and the other continents. They have become one of the tools of agricultural development in emerging countries. Farmers also cooperated to form mutual farm insurance societies.

Also related are rural credit unions. They were created in the same periods, with the initial purpose of offering farm loans. Some became universal banks such as Crédit Agricole or Rabobank.

== Purpose ==
Cooperatives as a form of business organization are distinct from the more common investor-owned firms (IOFs). Both are organized as corporations, but IOFs pursue profit maximization objectives, whereas cooperatives strive to maximize the benefits they generate for their members (which usually involves zero-profit operation). Agricultural cooperatives are therefore created in situations where farmers cannot obtain essential services from IOFs (because the provision of these services is judged to be unprofitable by the IOFs), or when IOFs provide the services at disadvantageous terms to the farmers (i.e., the services are available, but the profit-motivated prices are too high for the farmers). The former situations are characterized in economic theory as market failure or missing services motive. The latter drive the creation of cooperatives as a competitive yardstick or as a means of allowing farmers to build countervailing market power to oppose the IOFs. The concept of competitive yardstick implies that farmers, faced with an unsatisfactory performance by IOFs, may form a cooperative firm whose purpose is to force the IOFs, through competition, to improve their service to farmers.

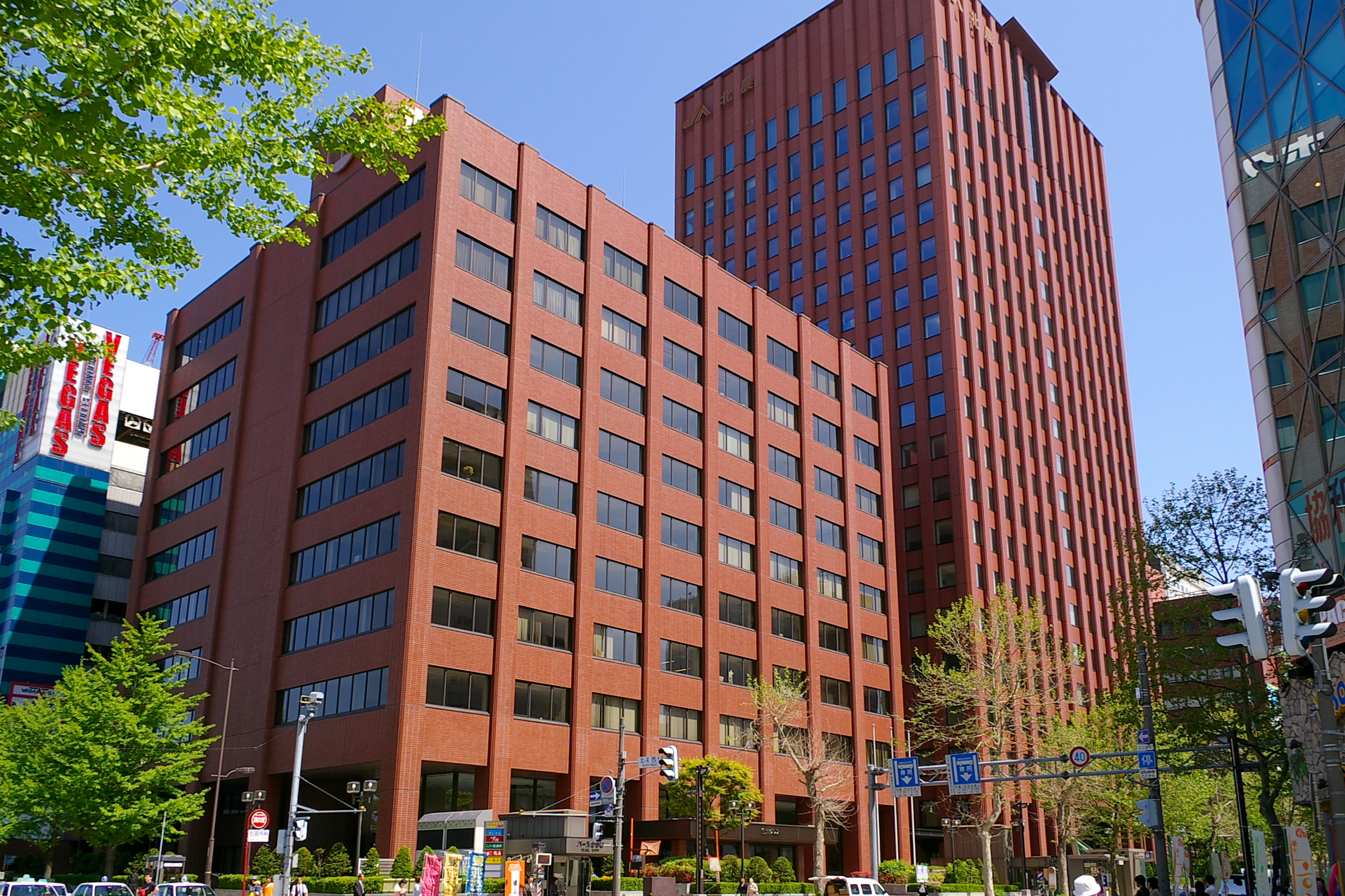
Headquarters of Hokuren Federation of Agricultural Cooperatives in Sapporo, Japan

A practical motivation for the creation of agricultural cooperatives is related to the ability of farmers to pool production and/or resources. In many situations within agriculture, it is simply too expensive for farmers to manufacture products or undertake a service. Cooperatives provide a method for farmers to join in an 'association', through which a group of farmers can acquire a better outcome, typically financial, than by going alone. This approach is aligned to the concept of economies of scale and can also be related as a form of economic synergy, where "two or more agents working together to produce a result not obtainable by any of the agents independently".

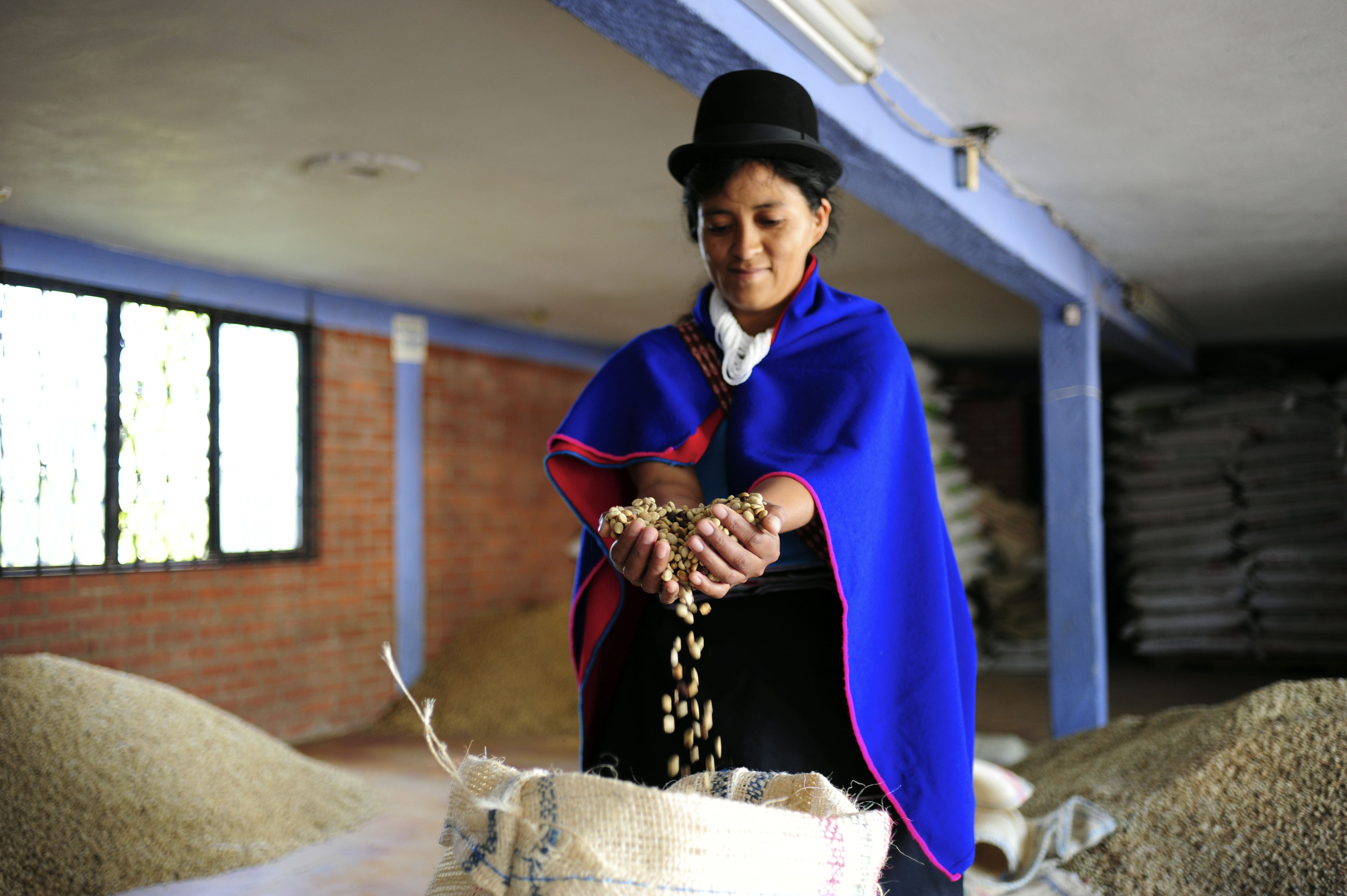
A smallholder coffee farmer in Colombia contributing her coffee to an agricultural cooperative.

While economic benefits are a strong driver for forming cooperatives, they are not the only consideration. Similar economic advantages can also be achieved through other organizational forms, such as IOFs. A key advantage of the cooperative model for farmers is that they retain governance over the association, ensuring that ownership and control remain with the members. This structure means that profit distributions—whether through dividends or patronage rebates—are shared exclusively among farmer-members, rather than external shareholders as in IOFs.

Agricultural cooperatives play a critical role in rural socio-economic development, food security, and poverty alleviation, particularly in regions where agriculture is the main source of employment and income. These cooperatives provide smallholder farmers with access to resources, education, tools, and markets that might otherwise be inaccessible. By organizing into producer cooperatives, farmers can also increase their resilience to economic and environmental shocks. These organizations help build the capacity of smallholders to adapt to challenges in ways that reduce vulnerability and enhance long-term sustainability. Some studies suggest that membership in a producer organization is more strongly correlated with improved farm output or income than other interventions, such as technical training, certification, or credit alone.

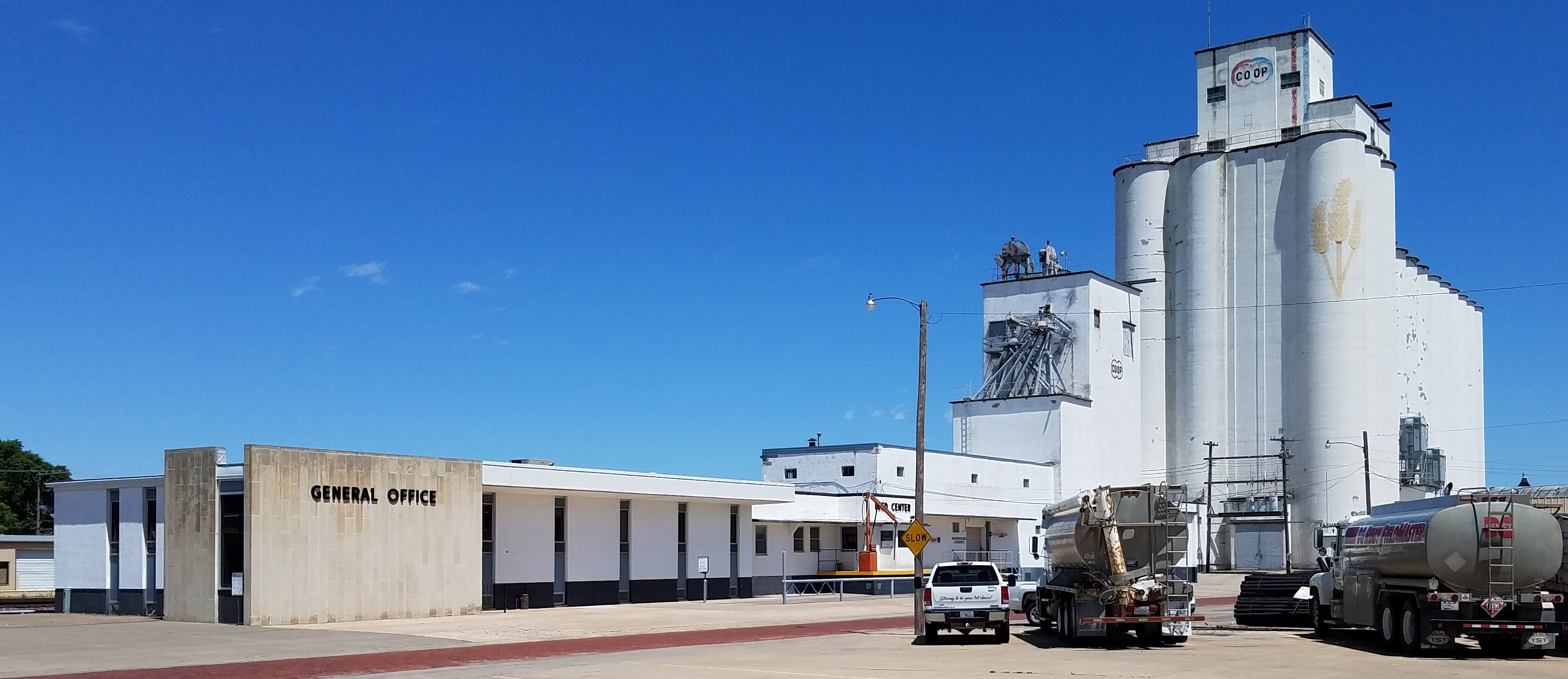
Hays Coop elevator and offices, one of hundreds of grain-oriented agricultural marketing coops in the U.S. Interior Plains

== Types ==
In agriculture, there are broadly three types of cooperatives: a manufacturing/marketing cooperative, a purchasing/supply cooperative, and a service cooperative.

=== Manufacturing/Marketing Cooperative ===
Agricultural marketing cooperatives are cooperative businesses owned by farmers, that market, process, package, and distribute members' agricultural products. By pooling production, marketing cooperatives enable farmers to increase bargaining power and participate in markets that would be difficult for individual farmers to enter. Marketing cooperatives may also provide value added processing and other services to increase benefits to the members.

=== Purchasing/Supply Cooperative ===
Agricultural supply cooperatives aggregate purchases, storage, and distribution of farm inputs for their members. By taking advantage of volume discounts and utilizing other economies of scale, supply cooperatives bring down the cost of the inputs that the members purchase from the cooperative compared with direct purchases from commercial suppliers. Supply cooperatives provide inputs required for agricultural production, including seeds, fertilizers, chemicals, fuel, and farm machinery. Some supply cooperatives operate machinery pools that provide mechanical field services (e.g., plowing, harvesting) to their members. By taking advantage of volume discounts and utilizing other economies of scale, supply cooperatives bring down the cost of the inputs that the members purchase from the cooperative compared with direct purchases from commercial suppliers.

Machinery Pool: A family farm may be too small to justify the purchase of expensive farm machinery, which may be only used irregularly, say, only during harvest; instead, local farmers may get together to form a machinery pool that purchases the necessary equipment for all the members to use jointly. Machinery pools are regarded as a type of specialized purchasing/supply cooperative.

=== Service Cooperatives ===
Agricultural service cooperatives provide members with services that support agricultural production. These services might include product transportation, storage, credit, electricity, technical assistance, and veterinary care. Similar to supply cooperatives, service cooperatives pool members’ resources to improve access to affordable, reliable, and high-quality services that individual producers may not be able to afford on their own.

Credit Union: Agricultural credit unions are service cooperatives that provide members with access to savings, loans, and other financial services. Farmers, especially in developing countries, can be charged relatively high interest rates by commercial banks, or credit may not even be available for farmers to access. To provide a source of credit, farmers can group together funds that can be loaned out to members. Alternatively, the credit union can raise loans at better rates from commercial banks due to the cooperative having a larger associative size than an individual farmer. In some instances, manufacturing/marketing cooperatives may have credit unions as part of their broader business. Such an approach allows farmers to have a more direct access to critical farm inputs, such as seeds and implements.

== Governance ==
Agricultural cooperatives are governed by their farmer members through a democratically elected board of directors. The board establishes the cooperative's strategic direction and oversees the hired management. Hired management is responsible for the day to day operations. Depending on the structure of the organization, agricultural cooperatives may be centralized, with individuals being direct members; federated, with local cooperatives serving as members of a regional or national cooperative; or mixed, combining both individual producers and cooperatives as members.

== Agricultural Supply Cooperatives by Country ==
=== Examples ===
==== Australia ====
- Co-operative Bulk Handling Limited
- Westralian Farmers Co-operative Limited

==== Canada ====
- Farmers' Storehouse Company
- United Farmers of Alberta
- Farmers of North America

==== France ====
- Agrial (Normandy)
- Terrena (Pays de la Loire)
- Vivescia

==== Israel ====
- Granot central cooperative

==== Japan ====
- Japan Agricultural Cooperatives

==== Korea (South) ====
- National Agricultural Cooperative Federation

==== Turkey ====
- The Agricultural Credit Cooperatives of Turkey

==== Ukraine ====
- Ukrainian cooperative movement

==== United States ====
Agricultural supply cooperatives have historically played a very important role in American agricultural history. Supply cooperatives allow farmers to collectively purchase inputs such as seed, feed, fertilizer, fuel, livestock, and farm equipment. According to the U.S. Department of Agriculture (USDA), agricultural cooperatives reported a balance sheet of approximately $125.6 billion USD in 2024. Although consolidation within the agricultural sector has reduced the number of cooperatives in recent years, supply cooperatives continue to provide access to quality and accessible agricultural inputs for producers. Current examples include Grange Cooperative, founded in Oregon in 1939, and Southern States Cooperative, founded in Virginia in 1923. Both cooperatives help farmers obtain quality seed, and other agricultural inputs catered to the needs of farmers in their respective regions. Some examples of supply cooperatives include:

- Landisville Produce Co-op, established 1914
- Rockingham Cooperative, established in 1921
- MFA Incorporated
- Darigold
- Organic Valley
- National Council of Farmer Cooperatives
- Farmers Cooperative Association, Inc.; Frederick, Maryland
- Ocean Spray (cooperative)
- Land O'Lakes
- Michigan Sugar
- Sunkist
- Wilco stores (Oregon)
- Grange Cooperative
- Saline Valley Farm Cooperative, established 1931

==== Netherlands ====
- Avebe
- Agrico
- Agrifirm

== Agricultural Marketing Cooperatives by Country ==
=== New Zealand ===
New Zealand has a strong history of agricultural cooperatives, dating back to the late 19th century. The first was the small Otago Peninsula Co-operative Cheese Factory Co. Ltd, started in 1871 at Highcliff on the Otago Peninsula. With active support by the New Zealand government, and small cooperatives being suitable in isolated areas, cooperatives quickly began to dominate the industry. By 1905, dairy cooperatives were the main organisational structure in the industry. In the 1920s–'30s, there were around 500 co-operative dairy companies compared to less than 70 that were privately owned.

However, after World War II, with the advent of improved transportation, processing technologies and energy systems, a trend to merge dairy cooperatives occurred. By the late 1990s, there were two major cooperatives: the Waikato-based New Zealand Dairy Group and the Taranaki-based Kiwi Co-operative Dairies. In 2001 these two cooperatives, together with the New Zealand Dairy Board, merged to form Fonterra. This mega-merger was supported by the New Zealand Government as part of broader dairy industry deregulation, which allowed other companies to directly export dairy products. Two smaller cooperatives did not join Fonterra, preferring to remain independent – the Morrinsville-based Tatua Dairy Company and Westland Milk Products on the West Coast of the South Island.

The other main agricultural co-operatives in New Zealand are in the meat and fertiliser industries. The meat industry, which has struggled at times, has proposed various mergers similar to the creation of Fonterra; however, these have failed to gain the necessary member support.

=== Canada ===
In Canada, the most important cooperatives of this kind were the wheat pools. These farmer-owned cooperatives bought and transported grain throughout Western Canada. They replaced the earlier privately and often foreign-owned grain buyers and came to dominate the market in the post-war period. By the 1990s, most had demutualized (privatized), and several mergers occurred. Now all the former wheat pools are part of the Viterra corporation.

Former wheat pools include:

- Alberta Wheat Pool
- Manitoba Pool Elevators
- Saskatchewan Wheat Pool
- United Grain Growers

Other agricultural marketing cooperatives in Canada include:

- Organic Meadow Cooperative (organic dairy)
- Gay Lea Foods Co-operative Limited (dairy)
- Agropur

=== Ecuador ===
The Amazon region of Ecuador is known for producing world-renowned cacao beans. In the Napo region 850 Kichwa families have come together with help from American biologist, Judy Logback, to form an agricultural marketing cooperatives, Kallari Association. This cooperative has helped increase benefits for the families involved as well as to protect and defend their Kichwa culture and the Amazon rainforest.

=== India ===
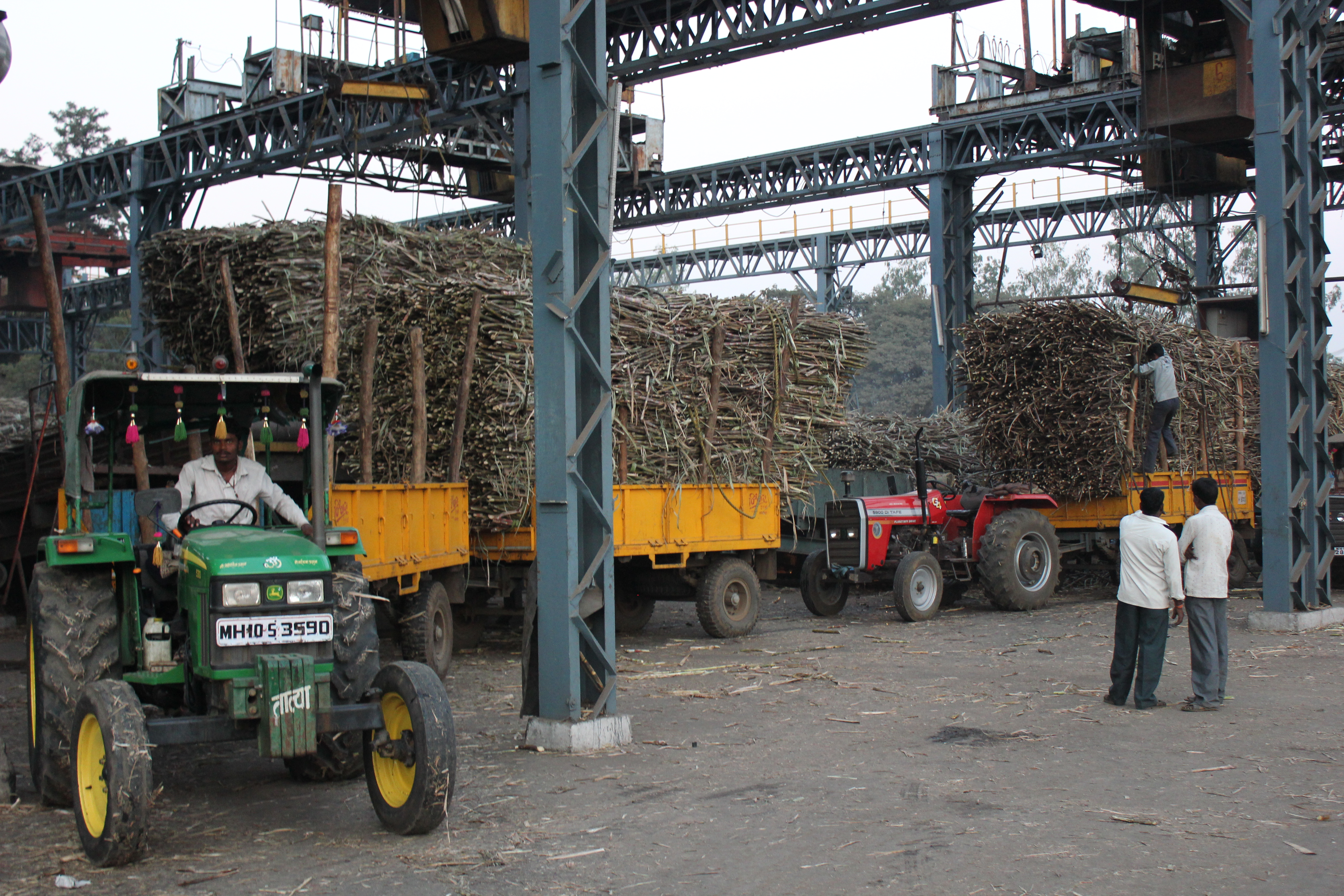
Sugarcane weighing at a cooperative sugar mill in Maharashtra, India

In India, there are networks of cooperatives at the local, regional, state and national levels that assist in agricultural marketing. The commodities that are mostly handled are food grains, jute, cotton, sugar, milk and nuts.

Dairy farming based on the Anand Pattern, with a single marketing cooperative, is India's largest self-sustaining industry and its largest rural employment provider. Successful implementation of the Anand model has made India the world's largest milk producer. Small-scale farmers with a few heads of milch cattle deposit milk into the village union's collection points twice daily, and the milk is then processed at district unions. After this, it is marketed by the state cooperative federation nationally under the Amul brand name, India's largest food brand. Under this model, three-fourths of the price paid by the primarily urban consumers goes into the hands of millions of small dairy farmers.

Production of sugar from sugarcane mostly takes place at cooperative sugar cane mills owned by local farmers. The shareholders include all farmers, small and large, supplying sugarcane to the mill. Over the last sixty years, the local sugar mills have played a crucial part in encouraging rural political participation and as a stepping stone for aspiring politicians. This is particularly true in the state of Maharashtra where a large number of politicians belonging to the Congress party or NCP had ties to sugar cooperatives from their respective local areas. Mismanagement and manipulation of the cooperative principles have made a number of these operations inefficient.

=== Israel ===
- Tnuva Central Cooperative for the Marketing of Agricultural Produce in Israel Ltd.

=== Netherlands ===
- Coöperatieve Nederlandse Bloembollencentrale (CNB)
- Coforta
- Royal Cosun
- ZON
- FloraHolland
- FrieslandCampina

=== United States ===
By pooling production, marketing cooperatives allow farmers to market their products collectively, access transportation infrastructure, storage and participate in larger markets that would be inaccessible if they were selling individually. To meet the needs of their members, marketing cooperatives often provide additional services including processing, packaging, logistics, quality control, and market research. According to the USDA, there were 830 marketing cooperatives operating in the United States in 2024.

Dairy cooperatives are one of the most significant agricultural marketing cooperatives in the United States. These cooperatives market milk on behalf of their members, operate processing facilities, and help farmers manage price fluctuations in the dairy industry. According to the USDA, dairy cooperatives marketed approximately 167 billion pounds of milk in 2017, representing 77.8 percent of all milk marketed in the by the nation's farmers. Some examples of marketing cooperatives include:

- American Legend Cooperative (mink fur) "Blackglama" brand
- Blue Diamond Growers (almonds)
- Cabot Creamery (dairy)
- Darigold
- Diamond of California (nuts), formerly a cooperative
- Dairylea Cooperative Inc. (Dairy), formerly Dairymen's League
- Dairy Farmers of America
- Edible Garden
- Florida's Natural Growers (citrus fruit)
- Humboldt Creamery (dairy), formerly a cooperative
- Land O'Lakes (dairy and farm supply)
- Maine's Own Organic Milk Company (dairy)
- Michigan Milk Producers Association (dairy)
- Michigan Sugar Company (sugar beets)
- Ocean Spray (cranberries and citrus fruit)
- Organic Valley (organic milk, cheese, eggs, soy, butter, yogurt, snack items)
- Riceland Foods (rice, soybeans, corn and wheat)
- Snokist Growers (pears, apples, cherries)
- Sunkist Growers, Incorporated (citrus fruit)
- Sun-Maid (raisins)
- Sunsweet Growers Incorporated (dried fruit, especially prunes)
- Tillamook County Creamery Association (dairy)
- Lone Star Milk Producers (dairy)
- United Egg Producers
- Welch Foods Inc. (Welch's)

=== Mexico ===
- Zapatista coffee cooperatives

== See also ==
- Seattle Commune in the Soviet Union
- Winemaking cooperative
- Zvi Galor, Israeli expert on cooperatives
