= Robert "Bo" Willis =

American softball player (1907–2007)

Personal information
- Full name: Robert Willis
- Nickname: "Bo"
- Citizenship: American
- Born: February 12, 1917 Seattle, Washington
- Died: February 24, 2007 (aged 90) Eugene, Oregon
- Education: Gates High School
- Employers: Medo-Lane, Meadow Gold, and Darigold Creameries
- Spouses: Grace Leeds Bowne, 65 years
- Children: 4

Sport
- Sport: Fastpitch softball
- Position: Pitcher
- League: Amateur Softball Association
- Team: Rubenstein Oregonians of Eugene
- Retired: 1994

Robert "Bo" Willis (1917 – 2007) was a renowned fastpitch softball pitcher, and the first player admitted to the Oregon Softball Hall of Fame. A WWII US Navy veteran, he also worked for Darigold Creameries for more than 40 years.

== Personal life and education ==
Bo Willis, the son of Jack and Virginia Willis, was born in Seattle, Washington, on February 12, 1917. He graduated from Gates High School in Gates, Oregon, in 1936.

Willis married Grace Leeds Bowne on August 16, 1941. Their family included their daughter Georgia and sons Ted, Jack and Jim. Bo and Grace had ten grandchildren and twelve great-grandchildren.

Willis served in the United States Navy during World War II. For over 40 years he worked for Medo-Lane, Meadow Gold, and Darigold creameries, and after retiring he worked for Albertsons.

== Career ==
Called "the greatest men's fastpitch pitcher to ever come out of the Northwest," in 1980 Bo Willis was the first player inducted into the Oregon Amateur Softball Association Hall of Fame. He is also honored in the Northwest Hall of Fame for softball. Labeled a "fastpitch wizard", he was "reputed to have a blazing softball pitch that was virtually unhittable." His pitching record included almost 1,600 games, about 300 no-hitters, and at least 12 perfect games.

Willis pitched for more than 40 years, in the most popular era of men's fastpitch softball. His records include multiple games in which he struck out all 21 batters he faced in seven innings. "Bo could have thrown against anybody," according to Hank Mako, a Portland player who competed against Willis. Willis once pitched his team, the "Rubenstein Oregonians of Eugene", to a win over the famed Eddie Feigner's touring team, "The King and His Court".

University of Oregon player and coach Mel Krause recalled while he was in college in Eugene being on Willis' fastpitch softball team:

"I wanted to see the difference," Krause said. "It really helped my baseball. After that (softball experience), when I got up to bat in baseball, it seemed like it took forever for a baseball to get there." Krause said batting against Willis, who was reputed to be able to throw the ball in excess of 100 mph, was one of the most difficult assignments he ever undertook in the sport.
"He had the fastball, the rise, the drop and the changeup," Krause said. "He could just overpower you, and then he'd throw that changeup. He had me so fooled one time I about threw my back out when I corkscrewed into the ground because he threw that change on me."

Karen Meats, another a member of softball halls of fame for the state and region said:

"He pitched until he was 58; he kept coming out of retirement... What was so cool was he'd go out there with that gray hair, and he still had a swagger about him. Those young studs thought he would be a rollover for them. They couldn't touch him."

At a 2006 Lane Community College baseball team fundraising banquet, Bo Willis was greeted with a standing ovation. According Mel Krause, "He had tears in his eyes," and he told Krause, "Mel, I can't believe this." Krause responded, "Bo, you've earned that respect."

Robert "Bo" Willis died in 2007. He was 90 years old.
