= Organic Meadow Cooperative =

Organic Meadow Cooperative is an agricultural cooperative in Ontario. The cooperative originated in 1989 after local farmers sitting around a kitchen table realized that commercialized farming practices were not sustainable for them. They all agreed that it was time to give back to the land and produce food the way that their grandparents had; without any synthetically produced chemicals, pesticides, fungicides and herbicides. With this thought in mind, they created what is now, one of Canada’s most successful farmer's co-operatives.

Organic Meadow began by growing certified organic grains and it wasn't until 1995 that Organic Meadow certified organic milk was produced and sent to customers. By word of mouth alone, the enthusiasm for Canada's first organic milk spread fast. In 1998, several other products such as eggs and frozen vegetables were added to the list of Organic Meadow products available.

There are now more than 65 different certified organic products carrying the Organic Meadow name.

== Retailers ==
- Loblaws
- Real Canadian Super Stores
- Fortinos
- Zehrs
- Whole Foods Market
- A&P
- Ultra Food & Drug
- Metro Stores
- Galleria Superkmarket
- Sobeys
- The Big Carrot
- Independent Health Food Stores
- Longo's

== Distributors ==
- Liberté Natural Foods
