= Grange Cooperative =

Oregon agricultural supply company

Grange Co-op
- Type: Cooperative
- Industry: Agricultural Supply; Retail
- Founded: 1934
- Headquarters: Central Point, Oregon, U.S.
- Number of locations: 8 Retail Stores (2026)
- Products: Rogue Quality Feed; Rogue Fertilizer; Rogue Nature's Harmony Organic Products
- Number of employees: 250 (2020)

Grange Cooperative Supply Association (often referred to as Grange Co-op) is an agricultural supply cooperative based in Oregon's Rogue Valley. It was started in 1934 with a group of 99 farmers from the Rogue Valley who invested $10 each to form a fuel-delivering cooperative in Central Point, Oregon. With a vision for the future, Grange Co-op adapted its business to best meet the needs of its communities. Today, the company offers agricultural supplies, farm products, consumer goods, pet supplies, lawn and garden supplies, apparel, footwear and hardware.

== History ==
Grange Co-op purchased Ashland Mills in 1943, and in 1960, opened a new retail store in Ashland. The first Grange Co-op in Medford was a result of a merger with Jackson County Co-op in the 1960s. Other products offered to the agricultural community include crop protection products like herbicides, insecticides, and fungicides, and rentals of fertilizer spreaders. In 1996, Grange Co-op merged with Josephine County Growers Co-op in Grants Pass (started in 1927). In September, 2005, Grange Co-op acquired the American Feed & Farm Supply store in Klamath Falls.

In 2008, the cooperative added a retail location in White City, and thanks to the support of customers was quickly outgrown. In 2023, after expansive construction, the White City retail location was built and moved to better serve the Upper Rogue community. The increased retail space from 9,500 sq ft to over 22,000 sq ft, as well as increased nursery from 2,800 sq ft to 15,500 sq ft made this location Grange Co-op's second largest retail store and houses the company's new Business Office. The White City store also features the company's first do-it-yourself dog wash station, and a Mellelo coffee bar.

In 2017, Grange Co-op opened its first store in California. The Yuba City location opened in March 2017 and is currently the co-op's largest store. In August 2025, the cooperative further expanded in Northern California, adding a retail location in Redding.

== See also ==
- List of companies based in Oregon
