= Teeswater Creamery =

Canadian dairy business

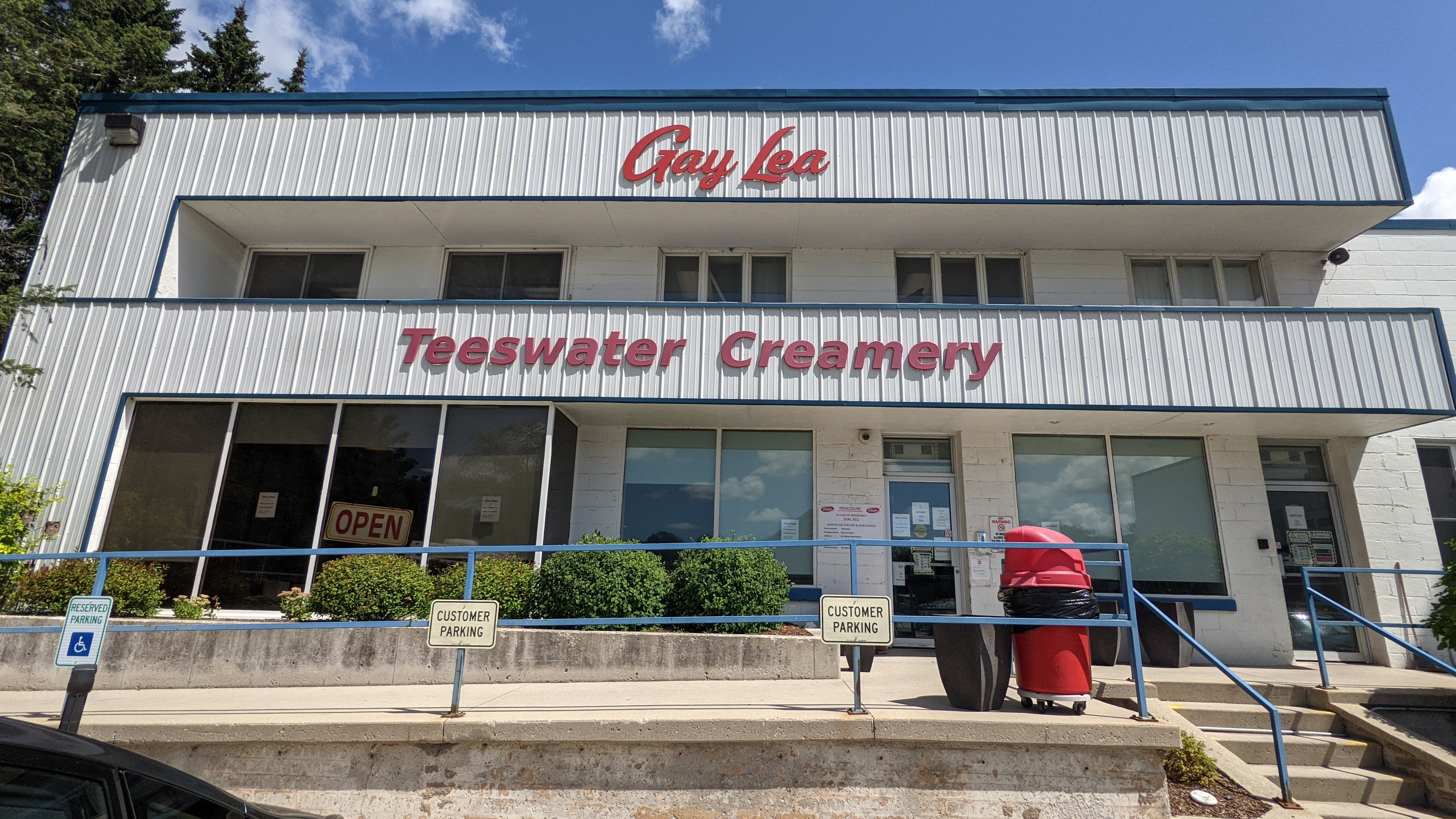
Teeswater Creamery store front

Teeswater Creamery is a dairy business in the town of Teeswater, Ontario, Canada. It is the oldest creamery in Ontario. Since 1981 it has been owned by the Gay Lea Foods Co-operative.

== History ==
Teeswater Creamery established in the 1875 by John Hettle and John Inglis. It was the first established creamery in Ontario, and second in Canada. (Canada's first was established at Athelston, Quebec and was open for just nine days). In 1876, Hettle and Inglis entered samples of their butter in the International Exhibition in the United States, where it was judged well-made and finely flavoured.

Initially, the creamery received milk from 120 cows and produced about 71 pounds of butter daily. It was open from May 10 to November 10 of each year. It was powered by a treadmill that was located on the north side of the factory.

By 1880, Inglis had left, and Hettle was managing the creamery.

In the early 1880s Teeswater Butter Factory, as the company was known at the time, began gathering cream instead of milk. The cream was gathered from patrons in wooden tin-lined tanks mounted on horse-drawn wagons, and measured in pails. Samples taken to measure butterfat content were tested using the inaccurate "oil test". Butter produced at the creamery was stored in 56-lb tubs.

On April 19, 1894 (as reported in the Teeswater News) "The building of the factory for the Culross and Teeswater Butter and Cheese Manufacturing is progressing rapidly. Mr. John Y. Scott is the contractor and he expects to have his work completed by May 1." At this time, the creamery was owned by S.R. Brill's father who later sold it to his son. At some point between 1894 and 1922, it was renamed "Star Creamery" and had ceased making cheese.

In 1922, William and Roy Thompson bought the business and changed the name to "Thompson Bros." Cream was now brought in cans, loaded onto trucks, which were mainly Model T cars stripped of their bodies with racks added to carry over a ton of cream. It was still necessary to use horses in the winter months. For summer refrigeration, large chunks of ice were cut (primarily from the Maitland River in Wingham) and stored.

Pasteurization of cream began in 1922. An 11-horsepower boiler heated the water in the water jacket; then the cream was cooled by placing ice and salt in four 18-inch metal pipes which ran from floor to ceiling in the butter storage room. In 1928, the first cork-insulated storage room was built, cooled by an ammonia compressor.

In 1927, the parents and the remainder of the Thompson family followed Will and Roy to Teeswater and at one time, the partnership included five brothers: Will, Roy, Carman, Earl and Bob.

In 1932, Thompson Bros. purchased the Mildmay Creamery from Ontario Dairies Limited, which at that time was producing about 80,000 lbs of butter annually. At about that time the brothers began expanding their business to include poultry and eggs. The trucks on routes picking up cream, also picked up eggs and poultry. Approximately 10 employees worked at the poultry operation, which was located in the basement of the old reformed Presbyterian Church building in Teeswater.

The egg grading station was located in the former Bank of Hamilton building at Clinton and Union streets. During the war years, eggs were frozen in a form called a melange: cracked eggs were placed in a pail with a stirring device, and the result was frozen in 28 pound pails. The melange was used by commercial bakeries, and some were shipped out of Canada.

Earl Thompson left in 1945, and purchased a creamery in Colbourne. At that time Roy moved to Port Credit. Bob Thompson died suddenly in Mildmay in 1950.

The poultry business was conducted during the fall and winter months until the early 1950s. The egg grading station operated until the early 1970s.

In 1956, the creamery began purchasing whole milk from the producers, and separating at the creamery. The skim milk was made into skim milk powder and the cream was used for butter. The first year, on the peak day, 47,000 lbs of milk were processed through the plant. In 1957 the partnership was dissolved, and Thompson Bros. became Teeswater Creamery, a private corporation with the partners of the old company becoming shareholders in the newly branded company.

Equipment was upgraded at least three times over the years, to accommodate the growing business. In the 1960s, the company spent about $40,000 to build a milk waste treatment plant, and was given the Delaporte Award for environmental responsibility.

In 1972 daily volume was approximately 600,000 pounds of milk, sufficient to produce 50,000 pounds of skim milk powder and 25,000 pounds of butter. Much of the milk brought into the plant in Teeswater was diverted on behalf of the Ontario Milk Marketing Board to markets in Toronto be bottled in dairies or turned into cheese.

In 1977, the Milk Marketing Board and the Ontario Government banned the shipping of milk in cans, and vehicles with stainless steel bulk tanks were put into use. In 1979, a study of the plant's milk waste treatment process was carried out by the Water Research Centre, which was researching methods of treating dairy waste.

In May 1981, the Teeswater Creamery was sold to Gay Lea Foods Co-Operative, Don Thompson, son of William and Mary Thompson, continued as the manager of the business for several years until his retirement.

In 2011, Gay Lea received about $1 million in government funding to upgrade its facilities. In 2016 the plant employs about 100 people.
