= Darigold =

American dairy cooperative

Coordinates: 47.593043°N 122.309199°W

Northwest Dairy Association
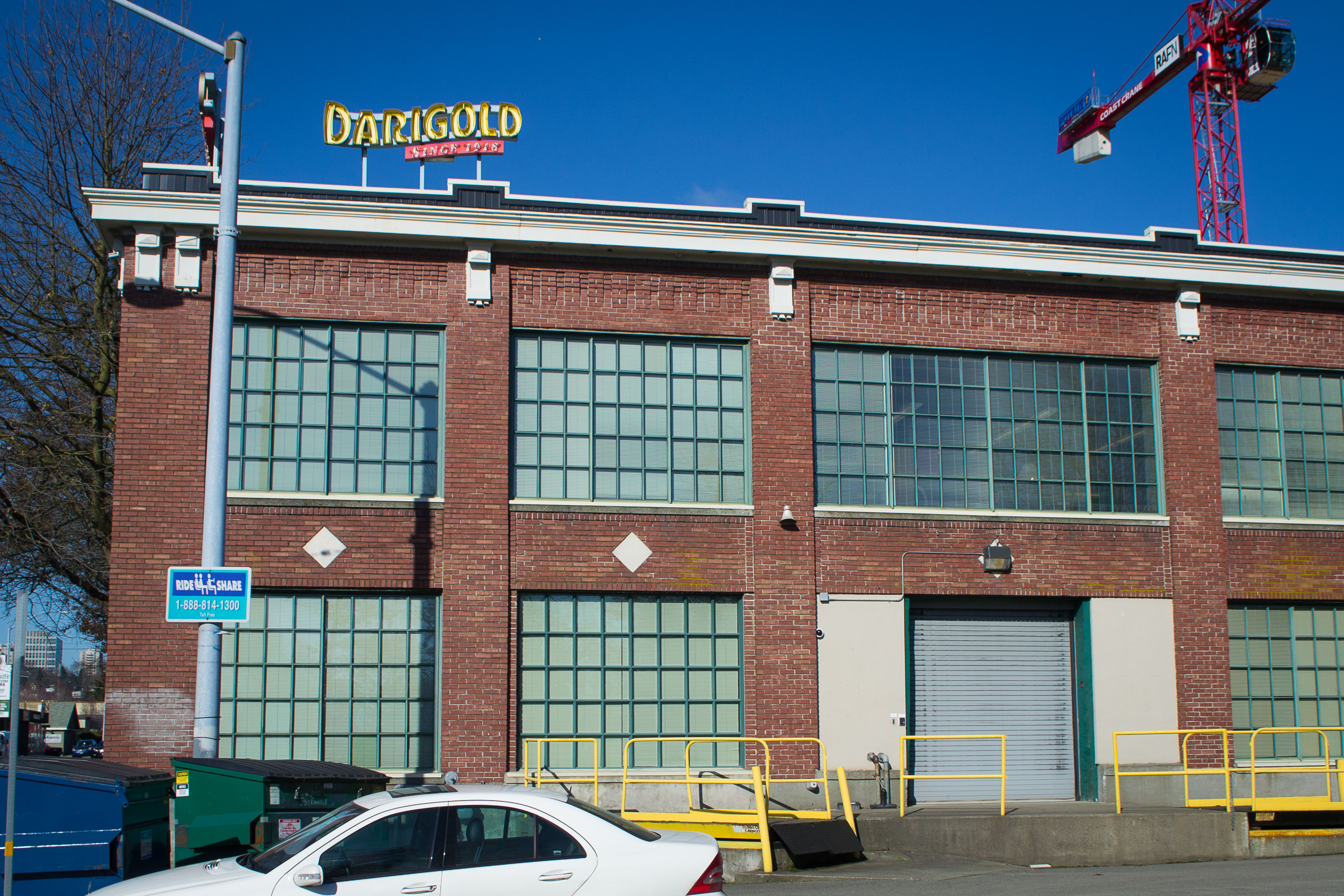
- Darigold corporate offices in Seattle
- Trade name: Darigold, Inc.
- Type: Agricultural cooperative
- Industry: Agriculture, Food & Beverage Manufacturing
- Founded: 1918
- Headquarters: Seattle, Washington, United States
- Number of locations: 12
- Area served: Washington, Oregon, Idaho, California, Montana
- Key people: Amy Humphreys (CEO)
- Products: Butter, Cheese, Sour cream, Cottage cheese, Half and half, Milk, Buttermilk, Powdered milk, Dry whey powder, Soft serve ice cream powder, Coffee creamer, Eggnog (seasonal)
- Revenue: $2.3B (2024)
- Net income: Not Publicly Disclosed
- Number of employees: 1,516
- Parent: Northwest Dairy Association
- Website: darigold.com

Northwest Dairy Association (formerly the Northwest Dairymen's Association; trading as Darigold, Inc.) is an American dairy agricultural marketing cooperative and one of the nation’s largest dairy producers. Darigold produces a full line of dairy products for wholesale, retail, and the foodservice industry, plus additional commodity and commercial ingredients. The company runs 12 production plants throughout the northwestern United States and has satellite offices in Mexico City and Shanghai. Darigold works with more than 250 family farms to meet their ever increasing product demands.

== History ==
In the period between the establishment of Washington’s first creamery in 1880 and the creation of the cooperative that would ultimately become Darigold at the end of World War I, the dairy industry had grown dramatically. By 1909, Washington was the nation’s third largest producer of condensed milk and ranked 13th and 15th in the production of butter and cheese, respectively, outpacing the indigenous demand. This overabundance of milk accorded the creameries with an appreciable advantage over the dairy farmers. Able to adjust the amount of milk they purchased to the shifting needs of their customers and generally dictate the price they paid for the milk from the dairy farmers, the creameries control over the fate of independent dairy farmers impelled some of the farmers by the turn of the century to form dairy cooperatives, such as the UDA (which would later become Darigold), to more effectively market their milk. Furthermore, in 1918, the situation was exacerbated by the continuing growth of the dairy industry and the cyclically of the dairy market.

The predecessor of Darigold Inc., the United Dairymen’s Association of Washington (UDA), was founded in the summer of 1918 in Lynden, Washington, in response to the disruption of the dairy industry in the United States and the terrible plight of dairy farming in the aftermath of World War I. One problem in the dairy industry involved maintaining an equilibrium between supply and demand. Although the cows produced milk at a consistent rate, the dairy market was not as predictable. When demand declined, dairy farmers were often saddled with a surplus milk and nowhere to sell once the market was sated. The dairy farmer’s only option was to wait for demand to increase. Consequently, five dairy cooperatives in the Pacific Northwest banded together to form the UDA.

The UDA, in its effort to serve as a marketing federation for the cooperatives, hired the services of Seattle enterprising food broker Umberto "Bert" Dickey, to develop distant markets in which UDA members could sell their dairy products. He ran the Consolidated Dairy Products Company (CDP) which he founded in Seattle in 1920 and was extremely successful with it. Established as a wholly owned subsidiary, the addition of CDP provided members with a new processing and marketing operation and extended the Darigold trademark to all UDA affiliates.

In 1925, Dickey surveyed all of UDA's affiliated members on what the official brand name for their dairy products should be with and Darigold was the winner. The following year, Dickey registered his use of the Darigold trademark in the United States and six other countries in Europe, North America, and Asia. Regional dairy associations, including one for Whatcom County, bought stock in Dickey’s Consolidated company. In 1930, Dickey sold CDP to the dairy farmers of the UDA. Established as a wholly owned subsidiary, the addition of CDP provided members with a new processing and marketing operation and extended the Darigold trademark to all UDA affiliates.

A year before Dickey sold his company to the UDA, he had constructed a new processing plant and purchased American Creamery and Bradner & Co and Mutual Creamery Company. Prior to the addition of the two creameries and the completion of the plant, a $300,000 building that could manufacture two million pounds of butter a year, CDP was strictly a jobbing concern, purchasing dairy products from other manufacturers and then selling them to retailers. The addition of the processing plant, however, enabled the company, for the first time, to provide distribution, processing, and marketing services to the 12,500 farms that shipped their products to CDP.

During the decade that followed the acquisition of CDP, the UDA expanded its membership and territory in its perpetual drive to give dairy farmers additional markets to sell their milk and dairy products. While creameries still held a decided advantage against the dairy farmers, the expansion during the 1930s bolstered the farmer’s bargaining power. By the beginning of World War II, the UDA represented approximately 40 independent groups of dairy farmers, which included roughly 40,000 small dairy farm members throughout Washington, Oregon, Idaho, and Montana. The development of these ancillary markets would soon be required to support the prodigious increase in dairy production during the war. Washington’s total herd during these years rose to an unprecedented high of 331,000, a record that would stand for decades to follow when the average number of cows ranged between 200,000 and 240,000.

== 1999 to Present ==
In 1999, the cooperative, in an effort to improve its marketing position, changed its name to "Northwest Dairy Association" while changing the corporate name to "WestFarm Foods", but reverted to Darigold in 2006. In 2010, the cooperative merged with the Montana dairy cooperative Country Classic. The co-op's annual sales are over $2.0 billion, and production is over 8,600,000,000 pounds (3.9×10^{9} kg) of milk a year. In August 2003, Darigold locked out their union in one production facility. Workers in that facility continue to be represented by a union, as are employees in most Darigold production facilities.

In June 2021, Darigold announced plans to build a multi-million production facility in Pasco, Washington, that represents significant investment in climate-friendly modernization. The Pasco plant officially began production in 2025.
