= Gay Lea =

Canadian dairy cooperative

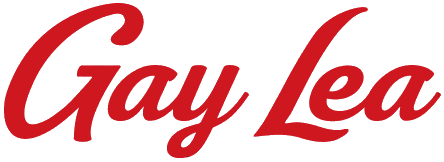
- Type: Private
- Industry: Dairy products distribution
- Founded: 1958
- Headquarters: 10 Carlson Court, Suite 100 Etobicoke, ON M9W 6L2
- Website: https://www.gaylea.com/

Gay Lea Foods Co-operative Limited is a dairy products co-operative in Canada producing butter, sour cream, cottage cheese, whipped cream and lactose free milk for retail, food service, industrial and export markets. The company is based in Mississauga, Ontario and owned and operated by Ontario milk producers.

== History ==
The company was founded in 1958 as United Dairy and Poultry Co-operative Limited and later renamed Gay Lea Foods Co-operative Limited, to reflect the brand name of its products.

In 1981, Gay Lea purchased the 106-year-old Teeswater Creamery. They also acquired Stirling Creamery in 2016.
