= Agrifirm =

Dutch agricultural cooperative

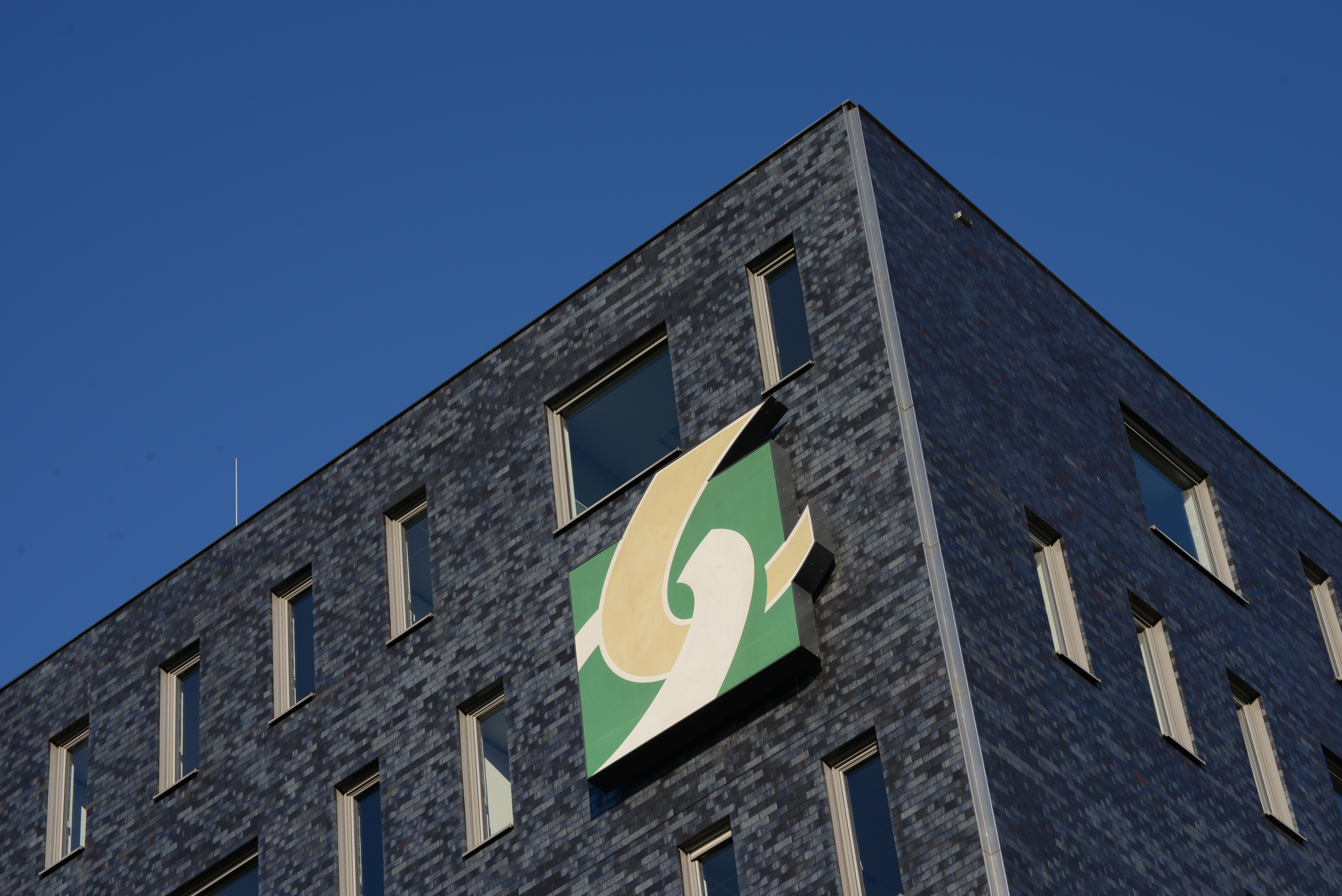
Logo of Agrifirm on an office building in Veghel. The logo depicts two connected links, and was the logo of Cehave Landbouwbelang until the merger in 2010

Agrifirm is a cooperative enterprise in which more than 10.000 Dutch farmers and horticulturalists have combined their purchasing power. Agrifirm in its current form was founded in 2010 due to a successive merger of regional cooperatives. The enterprise operates as a link for farmers being currently active throughout the entire Netherlands. The Coöperative also has business units in Belgium, Germany, France, Spain, Romania, Hungary, Poland, Serbia, Ukraine, Brazil, Uruguay and China. The head office is located in Apeldoorn, Netherlands.

== History ==
=== Agrifirm till 2011 ===
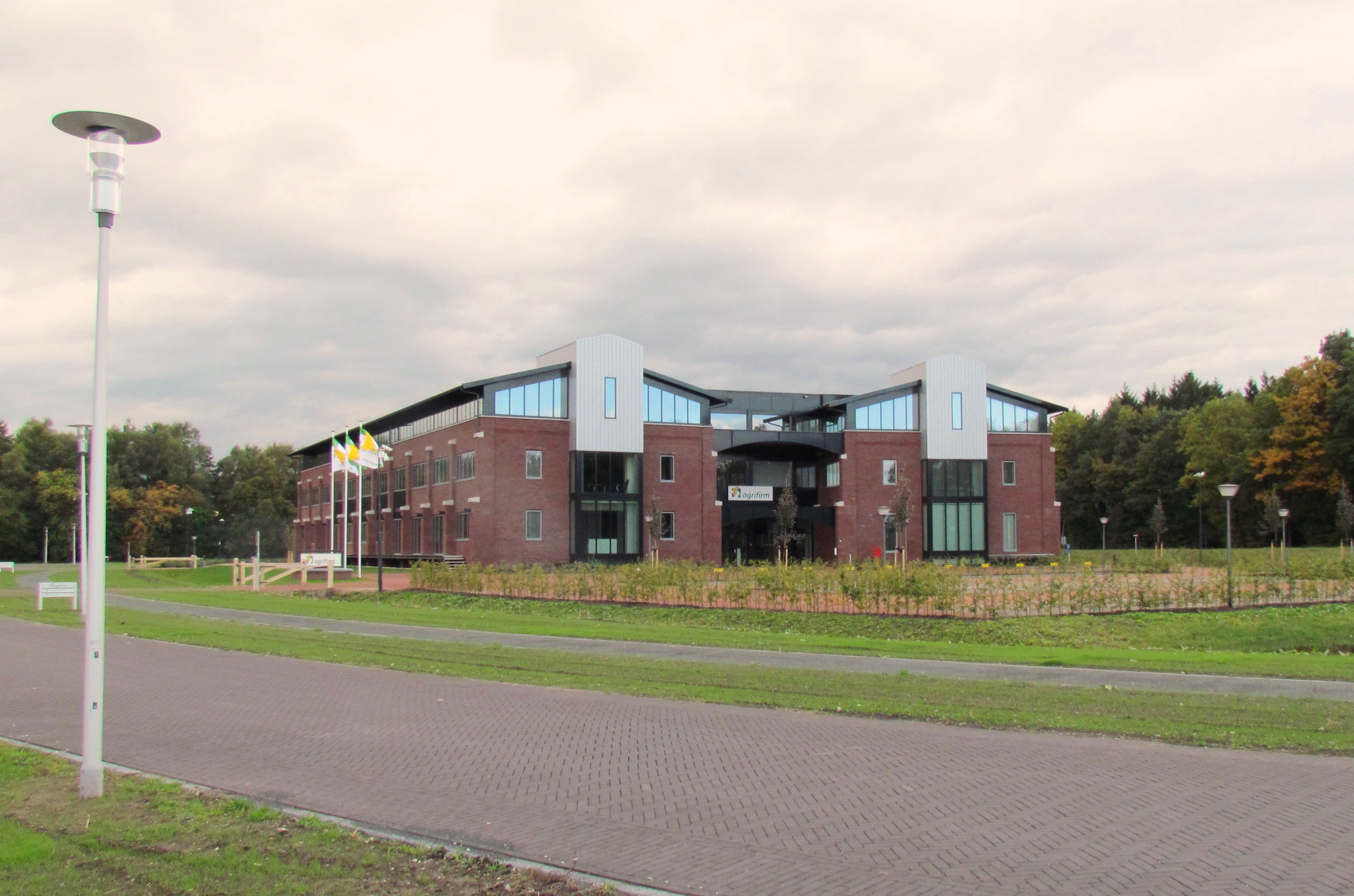
Agrifirm headquarters in Apeldoorn

Agrifirm grew out from the Cooperative Agricultural Bank and Trading Company (Coöperatieve Landbouwersbank en Handelsvereeniging) established on 13 April 1909 with the purpose of taking advantage of joint purchasing and sales of agricultural products and equipment. The office was located in Meppel. Later on, it was expended further with a feed mill, grain silos and fertilizer sheds. Besides, it operated as a bank as well as a plant for artificial insemination.

The original function of the company was expended due to several mergers in the 1960s and 1970s. At that time the name of the company was Cooperative Agricultural Bank Meppel (Coöperatieve Landbouwersbank Meppel - CLM). In the 1980s the bank division became an independent operating unit as Rabobank Meppel and surroundings. In 1990 there was a merger among CLM, Aceco (Groningen) and CAF (Leeuwarden) resulting in the Purchase and Sales Cooperative Meppel (Aan- en verkoop Coöperatie Meppel - ACM). The "old" Agrifirm - which has covered two-thirds of the Netherlands in terms of providing agricultural products and services (excluding Southern Netherlands) - was established due to the merger between ACM and Cavo Latuco (in Utrecht) in 2002. Since 1 June 2010 Agrifirm as it now exists following the merger between the Agrifirm cooperative (in Meppel) and Cehave Landbouwbelang (in Veghel) – the latest had the jurisdiction in Southern Netherlands. The head office is located in Apeldoorn.

=== Cehave Landbouwbelang till 2011 ===
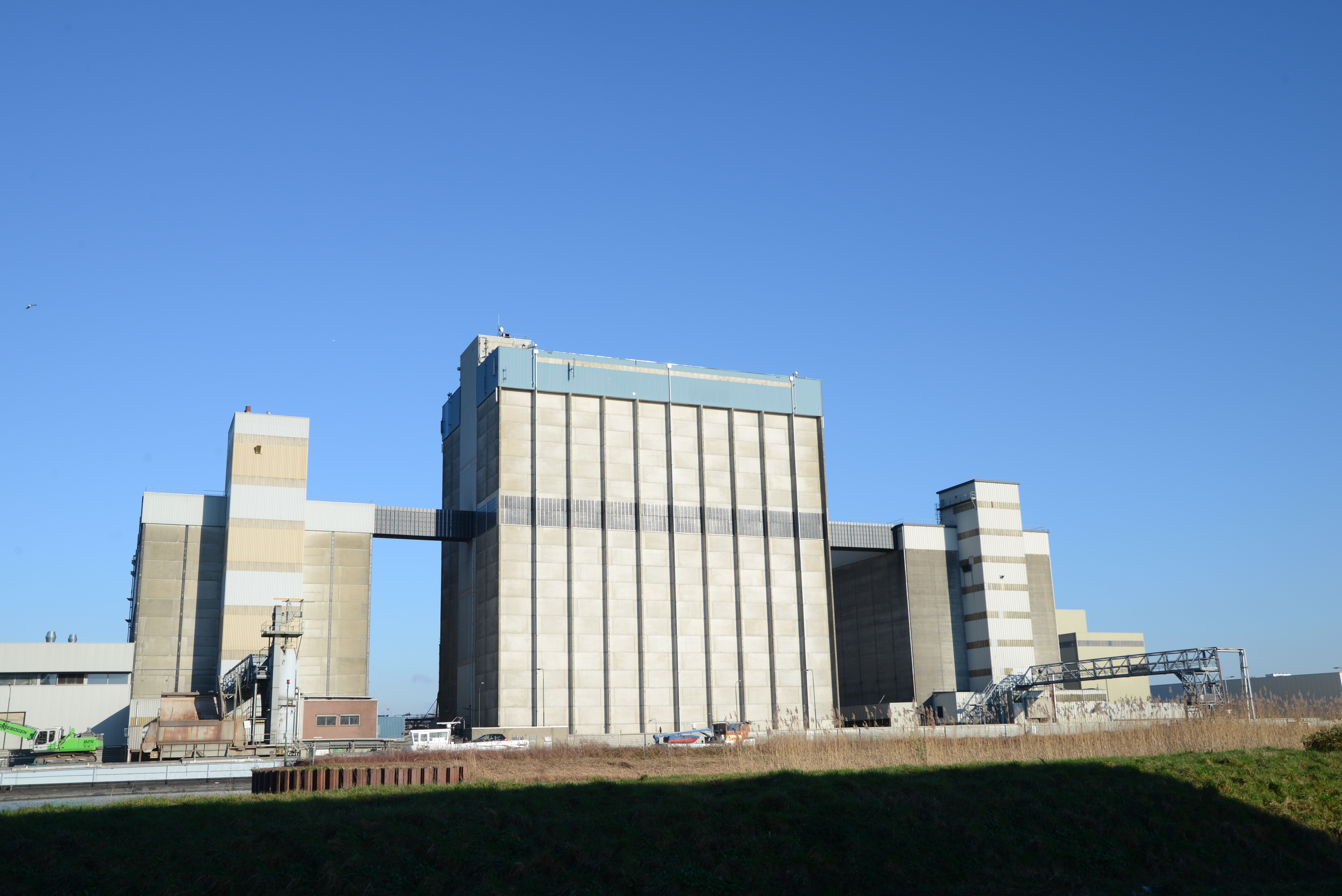
Agrifirm fodder plant in Veghel

The agricultural cooperative organization of Cehave Landbouwbelang (CHV LBB) was formed by the merger of Cehave and Landbouwbelang in 2000. Both companies covered a different region: Cehave was active in North Brabant while Landbouwbelang operated in Limburg. The headquarters of the cooperative organization was located in Veghel.

In 2007 the cooperative had approximately 5300 Dutch members and owned a number of companies mainly active in the field of animal feed production and trade. With 1500 employees Cehave Landbouwbelang operated in the Netherlands, Belgium, Germany, Poland, Hungary and China and was continuously growing further during years. In 2010 CHV LBB merged with Agrifirm and the "new" Agrifirm as it is now was established. However CHV LBB lost its name during the merger, the old logo still exists with the new Agrifirm slogan of "Link to Success".

== Core activities ==
Agrifirm provides products and services in the following areas:

- Arable farming: seeds, fertilizers and pesticides. In addition, being a cooperative, Agrifirm acquires greater strength in various areas such as the purchase and sales of products.
- Horticulture (bulbs, vegetables and fruit): fertilizers, pesticides and industrial products.
- Livestock
  - Cattle sector: feed for cattle and goats.
  - Poultry sector: feed for broilers, laying hens, etc.
  - Pork sector: feed for piglets, cows and pigs.
- Organic farming
- Services seek to ensure farmers and horticulturalists about the continuity of their business within the current economic and social development.

== Locations ==
The head office is situated in Apeldoorn, Netherlands. Agrifirm operates in several locations including many factories: the plant in Meppel produces poultry feed; in Veghel and Zwolle there are plants which produce pork feed; the plants in Utrecht, Oss and Drachten produce cattle feed while plants located in Maasbracht and Wanssum produce both pork feed and poultry feed (particularly laying hen feed). However, there are also numerous plants outside of the Netherlands located in other European countries namely in Belgium, Germany, France, Spain, Romania, Hungary, Poland, Serbia, Ukraine, Brazil, and Uruguay.

== Welkoop Stores ==
Due to Winkel BV and the participation in Agri Retail, Agrifirm has investments in approximately 60 Welkoop Stores selling agricultural products.
