= James McGill Strachan =

Politician and lawyer in Canada West, Province of Canada

Member of the Legislative Assembly of the Province of Canada for Huron
- In office June 14, 1841 – August 20, 1841
- Monarch: Victoria
- Governor General: Lord Sydenham (1841)
- Preceded by: New position
- Succeeded by: William "Tiger" Dunlop

Toronto City Council
- In office 1842, 1852

Personal details
- Born: July 1, 1808 Cornwall, Upper Canada
- Died: January 22, 1870 (aged 61) Toronto, Ontario
- Citizenship: British subject
- Party: Compact Tory
- Relatives: John Strachan, Anglican Bishop of Toronto (father)
- Profession: Lawyer, British Army officer

Military service
- Allegiance: United Kingdom
- Branch/service: British Army
- Years of service: 1826–1836 (British Army)
- Rank: Captain
- Unit: 68th Regiment of Foot

James McGill Strachan (July 1, 1808 – January 22, 1870) was a lawyer, business and political figure in Canada West (now Ontario), in the Province of Canada.

Stachan was born in Cornwall in Upper Canada in 1808, the oldest son of John Strachan, the first Anglican Bishop of Toronto. He purchased a commission in the British 68th Regiment of Foot and studied at the Royal Military College, Sandhurst. In 1836, he returned to Upper Canada where he began the study of law and was admitted to the bar in 1838. During the Upper Canada Rebellion, he served as military secretary to the Lieutenant Governor of Upper Canada, Sir Francis Bond Head. He joined the law practice of John Hillyard Cameron in Toronto as a partner.

In 1841, in the first general election for the new Legislative Assembly of the Province of Canada, Strachan stood for election to the riding of Huron, located in Huron County on Lake Huron, even though he lived and worked in Toronto, located on Lake Ontario. Strachan was the favoured candidate of both the Family Compact, the oligarchic group which had largely controlled the government of Upper Canada, and the Canada Company, which was the major land owner and developer in the Huron Tract. The opposing candidate, William "Tiger" Dunlop represented the interests of the prosperous local landowners in the Colborne Township of Huron County.

Although a local newspaper confidently asserted that Strachan would be defeated, having "...no more chance, than a stump-tailed ox in fly time," he was declared the winner by the local returning officer, by a majority of 10 votes (159 to 149). Strachan took his seat when the Assembly was summoned in June, 1841. However, Dunlop then lodged a controverted election petition with the Assembly, alleging that unqualified voters had been allowed to vote in the election for Strachan. The matter was assigned to a select committee to investigate, and for the first two months of the session, Strachan participated in the Assembly's proceedings. On August 20, 1841, the committee reported, recommending that Dunlop be awarded the seat due to election irregularities. The Assembly adopted the report and Dunlop replaced Strachan as the member from Huron.

In his short time in the Assembly, Strachan voted in support of the government of the Governor General, Lord Sydenham, and in support of the union of the Canadas.

Strachan also served on the Toronto city council in 1842 and 1852.

Strachan went bankrupt in 1847 after speculating in land and railway companies but had recovered by 1853, when he bought a large tract of land west of Toronto, which occupied his attention for the rest of his life.

He died in Toronto in 1870.
