= Huron (Province of Canada electoral district) =

Province of Canada electoral district

Huron Canada West
Province of Canada electoral district

Defunct pre-Confederation electoral district
- Legislature: Legislative Assembly of the Province of Canada
- District created: 1841
- District abolished: 1867
- First contested: 1841
- Last contested: 1863

Huron was an electoral district of the Legislative Assembly of the Parliament of the Province of Canada, in Canada West (now Ontario). It was created in 1841, upon the establishment of the Province of Canada by the union of Upper Canada and Lower Canada, and was based on Huron County. Huron was represented by one member in the Legislative Assembly. It was abolished in 1867, upon the creation of Canada and the province of Ontario.

== Boundaries ==
Huron electoral district was located on the south-west shore of Lake Huron, Canada West. It was based on Huron County. The town of Goderich was the major centre.

The Union Act, 1840 had merged the two provinces of Upper Canada and Lower Canada into the Province of Canada, with a single Parliament. The separate parliaments of Lower Canada and Upper Canada were abolished. The Union Act provided that the pre-existing electoral boundaries of Upper Canada would continue to be used in the new Parliament, unless altered by the Union Act itself.

Huron County had been an electoral district in the Legislative Assembly of Upper Canada. Its boundaries were not altered by the Union Act, and it therefore continued with the same boundaries in the new Parliament.

Huron County had been set up just six years before the creation of the Province of Canada, by a statute of the Parliament of Upper Canada in 1835:

That the townships of Williams, McGillivray, Stephen, Hay, Stanley, Goderich, Colborne, Hullet, McKillop, Tuckersmith, Hibbert, Logan, Fullarton, Usborne, Biddulph, Blanchard, Downie, Ellice, North Easthope, and South Easthope, do constitute and form the County of Huron in the London District.

The boundaries had been further defined by a statute of Upper Canada in 1840:

That the Township of Ashfield, and such other townships as may hereafter be surveyed, being the first range of Townships lying immediately contiguous to the Northerly Boundary of the said County, be attached to and form part of the County of Huron...

Since the Union Act did not change the boundaries of Huron for the new Parliament, the former boundaries continued to be used.

== Members of the Legislative Assembly ==
Huron was represented by one member in the Legislative Assembly. The following were the members for Huron.

Parliament	Years	Member	Party
1st Parliament; 1841–1844	1841Election overturned	James McGill Strachan (Note: Strachan was originally declared the winner of the seat and participated in the early business of the Assembly, but the election was overturned for irregularities; the other candidate, William "Tiger" Dunlop, was declared the winner of the election and took the seat in the House.)	Unionist; Compact Tory
1st Parliament; 1841–1844	1841–1844	William "Tiger" Dunlop	Unionist; Moderate Tory

== Significant elections ==
The 1841 election to the first Parliament was a controversial one. The two candidates were James McGill Strachan and William "Tiger" Dunlop. Strachan was the preferred candidate of the Canada Company, the land company which owned much of the Huron Tract and was responsible for developing it. Strachan was also the son of Bishop Strachan, one of the leaders of the Family Compact, the oligarchic group which had controlled the government of Upper Canada. Dunlop was a former employee of the Canada Company who had resigned from it in a dispute over his military service during the Upper Canada rebellions. He represented the interests of the prosperous local landowners in Colborne Township.

Strachan was a lawyer who lived and practised in York, while Dunlop was a local resident of the area, living at Gairbraid, near Goderich, and familiar with local conditions from his years of working for the Canada Company. A local newspaper confidently predicted that Strachan would have "...no more chance, than a stump-tailed ox in fly time." Nonetheless, Strachan was declared the winner by the local returning officer.

Strachan took his seat in the Assembly when it convened in June, 1841. He participated in the proceedings of the Assembly for the next two months. However, Dunlop filed a controverted election petition with the Assembly, which appointed a select committee to review the allegations of election irregularities. On August 20, 1841, the committee reported, recommending that Strachan be removed and Dunlop declared the successful candidate. The Assembly adopted the committee report and awarded the seat to Dunlop, who replaced Strachan as member for Huron for the duration of the first Parliament.

== Abolition ==
The district was abolished on July 1, 1867, when the British North America Act, 1867 came into force, creating Canada and splitting the Province of Canada into Quebec and Ontario. It was succeeded by two electoral districts, Huron North and Huron South, in both the House of Commons of Canada and the Legislative Assembly of Ontario.
