= Frederick Widder =

Frederick Widder Esquire
- Died: February 1, 1865 (aged 64); Montreal, Quebec
- Citizenship: British
- Known for: Settlers Provident Savings Bank
- Title: Commissioner, Canada Company
- Term: 1839–1864
- Predecessor: William Allan
- Movement: Family Compact
- Spouse: Elizabeth Jane
- Parent: Charles Ignatius Widder

Canada Company notice of Widder's position

Frederick Widder (1801–1865) was a Canada Company commissioner and son of a Canada Company London director, with family connections to royalty and Anglican figures of influence. His moderate approach and financial innovations for the Canada Company gave him good standing with the pioneers of the Huron Tract and the reformers of Upper Canada. His administrative talents and hard work allowed him to advance past Thomas Mercer Jones and take the lead in the Canada Company.

Widder's home, Lyndhurst, became a social hub of Toronto. His wife, Elizabeth, provided upper-class residents of York with refined entertainments redolent of British aristocratic and middle-class life.

== Bibliography ==
- Allan Wilson. "Widder, Frederick". Dictionary of Canadian Biography Online. University of Toronto.
- Bourinot, John G (1900). Canada Under British Rule 1760-1905. The Project Gutenberg eBook.
- Armstrong, Frederick H (1985). Handbook of Upper Canadian Chronology. Dundurn Press. ISBN 0-919670-92-X.
- Taylor, Martin Brook, ed. (1994). Canadian History: Beginnings to Confederation vol. 1. University of Toronto Press. ISBN 0-8020-5016-6.
- M.Brook Taylor (1994). Canadian History A Readers Guide. University of Toronto Press. ISBN 9780802068262.
