= Saltford, Ontario =

Unincorporated community in Ontario, Canada

Coordinates: 43.754167°N 81.695833°W

Saltford is a small unincorporated community in Ontario, Canada, located at the intersection of Highway 21 and Saltford Road, on the east bank of the Maitland River in the township of Ashfield-Colborne-Wawanosh just east of Goderich. In early 1866, local entrepreneur Samuel Platt discovered the presence of brine while drilling for oil in the community. He subsequently developed a salt extraction business, using an evaporation process. This discovery inspired the development of several salt extraction operations in the immediate area, eventually culminating in the opening of the Sifto Salt mine in nearby Goderich, currently (2007) the third largest salt producer in the world.

Saltford's name has been changed several times throughout its history. In 1834, brothers William and Robert Dunlop named their settlement on the north shore of the Maitland River Gairbraid, after their mother's home in Dunbartonshire, Scotland. The name changed to Bridgend Place, Maitlandville, and finally in 1879, Saltford.

== History Pre 1900 ==
In 1866 Samuel Platt was drilling the northern bank of the Maitland river in search of oil. At a depth of 960 feet he struck one of the most expansive deposits of salt in the world. A sample of the extracted salt brine was tested by an authority of the time, Professor Goessman, who said it was "the most concentrated possible and the purest known."

The discovery of the salt deposits developed the local economy with at least 10 salt extraction and evaporator plants producing salt in 1872.

== The Boom times 1900-1920 ==
Salford was a community of about 250 people in the late 1800s. There were several thriving businesses including:

MacEwan Salt Works

Savage's brick yard

The Crown and Anchor was the first tavern in Colbone Township established in ????.

The Lasham Hotel est.? torn down 1915.

Martin's Hotel

Well's Brewery

A cigar manufacturing plant

Symonds Bros. cooperage (1909)

McIntye's blacksmith shop

Gallagher's harness shop

J.T. Goldthorpe fruit evaporator plant (1909)

Bisset's Creamery that supplied milk to urban communities throughout Ontario

== Sources ==
Orr, Sandra (1993). Huron: Grand Bend to Southampton. Boston Mills Press. pp. 87–88. ISBN 1-55046-059-5.

Scott, James (1966). The Settlement of Huron County. The Ryerson Press, Toronto.

Hazlitt, Shirley (1986). Colborne Connections: 1836-1986. The Corporation of the Township of Colborne. ISBN 0-9692386-0-6.
