= Robert Fleming Gourlay =

British statistician and activist (1778 - 1863)

Robert Fleming Gourlay (March 24, 1778 – August 1, 1863) was a Scottish-Canadian writer, political reform activist, and agriculturalist.

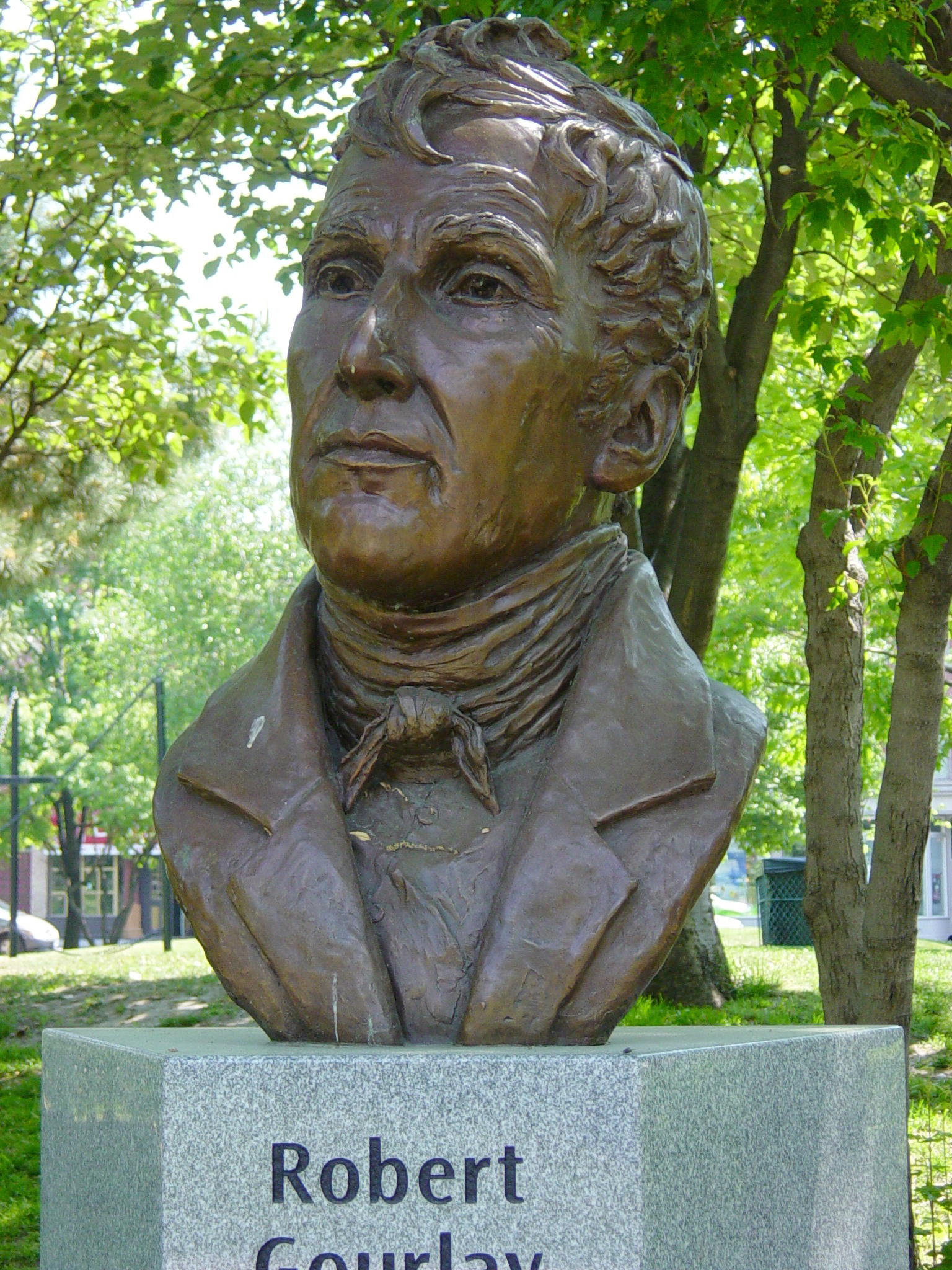
Portrait located in Toronto's St. James Park. The plaque reads: "Robert Gourlay championed reform ahead of his time. In Scotland - a vote for every man who could read and write In England - a living wage for workers In Canada - fair land distribution"

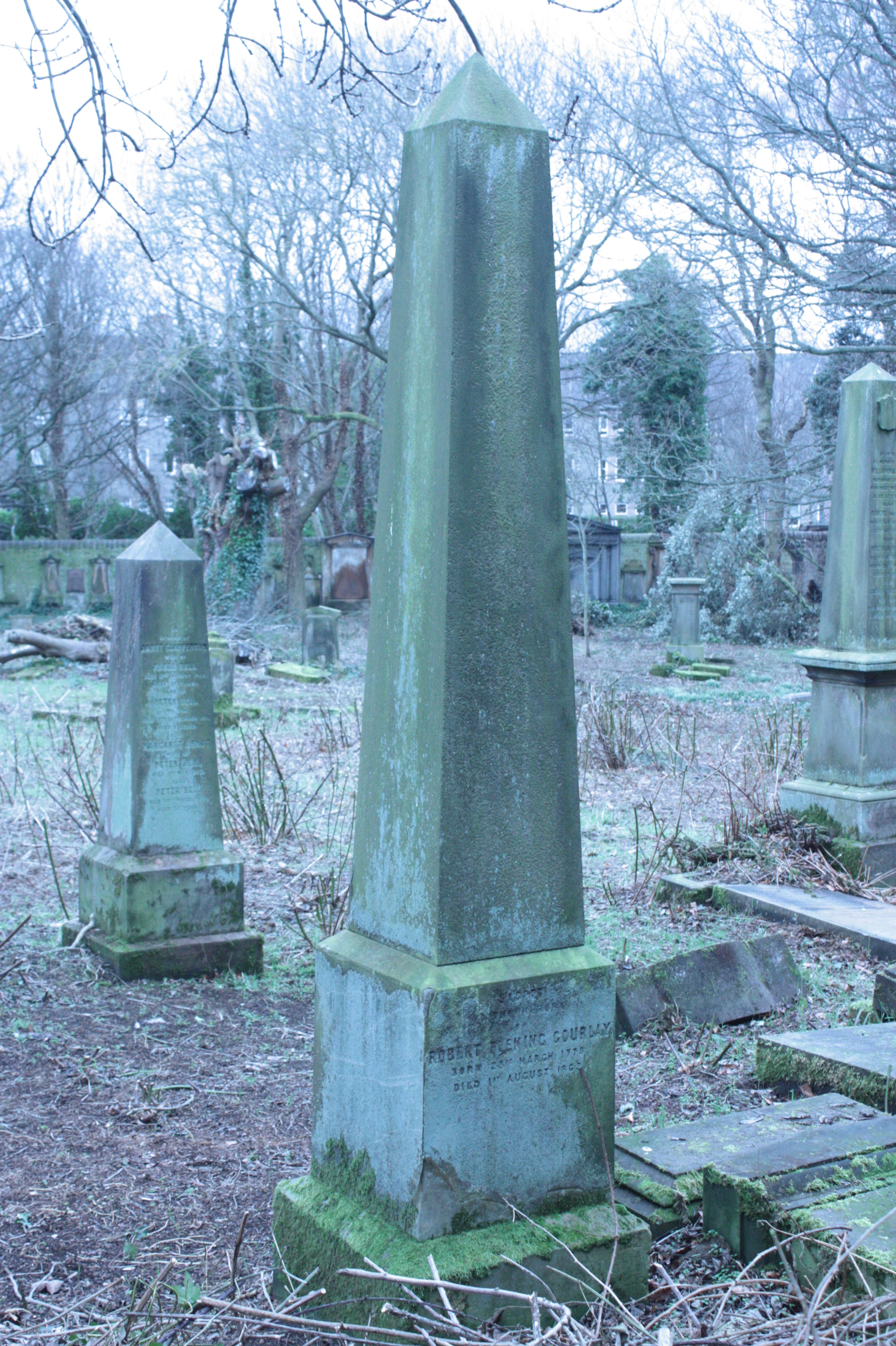
The grave of Robert Fleming Gourlay, Warriston Cemetery, Edinburgh

== Early life and education ==
Gourlay was born in Craigrothie in the Parish of Ceres, Fife, Scotland on 22 March 1778.

He received a Master of Arts degree from the University of St. Andrews and studied agriculture at the University of Edinburgh. He managed one of his father's farms from 1800 to 1809 and leased a farm from the Duke of Somerset from 1809 to 1817. Gourlay's sympathies lay with the poor farmer, who he saw as being imprisoned by landlords and the system of government. In 1801, he was employed by the British imperial government to make inquiries into the condition of the British poor. His report prompted a bill to be introduced into the British House of Commons and adopted, but it was rejected by the House of Lords. In 1809, he published a pamphlet proposing a radical reshaping of the system of government in Britain. He submitted a proposal to the House of Commons that land be acquired and redistributed to the poor. Gourlay adopted the middle name Fleming in honour of his mother who died in 1827.

== Travels to Canada ==
In 1817, his wife inherited some land in the Niagara District of Upper Canada and he travelled there via New York City, expecting to return by the fall. While there, he decided to gather some statistical information on Upper Canada. This list was based on the questions used by Sir John Sinclair in Scotland, the last question being "What, in your opinion, regards the improvement of your township in particular, or the province in general; and what would most contribute to the same?". This last question came to be viewed with great suspicion by the provincial authorities. The list of questions was sent to all townships in the province.

Gourlay later questioned the decision of Lieutenant Governor Francis Gore in banning the granting of land to people of the United States. This ban made it more difficult for landowners in the region to sell their land. Reverend John Strachan, seeing Gourlay as a trouble-maker, attempted to prevent the return of responses to Gourlay's questions from the townships. In May and June 1818, Gourlay began holding meetings across the province, proposing a direct appeal to the government in England. In the eastern part of the province, he encountered much resistance from the ruling elite, members of the Family Compact and was assaulted several times. Gourlay was accused of seditious libel, but was later cleared of these charges. In July 1818, a convention was held at York with representatives from 14 districts; it was decided to present a petition to the new Lieutenant Governor Sir Peregrine Maitland. However, Maitland was able to convince the Legislative Assembly to pass legislation banning seditious meetings and he refused to accept the petition.

In December, Isaac Swayze swore out a complaint against Gourlay under the Sedition Act of 1804, which Gourlay claimed did not apply to British citizens like himself. Gourlay was jailed when he refused to leave the province and wrote articles for the Niagara Spectator. In August 1819 he was found guilty of this charge and banished from the province. It would not be until 1841 that a committee of the Province of Canada chaired by William Tiger Dunlop would hear Gourlay's grievances.

== Return to England and political career ==
He returned to England and published A General Introduction to a Statistical Account of Upper Canada in 1822. In 1836, the sentence of banishment was annulled, and Gourlay's imprisonment was admitted to have been illegal. In 1842 he petitioned the house for compensation and was granted a pension of £50 a year, which he declined, as he claimed to be a creditor of the government. He was also the author of numerous pamphlets.

Although Gourlay had been crushed by the colonial authorities, he had helped bring to the surface some concerns about the administration of Upper Canada. He ran unsuccessfully for a seat in the British Parliament. Although he can be said to have sowed the seeds of discontent that led to the Upper Canada Rebellion, he was loyal to Britain and viewed William Lyon Mackenzie as a traitor. In 1856, he returned to his property in Canada and ran unsuccessfully for a seat in Oxford in Canada West.

== Death ==
He returned to Edinburgh, Scotland, and died there in 1863, remaining convinced of the rectitude of his cause to the end.

He is buried in Warriston Cemetery in the north of the city. The grave is marked by an obelisk and stands on a diagonal path around 100m from the sealed eastern entrance.
