= Angus McIntosh =

Angus McIntosh may refer to:

- Angus McIntosh (footballer) (1884–1945), British footballer
- Angus McIntosh (linguist) (1914–2005), British linguist and academic
