= Canadian Boat-Song =

Anonymously written poem or song

The Canadian Boat-Song is an anonymously written poem or song which first appeared on record in the early 19th century. The question of its authorship has generated a considerable amount of literature.

The poem/song first appeared on record in September 1829, in the Noctes Ambrosianae column of Blackwood's Magazine. It was described as being translated into English from Canadian Gaelic, and to have originated amongst the Scottish-Canadian voyageurs paddling the great birchbark freight canoes from the St Lawrence River out of Montreal and up the Ottawa River to the height-of-land at Grand Portage in the "pays d'en haut" past Lake Superior. Gaelic scholars have investigated and dismissed the claim, however, that the poem/song was in any way derived from Gaelic.

The poem/song was said to have been sent from Upper Canada to a certain "Christopher North", who is considered to have been John Wilson (d. 1854). The authorship of the poem/song is uncertain and several people have been proposed: William "Tiger" Dunlop (d. 1848), John Galt (d. 1839), John Gibson Lockhart (d. 1854), David Macbeth Moir (d. 1851), Walter Scott (d. 1832), and Wilson. The strongest arguments point to Moir; the weakest to Scott.

== See also ==
- Scottish Canadian
- "Mingulay Boat Song"
