= John McGillivray (fur trader) =

Upper Canada fur-trader and politician

John McGillivray (circa 1770 - October 13, 1855) was a Canadian fur trader and political figure in Upper Canada.

He was born at Strathnairn, Inverness-shire, Scotland around 1770. He came to Canada with a distant cousin, William McGillivray, who was a partner in the North West Company, and became a clerk for the company in the Lower English River department. He was transferred to the Athabasca River department in 1801 as a wintering partner and then became the head of the Athabasca department in 1810 where competition with the Hudson's Bay Company was fierce. In August 1816, he was arrested at Fort William by Lord Selkirk, although he claimed he was not involved in the Battle of Seven Oaks. He was not prosecuted and returned to the Rainy Lake region in 1817. In 1818, plagued by rheumatism, he retired and settled near Williamstown.

He was appointed to the Legislative Council of the province in 1839. He also served as a justice of the peace. In 1852, he was recognized as the chief of the McGillivary clan in Scotland.

He died near Williamstown in 1855.
