= Robert Graham Dunlop =

British naval officer and politician in Upper Canada

Member of Parliament, Upper Canada

Member of Parliament for Huron
- In office 1835–1841
- Monarch: Victoria
- Lieutenant Governor: Sir John Colborne (1828–1836); Sir Francis Bond Head (1836–1838); Sir George Arthur (1838–1839); Lord Sydenham (1839–1841)
- Preceded by: New riding
- Succeeded by: Office abolished

Personal details
- Born: Robert Graham Dunlop; October 1, 1790 Greenock, Scotland
- Died: February 28, 1841 (aged 50) Goderich, Ontario
- Resting place: Goderich, Upper Canada
- Citizenship: British subject
- Party: Tory (moderate)
- Spouse: Louisa McColl
- Parent(s): Alexander Dunlop and Janet Graham
- Relatives: William "Tiger" Dunlop (brother)
- Education: University of Glasgow
- Occupation: Royal Navy, Captain

Military service
- Allegiance: United Kingdom
- Branch/service: Royal Navy
- Years of service: 1803–1823
- Battles/wars: Napoleonic Wars

Robert Graham Dunlop (October 1, 1790 – February 28, 1841) was a British naval officer and political figure in Upper Canada.

He was born in Keppoch, Scotland in 1790 and joined the Royal Navy at the age of 13. He became a lieutenant while serving during the Napoleonic Wars; he later reached the rank of captain. He retired from the Navy in 1823 and came to Upper Canada in 1833 with his brother William "Tiger" Dunlop who was a general superintendent for the Canada Company. He was appointed a justice of the peace in the London District in the same year. In 1835, he was elected to the 13th Parliament of Upper Canada for the new riding of Huron. He tended to support the province's administration, including Lieutenant Governor Sir Francis Bond Head and was reelected in 1836. In 1837, he joined the Orange Lodge and became a member of its provincial executive in 1838. He was named a colonel in the Huron militia during the Upper Canada Rebellion, but his unit was not called to serve. He supported the redistribution of the clergy reserves among the Protestant churches and promoting immigration to Upper Canada. He also supported the campaign against slavery in the province.

He died on the family estate near Goderich in 1841.

== Royal Navy Career ==
Robert Graham Dunlop joined the Royal Navy in 1803. In 1810 he took the exam for the rank of Lieutenant. he was promoted to Lieutenant in 1812 and later to Commander in 1822.

=== Napoleonic Wars ===
In 1813, Lieutenant Dunlop, in command of HMS Porcupine, captured or destroyed a number of French craft which had run ashore near Talmont-sur-Gironde. With orders from Captain Trevenen Penrose Coode, Lieutenant Dunlop commanded the boats of HMS Porcupine (1807) in pursuit of a French flotilla. After the French flotilla ran ashore, Dunlop landed with a party of seamen and marines and captured significant French naval assets.

== Political Career in Canada ==
In 1833 Robert Dunlop emigrated to Upper Canada with his brother William "Tiger" Dunlop. The two brothers settled in Goderich, Ontario and shortly after Robert Dunlop was appointed to two offices:

- Justice of the Peace, London District (later the Huron Tract)

As a justice of the peace in Upper Canada, one could be expected to issue warrants, conduct preliminary inquiries, investigate misdemeanours, try a variety of summary offences, and commit the convicted to jail.

- Commissioner of the Court of Requests, London District (later the Huron Tract)

A Court consisting of two or more Justices of the Peace authorized to try any claim not exceeding 40 shillings, Quebec currency. The system of Court of Requests was repealed in 1841, by 4 & 5 Vict., ch. 3, which provided for Division Courts. Regardless of the changes, many of the same people continued in the similar capacities in these positions; Robert Dunlop being of them.

=== Parliamentary Voting Record ===
Robert Dunlop's political career in the assembly was predominantly supportive of the Family Compact, although some of his views and votes were supportive of the Colborne Clique.

- supported the Huron Fishing company,
- supported improvements to Goderich Harbour.
- supported increased immigration.
- supported an extended franchise in Canada Company land grants for War of 1812 veterans and to extend the definition of a United Empire Loyalist.
- supported improved jails .
- supported improved treatment of the insane.
- supported the establishment of a Mechanics' Institute.
- supported a geological survey.
- belonged to the anti-slavery campaign.

== Tombstone ==
Robert Dunlop and his brother "Tiger" Dunlop have a joint tombstone, in Goderich, Ontario.

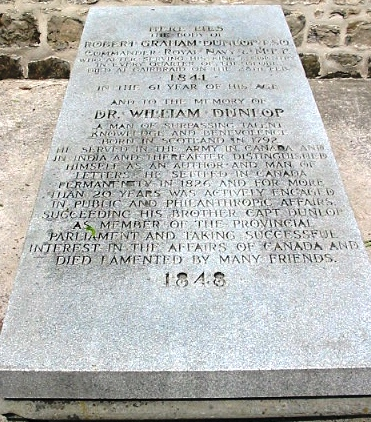
Tombstone for Robert and William Dunlop

== See also ==
- List of cities and towns of Upper Canada
- The Canadas
- Former colonies and territories in Canada
- Timeline of Ontario history
