= David Macbeth Moir =

Scottish physician and writer

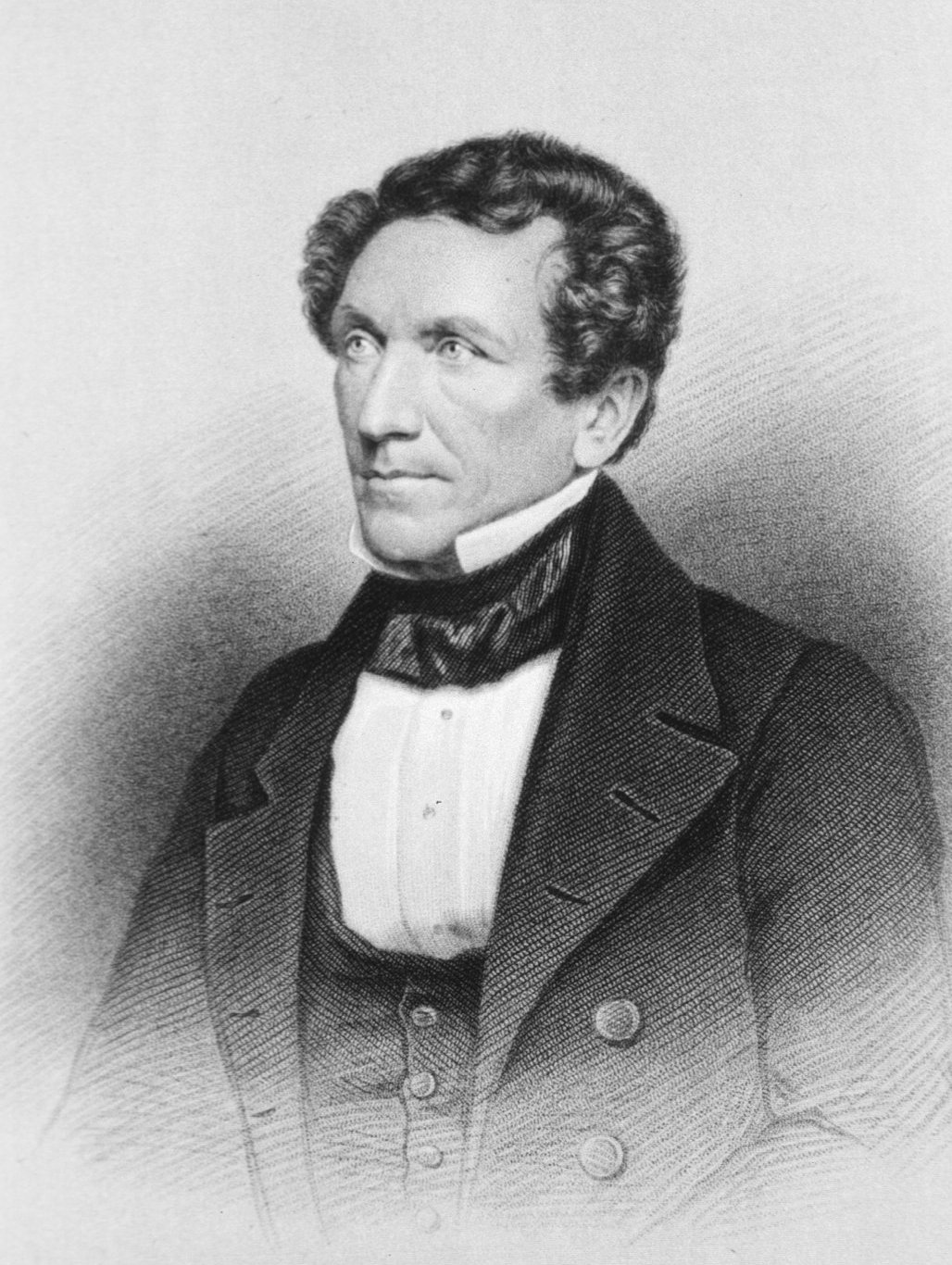
D.M. Moir, engraving by W. Roffe

David Macbeth Moir (5 January 1798 – 6 July 1851) was a Scottish medical doctor and writer.

== Biography ==
Moir was born at Musselburgh on 5 January 1798, the son of Elizabeth Macbeth (1767–1842) and Robert Moir (d. 1842). He was educated at Musselburgh Grammar School. At the age of 13 he was apprenticed to the medical practitioner Dr Stewart, studying with him for four years while also attending classes at the University of Edinburgh, from where he graduated in 1816.

In 1817 he entered into a partnership with Dr Brown, a Musselburgh doctor, practising there until his death. He was a contributor of both prose and verse to the magazines, and particularly, with the signature of Delta, to Blackwood's Magazine. His life is featured in the book, The "Blackwood" Group by Sir George Douglas, Edinburgh: Oliphant, Anderson & Ferrier, 1897. In 1846 he was elected a member of the Harveian Society of Edinburgh.

A collection of his poetry was edited in 1852 by Thomas Aird. Among his publications were the famous Life of Mansie Wauch, Tailor (1828), which shows his gifts as a humorist, Outlines of the Ancient History of Medicine (1831), and Sketch of the Poetical Literature of the Past Half Century (1851).

He is one of several writers who are claimed as the author of the "Canadian Boat-Song".

On 22 June 1851, while away from home, he was seriously injured when dismounting his horse. He died in on 6 July 1851 at Dumfries as a result of his injuries. He was buried on 10 July 1851 at Inveresk Church, Musselburgh.

He is commemorated by a memorial statue, which was erected in Musselburgh in 1853. There are also several street names in the town which make reference to him, and a branch of the pub chain Wetherspoons opened in February 2012 is named The David Macbeth Moir.

== Family ==
In June 1829 he married Catherine Elizabeth Bell at Carham Church, Northumberland, and together they had 11 children. Their daughter Annie Marie Moir married Rev William Milligan and their children included the church historian Oswald Milligan and Rev. George Milligan.
