= William Robertson (Western Quebec and Upper Canada) =

Canadian businessman

William Robertson (ca 1760 – December 3, 1806) was a businessman and political figure in Upper Canada.

He was born at Monymusk, near Aberdeen in Scotland around 1760 and settled in Detroit (then part of Quebec) in 1782. By 1788, he was an important merchant in the fur trade in the area and he was appointed to the district court and land board of the Hesse District of Upper Canada. Robertson resigned from his position as judge because he felt he was not qualified. In July 1792, he was appointed to the Executive Council and Legislative Council of Upper Canada. He resigned both offices in November, possibly because he believed that his business interests kept him too occupied.

He had close business ties to Robert Hamilton, who had married his brother Samuel's widow, Catherine Askin, in 1785. He also held a number of contracts to supply garrisons in Upper Canada. Robertson moved to Montreal in 1797. After the death of his first wife in 1800, he returned to Great Britain and in 1803 married again, but this marriage lasted only a few months.

In 1795, Robertson was part of a partnership with Ebenezer Allen and Charles Whitney of Vermont, Robert Randall of Philadelphia and several other British subjects in Detroit, including Catherine Askin's father, John Askin, which planned to buy the entire lower Michigan peninsula from the United States government.

He died in London, England in 1806. His fortune eventually passed to his only great-grandchild Lucy Harris née Ronalds who lived in Eldon House, London, Ontario.
