= Huron Tract =

Area of land in Ontario, Canada

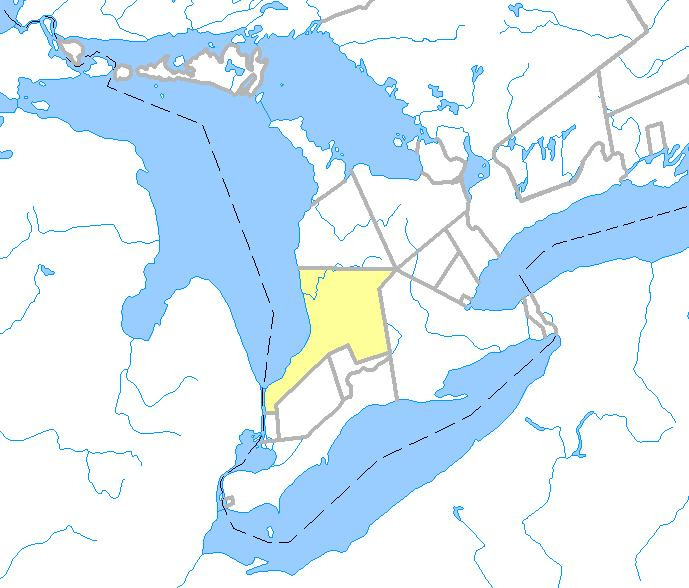
- Huron Tract Purchase area, located in southern Ontario, highlighted in yellow
- Area
  - 1833-1953: 2,756,960 acres (11,157.0 km^{2}) of land
- Population
  - 1833.: 685
  - 1839: 4804
- History
  - Origin: In 1825 in negotiations with the Chippewas of Chenail Ecarte, the Ausable River, and St. Clair River.
  - Created: 1827
  - Abolished: 1835
  - Succeeded by: Surveyed townships transferred to Huron, Middlesex and Kent counties

The Huron Tract Purchase also known as the Huron Block, registered as Crown Treaty Number 29, is a large area of land in southwestern Ontario bordering on Lake Huron to the west and Lake Erie to the east. The area spans the counties of Huron, Perth, Middlesex and present day Lambton County, Ontario in the province of Ontario.

The Chippewas of Chenail Ecarte, the Ausable River, and St. Clair River sold the Huron Tract to the Canada Company, an agent of the British government, to be distributed to colonial settlers of Upper Canada. Influenced by William "Tiger" Dunlop, John Galt and other businessmen formed the Canada Company. The Canada Company bought one million acres (4,000 km^{2}) of land west of the then London district and called it the Huron Tract. The Canada Company was the administrative agent for the Huron Tract.

An Act of Parliament in 1825 incorporated the Canada Company with the Huron Tract settlement objective as its primary goal. The Canada Company received its Charter in 1826, ceased business in 1951 and was dissolved in December 1953. Private enterprise and the ruling elite never quite separated in the case of the Huron Tract, the Canada Company and the Family Compact being almost synonymous until after the Rebellions of 1837.

== Historic origins ==
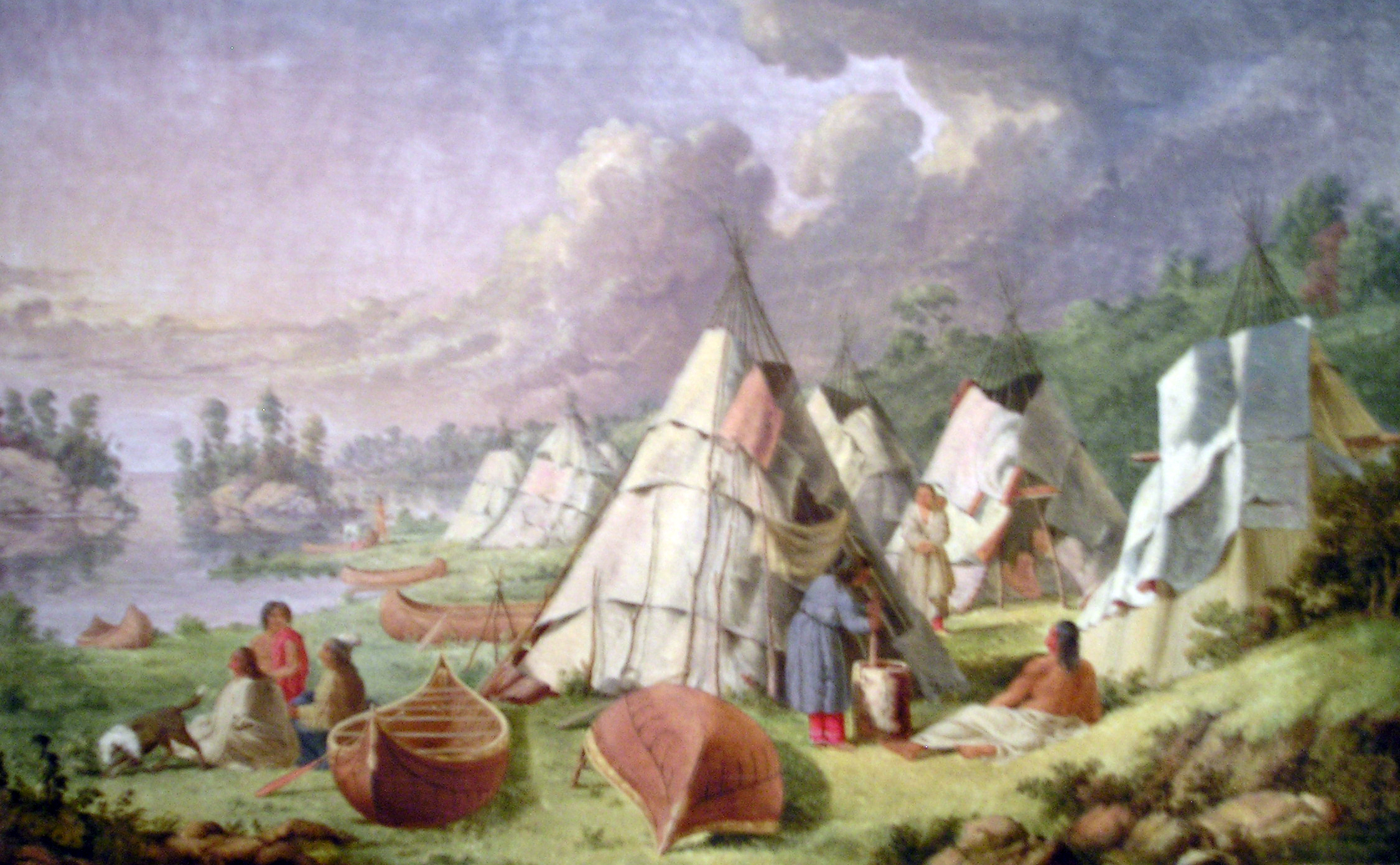
An oil painting by Paul Kane depicting an Ojibwa camp on the shores of Georgian Bay, on Lake Huron entitled Encampment Among The Islands Of Lake Huron

For 5000 years groups of 25 to 250 Huron, Algonquin and the Ojibwa historically used this land as tribal summer homes for communal fishing and hunting. To protect their way of life, the tribes led explorers north along the Nipissing Passageway. The waterways of Magnetawan River were the traditional access routes to Georgian Bay and the Ottawa River. Outside the Long Wood Purchase, the Crown wished also to purchase a larger tract of land known as the Huron Tract. The Chippewas of Chenail Ecarte, the Ausable River, and St. Clair River negotiated with John Askin, then Superintendent of Indian Affairs, for this tract.

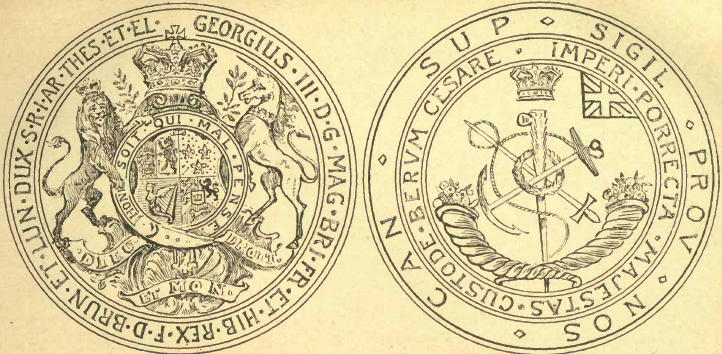
Great Seal of Upper Canada. Used on ratified treaties.

The practice of distribution of Upper Canada land through government agencies began with John Graves Simcoe, first Lieutenant Governor of Upper Canada toward the end of the 18th century. In an attempt to discourage speculation and distribute land according to the prevailing paradigm, Upper Canada was divided into three separate categories: crown, clergy and township. 19 counties were identified with townships contained 200-acre (0.81 km^{2}) lots with concession roads.

While the land distribution scheme of John Graves Simcoe worked well for a few years, the issues of settlement became more complex and required more land. Moreover, the issue of Clergy Reserves became a controversial issue. Efforts to streamline the land distribution process resulted in the private enterprise Canada Company, while the Crown pursued the purchase of more Native land resulting in the Huron Tract among others.

== Evolution of the Huron Block ==
From the land bordering the Lake Huron, the following were selected by the First Nation Chiefs as reserved for their exclusive use:

Reserve	Area
Upper Reserve on the St. Clair River (Sarnia)	10,280 acres (41.6 km^{2})
Lower Reserve on the St. Clair River (Moore Township)	2,575 acres (10.42 km^{2})
Mouth of the River aux Sable on Lake Huron	2,650 acres (10.7 km^{2})
Kettle Point on Lake Huron	2,446 acres (9.90 km^{2})

The Canada Company acquired 1,000,000 acres (4,000 km^{2}) of the Huron Block, which came to be known as the Huron Tract. The tract, together with the Crown Reserves not leased in townships surveyed before March 1, 1824, formed the lands that they intended to sell.

In 1835, the Huron Block townships were transferred into the following counties:

Townships surveyed in the Huron Tract, and counties to which they were assigned (1835)
Huron County	Middlesex County	Kent County (Now in Lambton County)
Biddulph; Blanshard; Colborne; Downie; Ellice; South Easthope; North Easthope; Fullarton; Goderich; Hay; Hibbert; Hullett; Logan; McKillop; McGillivray; Stephen; Stanley; Tuckersmith; Usborne; Williams	Adelaide	Bosanquet; Brooke; Enniskillen; Moore; Plympton; Sarnia; Warwick

The townships of the original Huron County have since devolved to the following counties:

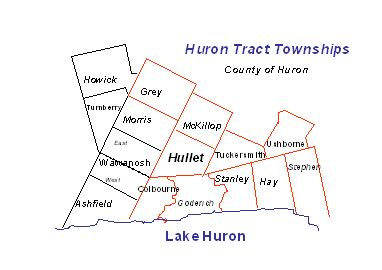
Huron County

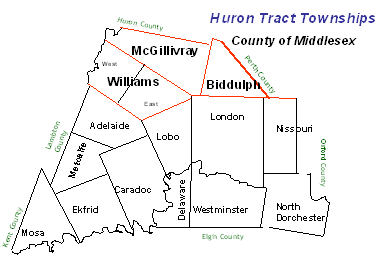
Middlesex County

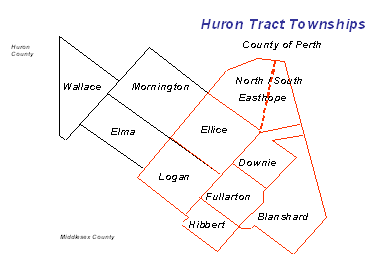
Perth County

The inclusion of the portions of land known as the Clergy reserves was cause for concern in the colony where the decisions about the Huron Tract had been made in isolation in Britain. The Family Compact and the Anglican Church in Canada led by Bishop John Strachan opposed this inclusion. After much lobbying, the influential bishop was able to return the lands to the Church. One of the seeds of discontent that led to the Rebellion of 1837 was sown in this decision.

=== Township name provenance ===
The Huron Tract was divided into 21 townships in 1824. Five townships were named for senior members of the British government: Colborne, Goderich, Hay, Stanley and Stephen. The remaining townships were named for members of the Canada Company Provisional Committee. The exception is Easthope Township which was divided into North and South, as it was felt that the original division was too large. The original surveys were conducted by Deputy Provincial Surveyor John McDonald, although Goderich Township was surveyed by Deputy Provincial Surveyor David Gibson.

Directors Edward Ellice, Simon McGillivray, Hart Logan and Henry Usborne, had lived in Canada at various times. Edward Stanley, the 14th Earl of Derby visited Canada in 1824.

The following townships were named for the Canada Company's Provisional Committee members of 1824.

- Biddulph Township for John Biddulph.
- Bosanquet Township for Charles Bosanquet.
- Colborne Township for Sir John Colborne (later John Colborne, 1st Baron Seaton).
- Downie Township for Robert Downie, MP.
- Easthope Township (North & South) for Sir John Easthope, MP.
- Ellice Township for Edward Ellice, MP.
- Fullarton Township for John Fullarton
- Goderich Township for Frederick John Robinson, created Viscount Goderich of Nocton.
- Hibbert Township for William T. Hibbert
- Hullett Township for John Hullett
- Logan Township for Hart Logan
- McGillivray Township for Simon McGillivray
- Stanley Township for Edward Stanley, MP
- Stephen Township for James Stephen, MP
- Williams Township for William Williams, MP
- Usborne Township for Henry Usborne
- Blanshard Township was named for Richard Blanshard, Canada Company Provisional Committee members of 1829.
- Hay Township was named for Robert William Hay, 2nd undersecretary of state for colonies (1825) and later Permanent undersecretary for the North American department 1828 - 1836.

== Conditions of sale for parcels of land ==
No person, except United Englishmen, Loyalists (on the separation of the United States from Great Britain, those who preserved their allegiance to the British Crown and fled to Canada, were entitled to 200 acres of land each, by Act of Parliament), or those entitled by existing regulations to the Government free grants, can obtain any of the waste Crown lands otherwise than by purchase. The sales take place under the direction of a Commissioner on the first and third Tuesday of every month in the different districts. The lands are put at an upset price, of which notice is given at the time of advertising the sale, and the conditions are one-fourth of the purchase-money paid down; the remainder at three equal annual instalments, with interest at 6 percent, payable on and with each instalment: when this is completed, a patent for the lands is issued, free of charge.

The conditions of sale for land in the Huron Tract were open to interpretation. Sir John Robinson, 1st Baronet, of Toronto, an important member of the 9th Parliament of Upper Canada, felt that those persons who automatically became American citizens after 1783 should be required to renounce their American citizenship to qualify as a Loyalist. The opposition, the Colborne Clique, had a different opinion and were able to sway a victory in defiance of the Family Compact and Sir John Robinson's position. This issue is one of many that led to the Rebellion of 1837. Another issue pertinent to the conditions of sale, was who qualified for the Government free grants and who did not.

== Plaque ==
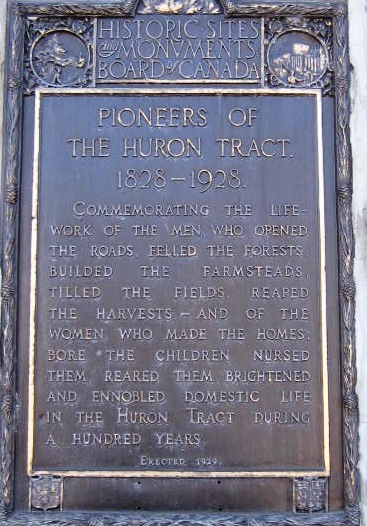
Historic Sites and Monuments Board of Canada Plaque. Erected 1929.

Pioneers of the Huron Tract 1828-1928

Commemorating the life work of the men who opened the roads, felled the forests, builded the farmsteads, tilled the fields, reaped the harvests—and of the women who made the homes, bore the children, nursed them, reared them, brightened and ennobled domestic life in the Huron Tract during a hundred years.

Historic Sites and Monuments Board of Canada.

=== Related plaques ===
https://www.genealogy.com/forum/surnames/topics/seebach/43/

- Colonel Anthony Van Egmond 1778-1838 (Anthony Van Egmond)
- The Founding of Goderich (Goderich, Ontario)
- Thomas Mercer Jones 1795-1868 (Thomas Mercer Jones)
- "Tiger" Dunlop 1792-1848 (William "Tiger" Dunlop)
- The Founding of Bayfield (Bayfield, Ontario)
- Fryfogel's Inn 1845, Neoclassical architecture Huron Road, Huron Tract.
- The Wilberforce Settlement 1830 (Wilberforce Colony)

== Geography ==
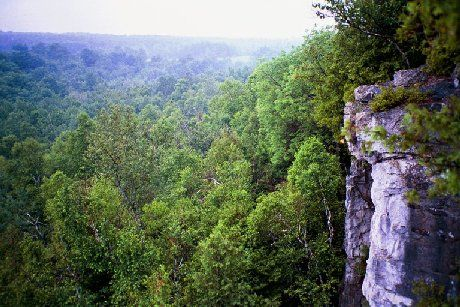
Bruce Trail forest

In 1841, the Huron Tract was 1,200,000 acres (4,900 km^{2}) with another parcel about to be added that would take the total to over 1.7 million acres (6,900 km^{2}). The Huron Tract would eventually total 2,756,960 acres (11,157 km^{2}).

William "Tiger" Dunlop describes the land as loamy, or, sandy loam with a limestone gravel on the verge of the lakes. The whole of the area is characterised as covered with considerable vegetable mold. Dunlop also describes the bedrock as a recent formation of limestone varied with sandstone.

=== Minerals ===
Lakeshores featured detached masses of rock of the Serpentine group. Granite in red, silver and gray were visible. Pyrite or fools gold could be seen embedded in clay slate, particularly at Kettle Point.

=== Rivers ===
The major rivers within the Huron Tract are:

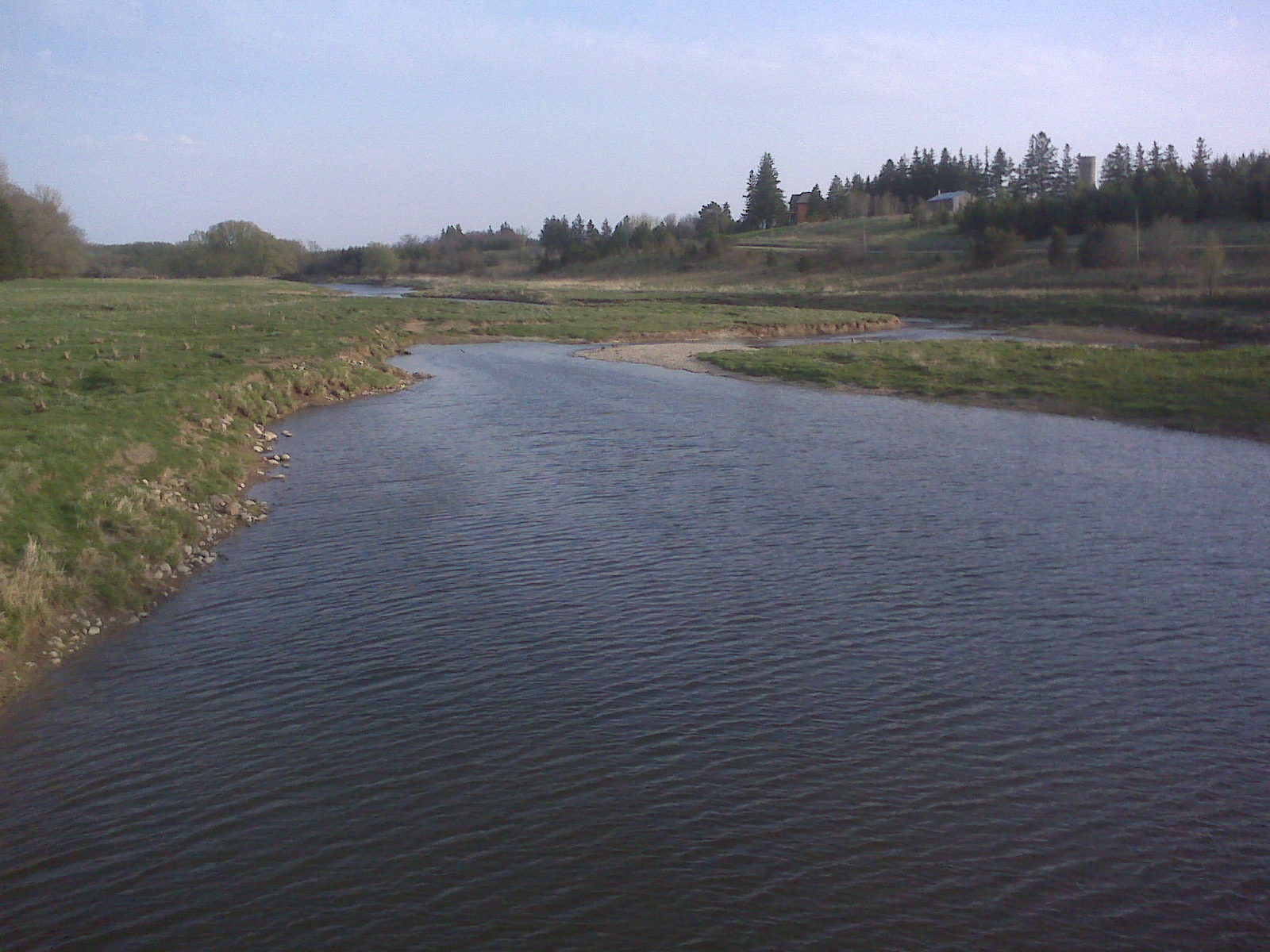
North Branch of the Thames near Stratford, Ontario

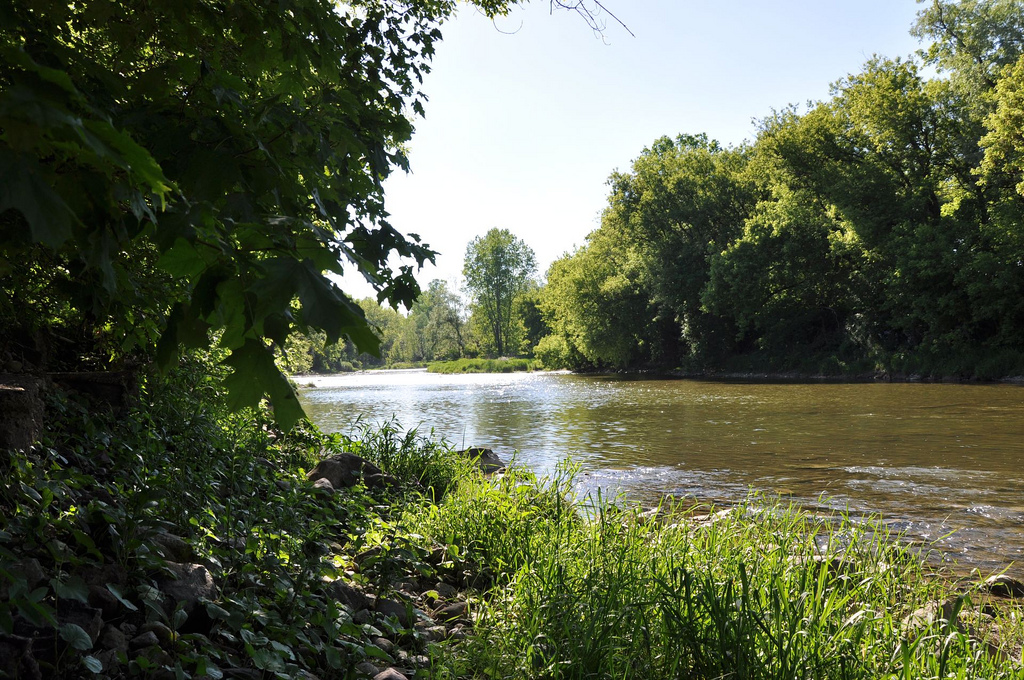
Nith River near Canning, Ontario

- Thames River (Ontario)
- Bayfield River
- Maitland River
- Nith River
- St. Clair River
- Ausable River (Lake Huron)

=== Land features ===
The ecozone of the former Huron Tract is Mixedwood Plains. Although very little of the originally heavily forested area still stand, some isolated pockets of the old forest remain. They consist of eastern white pine, eastern hemlock, yellow birch, red pine, sugar maple, Quercus rubra(red oak), bassword and white elm. Historically, the southwest area of the Huron Tract contained a small portion of Carolinian forest or deciduous trees.

Ellice Swamp
- Interactive map of Ellice Swamp
- Location: Perth County, Ontario, Ontario, Canada
- Coordinates: 43°47′N 80°10′W
- Named for: Named with reference to Ellice Township (Ontario)
- Governing body: Upper Thames River Conservation Authority and Grand River Conservation Authority
- Website: http://www.thamesriver.on.ca/wetlands_and_natural_areas/ellice_gadshill_swamps.htm

A large cedar swamp was located in the townships of Ellice, Logan, McKillop, terminating in Hullett.

The largest area is known as the Ellice Swamp and the Gads Hill Swamp. Both are located between Milverton and Stratford Ontario. Ellice Swamp is 2,504 acres (1,013 ha). Gad Hill Swamp is 1,741 acres (705 ha). Ellice and Gads Hill are primarily owned by the Upper Thames River Conservation Authority; the northern section of Ellice Swamp being owned by the Grand River Conservation Authority A smaller area is known as Hullet Swamp or Hullett Provincial Wildlife Area. Currently the Hullett Provincial Wildlife Area is 2,200 hectares (5,400 acres) along the South Maitland River in the heart of Huron County.

=== Environmental significance ===
The former Huron Tract was once home to significant wetlands, swamps and one of the largest deer yards in Ontario. Currently, 3.4% of the former Huron Tract is wetland. Ellice Swamp is a Class 2 Provincially Significant wetland. Of other interest in the area are the Class 1 wetland Dorchester Swamp, the Class 2 wetland Sifton Bog and Golspie Swamp.

==== Conservation authorities ====
- Maitland Valley Conservation Authority
- Ausable Bayfield Conservation Authority
- Upper Thames River Conservation Authority
- St. Clair Region Conservation Authority

== See also ==
- List of cities and towns of Upper Canada
- The Canadas
- Former colonies and territories in Canada
- Timeline of Ontario history
