= Gentlemanly capitalism =

Theory of New Imperialism

Gentlemanly capitalism is a theory of New Imperialism first put forward by the historians Peter J. Cain and A. G. Hopkins in the 1980s and developed in their 1993 work British Imperialism. The theory posits that British imperialism was driven by the business interests of the City of London and landed interests. It encourages a shift of emphasis, away from seeing provincial manufacturers and geopolitical strategy as important influences, and towards seeing the expansion of empire as emanating from London and the financial sector.
