= Thomas Mercer Jones =

English administrator of Canada

- Born: 1795; England
- Died: 2 October 1868; Toronto, Ontario, Canada
- Monuments: Ontario Historical Plaques: Thomas Mercer Jones, 1795–1868
- Occupations: Businessman and Banker
- Years active: 53
- Employer(s): Canada Company and later Bank of Montreal
- Known for: Inspiring Stratford, Ontario's name.
- Title: Co-Commissioner of the Canada Company
- Term: 1829–1850
- Predecessor: William Allan
- Successor: Frederick Widder
- Political party: Family Compact and later Colborne Clique
- Opponents: Colborne Clique and later Family Compact
- Spouse: Elizabeth Mary Strachan

Thomas Mercer Jones (1795 – 2 October 1868) was an English-born administrator who arrived in Upper Canada in the 1820s and was employed as a commissioner of the Canada Company based in Goderich. A series of internal conflicts led to his dismissal in 1852. He died in Toronto.
