= Canada Company =

British land development company

The Canada Company
- The Canada Company's arms
- Type: Chartered company
- Industry: Land development
- Founded: 1826 (by royal charter)
- Founder: John Galt
- Defunct: 1953
- Fate: Dissolved
- Headquarters: No. 13, St. Helen's Place, Bishopsgate Street, London, England
- Number of locations: Huron Tract, Queen's Bush, Clergy Reserves
- Area served: Upper Canada
- Key people: John Galt, William Dunlop, Thomas Mercer Jones, William Allan, Daniel Lizars
- Services: Land, roads, mills
- Total equity: 2,000,000 acres (8,100 km^{2}) of land

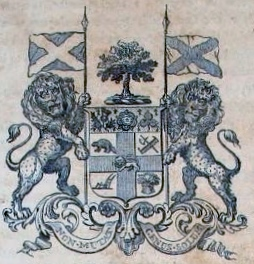
Historic emblazonment of the company's arms

The Canada Company was a private British land development company that was established to aid in the colonization of a large part of Upper Canada. It was incorporated by royal charter on August 19, 1826, under the Canada Company Act 1825 (6 Geo. 4. c. 75) of the British parliament, which was given royal assent on June 27, 1825. It was originally formed to acquire and develop Upper Canada's undeveloped clergy reserves and Crown reserves, which the company bought in 1827 for £341,000 ($693,000) from the Province of Upper Canada.

Founded by the Scottish novelist John Galt, who became its first Superintendent, the company was successful in populating an area called the Huron Tract – an enterprise later called "the most important single attempt at settlement in Canadian history". This resulted in the Mississauga people being dispossessed of their ancestral lands.

The company is unrelated to the modern-day Canadian charity of the same name (Canada Company: Many Ways to Serve), founded in 2006 by Blake Goldring, which assists former Canadian military members and their spouses in regaining civilian employment after service in the Canadian Armed Forces.

== Acquisition of lands ==
Acquisition of Canada Company lands
Amount	Area	Lands
£195,850 ($398,000)	1,384,413 acres (5,603 km^{2})	Crown reserves
£145,150 ($295,000)	1,100,000 acres (4,452 km^{2})	Recently acquired by the government, from the Chippewa First Nation, in what would become the Huron Tract, located on the eastern shore of Lake Huron, in substitution for the originally contemplated 829,430 acres (3,357 km^{2}) of clergy reserve lands. One-third of the purchase price went to fund public works and improvements, while the remaining two-thirds was paid to the Crown.

== Mission ==
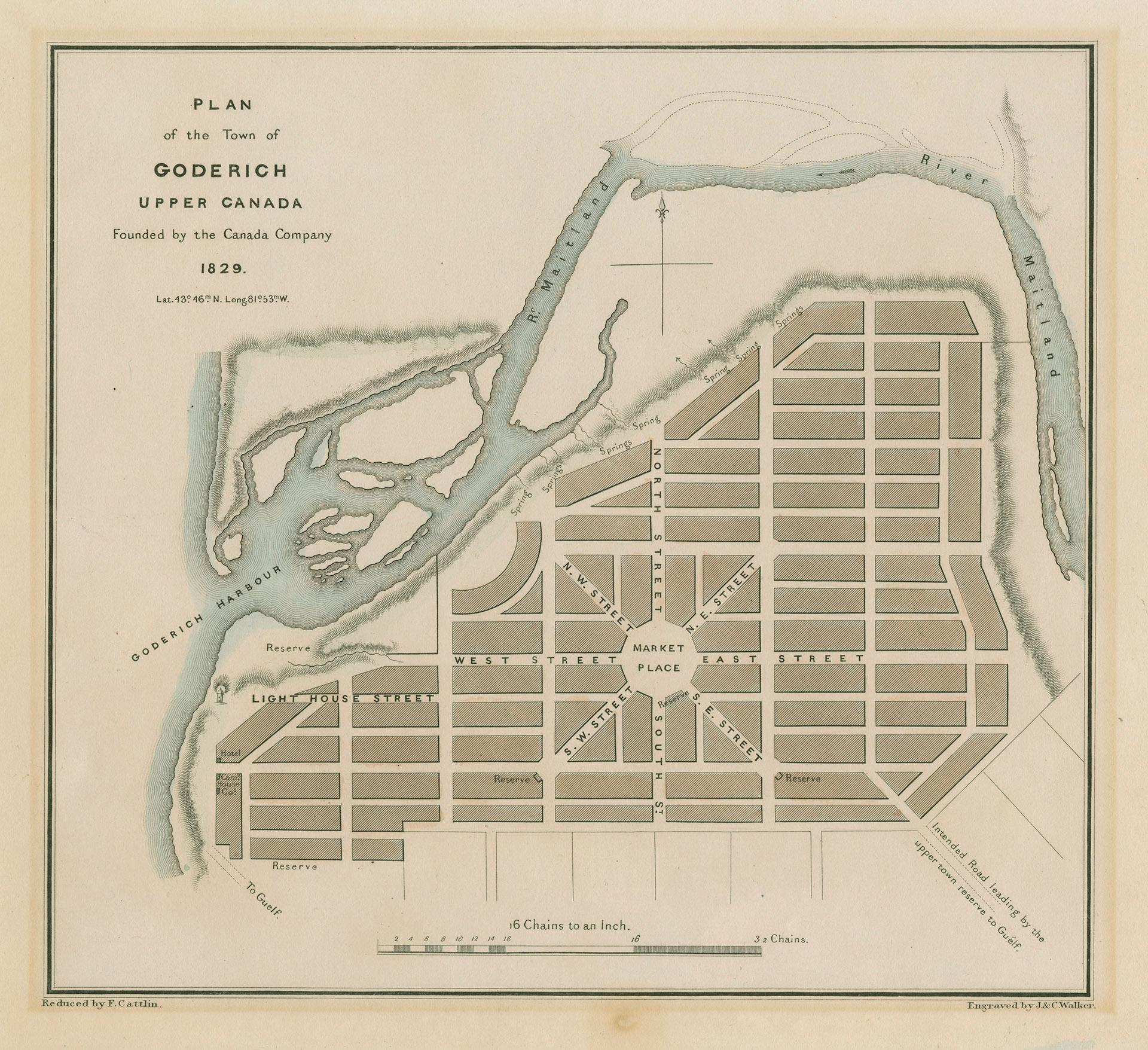
Plan of the town of Goderich, Upper Canada, which was founded by the Canada Company, 1829

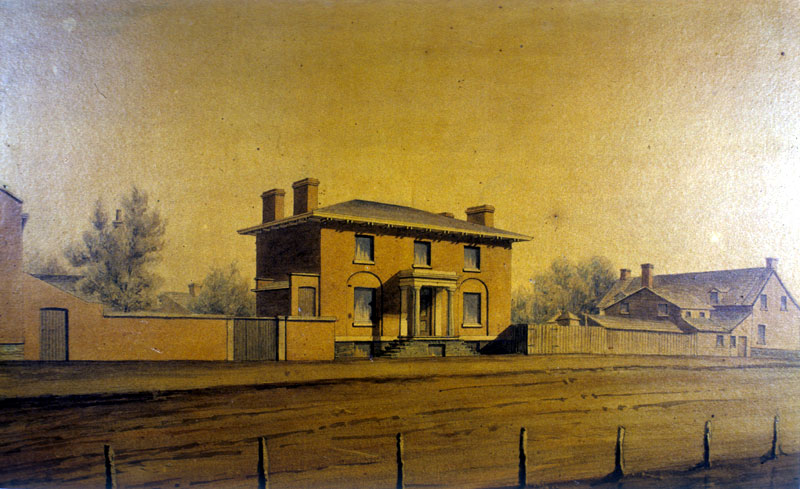
The Canada Company's office in Toronto, 1834

The Canada Company assisted emigrants by providing good ships, low fares, implements and tools, and inexpensive land. Scottish novelist John Galt was the company's first Canadian superintendent. He first settled in York (Toronto, Ontario) but selected Guelph as the company's headquarters, and his home. The area was previously part of the Halton Block, 42,000 acres of former Crown land. Galt would later be considered as the founder of Guelph.

In 1765, both Campobello and Deer Island were granted by the Crown to the Canada Company.

The company surveyed and subdivided the massive Huron Tract, built roads, mills, and schools and advertised lots for sale to buyers in Europe. The town of Goderich was laid out on the shores of Lake Huron to be the centre of the settlement of the Huron Tract. The company then assisted in the migration of new settlers, bringing them to the area by means of a steamboat, which the company also owned, on Lake Ontario.

John Galt was dismissed and recalled to Great Britain in 1829, for mismanagement, particularly incompetent bookkeeping. General mismanagement and corruption within the company, and its close alliance with the Tory elites, known as the Family Compact, were important contributing factors to the Upper Canada Rebellion in 1837.

In 1833, his colleague William "Tiger" Dunlop took over as Superintendent of the Company and continued Galt's work for a short time before resigning.

== Company structure ==
Appointed Secretary of the Canada Company in 1824 John Galt helped to obtain a charter for the company on 19 August 1826. On that date, the formal structure of the Canada Company was put into place by the company's Court of Directors. John Galt, as secretary, had the first order of business. Tabling an abstract of the charter, Galt declared the name to be "The Canada Company" with directors and secretary as served on the Provisional Committee and listed in the charter.

At the first meeting of the board, it was declared that four directors would rotate off the Company beginning in 1829.

Structure of Canada Company
Position	Persons concerned
Directors	Robert Biddulph; Robert Downie; Edward Ellice; Richard Blanshard; John Easthope; John Fullarton; Charles David Gordon; John Hodgson; Hart Logan; James McKillop; Martin Tucker Smith; William Williams; William Hibbert; John Hullet; Simon McGillivray; John Masterman; Henry Usborne
Chairman	Charles Bosanquet, William Williams (Deputy Chairman)
Secretary	John Galt
Auditors	Thomas Harling Benson; Thomas Wilson; Thomas Poynder; John Woolley
Solicitors	Freshfield and Kaye
Bankers	Masterman and Company; Cocks, Cocks, Ridge and Biddulph

Key Canada Company staff
Person	Role
John Galt	Founder (1824–26), secretary (1824–1832), and first superintendent (1827–1829).
William Allan	Commissioner of the Canada Company (1829–1841).
Frederick Widder	Commissioner of the Canada Company (1839–1864).
Thomas Mercer Jones	Commissioner of the Canada Company (1829–1852).
William Benjamin Robinson	Commissioner of the Canada Company (1852–1865), Senior Commissioner after 1865.
Dr. William "Tiger" Dunlop	Warden of the Forests, later becoming Superintendent of the Canada Company.

People influential in Canada Company affairs
Person	Role
Richard Alexander Tucker	Provincial Secretary of Upper Canada, having considerable influence over decisions made concerning the Company in its early years.
Sir Peregrine Maitland	Lieutenant governor of Upper Canada. He became associated with the Family Compact. His authoritarian leadership style was one of the causes of the Rebellion of 1837.
Bishop Macdonnell	Roman Catholic Bishop attacked by William Lyon Mackenzie. Alexander Macdonell was a Roman Catholic Scotsman who accepted the government promise of 200 acres (0.81 km^{2}) in Upper Canada to every soldier who emigrated. He had been the chaplain of a Catholic Scottish Glengarry regiment. Macdonell was a conservative legislative councillor from 1831 leading the mainly Irish settlers against the Reform movement and Mackenzie.
Bishop Strachan	Protagonist in the Clergy Reserves issue. An executive councillor in 1817 and legislative councillor in 1820 in the government of Upper Canada, Bishop Strachan sought special status for the Anglican church.

== Dissolution ==
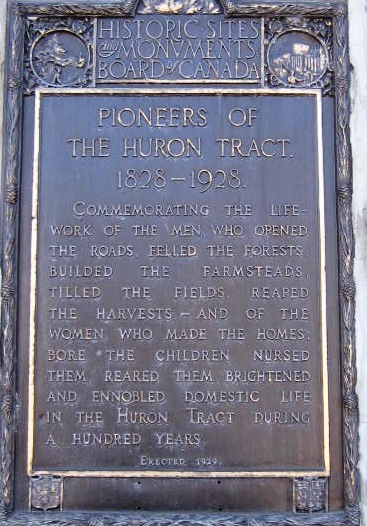
Historic Sites and Monuments Board of Canada Plaque. Erected 1929.

The company retained the mineral rights of the land it sold. In 1919, it quitclaimed and transferred those rights to the Crown. In 1922 and 1923, the Legislative Assembly of Ontario authorized the granting of those rights to landholders at a set price.

In 1928, a plaque was erected in Huron county, Pioneers of the Huron Tract 1828-1928, commemorating the work of the men who developed the Huron Tract and the families who lived there, starting in 1828.

By 1938, the Canada Company held just over 20,000 acres (81 km^{2}) of unsold land, while the company shares were valued at 10 shillings. It had become a land company in the process of liquidation. By 1950, only 4,207 acres (17.03 km^{2}) remained in its possession, distributed amongst Lambton County, the United Counties of Leeds and Grenville and Lanark County.

In 1951, the remaining land was disposed of, and land that was unsold became Pinery Provincial Park.

The company voted to wind up its affairs on August 12, 1953, and was dissolved on December 18, 1953.

== Arms ==
Coat of arms of Canada Company
Crest An oak tree eradicated proper. Escutcheon Argent on a cross Gules a lion passant guardant Or between in the first quarter a beaver statant in the second quarter a saw surmounted by an axe in saltire in the third quarter a plough and in the fourth quarter a garb roper on a chief Erminois a Tudor rose between a thistle and a trefoil roper. Supporters Two lions guardant Or each supporting a flag staff Proper the dexter flying a banner Azure a saltire Argent the sinister flying a banner Argent a saltire Gules. Motto Non Mutat Genus Solum

== See also ==
- Huron Tract
- Family Compact
- William "Tiger" Dunlop, MP
- Robert Graham Dunlop, MP

== Sources ==
- Galt, John (1833). The autobiography of John Galt, 1779-1839. Vol. II. Philadelphia: Key & Biddle.
- Armstrong, Frederick H. (1985). Handbook of Upper Canadian Chronology (Revised ed.). Dundurn. ISBN 1-55002-543-0.
- Cameron, James McIntyre; Cameron, June Carolyn (1967). The early days in Guelph: Guelph and the Canada Company (PhD). Guelph: University of Guelph. OCLC 670494628.
- Coleman, Thelma; Anderson, James (1978). The Canada Company. Stratford: County of Perth and Cumming Publishers. ISBN 978-0-88988-029-0.
- Hall, Roger Dennis (1973). The Canada Company, 1826–1843 (PhD). University of Cambridge. OCLC 500461425.
- Karr, Clarence (1974). The Canada Land Company : the Early Years, an Experiment in Colonization 1823–1843. Toronto: Ontario Historical Society. OCLC 1230954.
- Lee, Robert C. (2004). The Canada Company and the Huron Tract 1826–1853: Personalities, Profits and Politics. Toronto: Natural Heritage Books. ISBN 1-896219-94-2.
- Lizars, Robina; Macfarlane Lizars, Kathleen (1896). In the days of the Canada company: The story of the settlement of the Huron tract and a view of the social life of the period (1825–1850). Introduction by G.M. Grant. Montreal and Halifax: William Briggs.
- Timothy, H. B. (1984). The Galts, a Canadian odyssey. Toronto: McClelland and Stewart. ISBN 0-7710-8457-9.
