= Family Compact =

Oligarchic political clique in Upper Canada (1810s to 1840s)

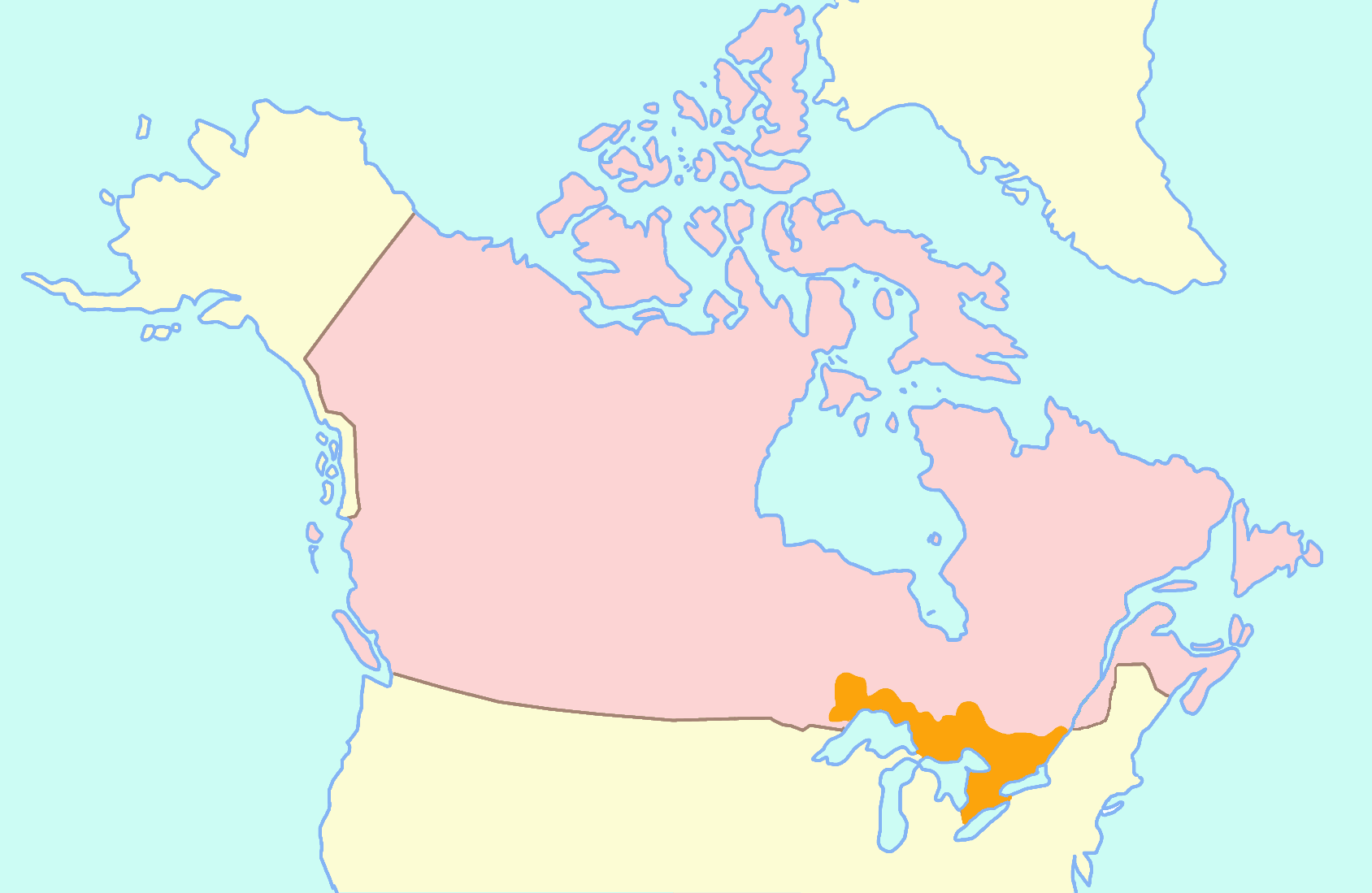
- Map of Upper Canada (orange) within British North America (pink)
- Dissolved: 1848
- Purpose: Informal political clique
- Location: York, Upper Canada
- Region served: Upper Canada
- Official language: English
- Leader: Sir John Robinson (26 July 1791 – 31 January 1863)

The Family Compact was a small closed group of men who exercised most of the political, economic and judicial power in Upper Canada (mostly analogous to today's Ontario) from the 1810s to the 1840s. It was the Upper Canadian equivalent of the Château Clique in Lower Canada. It was noted for its conservatism and opposition to democracy.

The Family Compact emerged from the War of 1812 and collapsed in the aftermath of the Rebellions of 1837–1838. Its resistance to the political principle of responsible government contributed to its short life. At the end of its lifespan, the compact was condemned by Lord Durham, a leading Whig, who summarised its grip on power:

Fortified by family connexion, and the common interest felt by all who held, and all who desired, subordinate offices, that party was thus erected into a solid and permanent power, controlled by no responsibility, subject to no serious change, exercising over the whole government of the Province an authority utterly independent of the people and its representatives, and possessing the only means of influencing either the Government at home, or the colonial representative of the Crown.

== Etymology ==
Thomas Dalton described the ruling class in Kingston as "all one family compacted junto." The term Family Compact appeared in a letter written by Marshall Spring Bidwell to William Warren Baldwin in 1828. Family did not mean relations by marriage, but rather a close brotherhood. Lord Durham noted in 1839 "There is, in truth, very little of family connection among the persons thus united". The phrase was popularised by William Lyon Mackenzie in 1833 in its use to describe the elite in York.

== "Gentlemanly capitalism" and British colonialism ==
The historians P. J. Cain and A. G. Hopkins have emphasized that the British Empire at "the mid-nineteenth century represented the extension abroad of the institutions and principles entrenched at home". Upper Canada, created in the very "image and transcript" of the British constitution is but one example. Like that of the United Kingdom, the constitution of Upper Canada was established on the mixed monarchy model. Mixed monarchy is a form of government that integrates elements of democracy, aristocracy, and monarchy. Upper Canada, however, had no aristocracy. The methods pursued to create one were similar to that used in Britain itself. The result was the Family Compact.

Cain and Hopkins point out that "new money", the financiers rather than the industrial "barons", were gradually gentrified through the purchase of land, intermarriage and the acquisition of titles. In the United Kingdom, the control exercised by the aristocracy over the House of Commons remained undisturbed before 1832 and was only slowly eroded thereafter, while its dominance of the executive lasted well beyond 1850." Hopkins and Cain refer to this alliance of aristocracy and financiers as "gentlemanly capitalism": "a form of capitalism headed by improving aristocratic landlords in association with improving financiers who served as their junior partners." A similar pattern is seen in other colonial empires, such as the Dutch Empire.

This same process is seen in Upper Canada. The historian J. K. Johnson's analysis of the Upper Canadian elite between 1837 and 1840 measured influence according to overlapping leadership roles on the boards of the main social, political and economic institutions. For example, William Allan, one of the most powerful, "was an executive councillor, a legislative councillor, President of the Toronto and Lake Huron Railroad, Governor of the British American Fire and Life Assurance Company and President of the Board of Trade." Johnson's conclusion contests the common assertion that "none of the leading members of the Compact were business men, and ... the system of values typical of the Compact accorded scant respect to business wealth as such." The overlapping social, political and economic leadership roles of the Family Compact demonstrates, he argues, that

they were not a political elite taking political decisions in a vacuum, but an overlapping elite whose political and economic activities cannot be entirely separated from each other. They might even be called 'entrepreneurs', most of whose political views may have been highly conservative but whose economic outlook was clearly 'developmental'.

The Family Compact's role in the Welland Canal is one example.

Elite Upper Canadians sought "gentility" including the acquisition of landed estates, roles as Justices of the Peace, military service, the pursuit of "improved farming", grammar school education, ties to the Church of England – all in combination with the acquisition of wealth through the Bank of Upper Canada amongst others. It is through the pursuit of gentility that the Family Compact was born.

=== Constitutional context ===
Upper Canada did not have a hereditary nobility. In its place, senior members of Upper Canada bureaucracy, the Executive Council of Upper Canada and Legislative Council of Upper Canada, made up the elite of the compact. These men sought to solidify their personal positions into family dynasties and acquire all the marks of gentility. They used their government positions to extend their business and speculative interests.

The origins of the Family Compact lay in overlapping appointments made to the Executive and Legislative councils of Upper Canada. The councils were intended to operate independently. Section 38 of the Constitutional Act of 1791 referred to the independence of the offices indirectly. While Sir Guy Carleton, Lieutenant Governor of Lower Canada, pointed out that the offices were intended to be separate, Lord Grenville set the wheels in motion with John Graves Simcoe, Lieutenant Governor of Upper Canada, by pointing out that there was no legal impediment to prevent cross-appointments. Simcoe used the vague statement in Section 38 to make the following appointments

Family Compact political appointments circa 1794
Executive Council of Upper Canada	William Osgoode; William Robertson; Alexander Grant; Peter Russell; James Baby
Legislative Council of Upper Canada	William Osgoode; William Robertson; Alexander Grant; Peter Russell; Richard Duncan; Robert Hamilton; Richard Cartwright; John Munro

The Family Compact exerted influence over the government through the Executive Council and Legislative Council, the advisers to the lieutenant governor, leaving the popularly elected Legislative Assembly with little real power. As became clear with Lieutenant Governor Sir Francis Bond Head, the influence of the Family Compact could be quite limited as well. Members ensured their conservative friends held the important administrative and judicial positions in the colony through political patronage.

=== Membership ===
The centre of the compact was York (later renamed Toronto), the capital. Its most important member was Bishop John Strachan; many of the other members were his former students, or people who were related to him. The most prominent of Strachan's pupils was Sir John Beverley Robinson who was from 1829 the Chief Justice of Upper Canada for 34 years. The rest of the members were mostly descendants of United Empire Loyalists or recent upper-class British settlers such as the Boulton family, builders of the Grange.

A triumvirate of lawyers, Levius Sherwood (speaker of the Legislative Council, judge in the Court of King's Bench), Judge Jonas Jones, and Attorney General Henry John Boulton were linked by professional and business ties, and by marriage; both Sherwood and Boulton being married to Jones’ sisters. Collectively, their extended family (if we include the Robinsons, and James B. Macaulay, Boulton's former clerk) comprise three quarters of the "Family Compact" listed by Mackenzie in 1833.

Elite Members
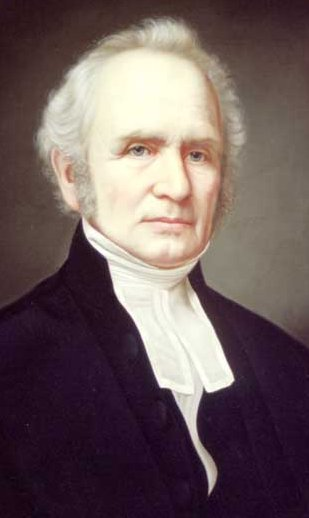
John Robinson. Acknowledged leader of the Family Compact. Member of the Legislative Assembly and later the Legislative Council.

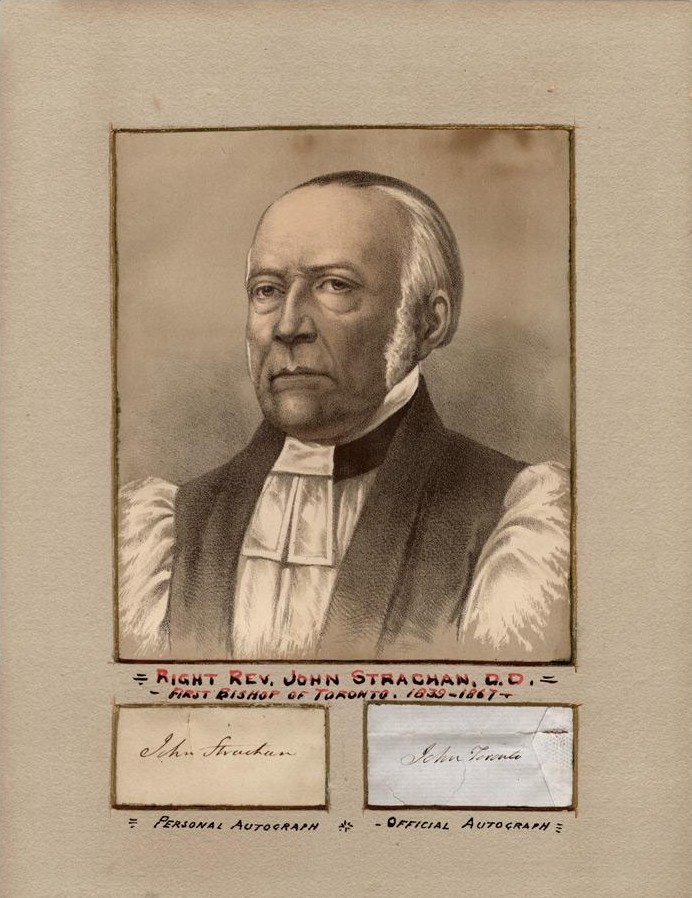
Bishop Strachan. Acknowledged Anglican leader in the Family Compact.

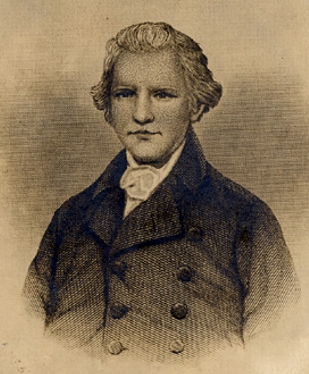
William Osgoode. 1st Chief Justice of Upper Canada notable for allowing non-Anglican priests to solemnize marriages.

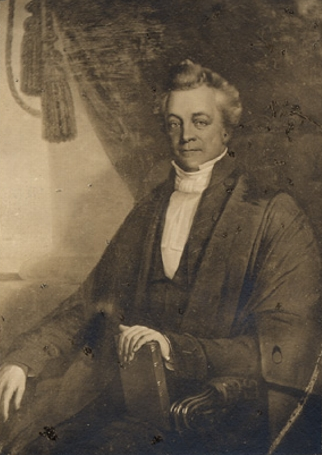
Jonas Jones, lawyer, banker

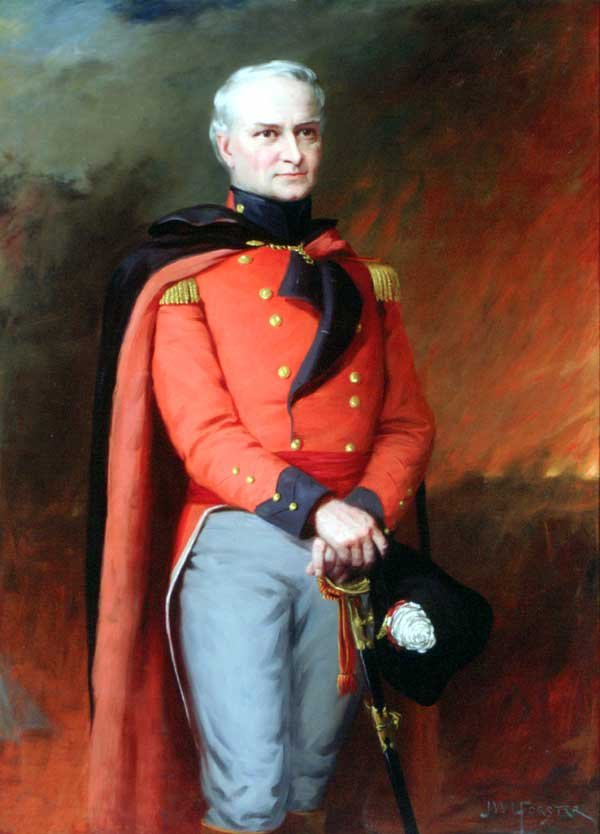
Æneas Shaw. Early member of the compact. Appointed to the Executive Council and Legislative Council of Upper Canada in 1794.

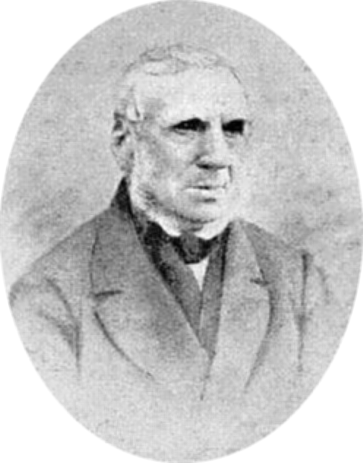
Col. James FitzGibbon, militia commander

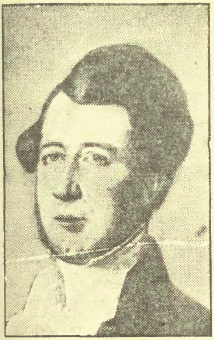
William Henry Boulton 8th Mayor of Toronto and member of the Legislative Assembly

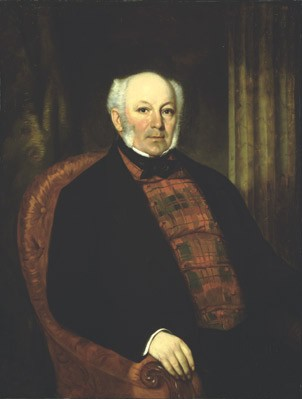
Sir Allan Napier MacNab, 1st Baronet Legislative Assembly of Upper Canada

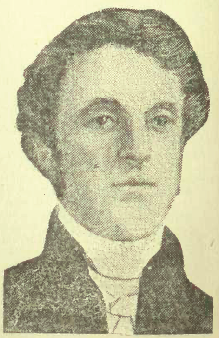
Henry Sherwood, 13th Parliament of Upper Canada representing Brockville

Sir James Buchanan Macaulay, CB

=== Loyalist ideology ===
The uniting factors amongst the compact were its loyalist tradition, hierarchical class structure and adherence to the established Anglican church. Leaders such as Sir John Robinson and John Strachan proclaimed it an ideal government, especially as contrasted with the rowdy democracy in the nearby United States.

Not all views of the elite were universally shared, but a critical element was the idea of "loyalty". The original members of the Family Compact were United Empire Loyalists who had fled the United States immediately after the Revolutionary War. The War of 1812 led the British to suspect the loyalty of the so-called "Later Loyalists" – "Americans" who had emigrated after 1800 for land. The issue came to a head around 1828 in the "Alien Question". Following the war, the colonial government took active steps to prevent Americans from swearing allegiance, thereby making them ineligible to obtain land grants. Without land they could not vote or hold office.

The issue became a provincewide complaint in 1828 when Barnabas Bidwell was deprived of his seat in the Legislative Assembly. Educated at Yale, he practiced law in western Massachusetts and served as treasurer of Berkshire County. He served in the state legislature, and was the state attorney general from 1807 to 1810, when irregularities in the Berkshire County books prompted his flight to Upper Canada. There he won a seat in the provincial assembly, but was denied on account of his status as a fugitive from justice. A provincewide petitioning campaign by these numerically superior "aliens" led the British government to grant them citizenship retroactively. In the minds of the Family Compact, they remained politically suspect and barred from positions of power.

== Levers of power ==
In the absence of a landed elite, these men believed that the law should be the basis of social preeminence. Bound by the ideals of public service and a spirit of loyalty to king, church and empire, solidified in the crucible of the War of 1812, they used the Law Society of Upper Canada as a means of regulating entry to elite positions of power.

=== Government position ===
==== Executive and Legislative councils ====
The Executive Council was composed of local advisers who provided the colonially appointed lieutenant governor with advice on the daily workings of government, and especially with appointments to the administration. Members of the Executive Council were not necessarily members of the Legislative Assembly but were usually members of the Legislative Council. The longest serving members were James Baby (1792–1833), John Strachan (1815–1836), George Markland (1822–1836), and Peter Robinson (1823–1836).

The Legislative Council of Upper Canada was the upper house governing the province of Upper Canada. It was modelled after the British House of Lords. Members were appointed, often for life. The longest serving members were Baby (1792–1833), Jacob Mountain, Anglican Bishop of Quebec (1794–1825), Strachan (1820–1841), Markland (1822–1836), Peter Robinson (1823–1836), Thomas Talbot (1809–1841), Thomas Clark (1815–1841), William Dickson (1815–1841), John Henry Dunn (1822–1841), and William Allan (1825–1841).

==== Magistracy and courts of Quarter Sessions ====
Justices of the peace were appointed by the lieutenant governor. Any two justices meeting together could form the lowest level of the justice system, the Courts of Request. A Court of Quarter Sessions was held four times a year in each district composed of all the resident justices. The Quarter Sessions met to oversee the administration of the district and deal with legal cases. They formed, in effect, the municipal government and judiciary until an area was incorporated as either a police board or a city after 1834. The men appointed to the magistracy tended to be United Empire Loyalists or "half-pay" military officers who were placed in semi-retirement after the Napoleonic Wars.

==== Law Society and Juvenile Advocate's Society ====
The Law Society was created in 1797 to regulate the legal profession in the province. The society was headed by a treasurer. Every treasurer of the society before 1841 was a member of the Family Compact with the exception of William Warren Baldwin.

The control that the Family Compact exerted over the legal profession and the corruption that resulted was most clearly demonstrated in the "Types Riot" in 1826, in which the printing press of William Lyon Mackenzie was destroyed by the young lawyers of the Juvenile Advocate's Society with the complicity of the attorney general, the solicitor general and the magistrates of Toronto.

Mackenzie had published a series of satires under the pseudonym of "Patrick Swift, nephew of Jonathan Swift" in an attempt to humiliate the members of the Family Compact running for the board of the Bank of Upper Canada, and Henry John Boulton, the solicitor general, in particular. Mackenzie's articles worked, and they lost control. In revenge they sacked Mackenzie's press, throwing the type into the lake. The "juvenile advocates" were the students of the attorney general and the solicitor general, and the act was performed in broad daylight in front of William Allan, bank president and magistrate. They were never charged, and it was left to Mackenzie to launch a civil lawsuit instead.

There are three implications of the Types Riot according to historian Paul Romney. First, he argues the riot illustrates how the elite's self-justifications regularly skirted the rule of law they held out as their Loyalist mission. Second, he demonstrated that the significant damages Mackenzie received in his civil lawsuit against the vandals did not reflect the soundness of the criminal administration of justice in Upper Canada. And lastly, he sees in the Types Riot "the seed of the Rebellion" in a deeper sense than those earlier writers who viewed it simply as the start of a highly personal feud between Mackenzie and the Family Compact. Romney emphasizes that Mackenzie's personal harassment, the "outrage", served as a lightning rod of discontent because so many Upper Canadians had faced similar endemic abuses and hence identified their political fortunes with his.

=== Church of England ===
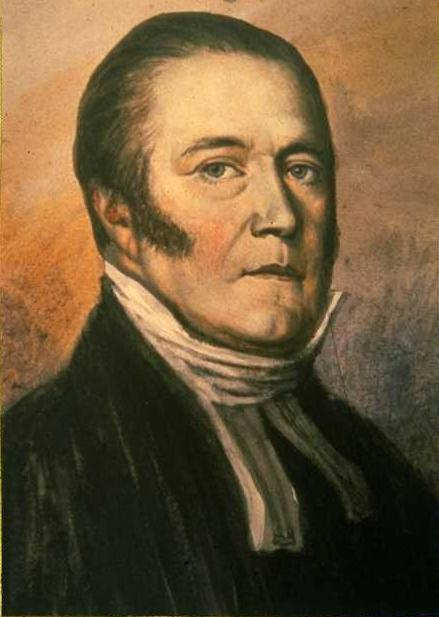
John Strachan

==== Established church ====
In 1836, as he was preparing to leave office, Lt Governor John Colborne endowed 44 Church of England rectories with about 300 acres (120 ha) of land each (21,638 acres (87.57 km^{2}) in all) in an effort to make the church more self-sufficient and less dependent on government aid.

==== Clergy reserves ====
The Clergy Corporation was incorporated in 1819 to manage the Clergy Reserves. After John Strachan was appointed to the Executive Council, the advisory body to the Lieutenant Governor, in 1815, he began to push for the Church of England's autonomous control of the clergy reserves on the model of the Clergy Corporation created in Lower Canada in 1817. Although all clergymen in the Church of England were members of the body corporate, the act prepared in 1819 by Strachan's former student, Attorney General John Beverly Robinson, also appointed the inspector general and the surveyor general to the board, and made a quorum of three for meetings; these two public officers also sat on the Legislative Council with Strachan. These three were usually members of the Family Compact.

==== Upper Canada College and King's College ====
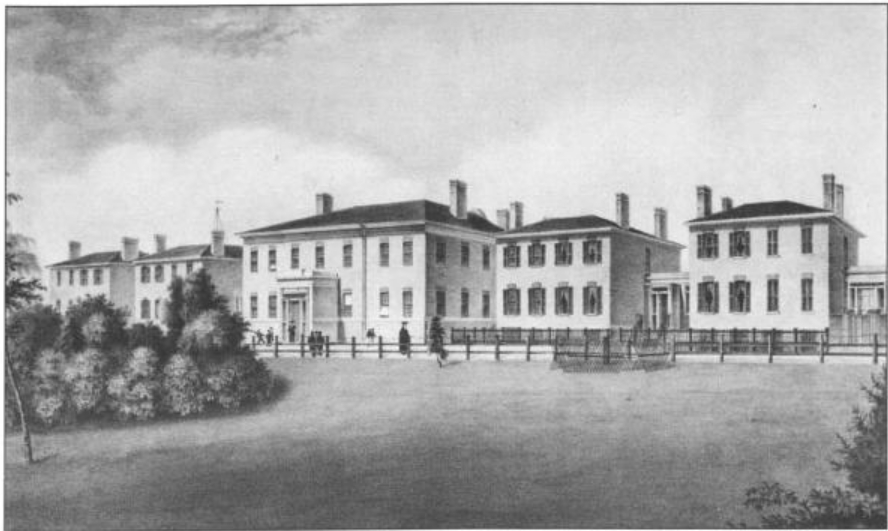
Upper Canada College, 1835

Grammar schools provided a classical education and were preparation for higher learning and entry into the law or the ministry. Entrance was limited by high tuition fees, even though they were government supported. Common schools for teaching basic education received little support or regulation in comparison at this time. Working class education was trades based through the Master-journeyman-apprentice relationship.

Upper Canada College was the successor to the Home District Grammar School taught by John Strachan, which became the Royal Grammar School in 1825. Upper Canada College was founded in 1829 by Lieutenant Governor Sir John Colborne (later Lord Seaton), to serve as a feeder school to the newly established King's College. It was modelled on the great public schools of Britain, most notably Eton. The school began teaching in the original Royal Grammar School and for several years the two organizations were essentially unified.

On March 15, 1827, a royal charter was formally issued for King's College (now the University of Toronto). The granting of the charter was largely the result of intense lobbying by John Strachan, who took office as the first president of the college. The original three-storey Greek Revival school building was constructed on the present site of Queen's Park. Upper Canada College merged with King's College for a period after 1831. Under Strachan's guidance, King's College was a religious institution that closely aligned with the Church of England and the Family Compact.

=== Bank of Upper Canada ===
The Bank of Upper Canada's principal promoters were Strachan and Allan. Allan, who became president, was also an executive and legislative councillor. He, like Strachan, played a key role in solidifying the Family Compact, and ensuring its influence within the colonial state. Boulton, the solicitor general, author of the bank incorporation bill, and the bank's lawyer, admitted the bank was a "terrible engine in the hands of the provincial administration". The government, its officers, and legislative councillors owned 5,381 of its 8,000 shares. The lieutenant governor appointed four of the bank's fifteen directors making for a tight bond between the nominally private company and the state. Forty-four men served as bank directors during the 1830s; eleven of them were executive councillors, fifteen of them were legislative councillors, and thirteen were magistrates in Toronto. Furthermore, all 11 men who had ever sat on the Executive Council also sat on the board of the bank at one time or another. Ten of these men also sat on the Legislative Council. The overlapping membership on the boards of the Bank of Upper Canada and on the Executive and Legislative councils served to integrate the economic and political activities of church, state, and the "financial sector". These overlapping memberships reinforced the oligarchic nature of power in the colony and allowed the administration to operate without any effective elective check. Despite these tight bonds, the receiver general, the reform-leaning John Henry Dunn, refused to use the bank for government business. The Bank of Upper Canada held a near monopoly, and as a result, controlled much of the trade in the province.

=== Land and agriculture ===
The role of speculation in the vacant lands of Upper Canada ensured the development of group solidarity and cohesion of interest among the members of the Family Compact. Of the 26 largest landowners in Peel County between 1820 and 1840, 23 were absentee proprietors, of whom 17 were involved in the administration of the province; of these 17, 12 were part of the Family Compact. Society and politics in Upper Canada were dominated by interest and connection based on landed property, and only secondarily affected by ideologies and personalities.

Members of the Family Compact were interested in building up estates in which they imitated the "improved farming" methods of the English aristocracy. "Improved farming" refers to a capital-intensive form of farming introduced by the "improving landlords" of Great Britain on large estates that were beginning to be farmed as capitalist enterprises. These improved farming methods were introduced to Upper Canada by the half-pay military officers from aristocratic background who tended to become magistrates in Upper Canada and build large estates. "Mixed or improved farming was one part of a total life-style ... As well as permitting them to practice improved farming and to develop a reasonably elegant life-style, their financial independence allowed them the leisure time necessary for them to act as 'leaders' of their community."

The city of Toronto was surrounded by the estates of the Family Compact. One of these estates, the Grange, was owned by Boulton and was one of the chief centres of the Family Compact. Although many meetings took place at the Grange, John Ross Robertson noted the small dining room, which could not hold more than 14 people, probably meant that many of the stories about the Family Compact gatherings were probably exaggerated.

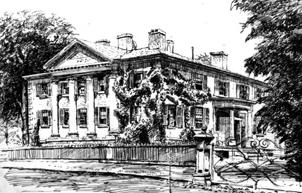
"Moss Park", 1889, the estate of William Allan

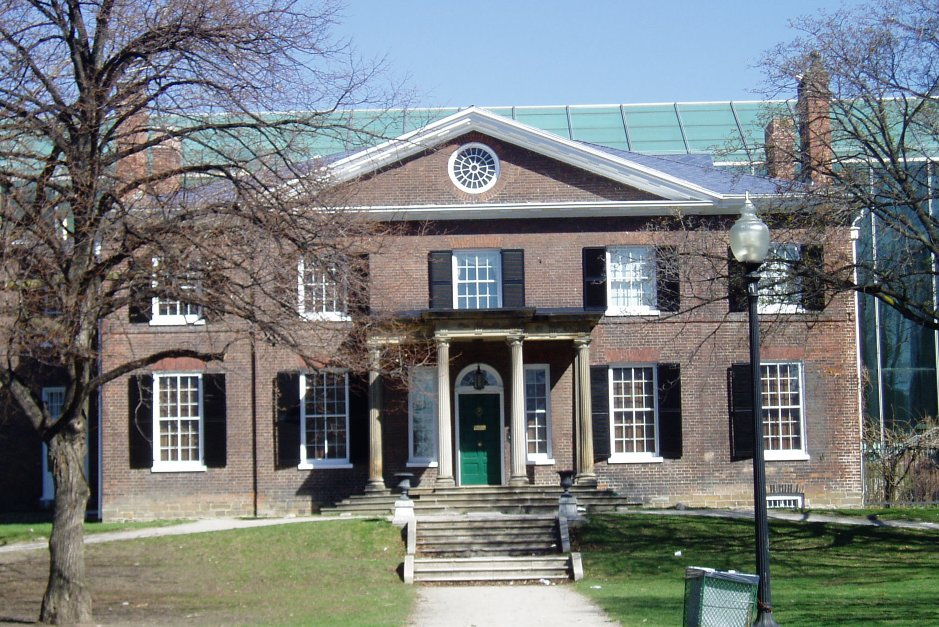
The Grange, estate of D'Arcy Boulton Jr.

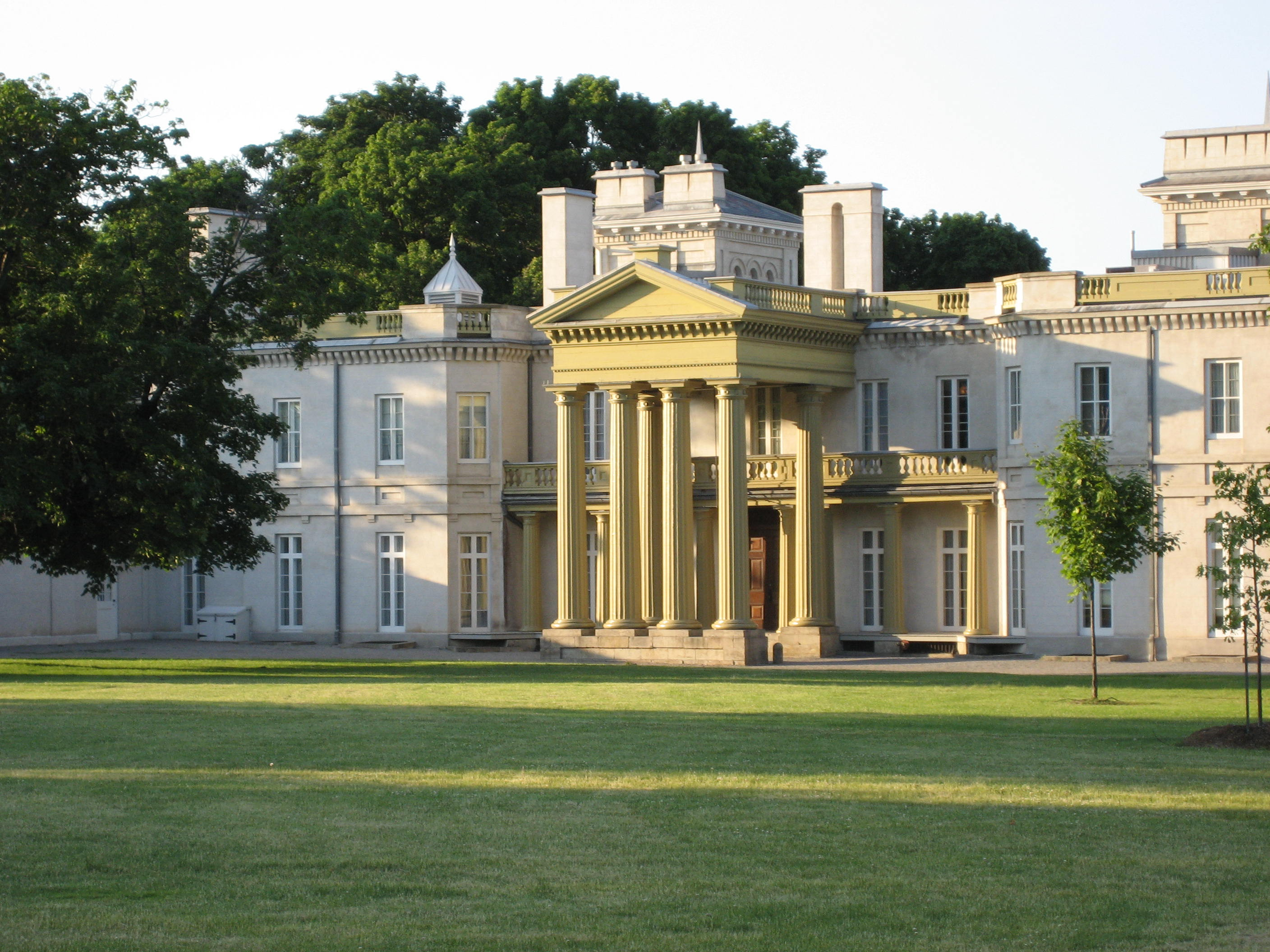
Dundurn Castle, Hamilton, estate of Sir Allen McNab

== Opposition ==
=== Reform movement ===
The Family Compact was one of many, distinguished primarily by its access to the offices of state. Other compact groups, such as the Baldwin-Russell-Sullivan family, in fact, shared many of the same values. The primary opposition to the Family Compact and these loyalist ideals came from the reform movement led by William Lyon Mackenzie. His ability to agitate through his newspaper The Colonial Advocate and petitioning was effective. Speeches and petitions led directly to the redress of grievances in Upper Canada that otherwise had no means of redress.

Mackenzie's frustration with Compact control of the government was a catalyst for the failed Upper Canada Rebellion of 1837. Their hold on the government was reduced with the creation of the united Province of Canada and later the installation of the system of Responsible Government in Canada.

=== Colborne Clique ===
The Colborne Clique, named for John Colborne, 1st Baron Seaton, was a federation united by geography in Goderich, Scottish heritage, time of immigration to Upper Canada, and an association with the Dunlop brothers William "Tiger" Dunlop and Robert Graham Dunlop. Although their prime animosity was towards the Canada Company, the Canada Company and the Family Compact were seen as one and the same thing causing the Colbornites to align themselves firmly against the Family Compact.

Members:

- John Galt Jr.
- William Tiger Dunlop
- Robert Graham Dunlop
- Henry H. Hyndman
- Anthony Van Egmond
- William Dickson
- John Longworth
- David Clark

== Post-Rebellion decline ==
After the Rebellions of 1837, Lord Durham was sent to Canada to make recommendations on reform. Durham's Report on the Affairs of British North America states that it is impossible "To understand how any English statesman could have ever imagined that representative and irresponsible government could be successfully combined."

Nonetheless, rather than pursue the Reformers' dream of responsible government, the British imposed the Union of the Canadas. The aim of the new Governor General, Charles Poulett Thomson, was to strengthen the power of the Governor General, to minimize the impact of the numerically superior French vote, and to build a "middle party" that answered to him, rather than the Family Compact or the Reformers. Thomson was a Whig who believed in rational government, not "responsible government". But he was also intent on marginalizing the influence of the Family Compact.

The Family Compact began to reconfigure itself after 1841 as it was squeezed out of public life in the new Province of Canada. The conservative values of the Family Compact was succeeded by the Upper Canada Tories after 1841. The current Canadian establishment grew out of the Family Compact. Although the families and names changed, the basic template for power and control remained the same through to the end of World War II. With greater immigration from a variety of nations and cultures came the meritocracy so desired during the early years of Upper Canada.

However, as Canadian sociologist John Porter noted in the 1960s, a form of Family Compact in Canadian business and politics is to be expected.

Canada is probably not unlike other western industrial nations in relying heavily on its elite groups to make major decisions and to determine the shape and direction of its development. The nineteenth-century notion of a liberal citizen-participating democracy is obviously not a satisfactory model by which to examine the processes of decision-making in either the economic or the political contexts. ... If power and decision-making must always rest with elite groups, there can at least be open recruitment from all classes into the elite.

== General and cited references ==
- John G. Bourinot. Canada Under British Rule 1790—1900. Toronto, Copp, Clark Company, 1901.
- Patrick Brode. Sir John Beverley Robinson: Bone and Sinew of the Compact, 1984.
- G. M. Craig. Upper Canada: The Formative Years, 1784–1841 (1963).
- Donald Creighton. John A. Macdonald: The Young Politician. Toronto: Macmillan & Co. 1952.
- David W. L. Earl, ed. The Family Compact: Aristocracy or Oligarchy?, 1967.
- A. Ewart and J. Jarvis, Canadian Historical Review, The Personnel of the Family Compact 1926.
- David Gagan. "Property and 'Interest'; Some Preliminary Evidence of Land Speculation by the 'Family Compact' in Upper Canada 1820–1840," Ontario History, March 1978, Vol. 70 Issue 1, pp. 63–70.
- Robert C. Lee. The Canada Company and the Huron Tract, 1826—1853: Personalities, Profits and Politics Toronto: Natural Heritage Books, 2004.
- Kathleen Macfarlane Lizars. In the Days of the Canada Company: The Story of the Settlement of the Huron Tract and a view of the Social Life of the Period, 1825—1850. Nabu Public Domain Reprints.
- David Mills. Idea of Loyalty in Upper Canada, 1784–1850. 1988. ISBN 0-7735-0660-8.
- Gilbert Parker and Claude G. Bryan. Old Quebec. London: Macmillan & Co. 1903.
- Graeme Patterson. An Enduring Canadian Myth: Responsible Government and the Family Compact. 1989.
- W. Stewart Wallace. The Family Compact (Toronto, 1915).
- W. Stewart Wallace, ed., The Encyclopedia of Canada, Vol. II, Toronto, University Associates of Canada, 1948, p. 318.
