= History of Ontario =

The history of Ontario covers the period from the arrival of Paleo-Indians thousands of years ago to the present day. The lands that make up present-day Ontario, the most populous province of Canada as of the early 21st century have been inhabited for millennia by groups of Aboriginal people, with French and British exploration and colonization commencing in the 17th century. Before the arrival of Europeans, the region was inhabited both by Algonquian (Ojibwa, Cree and Algonquin) and Iroquoian (Haudenosaunee, Petun and Wendat (Huron)) tribes.

French explorer Étienne Brûlé surveyed part of the area in 1610–12. The English explorer Henry Hudson sailed into Hudson Bay in 1611 and claimed the area for England, but Samuel de Champlain reached Lake Huron in 1615. In their effort to secure the North American fur trade, the English / British and the French established a number of fur trading forts in Ontario during the 17th and 18th centuries; with the former establishing a number of forts around Hudson Bay, and the latter establishing forts throughout the Pays d'en Haut region. Control over the area remained contested until the end of the Seven Years' War, when the 1763 Treaty of Paris awarded the colony of New France to the British.

Following the American Revolutionary War, the province saw an influx of loyalists settle the area. In response to the influx of loyalist refugees, the Constitutional Act of 1791 was enacted, splitting the colony of Quebec into Lower Canada (present day southern Quebec) and Upper Canada (present day southern Ontario). The Canadas were reunited as the Province of Canada by the Act of Union 1840. On July 1, 1867, the Province of Canada, New Brunswick, and Nova Scotia were united to form a single federation. The Province of Canada was split into two provinces at Confederation, with the area east of the Ottawa River forming Quebec, and the area west of the river forming Ontario.

== Initial settlement and Archaic period ==
Paleo-Indians were the first people to settle on the lands of Ontario, about 11,000 years ago, after crossing the Bering land bridge from Asia to North America between 25,000 and 50,000 years ago. During the Archaic period, which lasted from 8000 to 1000 BC, the population slowly increased, with a generally egalitarian hunter-gatherer society and a warmer climate. Trading routes also began emerging along the St. Lawrence River and around the Great Lakes.

== Woodland period ==
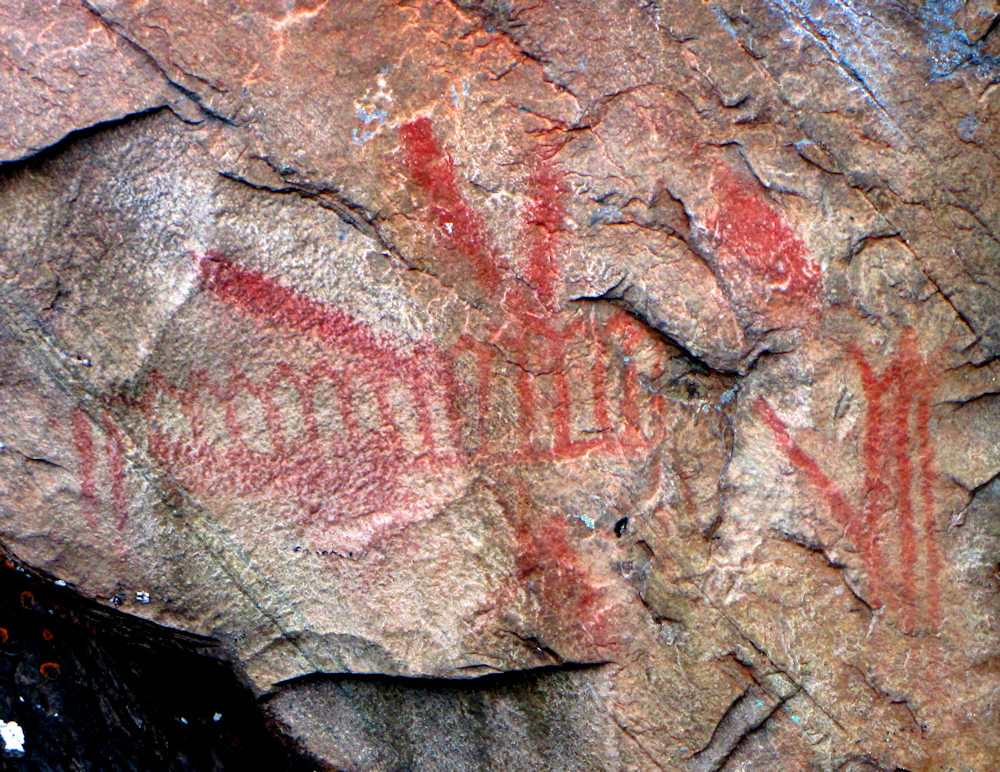
Pictographs on Mazinaw Rock in Bon Echo Provincial Park, eastern Ontario.

The Woodland period directly followed the Archaic period. It saw the introduction of ceramics in the Early Woodland period, horticultural experimentation with different crops (notably maize, or corn) as well as elaborate burial ceremonialism during the Middle Woodland, and the emergence of agriculture and village settlements by the Late Woodland. Especially by the Late Woodland, there was a divergence between northern and southern Ontario, as agriculture only took place in southern Ontario. However, northern Ontario saw significant changes in pottery and a continuation of mound building practices. Pictographs are associated with the Late Woodland, and continue as a practice into the time following European arrival, with the appearance of pictographs representing horses, firearms, and ships.

By at least the latter part of the Woodland period, a number of indigenous societies formed a broad fabric of ethnic groups, some of which were politically organized as confederacies. In the territory of modern-day Ontario, examples of these include the interconnected Wendat, Petun, and Neutral confederacies. These Northern Iroquoian peoples were more distantly related to the Haudenosaunee Confederacy to the south. The territory was also inhabited by Algonquian peoples such as the Ojibwe, Cree, and Algonquin.

== Pays d'en Haut ==
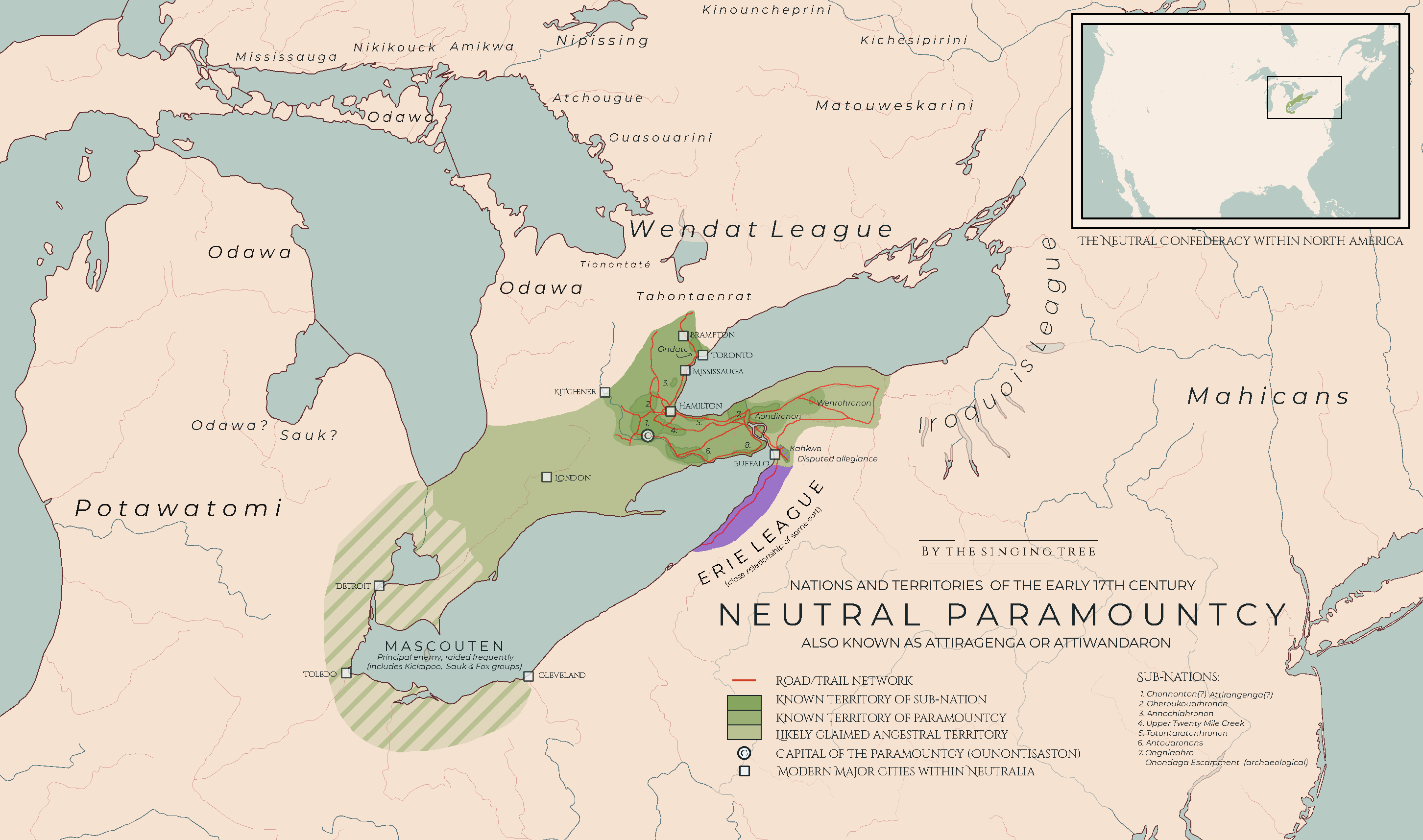
Map of the Neutral Confederacy in 1600

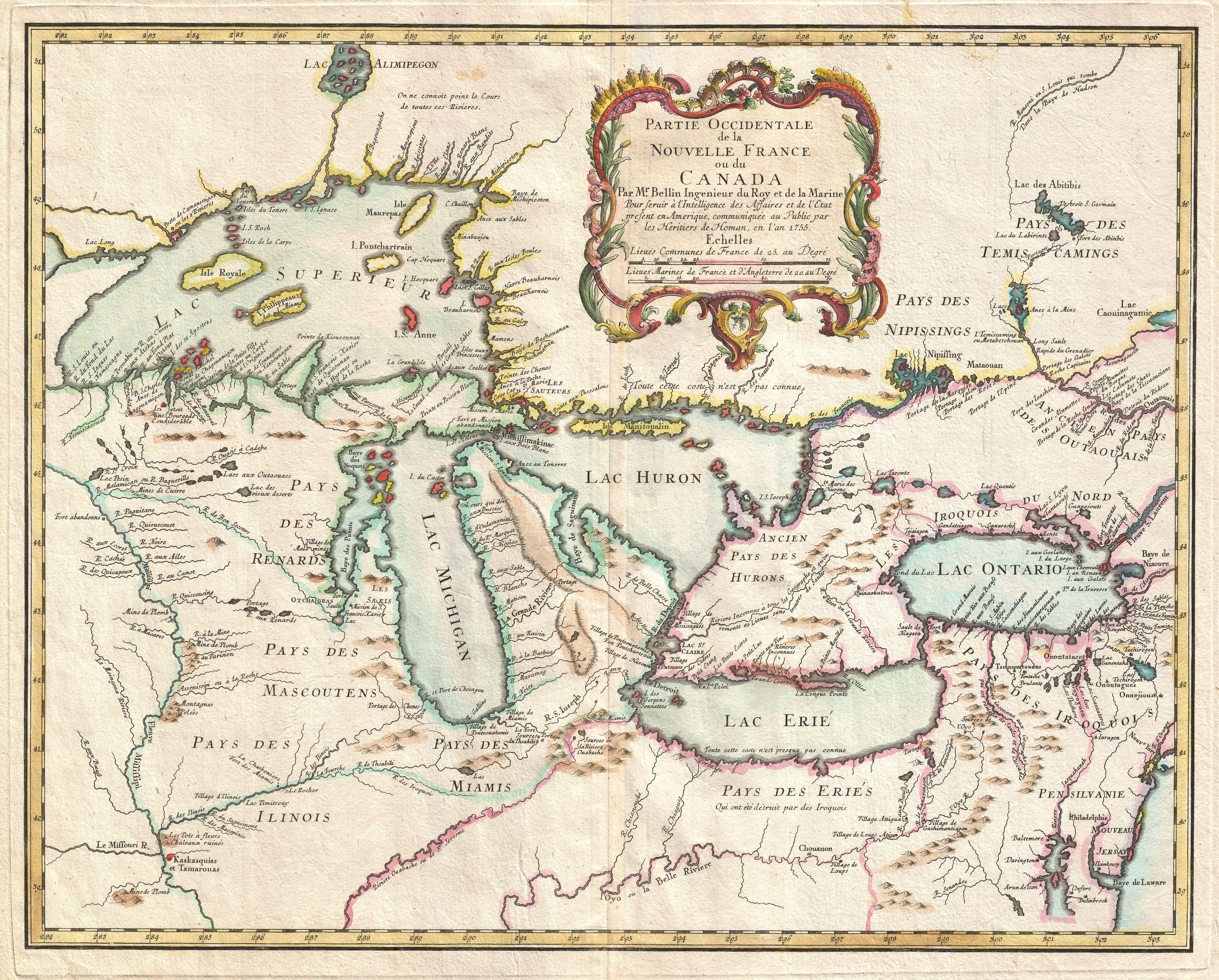
A 1755 map of the Pays d'en Haut region of New France, an area that included most of Ontario

French explorer Étienne Brûlé surveyed part of the area in 1610–12. The English explorer Henry Hudson sailed into Hudson Bay in 1611 and claimed the area for England, but Samuel de Champlain reached Lake Huron in 1615. French Jesuit missionaries began to establish posts along the Great Lakes, forging alliances in particular with the Wendat people. Permanent French settlement was hampered by their hostilities with the Five Nations of the Haudenosaunee (based in New York State), who became allied with the British. By the early 1650s, using both British and Dutch arms, they had succeeded in pushing other related Iroquoian-speaking peoples, the Petun and Neutral Nation, out of or to the fringes of territorial southern Ontario. In 1747 a small number of French settlers established the oldest continually inhabited European community in what became western Ontario; Petite Côte was settled on the south bank of the Detroit River across from Fort Detroit and near Wendat and Petun villages.

The British established trading posts on Hudson Bay in the late 17th century.

== Province of Quebec ==
With their victory in the Seven Years' War, the 1763 Treaty of Paris gave nearly all of France's North American possessions (New France) to Britain. Lands like Canada and the Pays d'en Haut were bundled together and renamed the Province of Quebec after the city of Quebec. The first English settlements in what is today Ontario occurred in 1782–1784 in Thousand Islands and the Niagara Peninsula, where 5,000 American loyalists who fled the American Revolution settled. From 1783 to 1796, Britain granted individuals 200 acres (0.8 km^{2}) of land per household and other items as compensation for their losses in the Thirteen Colonies and a start for rebuilding their lives.

== Upper Canada ==
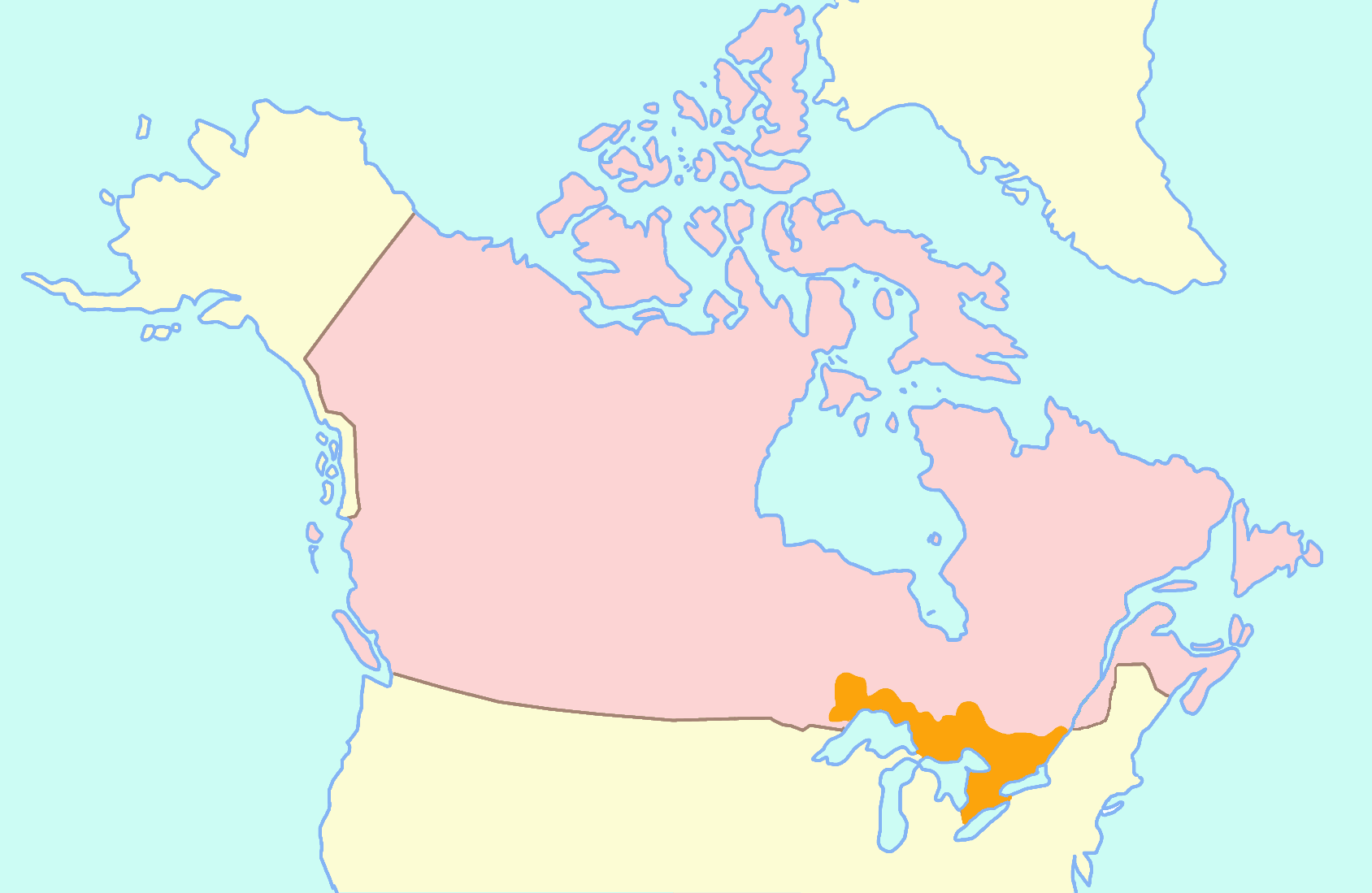
Upper Canada in orange

The Constitutional Act of 1791 recognized that development by splitting the Province of Quebec into the Canadas. Lower Canada was east of the St. Lawrence-Ottawa River confluence, the area of earliest settlement, and Upper Canada became what was southwest of the confluence. John Graves Simcoe was appointed Upper Canada's first Lieutenant-Governor in 1793.

=== War of 1812 ===
Owing to grievances from the impressment of American sailors by the British, and suspected British support of Native Americans in the American Northwest Territory, the United States declared war on the United Kingdom on July 1, 1812. Given its proximity to the United States, colonies in British North America, including Upper Canada found itself an active theatre of war throughout most of the conflict.

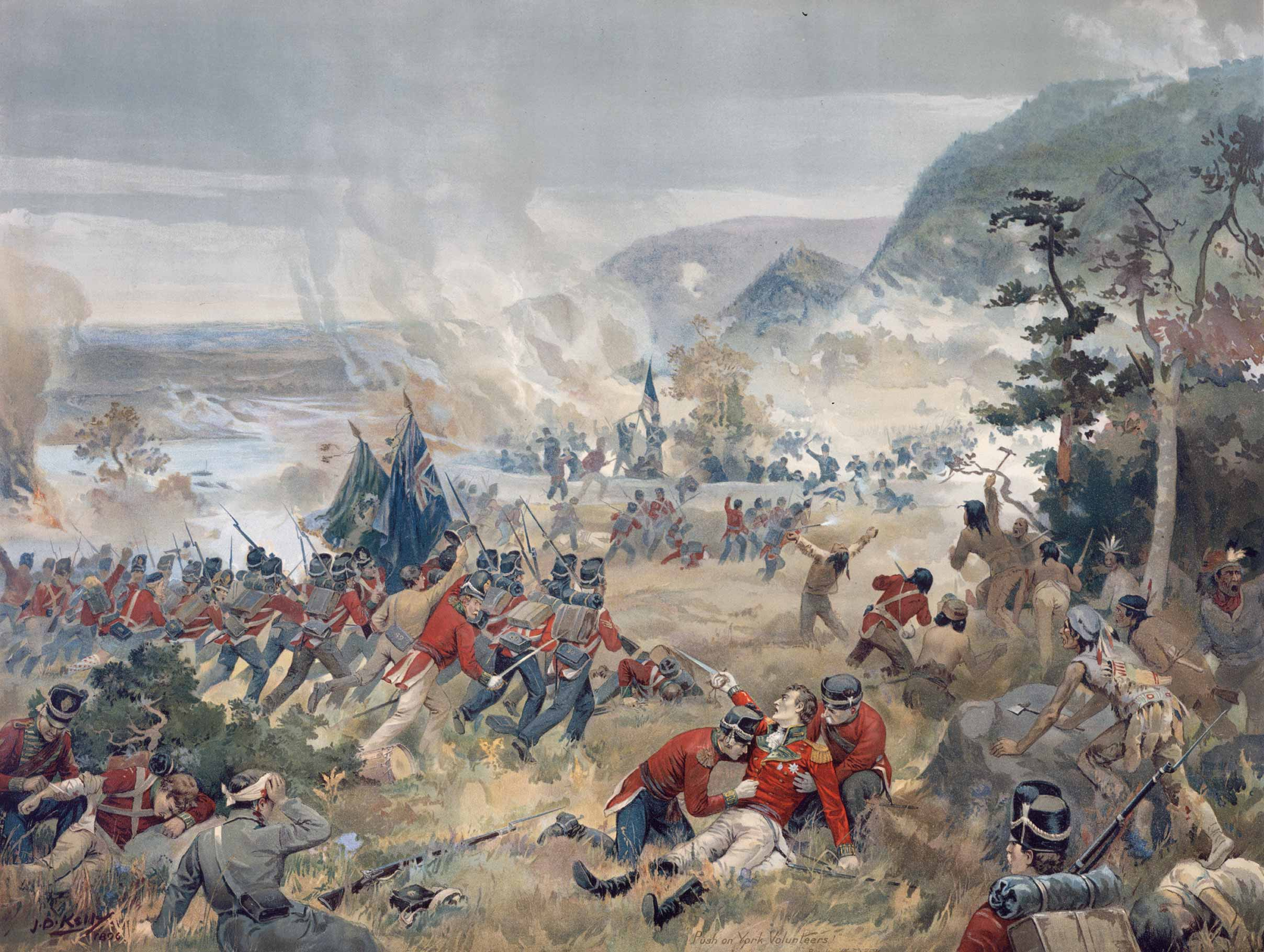
Depiction of the Battle of Queenston Heights, during the War of 1812. Upper Canada was an active theatre of operation during the conflict.

The earliest offensives of the war took place near what is now Southwestern Ontario and the upper Great Lakes region, with American forces briefly crossing into present day southwestern Ontario, before a British-First Nations force launched an offensive into the Michigan Territory. However, on September 10, 1813, after the Americans gained control of Lake Erie, British forces evacuated Detroit, and eventually decided to withdraw from the entire area. American forces under William Henry Harrison caught up to the retreating British-First Nations force, decisively defeating them at the Battle of the Thames. Tecumseh, leader of a Native American confederation, was killed shortly after the remaining British forces decided to fall back to Burlington; disrupting the military alliance between British and First Nations.

Several invasion attempts by American forces were also attempted at the Niagara Peninsula. On October 13, 1812, an American invasion attempt was prevented at the Battle of Queenston Heights; although the commander of British forces in Upper Canada, Major-General Isaac Brock, was killed during the battle. On April 27, 1813, American forces raided and briefly occupied York, the capital of Upper Canada. A month later, American forces captured Fort George prompting the British to retreat to the Burlington Heights. However, further advances into the peninsula by American forces were halted at the battles of Stoney Creek and Beaver Dams; prompting the Americans to eventual withdraw from the peninsula on December 10, 1813. An American invasion force advancing towards Montreal was also repulsed at the Battle of Chrysler's Farm on November 13, 1813.

In the summer of 1814, the Americans conducted another invasion of the Niagara Peninsula, successfully defeating the British at the Battle of Chippewa. However, American forces were prompted to withdraw to Fort Erie following the Battle of Lundy's Lane on July 25, 1814. American forces managed to repulse a British siege of the fort, although the Americans evacuated the fort shortly after the siege was over in November 1814. Transgressions conducted by American occupying forces while in Upper Canada, including the burning of York and the raid on Port Dover later influenced the actions of British commanders in other theatres of the war, most notably the burning of Buffalo and Washington. The conflict was concluded in December 1814 with the signing of the Treaty of Ghent.

=== Transportation ===
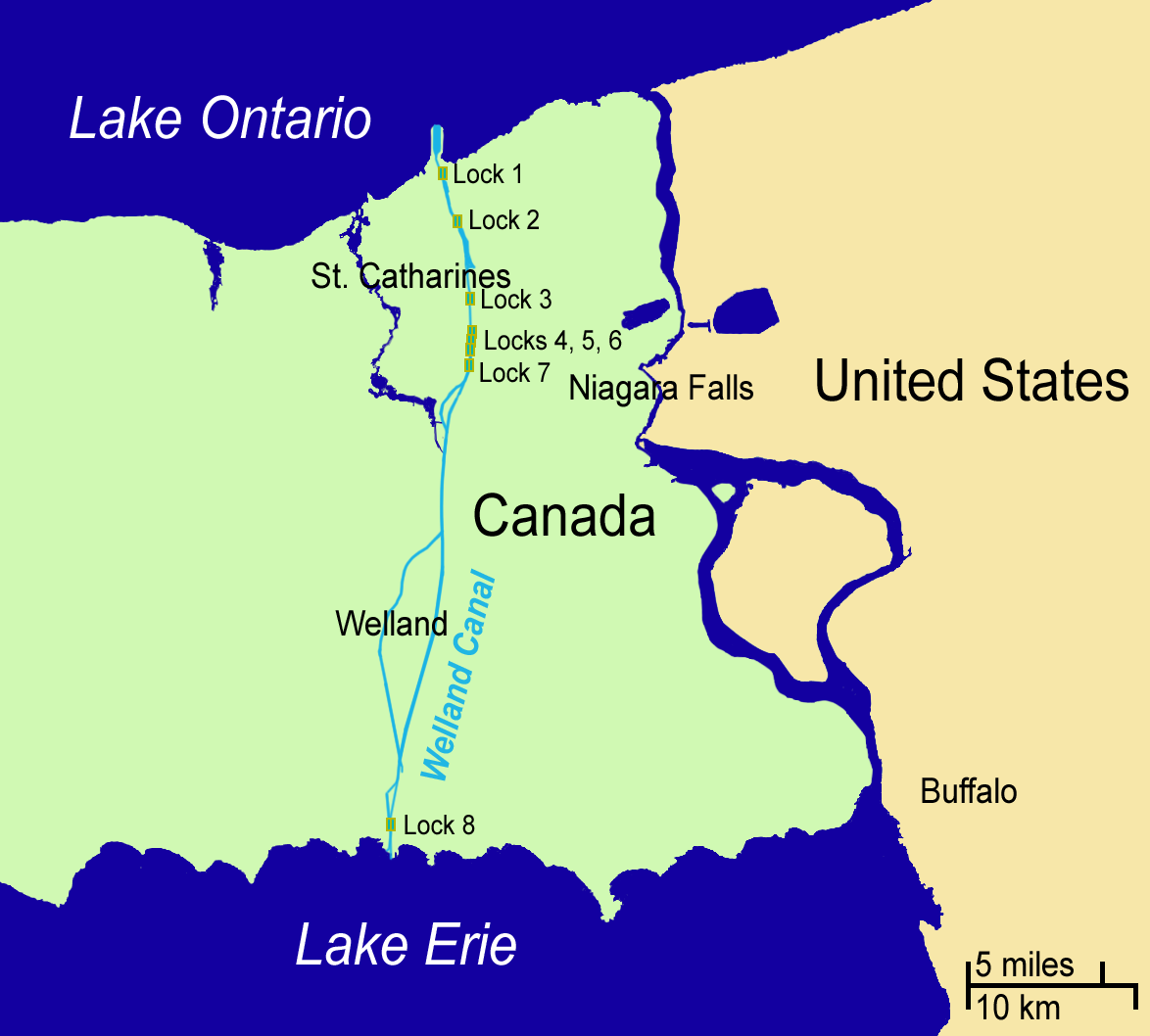
The Welland canal around Niagara Falls has been modernized often since it opened in 1829.

After the War of 1812, the relative stability attracted increasing numbers of immigrants from Britain and Ireland rather than from the United States. Colonial leaders encouraged the new immigration. However, many arriving newcomers from Europe (mostly from Britain and Ireland) found frontier life difficult, and some of those with the means eventually returned home or went south. However, population growth far exceeded emigration from this area in the following decades.

Canal projects and a new network of plank roads spurred greater trade within the colony and with the United States, thereby improving relations over time. Ontario's numerous waterways aided travel and transportation into the interior and supplied water power for development. Canals were capital-intensive infrastructure projects that facilitated trade. The Oswego Canal, built in New York 1825–1829, was a vital commercial link in the Great Lakes–Atlantic seaway. It was connected to Ontario's Welland Canal in 1829. The newly fashioned Oswego–Welland line offered an alternate route to the St. Lawrence River and Europe, as opposed to the Erie Canal, which connected the Great Lakes to New York City via the Mohawk and Hudson rivers.

=== Family Compact ===
In the absence of a hereditary aristocracy, Upper Canada was run by an oligarchy or closed group of powerful men who controlled most of the political, judicial, and economic power from the 1810s to the 1830s. Opponents called it the "Family Compact", but its members avoided the term. In the religious sphere, a key leader was John Strachan (1778–1867), the Anglican bishop of Toronto. Strachan (and the Family Compact generally) was opposed by Methodist leader Egerton Ryerson (1803–1882). The Family Compact consisted of English gentry who arrived before 1800, and the sons of United Empire Loyalists, who were exiles who fled the American revolution. The term "family" was metaphorical, for they generally were not related by blood or marriage. There were no elections and the leadership controlled appointments, so local officials were generally allies of the leaders.

The Family Compact looked to Britain for the ideal model of society, where landed aristocrats held power. The Family Compact was noted for its conservatism and opposition to democracy, especially the rowdy United States version. They developed the theme that they and their militia had defeated American attempts to annex Canada in the War of 1812. They were based in Toronto and were integrated with the bankers, merchants, and financiers of the city, who were active in promoting canals and railroads.

=== Upper Canada Rebellion ===
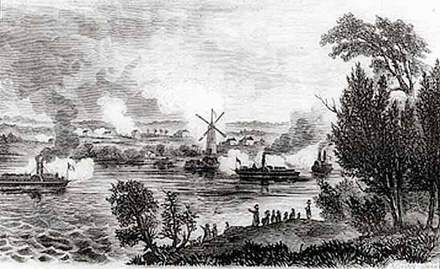
British forces and the Canadian militia defeated an invasion attempt by a Hunters' Lodges paramilitary unit based in the United States.

Many men chafed against the anti-democratic Family Compact that governed through personal connections among the elite, which controlled the best lands. This resentment spurred republican ideals and sowed the seeds for early Canadian nationalism. Accordingly, rebellion in favour of responsible government rose in both regions; Louis-Joseph Papineau led the Lower Canada Rebellion and William Lyon Mackenzie led the Upper Canada Rebellion. The rebellions failed but there were long-term changes that resolved the issue.

== Canada West ==
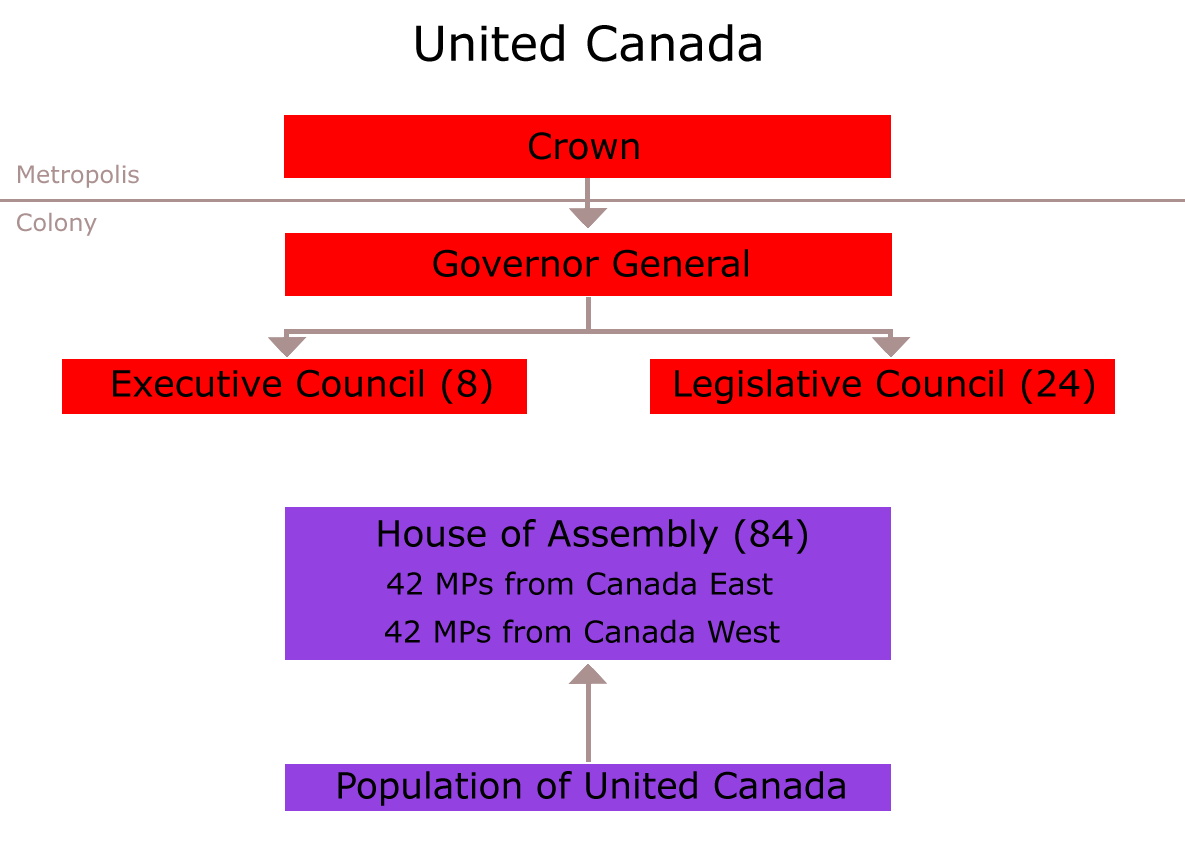
Political organization of the Province of Canada under the Act of Union, 1840. The Act of Union united the Canadas into a single colony

Although both rebellions were put down in short order, the British government sent Lord Durham to investigate the causes of the unrest. He recommended that self-government be granted and that Lower and Upper Canada be rejoined in an attempt to assimilate the French Canadians. Accordingly, the two colonies were merged into the Province of Canada by the Act of Union (1840), with the capital at Kingston, and Upper Canada becoming known as Canada West. Parliamentary self-government was granted in 1848.

Waves of increased immigration in the 1840s made the population of Canada West more than double by 1851 over the previous decade. As a result, for the first time, the English-speaking population of Canada West surpassed the French-speaking population of Canada East, which tilted the representative balance of power.

An economic boom in the 1850s, brought on by factors such as a free trade agreement with the United States and massive railway expansion across the province, furthered the economic strength of what is now Central Canada.

== Confederation and the late-19th century ==
A political stalemate between the French- and English-speaking legislators, as well as the fear of annedxation by the United States because British policy during the American Civil War, led the political elite to hold a series of conferences in the 1860s to effect a broader federal union of all British North American colonies. The British North America Act (BNA Act), which came into effect on July 1, 1867. established the Dominion of Canada, initially with four provinces: Nova Scotia, New Brunswick, Quebec, and Ontario. The Province of Canada was divided then into Ontario and Quebec to give a French-speaking province.

Both Quebec and Ontario were required by section 93 of the BNA Act to safeguard existing educational rights and privileges of the relative Protestant and Catholic minorities. Thus, separate Catholic schools and school boards were permitted in Ontario. However, neither province had a constitutional requirement to protect its French- or English-speaking minority. Toronto was then formally established as Ontario's provincial capital.

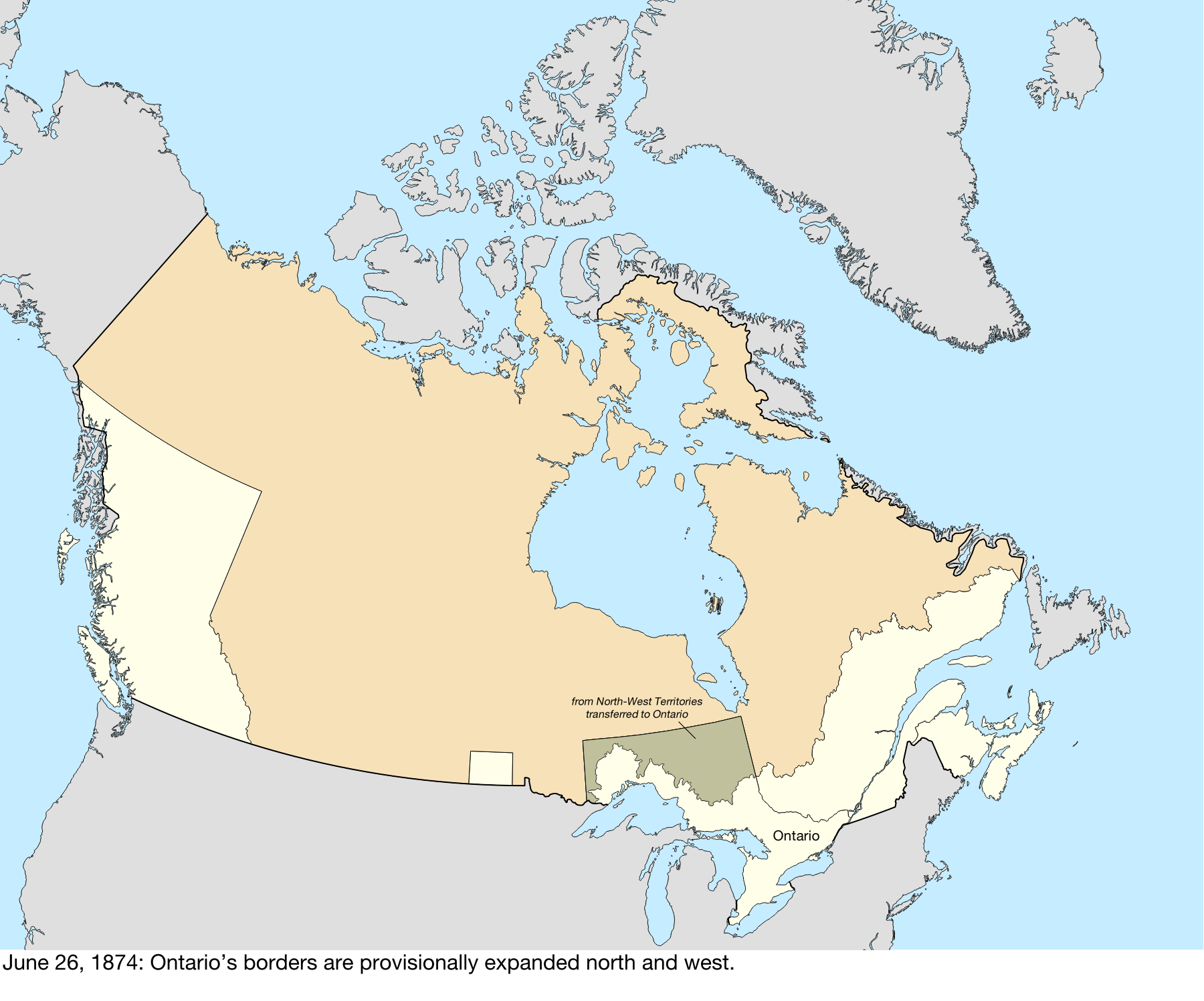
The boundary of the provinces of Canada in 1874, with the grey-shaded areas added into Ontario

Once constituted as a province, Ontario proceeded to assert its economic and legislative power. In 1872, the Liberal Party leader, Oliver Mowat, became premier, and remained as premier until 1896, despite Conservative control in Ottawa. Mowat fought for provincial rights, weakening the power of the federal government in provincial matters, usually through well-argued appeals to the Judicial Committee of the Privy Council. His battles with the federal government greatly decentralized Canada, giving the provinces far more power than Prime Minister John A. Macdonald had intended.

Mowat consolidated and expanded Ontario's educational and provincial institutions, created districts in Northern Ontario, and fought tenaciously to ensure that those parts of Northwestern Ontario not historically part of Upper Canada (the vast areas north and west of the Lake Superior-Hudson Bay watershed, known as the District of Keewatin) would become part of Ontario, a victory embodied in the Canada (Ontario Boundary) Act, 1889. He also presided over the emergence of the province into the economic powerhouse of Canada. Mowat was the creator of what is often called Empire Ontario.

The boundary between Ontario and Manitoba became a hotly contested matter, with the federal government attempting to extend Manitoba's jurisdiction eastward to the Great Lakes, into the areas claimed by Ontario. In 1882, Mowat threatened to pull Ontario from Confederation over the issue. Mowat sent police into the disputed territory to assert Ontario's claims, while Manitoba (at the behest of the national government) did the same. London's Judicial Committee of the Privy Council, which then served as Canada's highest appeal court, repeatedly issued rulings taking the side of provincial rights. Those decisions would to some extent neutralize the power of the central government and create a more decentralized federation.

John Ibbitson writes that by 1914:

Confederation had evolved into a creation beyond John A. Macdonald's worst nightmare. Powerful, independent provinces, sovereign within their own spheres, manipulated the rights of property, levied their own taxes—even income taxes, in a few cases—exploited their natural resources, and managed schools, hospitals, and relief for the poor, while a weak and ineffectual central government presided over not much of anything in the drab little capital on the banks of the Ottawa.

Meanwhile, the leader of the Ontario Conservative Party, William Ralph Meredith, had difficulty balancing the province's particular interests with his national party's centralism. Meredith was further undercut by lack of support from the national Conservative party and his own elitist aversion to popular politics at the provincial level.

In the 1894 election, the main issues were the Liberals' "Ontario System," as well as opposition to French language schools and a rise in anti-Catholicism, led by the Protestant Protective Association (PPA)); farmer interests as expressed by the new Patrons of Industry; support for Toronto business, woman suffrage, and the temperance movement; and the demands of labour unions. Mowat's Liberals maintained their large majority in the assembly.

=== Economic development ===
==== Transportation ====
As the population increased, so did the industries and transportation networks, which in turn led to further development. By the end of the 19th century, Ontario vied with Quebec as the nation's leader in terms of growth in population, industry, arts, and communications.

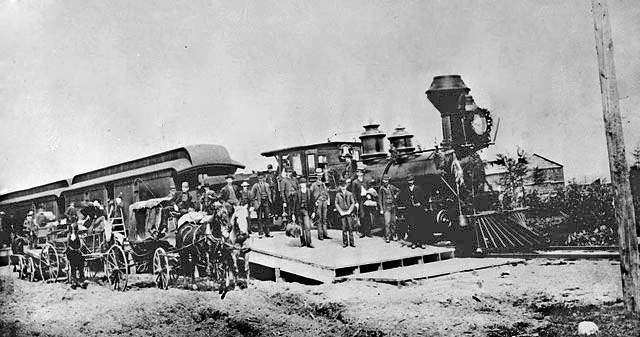
First Canadian Pacific Railway train making its way from the Atlantic to Pacific Ocean at Port Arthur

Ontario large manufacturing and finance sectors waxed profitable in the late 19th century. Lucrative new markets opened up nationwide thanks to the federal government's high-tariff National Policy after 1879, which limited competition from the United States. New markets out west opened after construction of the Canadian Pacific Railway (1875–1885) through Northern Ontario to the Prairies and British Columbia. Tens of thousands of European immigrants, as well as native Canadians, moved west along the railroad to acquire land and set up new farms. They shipped their wheat east and bought from local merchants who placed orders with Ontario wholesalers, especially those based in Toronto.

==== Farming ====
Farming was generally quite profitable, especially after 1896. The major changes involved mechanization of technology and a shift toward high-profit, high-quality consumer products, such as milk, eggs, and vegetables, for the fast-growing urban markets. It took farmers a half century to appreciate the value of high-protein soybean crops. Introduced in the 1890s, acceptance was slow until 1943–52, when farmers in the southwestern counties expanded production. Farmers increasingly demanded more information on the best farming techniques. Their demands led to farm magazine and agricultural fairs. In 1868 the assembly created an agricultural museum, which developed as the Ontario Agricultural College in Guelph in 1874.

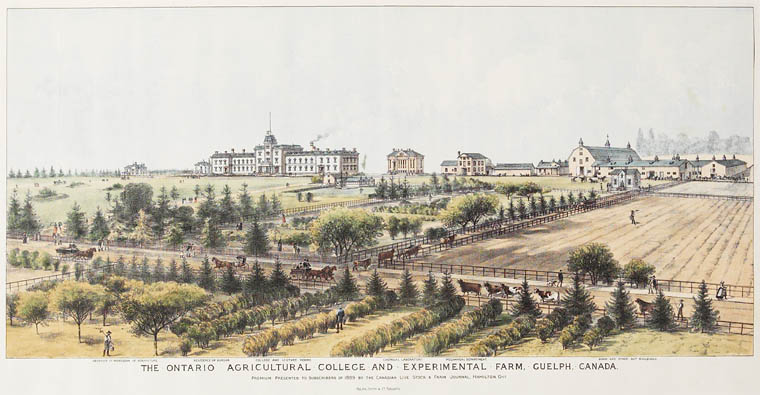
Ontario Agricultural College and the experimental farm in Guelph, 1889

Commercial wine production in the province began in the 1860s with an aristocrat from France, Count Justin McCarthy De Courtenay in County Peel. His success followed the realization that the right grapes could grow in the cold climate, producing an inexpensive good wine that could reach a commercial market. He gained government support and raised the capital for a commercial-scale vineyard and winery. His financial success encouraged others to enter the business.

==== Social welfare ====
The care of illegitimate children was a high priority for private charities. Before 1893, the Ontario government appropriated grants to charitable infants' homes for the infants and for their nursing mothers. Most of those infants were illegitimate, and most of their mothers were poor. Many babies were admitted to the homes in poor physical condition, so that their chances of survival outside such homes was poor.

=== Culture ===
==== Religion ====
The changes in the next generation in the town of Woodstock in southwestern Ontario exemplified the shift of power from the Tory elite to middle-class merchants and professionals. The once-unquestioned leadership of the magistracy and the Anglican Church, with their closed interlocking networks of patron-client relations, faded year by year as modern ideas of respectability based on merit and economic development grew apace. The new middle class was solidly in control by the 1870s, and the old elite had all but vanished.

While the Anglicans consolidated their hold on the upper classes, workingmen and farmers responded to the Methodist revivals, often sponsored by visiting preachers from the United States. Typical was Rev. James Caughey, an American sent by the Wesleyan Methodist Church from the 1840s to 1864. He brought in the converts by the score, most notably in the revivals in Canada West 1851–53. His technique combined restrained emotionalism with a call for personal commitment, coupled with follow-up action to organize support from converts. It was a time when the Holiness Movement caught fire, with the revitalized interest of men and women in Christian perfection. Caughey bridged the gap between the style of earlier camp meetings and the needs of more sophisticated Methodist congregations in the emerging cities.

==== Sport and recreation ====
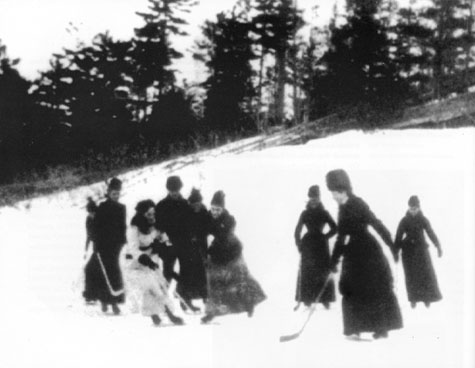
Women playing ice hockey, with Lady Stanley, the daughter of Lord Stanley, c. 1888–93

Travellers commented on the class differentials in recreation, contrasting the gentrified masculinity of the British middle class and the rough-and-ready bush masculinity of the workers. Working-class audiences responded to cockfights, boxing matches, wrestling, and animal baiting. That was too bloody for gentlemen and army officers, who favoured games that promoted honour and built character. Middle-class sports, especially lacrosse and snowshoeing, evolved from military training. Ice hockey proved a success among both refined gentlemen and bloodthirsty labourers.

The ideals promulgated by the English author and reformer Thomas Hughes, especially as expressed in Tom Brown's Schooldays (1857), gave the middle class a model for sports that provided moral education and training for citizenship. Late in the 19th century, the Social Gospel themes of muscular Christianity were influential, as in the invention of basketball in 1891 by James Naismith, an Ontarian employed at the International Young Men's Christian Association Training School in Massachusetts. Outside of sports, the social and moral agendas behind muscular Christianity influenced numerous reform movements, thus linking it to the political left in Canada.

=== Medicine ===
Numerous local rivalries had to be overcome before physicians could form a single, self-regulating, and unified medical body for licensing and educating practitioners. Professionalization began with the first medical board in 1818, and an 1827 act that required all doctors to be licensed. From the 1840s on, the number of new doctors with medical degrees increased rapidly because of legislation and the establishment of local medical schools. The Ontario College of Physicians and Surgeons was chartered in 1869.

As physicians became better organized, they gained passage of laws controlling the practice of medicine and pharmacy, and banning marginal and traditional practitioners. Midwifery, practised along traditional lines by women, was restricted and had practically died out by 1900. Even so, the great majority of childbirths took place at home until the 1920s, when hospitals became preferred, especially by women who were better educated, wealthier and more modern, and more trusting of modern medicine.

== 20th century Ontario ==
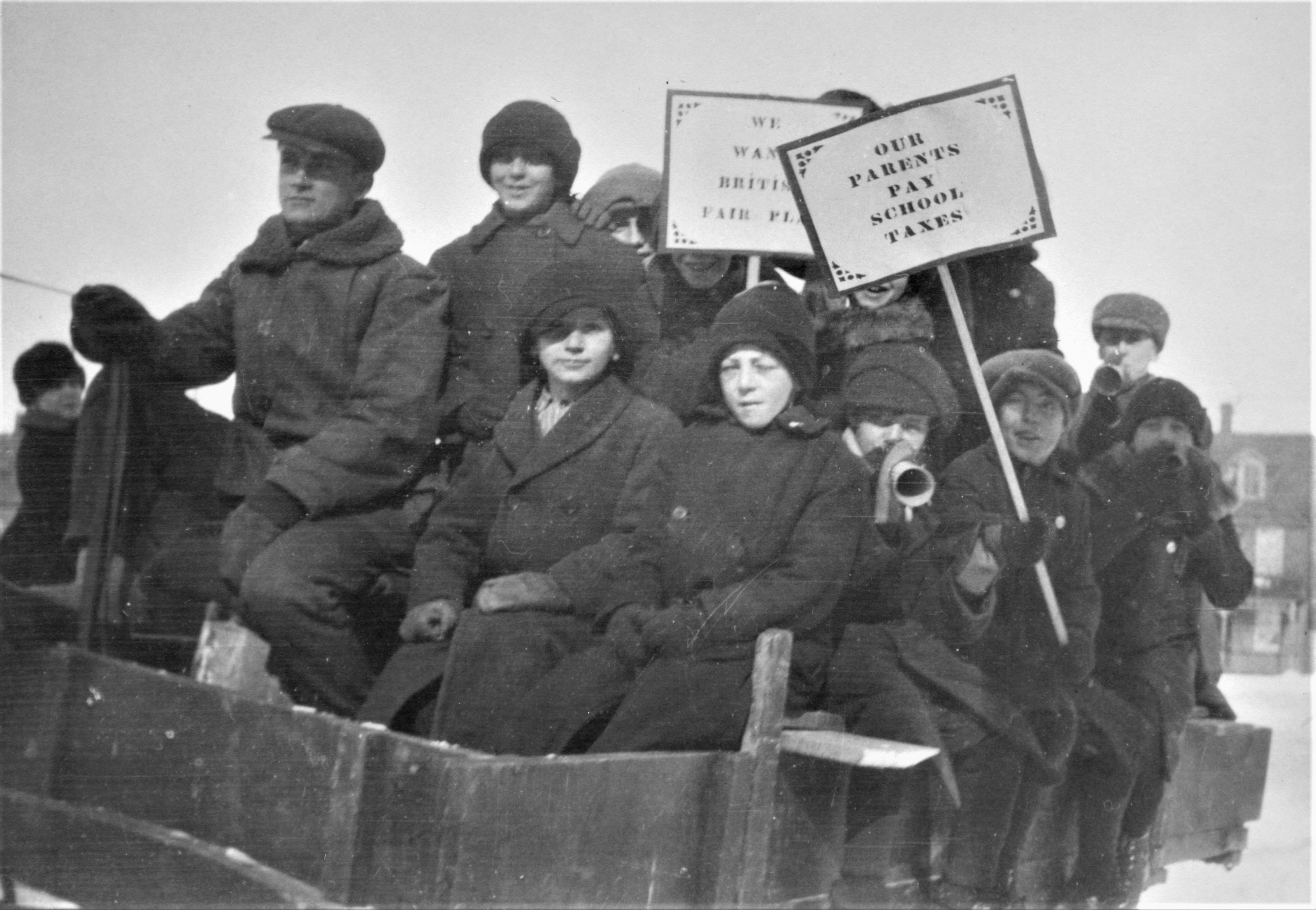
Franco-Ontarians protesting against Regulation 17, 1916. The regulation was in place from 1912 to 1927, prohibiting French-language instruction in Ontario schools.

In 1912, Regulation 17 was a regulation introduced by the government of Ontario designed to shut down French-language schools at a time that Francophones from Quebec were moving into eastern Ontario. In July 1912, the Conservative government of Sir James P. Whitney issued Regulation 17, which severely limited the provision of French-language schooling to the province's French-speaking minority. French could only be used in the first two years of schooling, and after that students and teachers were required to use English in classrooms. Few of the teachers at the French-language schools were fluent in English, so the schools had to close. The French-Canadian population, which was growing rapidly in eastern Ontario from migration, reacted with outrage; journalist Henri Bourassa denounced the "Prussians of Ontario". With the Great War raging, Anglophones were insulted by the comparison. The restriction on French-language schools contributed to the Francophones turning away from the war effort in 1915 and refusing to enlist. However, most of Ontario's Catholics were Irish, led by Irish Bishop Fallon, who united with the Protestants in opposing French schools. The government repealed Regulation 17 in 1927. Ontario has no official language, but English is considered the de facto language. Numerous French-language services are available under the French Language Services Act of 1990 in designated areas where sizable francophone populations exist.

=== World War I ===
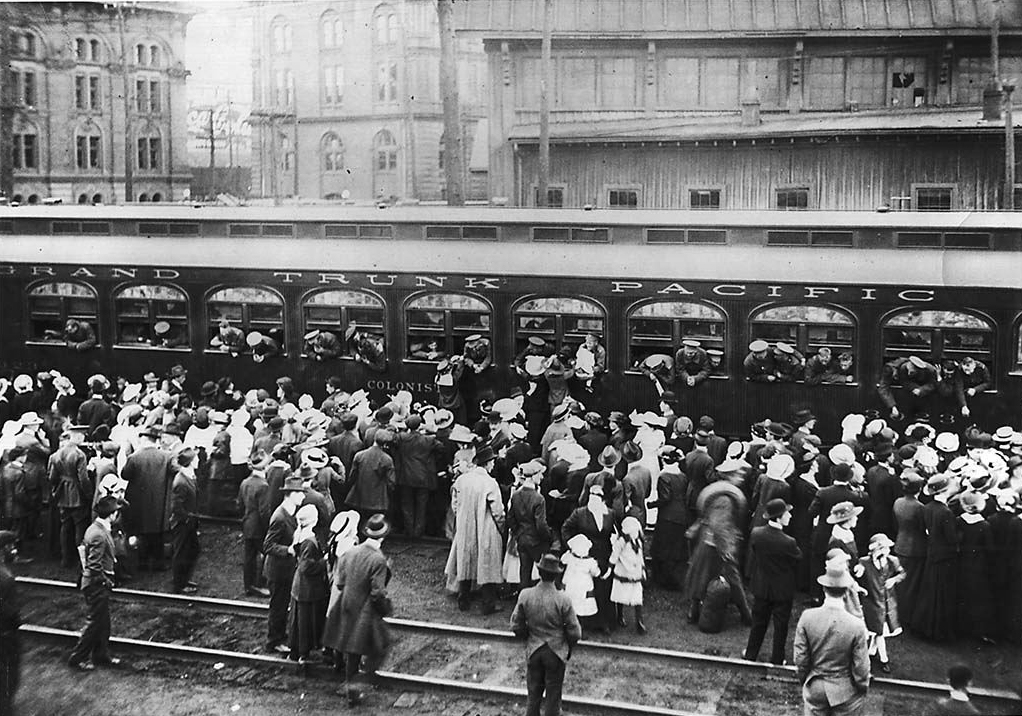
Crowds gather at Toronto's Union Station to bid farewell to soldiers departing for war, 1914

The British element strongly supported the war with men, money and enthusiasm. So too did the Francophone element until it reversed position in 1915. Since Germany was one of the Central Powers, the Canadian government was suspicious of the loyalty of residents of German descent, and anti-German sentiment escalated in the country. The City of Berlin was renamed Kitchener after Britain's top commander. Left-wing anti-war activists also came under attack. In 1917–1918, Isaac Bainbridge of Toronto, the Dominion Secretary of the Social Democratic Party of Canada and the editor of its newspaper, Canadian Forward, was charged three times with seditious libel and once with possession of seditious material; he was imprisoned twice.

=== 1920s ===
Premier Hearst had a number of progressive ideas planned for his next term, but his Conservatives were swept from power in 1919 by a totally new farmers' party, the United Farmers of Ontario. With 45 seats, it formed a bare-majority coalition with the trades union party, known as the "Ontario Independent Labour Party," with 11 seats. They selected the farm leader Ernest Drury as premier, enforced prohibition, passed a mothers' pension and minimum wage that Hearst had proposed, and promoted good roads in the rural areas. The farmers and unionists did not get along well. The 1923 election reflected a popular move to the right, with the Conservatives winning 50% of the vote and 75 seats of the 111 seats, making George Howard Ferguson premier.

When surveys of public health showed infant mortality rates were high in Ontario, particularly in the more rural and isolated areas, the provincial government teamed with middle-class public health reformers to take action. They launched an educational campaign to teach mothers to save and improve the lives of infants and young children, with the long-range goal of uplifting the average Canadian family.

==== Prohibition ====
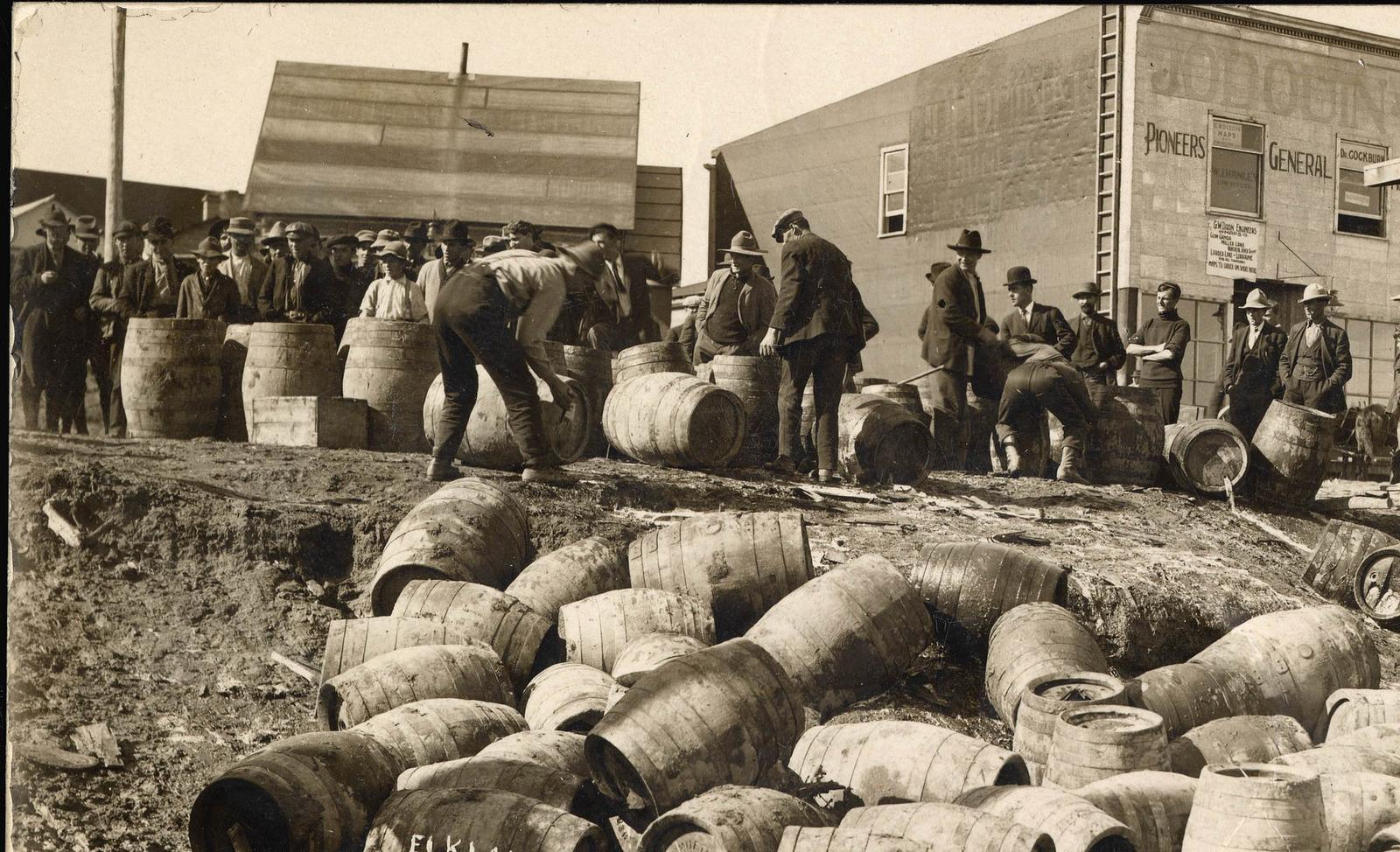
Law enforcement confiscate stores of alcohol in Elk Lake in an effort to enforce prohibition. The prohibition measures were introduced in 1916 and were not repealed until 1927.

Starting in the late 1870s the Ontario Woman's Christian Temperance Union (WCTU) urged public schools to teach "scientific temperance" as a compulsory subject; it reinforced moralistic messages with the study of anatomy and hygiene. Although the WCTU was initially successful in convincing the Ontario Department of Education to adopt scientific temperance as part of the curriculum, teachers opposed the plan and refused to implement it. The WCTU reacted with an attempt to reduce alcohol sales and use in the province through government action. They started with "local option" laws, which allowed local governments to prohibit the sale of liquor. Many towns and rural areas went dry in the years before 1914, but not the larger cities.

Anti-German sentiment after 1914 and the accession of the Conservatives' William Hearst to the premiership made prohibition a major political issue, as many residents associated beer production and drinking with Germans. The Methodists and Baptists (but not the Anglicans or Catholics) demanded the province be made dry. The government introduced prohibition of alcoholic sales in 1916 with the Ontario Temperance Act. However, drinking itself was never illegal, and residents could distill and retain their own personal supply. As major liquor producers could continue distillation and export for sale, Ontario became a centre for the illegal smuggling of liquor into the United States. The latter passed complete prohibition, effective after 1920. The "drys" won a referendum in 1919. Prohibition was ended in 1927 with the Conservative establishment of the Liquor Control Board of Ontario.

However, the government still controls the sale and consumption of liquor, wine, and beer to ensure compliance with strict community standards and to generate revenue from the alcohol retail monopoly. In April 2007, Ontario Minister of Provincial Parliament Kim Craitor suggested that local brewers should be able to sell their beer in local corner stores; however, the motion was quickly rejected by Premier Dalton McGuinty.

=== Great Depression ===
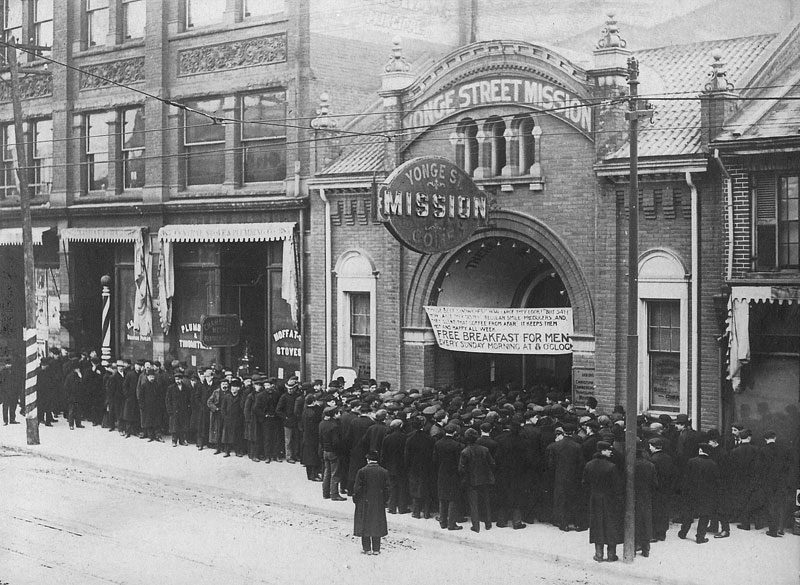
A food line forms during the Great Depression in Canada, c. 1930s

Agriculture and industry alike suffered in the Great Depression in Canada; hardest hit were the lumbering regions, the auto plants, and the steel mills. The milk industry suffered from price wars that hurt both dairy farmers and dairies. The government set up the Ontario Milk Control Board (MCB), which raised and stabilized prices through licensing, bonding, and fixed price agreements. The MCB resolved the crisis for the industry, but consumers complained loudly about higher prices. The government favoured producers over consumers as the industry rallied behind the MCB.

Following a massive defeat in 1934 by the Liberals, the Conservatives reorganized over the next decade. Led by pragmatic leaders Cecil Frost, George Drew, Alex McKenzie, and Fred Gardiner, they minimized internal conflicts, quietly dropped laissez-faire positions, and opted in favour of state intervention to deal with the Great Depression and encourage economic growth. The revised party declared loyalty to the Empire, called for comprehensive health care and pension programs, and sought more provincial autonomy. The reforms set the stage for a long run of election wins from 1943 onward.

=== Late 20th century ===
After World War II, Ontario grew more in population. The Greater Toronto Area in particular has been the destination of most immigration to Canada, largely immigrants from Europe in the 1950s and 1960s. After changes in federal immigration law in 1967, most immigrants come from Asia. In terms of ancestry, Ontario has changed from a largely ethnically British province, to one that is very diverse.

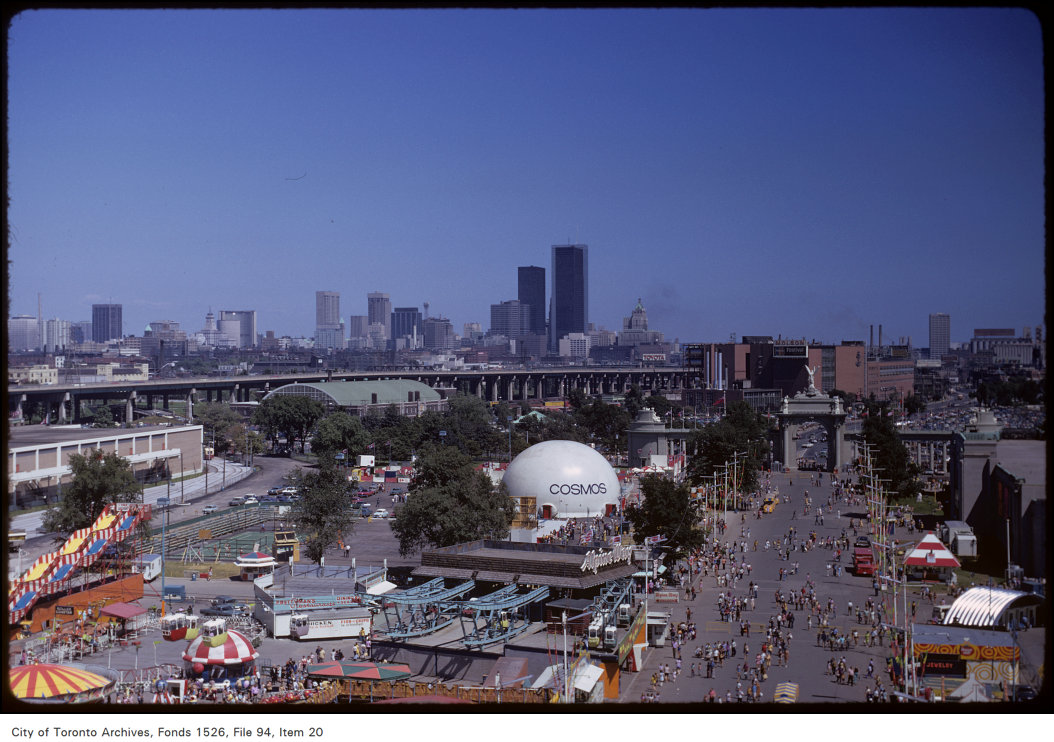
Skyline of Toronto in 1971. By the 1970s, the city had emerged as the financial capital of Canada

Toronto replaced Montreal as the nation's premier business centre because the nationalist movement in Quebec, particularly with the success of the Parti Québécois in 1976, systematically drove Anglophone business away. Depressed economic conditions in the Maritime Provinces have also resulted in de-population of those provinces in the 20th century, with heavy migration into Ontario.

==== Politics ====
The Ontario Progressive Conservative Party held power in the province from 1943 until 1985 by occupying the political centre and isolating both the Left and Right, at a time when Liberals most often controlled the national government in Ottawa.

By contrast the Co-operative Commonwealth Federation (CCF), which rebranded itself as the New Democratic Party (NDP) in 1961, was in the doldrums after the war. Its best showing was in 1948 when it elected 21 MPPs, and formed the official opposition. Purists said its decline resulted from a loss of Socialist purity and abandonment of the founding left-wing principles of the movement and party. They said democratic socialist activity in terms of activism, youth training, and volunteerism was lost in favour of authoritarian political bureaucracy. Moderates said the decline demonstrated the need for cooperation with Liberals. Political scientists said the party lacked the more coherent organizational base it needed to survive.

The NDP routinely captured 20-some per cent of the vote. In its surprise win in 1990, the NDP took 38% of the vote, won 75 of the 120 seats, and formed a government under Bob Rae. He served as premier but Ontario's labour unions, the backbone of the NDP, were outraged when Rae imposed pay cuts on unionized public workers. The NDP was defeated in 1995, falling back to 21% of the vote. Rae quit the NDP in 1998, describing it as too leftist, and joined the Liberals.

==== Women's labour laws ====
Ontario's Fair Employment Practices Act combatted racist and religious discrimination after the Second World War, but it did not cover gender issues. Most human rights activists did not raise the issue before the 1970s, because they were family oriented and subscribed to the deeply embedded ideology of the family wage, whereby the husband should be paid enough so the wife could be a full-time housewife. After lobbying by women, labour unions, and the Co-operative Commonwealth Federation (CCF), the Conservative government passed the Female Employees Fair Remuneration Act in 1951. It required equal pay for women who did the same work as men. Feminists in the 1950s and 1960s were unsuccessful trying to gain passage of a law to prohibit other forms of sex discrimination, such as in hiring and promotion. The enforcement of both acts was constrained by their conciliatory framework. Provincial officials interpreted the equal pay act quite narrowly, and were significantly more diligent in tackling racist and religious employment discrimination.

=== Issues during the 20th century ===
==== Conservation and museums ====
Early efforts in the preservation of natural resources began with the passage of the Public Parks Act in 1883, which called for public parks in every town and city. Algonquin Provincial Park, the first provincial park, was established in 1893. However, the creation of the provincial Department of Planning and Development did not take place until 1944; which brought conservation offices throughout the province and made for an integrated approach. The conservation authorities started to create heritage museums, but that ended in the 1970s when responsibility was shifted to the new ministry of Culture and Recreation. Repeated budget cuts in the 1980s and 1990s reduced the operation of many museums and historical sites.

==== Economy ====
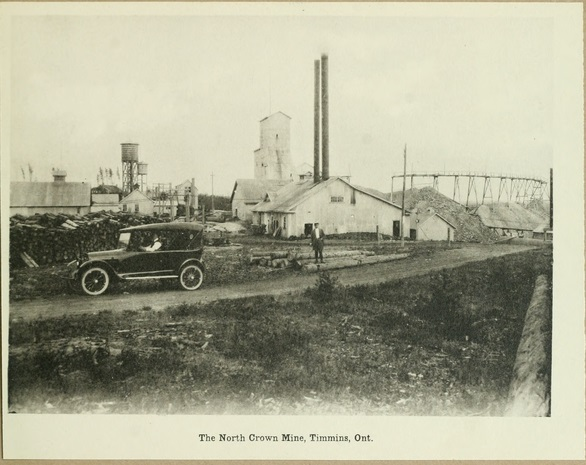
North Crown Mine in Timmins, c. early 1900s. Mining was a major sector of the economy in northern Ontario

Mineral exploitation accelerated in the late 19th century, leading to the rise of important mining centres in the northeast like Sudbury, Cobalt, and Timmins.

Energy policy focused on hydro-electric power, leading to the formation in 1906 of the Hydro-Electric Power Commission of Ontario (HEPC), renamed Ontario Hydro in 1974. HEPC was a unique hybrid of a government department, a Crown corporation, and a municipal cooperative that coexisted with the existing private companies. It was a "politically rational" rather than a "technically efficient" solution that depended on the watershed election of 1905 when the main issue became "Niagara Power". The Conservative slogan was "water power of Niagara should be free".

The Conservatives replaced the Liberals and set up HEPC. In 1908 HEPC began purchasing electricity from Niagara Falls. In the next decade it purchased most of the privately owned distribution systems and built an integrated network. The availability of cheap electric power stimulated the development of industry. The Ford Motor Company of Canada of Canada was established in 1904. General Motors Canada was formed in 1918. The motor vehicle industry became by 1920 the most productive industry in Ontario and a customer for smaller suppliers.

Entrepreneurship was exemplified by the career of John Northway (1848–1926). Beginning as a tailor in a small town, he moved to Toronto and soon developed a chain of department stores. His innovations in the sewing and marketing of ladies' wear stimulated the rise of a Canadian ladies' garment industry. Northway pioneered modern business and accounting methods. He innovated as well in labour relations, as a pioneer in sickness and accident compensation and profit-sharing schemes. A millionaire by 1910, he played a leading role in Toronto's civic life.

==== Modernization ====
===== Legal and police reform =====
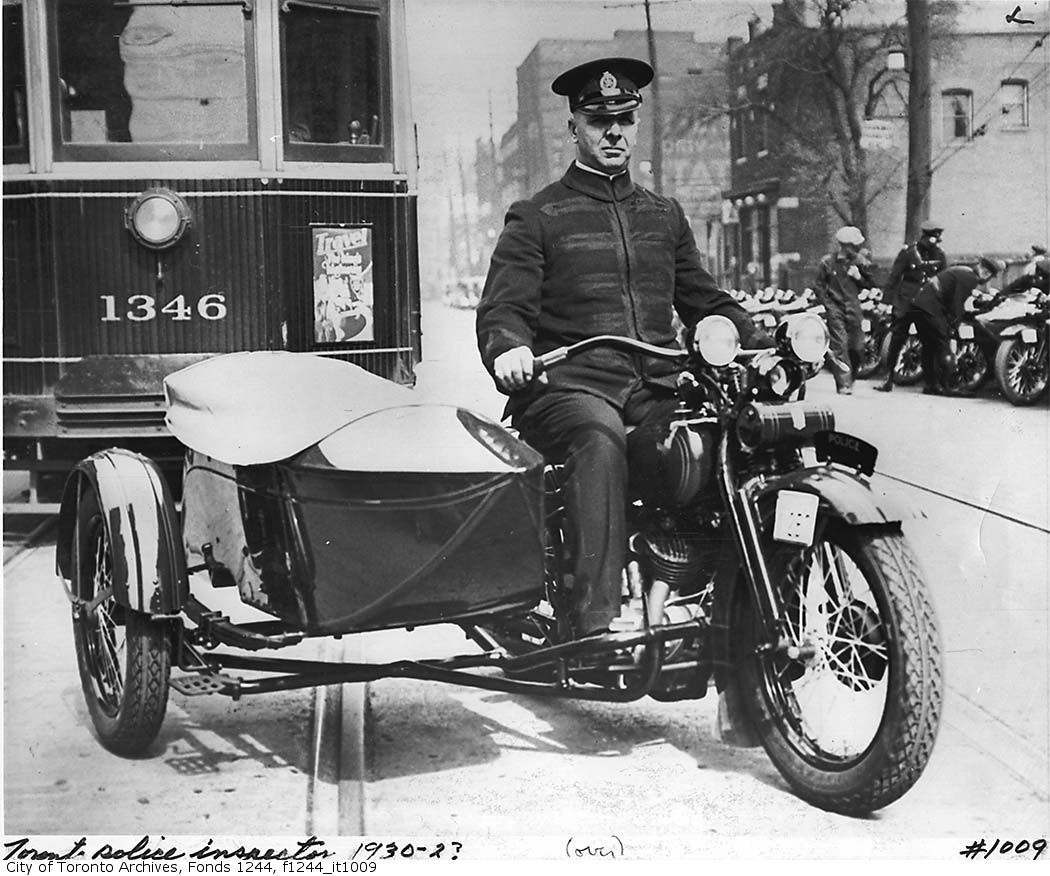
An inspector with the Toronto police riding a motorcycle, 1932

The construction of roads and canals depended on numerous workers, whose wages often went to liquor, gambling, and women, all causes for fighting and rowdiness. Community leaders realized the traditional method of dealing with troublemakers one by one was inadequate, and they began to adopt less personal modernized procedures that followed imperial models of policing, trial, and punishment through the courts.

Toronto, Hamilton, Berlin (Kitchener), Windsor and other cities modernized and professionalized their public services in the late 19th and early 20th centuries. No service was changed more dramatically than the police. The introduction of emergency telephone call boxes linked to a central dispatcher, plus the use of bicycles, motorcycles, and automobiles, shifted the patrolman's duties from passively walking the beat to fast reaction to reported incidents, as well as handling automobile traffic. After 1930 the introduction of police radios speeded response times.

===== Medicine =====
Once they had taken control of the practice of medicine, the doctors on the Medical Council of the College of Physicians and Surgeons of Ontario (CPSO) turned their attention to the quality of medical education in the province. Marginal and untrained practitioners were banned, but the question rose of the permanence and the quality of proprietary for-profit medical schools. CPSO-imposed regulations in the 1860s to increase faculty size and raise matriculation standards. They required students to take Council-administered examinations. Toronto had two medical schools – Trinity Medical School and the Toronto School of Medicine (TSM). During the 1880s the TSM added instructors, expanded its curriculum, and focused on clinical instruction. Enrollments grew at both schools. Critics found proprietary schools lacking, especially for their failure to offer sufficient instruction in the basic sciences.

In 1887, the TSM became the medical faculty of the University of Toronto, increasing its emphasis on research within the medical curriculum. Trinity realized that its survival depended as well on close ties to basic science, and in 1904 it also merged into the University of Toronto Faculty of Medicine. In 1923 University of Toronto researchers John Macleod (1876–1935) and Frederick Banting (1891–1941) won the Nobel Prize in Medicine for their 1921 discovery of insulin, putting Toronto on the world map of leading science.

===== Transportation =====
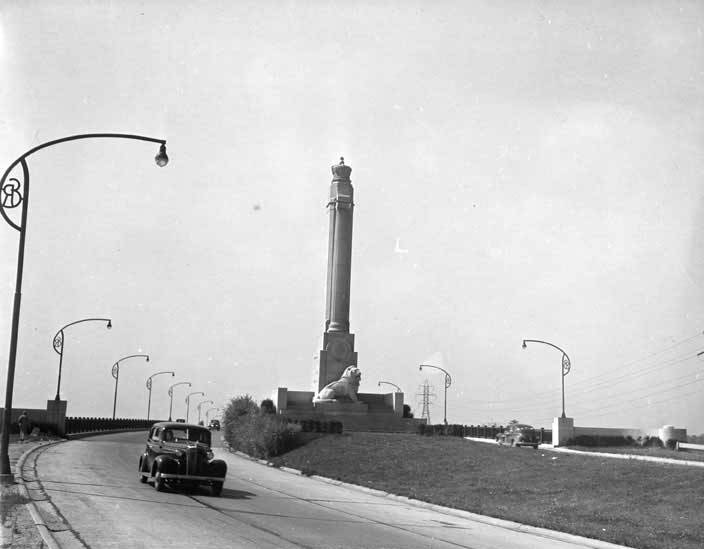
Entrance to the Queen Elizabeth Way, the first intercity divided highway, c. 1940

The rapid spread of automobiles after 1910 and the building of roads, especially after 1920, opened up opportunities in remote rural areas to travel to the towns and cities for shopping and services. City people moved outward to suburbs. By the 1920s it was common for city folk to have a vacation cottage in remote lake areas. A stretch of the Queen Elizabeth Way ("QEW") opened in 1939, becoming one of world's first controlled-access highways. The trend of city dwellers opening vacation cottages surged after 1945. It brought new money into remote areas, while also bringing negative environmental impacts and occasional conflict between cottagers and the permanent residents.

== 21st century Ontario ==
From the late 20th century to the early 21st century, Ontario received the largest number of immigrants in its history. Many of these immigrants came to concentrate themselves in Toronto and Brampton. From 2020 to 2021, Ontario's government and population dealt with the COVID-19 pandemic.

== Historical population ==
Ontario
| Year | Pop. | ±% |
|---|---|---|
| 1851 | 952,004 | — |
| 1861 | 1,396,091 | +46.6% |
| 1871 | 1,620,851 | +16.1% |
| 1881 | 1,926,922 | +18.9% |
| 1891 | 2,114,321 | +9.7% |
| 1901 | 2,182,947 | +3.2% |
| 1911 | 2,527,292 | +15.8% |
| 1921 | 2,933,662 | +16.1% |
| 1931 | 3,431,683 | +17.0% |
| 1941 | 3,787,655 | +10.4% |
| 1951 | 4,597,542 | +21.4% |
| 1961 | 6,236,092 | +35.6% |
| 1971 | 7,703,105 | +23.5% |
| 1981 | 8,625,107 | +12.0% |
| 1991 | 10,084,885 | +16.9% |
| 2001 | 11,410,046 | +13.1% |
| 2011 | 12,851,821 | +12.6% |
| 2021 | 14,223,942 | +10.7% |
Source: Statistics Canada website Censuses of Canada 1851 to 2011.

== See also ==
- Timeline of Ontario history
- Cobalt silver rush
- Porcupine Gold Rush

== Bibliography ==
- Dictionary of Canadian Biography online, short scholarly biographies of every major Canadian who died before 1930
- Akenson, Donald Harman. Irish in Ontario: A Study in Rural History (McGill-Queen's University Press, 1999)
- Baskerville, Peter A. (2005). Sites of power: a concise history of Ontario. Oxford University Press. ISBN 9780195418927.
- Christou, Theodore Michael. Progressive Education: Revisioning and Reframing Ontario’s Public Schools, 1919–1942 (2012)
- Drummond, Ian M. Progress Without Planning: The Economic History of Ontario from Confederation to the Second World War (1987)
- Glazebrook, G.P, deT. Life in Ontario: A Social History (University of Toronto Press, 1968)
- Grant, William Lawson (1911). "Ontario" . In Chisholm, Hugh (ed.). Encyclopædia Britannica. Vol. 20 (11th ed.). Cambridge University Press. pp. 113–117.
- Hall, Roger; Westfall, William; and MacDowell, Laurel Sefton, eds. Patterns of the Past: Interpreting Ontario's History. Dundurn Pr., 1988. 406 pp. excerpt and text search
- McCalla, Douglas. Planting The Province: The Economic History of Upper Canada, 1784–1870 (University of Toronto Press, 1993). 446 pp.
- McKillop, A.B. Matters of Mind: The University in Ontario, 1791-1951 (University of Toronto Press, 1994)
- Mays, John Bentley. Arrivals: Stories from the History of Ontario. Penguin Books Canada, 2002. 418 pp.
- Montigny, Edgar-Andre, ed. Ontario Since Confederation: A Reader (University of Toronto Press, 2000)
- Paikin, Steve. Paikin and the Premiers: Personal Reflections on a Half Century of Ontario Leaders (2013); popular biographies of nine premiers 1960-12013.
- Schull, Joseph. Ontario since 1867 (1978) 400pp; general survey emphasizing politics
- Whitcomb, Dr. Ed. A Short History of Ontario. (Ottawa. From Sea To Sea Enterprises, 2006) ISBN 0-9694667-6-5. 79 pp.
- White, Randall. Ontario: 1610–1985 (1985), general survey emphasizing politics
- Celebrating One Thousand Years of Ontario's History: Proceedings of the Celebrating One Thousand Years of Ontario's History Symposium, April 14, 15, and 16, 2000. (Ontario Historical Society, 2000) 343 pp.
