= Timeline of Ontario history =

Ontario came into being as a province of Canada in 1867 but historians use the term to cover its entire history dating back to its earliest known beginnings. This article also covers the history of the territory Ontario now occupies.

For a complete list of the premiers of Ontario, see List of Ontario premiers.

== Prehistory ==
- 10,000 BCE – Early Paleolithic peoples lived in the spruce woodlands of Southwestern Ontario with mastodons and mammoths. People living in this period, referred to by archaeologists as Early Paleo-Indians, created and used stone tools.
- 8,500 BCE – Late Paleolithic peoples inhabited the now-boreal pine forests of Southwestern Ontario hunting caribou, Arctic fox and rabbit or hare with darts and spear-throwers made from materials obtained through trade or travel with others at great distances. People living at this time are referred to by archaeologists as Late Paleo-Indians.
- 8,000–800 BCE – During the Archaic Period, the climate warmed further. People living in the deciduous forests of Southwestern Ontario hunted a wide variety of woodland animals. Deer and fish were important to their survival. The caribou had moved north. Larger trade networks were established, extending as far as the Gulf of Mexico, and the Atlantic seaboard. Tools now included: nets, weirs, bows, arrows, and implements made of copper. People also fashioned copper into beads and bracelets.
- 900 BCE–1610 AD – During the Woodland Era, pottery was first created. In the middle years, two distinct cultural groups emerged: Princess Point, and Riviere au Vase.
- 600–800 AD – Ontario Haudenosaunee (Iroquoian) Tradition Princess Point culture began focusing on horticulture—specifically the "Three Sisters" (corn, beans, and squash)—forming a complex matrilineal society. During this same period, the Western Riviere au Vase culture established a patrilineal Anishnaabe (Algonquin) society, continuing to follow a traditional seasonal migratory lifestyle.
- Aboriginal people lived on the land for millennia before European settlers came for purposes of exploration and colonization. When first Europeans travel to North America, First Nations people, mostly Algonquian and Iroquoian, are sharing the land where Ontario is now located.

== 1600s ==
- 1610 – Samuel de Champlain dispatches truchements to live among the Huron and the western Algonquin. The truchements played a multi-faceted role as interpreters, trade promoters, and explorers. They sought to align indigenous groups with French colonization effort.
- 1610–1612 – Étienne Brûlé, a truchement, explores what is now southern Ontario
- 1611 – Henry Hudson visits Hudson Bay and claims the region for Great Britain.
- 1615 – Samuel de Champlain visits Lake Huron, after which French missionaries establish outposts in the region.
- 1616 – Date of an early map of New France, entitled La Nouvelle France, which included much of what would become Southern Ontario. The map is attributed to Samuel de Champlain.
- 1639
  - Summer – Construction begins on Sainte-Marie among the Hurons, intended as a central headquarters for the French mission in Huronia.
  - November 1 – The first French mission to the Petun is established.
- 1640
  - The Iroquois raid the southernmost Petun settlement of Ehwae.
  - The Jesuits conduct a "winter mission" to the Neutrals during the winter of 1640–41.
- 1642 – In June, a "massive attack" by Iroquois forces destroys the Huron Rock Clan frontier settlement of Contarea.
- 1646 – In October, the French reactivate their mission to the Petun, with missionaries taking up residence in Ekarenniondi and Etharita.
- 1647 – The Iroquois raid the Petun settlement of Etharita.
- 1648 – Iroquois attack the French, destroying a Jesuit mission near the site of present-day Midland (see Canadian Martyrs).
- c. 1649–54 – Iroquois drive the Hurons, Petun and Neutral Nation from their territories. Around the same time, another population movement of the Mississaugas from the north shores of Lake Huron and Manitoulin Island to the Kawartha Lakes and Credit River areas.
- 1649
  - March 16 – The Iroquois capture the Huron settlements of St. Ignace and St. Louis.
  - March 19 – Inhabitants of the Huron town of Ossossané, along with its surrounding villages, flee the Iroquois advance overnight across an ice-covered Georgian Bay to take refuge among the Petun.
  - May 1 – Many Huron refugees living amongst the Petun depart with the Jesuit priest Pierre-Joseph-Marie Chaumonot to Christian Island.
  - December 7 – An Iroquois war party destroys the Petun settlement of Etharita (also known as St. Jean). This had become the southernmost Petun settlement after the abandonment of those to the south of it.
- 1668 – Father Marquette founds Sault Ste. Marie, noteworthy as the oldest surviving permanent European settlement in both Ontario and neighbouring Michigan.
- 1670 – The Hudson's Bay Company is granted a British royal charter to trade with First Nations people in the 3.9 million square kilometer territory named after Prince Rupert of the Rhine known as Rupert Land. This area includes much of what is now Northern Ontario and represents about a third of the land area of Canada.
- 1673–establishment of Cataraqui (modern day Kingston, Ontario).

== Part of Province of Quebec, 1763 to 1790 ==
- 1763 – Britain wins the Seven Years' War and takes full control of the future Ontario
- 1768 – Guy Carleton commissioned "Captain General and Governor in Chief" on 12 April 1768. He remains in command at Quebec till 1778.
- 1775–1783 U.S. War of Independence. No U.S. invaders enters present day Ontario but threat is considered real.
- 1778 – Sir Frederick Haldimand takes command as “Captain General and Governor in Chief" 26 June 1778. He occupies Cataraqui (Kingston, Ont.), reinforces Niagara and Detroit, and strengthens other military outposts against threatened U.S. invasion.
- 1779—Haldimand sends Captain Dietrich Brehm to strengthen the line of communication between Montreal and Detroit; more than 5,000 Natives are forced out of New York and come to Ft. Niagara for food and shelter; he increases the goods distributed as gifts through the Indian Department from about £10,000 in 1778 to £63,861 in 1782.
- 1783 – The Treaty of Paris ends the war; Canada-U.S. boundary is set along the St. Lawrence and Great Lakes
- 1784 – Haldimand purchases lands for exiled Loyalists from the Mississaugas for or £1,180
- 1784 Haldimand sets up 8 new townships for settlement along the upper St Lawrence from the westernmost seigneury to modern Brockville, Ontario, and five more around Cataraqui.
- 1784 – About 9,000 United Empire Loyalists settle in what is now southern Ontario, chiefly in Niagara, around the Bay of Quinte, and along the St. Lawrence River between Lake Ontario and Montreal. They are followed by many more Americans, some of them only attracted by the availability of cheap, arable land.

At the same time large numbers of Iroquois loyal to Britain arrive from the United States and are settled on reserves west of Lake Ontario.

Kingston and Hamilton became important settlements as a result of the influx of Loyalists.

- 1786 – Carleton, now Lord Dorchester, replaces Haldimand
- 1788 – On July 24, 1788, Governor General Lord Dorchester proclaims the land area to be divided up into "Lower Canada" with a French legal system and "Upper Canada" with a British legal system, whereby the land districts had been named Lunenburg, Mecklenburg, Nassau and Hesse in honour of the Royal family and the present large Germanic population.
- 1788 – The British purchase 250,000 acres (1,000 km^{2}) on which they begin the settlement of York, now Toronto
- 1780s-1830s - Thousands of Pennsylvania Dutch (German) farmers move from Pennsylvania to Upper Canada. They claimed a share of the United Empire Loyalists' foundational myth, drawing on its themes of loyalty and sacrifice.

== Upper Canada, 1791 to 1841 ==
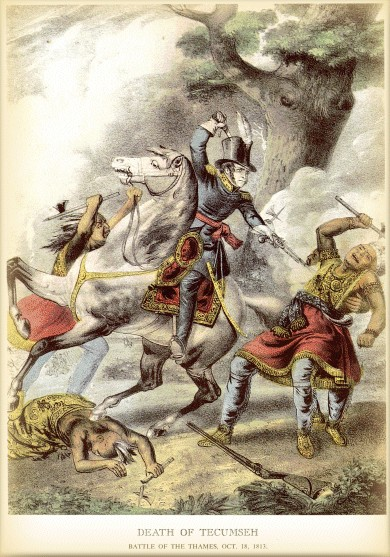
Tecumseh's death at the hands of Richard M. Johnson

- 1791 – The Constitutional Act of 1791, in conjunction with the Dorchester Proclamation of 1788, creates the first land registry for Quebec Upper Canada and the part of present-day Ontario south of Lake Nipissing plus the current Ontario shoreline of Georgian Bay and Lake Superior, and Lower Canada (the southern part of present-day Quebec). Upper Canada's first capital is Newark (present-day Niagara-on-the-Lake); in 1797 it is moved to York, now Toronto.

The population of Upper Canada grows from 6,000 in 1785 to 14,000 in 1790 to 46,000 in 1806. (Lower Canada's is about 165,000). The population is rural, and based on subsistence agriculture, with few exports; government spending is a major source of revenue.

- 1790s–1840s – Dueling is common among the elite, government officials, lawyers, and to military officers; they use dueling as a form of extralegal justice to assert their superior claims to honour. However, a new ethic is emerging that opposes dueling and rejects the hyper-masculinity embodied by the code of the duelist. This opposition is part of growing opposition to hierarchic dominance by the elite; opponents value the bourgeois husband and father and separate male honour from physical violence.
- 1793 – John Graves Simcoe is appointed as the first governor of Upper Canada. He encourages immigration from the United States, builds roads. Slavery is gradually abolished starting with the 1793 Act Against Slavery.
- 1795 – The Jay Treaty is ratified by which Britain agreed to vacate its Great Lakes forts on U.S. territory. Britain continues to supply the First Nations operating in the United States with arms and ammunition.
- 1800 – First European settlement on the site of present-day Ottawa
- 1801 – First ironworks in Upper Canada, located at Furnace Falls near Lyndhurst
- 1803 – The North West Company moves its mid-continent headquarters from Grand Portage, Minnesota to Fort William, now part of Thunder Bay to be in Upper Canada.
- 1803 – Thomas Talbot retires to his land grant in Western Ontario centred around present day St. Thomas and begins settling it. He eventually becomes responsible for settling 65,000 acres (260 km^{2}). His insistence on the provision and maintenance of good roads, and on reserving land along main roads to productive uses rather than to clergy reserves leads to this region becoming the most prosperous in the province.
- 1804 – First European settlement on the site of present-day Waterloo
- 1807 – First settlement, Ebytown, on the site of present-day Kitchener
- 1809 – The first documented appearance of steam navigation on the Great Lakes is at Prescott, when the steamship Dalhousie was launched for service on the Saint Lawrence River.
- 1812–1814 – The War of 1812 with the United States. Upper Canada is U.S. forces' chief target since it is weakly defended and populated largely by U.S. emigrants. However, division in the United States over the war, the incompetence of U.S. military commanders, and swift and decisive action by the British commander, Sir Isaac Brock, keep Upper Canada part of British North America.
- 1812–1813 - British forces capture Detroit on August 6, 1812. The Michigan Territory is held under British control until it is abandoned in 1813.
- 1813 – An U.S. army of 10,000 men under General William Henry Harrison move to recapture Detroit. British and Tecumseh's forces win the first battle at Frenchtown, January 22, 1813, killing 400 U.S. soldiers outright and taking 500 prisoners, many of whom are then killed.
- 1813 May – British and First Nations forces fail in their siege of Fort Meigs, at the mouth of Maumee river; in August, they are repulsed at Fort Stephenson
- 1813 September 10 – At the Battle of Lake Erie, the U.S. Navy destroys British naval power on Lake Erie. British and Tecumseh forces, with their logistics destroyed, retreat back toward Niagara
- 1813 October 5 – At the Battle of the Thames (also called "Battle of Moraviantown"), U.S. General Harrison, with 4500 infantry, intercepts retreating British and First Nations forces and wins a decisive victory. British power in western Ontario is ended, Tecumseh is killed, and his First Nations coalition collapses. U.S. forces take control of western Ontario for the remainder of the war and permanently end the threat of First Nation raids into Ohio, Indiana, and Michigan.
- 1814 – Population 95,000.
- 1815 – War ends and prewar boundaries are reestablished. One of the legacies of the war in Upper Canada is a strong feeling of anti-Americanism that persist to this day and forms an important component of Canadian nationalism.
- 1816 – Waterloo adopts its current name to honour the battle of Waterloo.
- 1817 – By the Rush–Bagot Treaty, Britain and the United States agree to keep large war vessels out of the Great Lakes.
- 1818 – The Treaty of 1818 reduces boundary and fishing disputes between British North America and the United States.
- 1820s–1840 – The Family Compact is a closed oligarchy of landowners, royal officials, lawyers, and businessmen who virtually monopolized public office and controlled the economy of the province in the 1820s and 1830s.
- 1820 – The Talbot Settlement is now completely settled, it settlement having resumed following interruption during the war years.
- 1821 – The North West Company merges with the Hudson's Bay Company
- 1823 – Peter Robinson settles the Bathurst District near Ottawa with immigrants from Cork County, Ireland.
- 1824 – The Church of Scotland is granted a share of the revenues from clergy reserves. Presbyterians by the 1830s were a major force for social conservatism. Ministers sent from Scotland in the 1820s and 1830s were surprised by the ethnic diversity, and horrified at the frontier way of life, which they saw as a devil's compound of illiteracy, drunkenness, ignorance of religion, and lack of schools. They promoted conservatism as a means of implanting Scottish moral values.
- 1825 – Peter Robinson settles Scott's Plains (later renamed Peterborough in his honour).
- 1825 – first settlement of Dresden
- 1826 – first settlement of London
- 1826 – With the creation of the Canada Company, free land is no longer available to immigrants willing to set up homesteads and farms.
- 1829 – as a result of the Fugitive slave laws in the United States, the first group of Blacks arrives from Ohio and settles on uncleared land north of London, Ontario. The routes they travelled to Upper Canada become known as the Underground Railroad.
- 1831 – Ontario population hits 236,000.
- 1832 – completion of the Rideau Canal from Kingston to Ottawa after six years of construction.
- 1832 – a serious cholera outbreak spreads quickly from Lower Canada killing thousands.
- 1833 – Building of the first Welland Canal directed by William Hamilton Merritt
- 1835-1845 - Shiners' War Irish labour unrest at Bytown (today's Ottawa).
- 1837 – Rebellions of 1837 - Upper Canada Rebellion in favour of responsible government; a similar rebellion (the Lower Canada Rebellion) occurs in Quebec. Canadian reformers take inspiration from the Republicanism in the United States. They demand the right to participate in the political process through the election of representatives; they seek to make the legislative council elective rather than appointed. British forces crush both rebellions, ending any possibility the two Canadas would become republics.
- 1839 – Lord Durham publishes a report on the causes of the rebellions in 1837. His report calls for representation by population between Ontario and Quebec, and an elected legislative assembly. When a public meeting is held to discuss the report, Family Compact official William Jarvis incites an Orange Order mob to attack. A member of The Children of Peace of Sharon, Ontario is seriously struck on the head. He later dies of his injury.
- 1839 Sydenham replaces Lord Durham as governor-general of Upper Canada.
- 1840 – The assembly passes a law providing for the sale of the clergy reserves, but it is disallowed by the British government.
- 1840 – Upper Canada is heavily in debt as a result of its heavy investments in canals.
- 1841 January - Toronto civic elections. Orange Order mobs beat up reform candidates. Robert Baldwin decides to run outside Toronto next time.

== The United Province of Canada (Canada West), 1841 to 1867 ==
- 1841 – Upper and Lower Canada are united by the Act of Union 1840 to form the Province of Canada, as recommended by Durham. Upper Canada becomes known as Canada West and Lower Canada as Canada East. By this Act, Canada West and Canada East are to have the same number of seats in the Legislative Assembly of the United Province.
- 1841 April - The first general election for the Legislative Assembly of the United Province (1st Parliament of the Province of Canada). Soon after the election, Robert Baldwin and The Children of Peace utopian settlement help ensure that Louis-Hippolyte Lafontaine is elected in by-election for the 4th York seat.
- 1841 – Population 455,000.
- 1841 – Sydenham is injured in a horse-riding accident and 15 days later dies. He is replaced by Sir Charles Bagot. The movement for responsible government that had been growing under Sydenham is now so strong that Bagot realizes that to govern effectively he must admit French leaders to his executive council. Once admitted, Canada East Reformer Louis-Hippolyte Lafontaine insists that Canada West Reformer Robert Baldwin also be admitted. Bagot admits Baldwin as well, creating a Reform bloc. (Baldwin loses the ministerial by-election but is elected in Rimouski by-election in 1843.)
- 1843 – Bagot retires because of illness and is replaced by Sir Charles Metcalfe, who is determined to make no further concessions to reform-minded colonists. Metcalfe refuses a demand by Baldwin and Francis Hincks that the assembly approve official appointments. The ministry in the assembly resigns, and in the ensuing election a slim majority supporting Metcalfe is returned.
- 1846 – The Colonial Secretary, Lord Grey, rules that the British North American lieutenant governors must rule with the consent of the governed. Executive councils are to be selected from the majority in the assembly, and change when the confidence of the assembly changes. Britain is abandoning the mercantilist principles that previously guided its imperial policy, and since colonial trade will no longer be restricted, local colonial politicians need no longer be restricted.
- 1846 – Britain repeals some of the tariffs against imports from the colonies, starting with the Corn Laws. This starts the negotiation of freer trade with the United States.
- 1847 – About 104,000 immigrants, many suffering from typhus, arrive to escape the Great Famine of Ireland. 1700 die of typhus, including doctors, nurses, priests and others who care for the sick. The immigrants land at Grosse Île, Canada East and Partridge Island, New Brunswick. Large numbers go on to settle in Canada West. Bytown (Ottawa), Kingston and Toronto receive many of them. This puts a strain on local resources. The wave of immigration drastically increases and changes the composition of the population in the province.
- 1848 – Lord Elgin, who replaced Metcalfe in 1847, asks Baldwin and Lafontaine to form a government following their success in elections for the Assembly. This is the Province of Canada's first responsible government.
- 1849 – Elgin signs the Rebellion Losses Bill, which provides compensation for losses suffered during the Lower Canada Rebellion. This is done despite the objections of conservative anglophones (Tories) in Canada East, who are accustomed to agreement from the governor-general. A Tory mob burns down the parliament building in Montreal. Elgin, supported by majorities of members from both Canada East and Canada West, does not back down, and responsible government is established in fact.
- 1849 – Canada East Tories sponsor an Annexation Manifesto calling for the Province of Canada to join the United States. They were motivated by the loss of trade threatened by the British government's repeal of British Corn Laws. However, the rest of the Canadian population, including Tories of Canada West, opposes the manifesto. Union with the United States ceases to be an important political issue.
- 1849 - Stony Monday Riot occurs when Lord Elgin scheduled a visit to Bytown to decide on choosing it as permanent site for capital. When Reformers prepare to welcome him, Tory thugs intervene - one killed and 30 wounded. Bytown later renamed Ottawa. (see 1857)
- 1850 – William Benjamin Robinson negotiates the Robinson Treaties with the Ojibwe nation, transferring to the Crown the eastern and northern shores of Lake Huron and the northern shore of Lake Superior.
- 1851 – The population of Canada West is 952,000, having more than doubled in 10 years, Canada West had more people than Canada East. Politicians of Canada West begin to argue for representation by population ('rep by pop'), which is achieved in 1867.
- 1854 – An agreement for reciprocal lowering of trade barriers is reached between British North America and the U.S. The British North American provinces can now send natural products (principally grain, timber, and fish) to the U.S. without tariff, while U.S. fishermen are allowed into British North American fisheries. Lake Michigan and the St. Lawrence River are opened to ships of all signatories.
- 1854 – Parliament passes a law secularizing the clergy reserves. The Anglican and Presbyterian churches retain their endowments.
- 1855 – A canal at Sault Ste. Marie on the St. Marys River (Michigan–Ontario) opens in May. This opens Lake Superior to U.S. and Canadian navigation, and eases access to the Red River colony in Manitoba.
- 1855 – The Great Western Railway links Windsor with Hamilton and Toronto.
- Bytown renamed Ottawa.
- 1856 – The Grand Trunk Railway opens between Sarnia and Montreal, easing the flow of goods and people across Southern Ontario and trade links with the U.S. Midwest. Towns along its route swell in importance and population.
- 1857 - Ottawa chosen as permanent capital of the Province of Canada.
- 1857 - 1857 election. Franchise extended to renters. But liberty is taken with this loosening, and many more vote than legally entitled.
- 1858 – Canada has become increasingly sectional and politically polarized, with Canada West electing Clear Grit Liberals and Canada East electing Conservatives. A coalition government led by John A. Macdonald and George-Étienne Cartier falls in two days. Replaced by the George Brown-Antoine-Aimé Dorion government, which also is defeated in short order. Macdonald and Cartier get back into power and engage in a legal machination to keep government power this time. Assembly member Alexander Galt proposes a federal union of British North American colonies to solve the political instability.
- 1858 – The temporary judicial districts of Algoma and Nipissing are created, the first in Northern Ontario.
- 1859 – The Clear Grit Liberals under George Brown propose specific arrangements for a federal union of the two Canadas, as opposed to the unitary Province of Canada.
- 1861 – Population is 1,396,000.
- 1864 – George Brown proposes a committee to inquire into solutions to the parliamentary deadlock between the Canadas. It recommends a federal union of the British North American colonies, a solution that is welcomed by all sides. A government of Liberals and Conservatives, the Great Coalition, is formed to pursue this goal. Representatives of the Great Coalition attend the Charlottetown Conference which is called to discuss a union of the Province of Canada with the maritime colonies and to persuade representatives to endorse the Canadian plan for a broad federal union. A conference in Quebec City draws up the Quebec Resolutions, a plan for this union.
- 1866 – The Westminster Conference endorses the Quebec Resolutions with minor changes.
- 1866 – Fenians make an incursion into Ontario. After a minor skirmish on the Niagara Peninsulia at Ridgeway, the invaders withdraw back to the U.S. This incident deepens the public's desire for full-fledged nationhood (see Fenian raids).

== 1867 to 1942 ==
Canada 1867 and after. The Province of Ontario 1867 and after

- 1867 – The parliament of the United Kingdom passes the British North America Act, by which the provinces of United Canada, New Brunswick, and Nova Scotia join to form Canada. United Canada was split into Canada East/Est and Canada West/Ouest, the latter of which eventually changed its name to Ontario. The capital of Canada West was the city of York, which later changed its name to Toronto.
- 1870 – There is large public support amongst Protestants for the trying of Louis Riel for treason for executing Thomas Scott during the so-called Red River Rebellion in Manitoba, while many Quebecers support Riel. Although Riel's government was finally recognized by Canada, its actions are destined to be described as a rebellion ever after. Tensions rise between Quebec and English Canada.
- 1870 – the head of construction for the Dawson Road to Manitoba is named Prince Arthur's Landing by Colonel Garnet Wolseley during the Red River Rebellion.
- 1870s – The growth of industry in Ontario and Quebec leads to a movement for protective tariffs.
- 1871 – Toronto Trades Assembly is formed. First central union body in Canada.
- 1871 – The first census following Confederation puts Ontario's population at 1,620,851.
- 1871 – Thunder Bay District, Ontario, is created out of the western portion of Algoma District, Ontario.
- 1872 – Federal government employs contractors to survey the route of the Canadian Pacific Railway through Northwestern Ontario, to stimulate settlement of Western Canada, to bring Western agricultural and other products to Ontario and Quebec, and to link British Columbia to the rest of the country. The CPR is part of Sir John A. Macdonald's National Policy.
- 1872 – March 25, the Toronto Typographical Union goes on strike against their employer, the editor of The Globe. Liberal Party leader George Brown demands a nine-hour workday. Union activity then being a criminal offence, 24 members of strike committee jailed for conspiracy. John A. Macdonald's Conservative government passes Trade Unions Act on June 14, legalizing trade unions.
- 1872 - Daniel O'Donoghue helped found the Ottawa Trades Council. In 1874 he was elected to the Ontario Legislature, becoming Canada's first elected labour MPP.
- 1872 – April 15, the Toronto Trades Assembly organizes the country's first significant workers demonstration.
- 1872 – September 3, Ottawa unionists hold a 10,000-person-strong parade through the city. Prime Minister John A. Macdonald joins and gives a speech where he promises to abolish the sort of laws that had put the Toronto printers in jail. Canadian Parliament names Labour Day (first Monday in September) a holiday in 1894, and now it is a world-wide holiday.
- 1872-1896 – The provincial government of Oliver Mowat vigorously defends provincial rights and expands the scope of provincial power.
- 1874 – First issue of The Nation, founded by members of the Canada First movement to help in creating a Canadian nationality. Although the journal only lasted until 1876, other publications continued the effort after it stopped publishing.
- 1875 – Construction of the Canadian Pacific Railway begins in June at Fort William, Ontario.
- 1875 - Jubilee riots in Toronto
- 1879 – The federal government of Sir John A. Macdonald, as part of its national Policy, institutes protective tariffs on manufactures and on farm products; the tariffs help Ontario industry but hurt farmers.
- 1880-1900 – Knights of Labor, formed in 1869 in Philadelphia, active in Ontario.
- 1882 – The Canadian Pacific Railway Thunder Bay to Winnipeg is completed in June by the federal government.
- 1883 – Important mineral deposits are found near Sudbury; this and similar discoveries, especially near Cobalt, triggered a mining boom in Northern Ontario. The region acquires a large French-speaking population as Quebeckers move there to work in the boom.
- 1885 – The split between the Orange in Ontario and Roman Catholic Quebec is aggravated further by Protestant public support in Ontario for the hanging of Louis Riel, convicted of treason for his role in the North-West Rebellion that year.
- 1885 – Rainy River District, Ontario is created after Toronto its boundaries case before the Judicial Committee of the Privy Council.
- 1889 – The Imperial Parliament confirms Ontario's right to Northwestern Ontario west to Lake of the Woods and north of the Albany River by incorporation of sections of the District of Keewatin.
- 1890-1896 – Tension between English and French is further aggravated by the disagreement between Ontario and Quebec over the Manitoba Schools Question. Ontario objects to a federal remedial bill to restore French schools in Manitoba in part because of its support for provincial rights, and in part because of the influence of a Protestant Equal rights movement begun in response to pro-Roman Catholic policies instituted in Quebec.
- 1893 – A severe economic recession hits dropping the province's industrial output. Many in Ontario seek new opportunities further west following the recently completed transcontinental railroad.
- 1896 – The Judicial Committee of the Privy Council rules that the federal government may exercise its reserve power only in time of war. This results in an increase in provincial power as areas of provincial responsibility are interpreted more broadly to accommodate new types of government initiative (social welfare, for example).
- 1896 – Sir Oliver Mowat resigns after 24 years as premier.
- 1903 – Consolidated Lake Superior riot
- 1906 – Establishment of the Hydro-Electric Power Commission of Ontario by the government of Sir James P. Whitney at the urging of Sir Adam Beck.
- 1906 – Thunder Bay - Workers conduct the first strike at the Lakehead. Again and again, area workers band together to fight for wage increases, job security and non-discriminatory hiring practices.
- 1906 - Labour leader Allan Studholme is elected Member of the Legislative Assembly (MLA) in the Ontario legislature in a 1906 by-election in Hamilton East. He serves in that position until his death in 1919.
- 1912 – Ontario acquires its current territory by incorporation of further sections of the North-West territories
- 1912 – Regulation 17 bans teaching in French after the first year of school and the teaching of French after the fourth; this infuriates Francophones across Canada and further divides the country.
- 1913 – Thunder Bay (Port Arthur and Fort William) - conductors and motormen of the civic railway (streetcar service) go on strike. Violence on both sides. The 1913 strike is the last major outburst of labour violence in Thunder Bay prior to World War I.
- 1914 – The Workmen's Compensation Act, the first social insurance legislation in Canadian history, is adopted by the Legislative Assembly of Ontario.
- 1914–1918 – First World War
- 1916 – Hamilton machinists' strike
- 1916 – The city of Berlin. Its many city residents of German origin are under pressure to demonstrate their loyalty to the war effort so city changes its name to Kitchener.
- 1916–1927 – Ontario institutes prohibition, banning sale of beer and spirits. Beer and spirits continue to be produced but only for export. Prohibition ends in 1927. but government sale of liquor is a policy for a century. The ban against public bars selling alcohol is in place until 1934. The Ontario Liquor Control Board held a monopoly on the sale of spirits until
- 1918 - 1918 Toronto anti-Greek riot
- 1918 – Ontario machinists strive for common wages, eight-hour day, and improved work conditions across the province. Hold first provincial convention of machinists in Toronto in July 1918.
- 1919 - As part of Canadian Labour Revolt and partially due to One Big Union leadership, general strike takes place in Toronto. Overall more than 34,000 workers go on strike in Ontario between May and July, for a total of 632,409 striker days.
- 1919 provincial election - led to the formation of a United Farmers of Ontario-Labour coalition government. UFO lost most of its seats in the 1923 election.
- 1924 Ontario prohibition plebiscite. Voters vote 52 per cent to 48 per cent to retain the Ontario Temperance Act as opposed to government-controlled sales of liquor
- 1927 - Ontario government ends prohibition. Establishes Liquor Control Board of Ontario.
- 1928 – Ontario - Hollinger gold mine disaster. 39 are killed by fire in the mine.
- 1929 – Death (suspected murder) in Thunder Bay of Finnish-Canadian union organizers Rosvall and Voutilainen.
- 1930 – Workers' Unity League, an organization of industrial unionism, is formed at the Toronto labour union conference. Harvey Murphy and Thomas Ewen are early leaders.
- 1932 - Ontario Co-operative Commonwealth Federation is formed. CCF candidate Samuel Lawrence elected in Hamilton East in the 1934 provincial election.
- 1933 – Stratford General Strike. Members of the Workers' Unity League are prominent. Military units equipped with machine guns and armored cars (or tanks) arrive to face off against the picketers.
- 1937 – Premier Mitchell Hepburn uses the Ontario Provincial Police to suppress a CIO strike at General Motors in Oshawa after the federal government refuses to suppress it. Hepburn is unsuccessful in keeping the CIO out of Ontario.

== 1943 to 1985 ==
- 1943 – George Drew and the Progressive Conservative Party of Ontario are elected, beginning 42 years of Conservative government.
- 1945 – Ford strike of 1945
- 1951 – A civil rights movement originates in opposition to racial discrimination in Dresden, Ontario. The government of Conservative Premier Leslie Frost passes Canada's first Fair Employment Practices Act, which forbids discrimination on the basis of race, creed, colour, nationality, ancestry or place of origin. However, the act is enforced administratively, with prosecution only a last resort.
- 1951 – The Frost government passes Ontario's first equal pay legislation, the Female Employees Fair Remuneration Act.
- 1954 – The Frost government introduces Canada's first Fair Accommodation Practices Act. Like the Fair Employment Practices Act it is enforced administratively, with prosecution only a last resort.
- 1955 – The first conviction under the Fair Accommodation Practices Act, of Kay's Cafe in Dresden, the site of the original complaint of racial discrimination in Dresden, is overturned on appeal.
- 1956 – First successful prosecution under the Fair Accommodation Practices Act, again of Kay's Cafe in Dresden
- 1956 – The Mine, Mill and Smelter Workers hold a national convention in Sudbury, Ontario, at which singer and activist Paul Robeson gives his first concert outside the United States since being placed under a travel ban by the United States government in 1950.
- 1961 - Ontario New Democratic Party is formed. In the 1967 provincial election, ONDP elects 20 Members of Provincial Parliament (MPPs).
- 1961 – September 10, a Mine, Mill and Smelter Workers meeting at Sudbury Arena, regarding the union's controversial proposal to merge with the United Steelworkers, erupts into a riot.
- 1962 – Passage of the Ontario Human Rights Code, which amalgamates and extends previous laws about civil rights.
- 1963 – Reesor Siding Strike in Northern Ontario. Picketline-crossing log suppliers shot eleven strikers, three were killed.
- 1966 – The government of John Robarts introduces universal health insurance within the province.
- 1967 – The Ontario Pavilion is opened at Expo 67 in Montreal, and Ontario gets its unofficial theme song: "A Place to Stand, A Place to Grow".
- 1967 – GO Transit commuter rail network begins operation in the Toronto region.
- 1967 – The international Mine, Mill and Smelter Workers merge with the United Steelworkers. Local 598 in Sudbury, Ontario is the only Mine Mill local in the world to reject the merger, instead continuing operations as an unaffiliated union organization until 1993, when it joins the Canadian Auto Workers.
- 1970 – The provincially funded TVOntario goes on the air.
- 1971 – Ontario Place theme park opens in Toronto created by the Government of Ontario
- 1976 – The CN Tower in Toronto is completed and opens to the public.
- 1978 – September 15, the Inco Strike of 1978 begins in Sudbury, Ontario. Workers remain on strike for almost nine months, until June 7, 1979.
- 1979 – A train derailment in Mississauga causes the largest evacuation of a city in North American history.
- 1984 – Strike at Eaton's department stores by the Retail, Wholesale and Department Store Union (RWDSU) begins in November in southern Ontario. The strike is settled the following May.

== Since 1985 ==
- 1985 – David Peterson's Liberals gain power. The Progressive Conservative government of Frank Miller falls, ending 42 years of the "Big Blue Machine". Liberals themselves lose power in 1989 to the NDP.
- 1985 – Brewer's Retail strike cripples the hospitality industry throughout the summer
- 1985 – The Canadian Auto Workers becomes independent of their former parent union, the United Auto Workers. This process is documented in the film Final Offer (1985).
- 1988 – Toronto hosts the 14th G7 conference.
- 1989 – Canada–U.S. Free Trade Agreement goes into effect. Some industries suffer from increased competition. The loss of jobs in the Ontario manufacturing sector during the recession of the early 1990s was attributed (fairly or not) to the Free Trade Agreement.
- 1990–1992 – A major recession hits Ontario. Many companies massively downsize and threaten to leave Canada all together. Advancements in manufacturing such as automation and globalization destabilize the province's economy and lead to a decade of instability
- 1990 general election gives Bob Rae's ONDP a majority of seats in the Legislature. This is the only time the NDP has formed government in Ontario.
- 1993 – Due to major budget shortfalls, the government of Bob Rae introduces its so-called social contract (nicknamed Rae Days) which re-opens public-sector collective agreements with the intent of rolling back wages. Traditional labour support for the NDP is greatly weakened. NDP government is turfed out in the 1995 election.
- 1994 – The North American Free Trade Agreement comes into effect.
- 1994 – The Ontario budget deficit reaches $17 billion (CAD)
- 1995 – The Progressive Conservative Party under Mike Harris campaigns on the concept of the Common Sense Revolution. It wins 41 percent of the vote and a large majority in the Assembly.
- 1995 – First Nations man, Dudley George, killed by Ontario Provincial Police officers while protesting at Ipperwash.
- 1997 – The province passes the Bill 103 (the 'Mega City' bill) that calls for the dissolution of Metro Toronto and merging of 6 cities within it to create the new City of Toronto.
- 1997 – Ontario teachers strike
- 1998 – The government of Mike Harris begins privatizing the Hydro-Electric Power Commission of Ontario.
- 1999 – Highway 407 (built in 1997) is sold to a private company.
- 2000 – Seven people die after contamination of Walkerton's water supply.
- 2001 – The former City of Ottawa merges with the Regional Municipality of Ottawa–Carleton to form the new city Ottawa.
- 2003 – Outbreak of SARS in Toronto; 44 die and tourist revenue drops by half. The World Health Organization advises against all but essential travel to the city.
- 2003 – Two decisions of the Court of Appeal for Ontario legalize same-sex marriage in Ontario.
- 2003 – Most of Ontario is plunged into darkness when a major electrical blackout hits eastern North America.
- 2003 – The Liberal party returns to power under the leadership of Dalton McGuinty.
- 2006 – Ontario province-wide strike of college staff. Ontario College Professor John Stammers is fatally injured while trying to stop car from crossing picket line.
- 2007 – The Liberal party remains in power and keeps control of its majority government.
- 2008 – April 26, Toronto Transit Commission strike
- 2009 - Strikes. City of Windsor inside and outside workers strike begins in April. City of Toronto inside and outside workers strike begins in June.
- 2010 – Dalton McGuinty's Liberals end Ontario's use of the GST and creates the HST
- 2010 – Muskoka host the G8 summit, and Toronto Hosts the G20 summit. 2010 G20 Toronto Summit protests accompany the event.
- 2010 – The Ontario debt surpasses $200 billion (CAD)
- 2011 – The Ontario Liberals lose their majority in the Assembly, yet remain in power with a minority government in the Ontario general election.
- 2012 – September 11, Ontario Premier Dalton McGuinty and the Liberal party pass Bill 115 'Putting Students First Act 2012', thereby eliminating the rights of all teachers in the province to go on strike for the next two years. Bill 115 also freezes wages, grants ten sick days per year (down from twenty) and eliminates banked sick days from previous years. Unions state that this bill is a violation of their members' rights under the Charter of Rights and Freedoms and that the bill violates the Ontario Labour Relations Act of 1995.
- 2012 – Premier Dalton McGuinty resigns amidst numerous scandals. Kathleen Wynne becomes premier. She is the first female premier of Ontario and first openly gay premier in Canadian history.
- 2015 - the Liquor Control Board of Ontario authorizes some supermarkets to sell cider, wine, and beer within their grocery aisles.
- 2019 – Sheet Metal Workers' International Association ICI (Industrial, Commercial, Institutional) members go on strike in Ontario for 8 weeks in May and June, first strike in 30 years for that organization.
- 2020 – Premier Doug Ford declares a state of emergency in the province, amid the COVID-19 pandemic in Ontario.
- 2021 – Premier Doug Ford declares a second state of emergency in the province, amid the COVID-19 pandemic in Ontario.

== Bibliography ==
=== General ===
- The Dictionary of Canadian Biography(1966–2006), thousands of scholarly biographies of those who died before 1931
- Gough, Barry M. Historical Dictionary of Canada (1999) excerpt and text search
- Hallowell, Gerald, ed. The Oxford Companion to Canadian History (2004) 1650 short entries excerpt and text search
- Marsh, James C. ed. The Canadian Encyclopedia 4 vol 1985; also cd-ROM and online editions
- Pound, Richard W. Fitzhenry & Whiteside Book of Canadian Facts and Dates, Fitzhenry & Whiteside, 2004. ISBN 1-55041-171-3
- Toye, William, ed. The Oxford Companion to Canadian Literature. Oxford U. Press, 1983. 843 pp.

=== Surveys ===
- Celebrating One Thousand Years of Ontario's History: Proceedings of the Celebrating One Thousand Years of Ontario's History Symposium, April 14, 15, and 16, 2000. Ontario Historical Society, 2000. 343 pp.
- Baskerville, Peter A. Sites of Power: A Concise History of Ontario. Oxford U. Press., 2005. 296 pp. (first edition was Ontario: Image, Identity and Power, 2002). online review
- Chambers, Lori, and Edgar-Andre Montigny, eds. Ontario Since Confederation: A Reader (2000), articles by scholars
- Hall, Roger; Westfall, William; and MacDowell, Laurel Sefton, eds. Patterns of the Past: Interpreting Ontario's History. Dundurn Pr., 1988. 406 pp.
- McGowan, Mark George and Clarke, Brian P., eds. Catholics at the "Gathering Place": Historical Essays on the Archdiocese of Toronto, 1841–1991. Canadian Catholic Historical Assoc.; Dundurn, 1993. 352 pp.
- McKillop, A. B. Matters of Mind: The University in Ontario, 1791–1951. U. of Toronto Press, 1994. 716 pp.
- Mays, John Bentley. Arrivals: Stories from the History of Ontario. Penguin Books Canada, 2002. 418 pp.
- Noel, S. J. R. Patrons, Clients, Brokers: Ontario Society and Politics, 1791–1896. U. of Toronto Press, 1990.

==== Ontario to 1869 ====
- Careless, J. M. S. Brown of the Globe (2 vols, Toronto, 1959–63), vol 1: The Voice of Upper Canada 1818-1859; vol 2: The Statesman of Confederation 1860–1880.
- Clarke, John. Land Power and Economics on the Frontier of Upper Canada (2001) 747pp.
- Clarke, John. The Ordinary People of Essex: Environment, Culture, and Economy on the Frontier of Upper Canada (2010)
- Cohen, Marjorie Griffin. Women's Work, Markets, and Economic Development in Nineteenth-Century Ontario. (1988). 258 pp.
- Craig, Gerald M Upper Canada: the formative years 1784–1841 McClelland and Stewart, 1963, the standard history online edition
- Dunham, Eileen Political unrest in Upper Canada 1815–1836 (1963).
- Errington, Jane The Lion, the Eagle, and Upper Canada: A Developing Colonial Ideology (1987).
- Gidney, R. D. and Millar, W. P. J. Professional Gentlemen: The Professions in Nineteenth-Century Ontario. (1994).
- Grabb, Edward, James Curtis, Douglas Baer; "Defining Moments and Recurring Myths: Comparing Canadians and Americans after the American Revolution" The Canadian Review of Sociology and Anthropology, Vol. 37, 2000
- Johnson, J. K. and Wilson, Bruce G., eds. Historical Essays on Upper Canada: New Perspectives. (1975). . 604 pp.
- Keane, David and Read, Colin, ed. Old Ontario: Essays in Honour of J. M. S. Careless. (1990).
- Kilbourn, William.; The Firebrand: William Lyon Mackenzie and the Rebellion in Upper Canada (1956) online edition
- Knowles, Norman. Inventing the Loyalists: The Ontario Loyalist Tradition and the Creation of Usable Pasts. (1997). 244 pp.
- Landon, Fred, and J.E. Middleton. Province of Ontario: A History (1927) 4 vol. with 2 vol of biographies
- Lewis, Frank and Urquhart, M.C. Growth and standard of living in a pioneer economy: Upper Canada 1826–1851 Institute for Economic Research, Queen's University, 1997.
- McCalla, Douglas Planting the province: the economic history of Upper Canada 1784–1870 (1993).
- McGowan, Mark G. Michael Power: The Struggle to Build the Catholic Church on the Canadian Frontier. (2005). 382 pp. online review from H-CANADA
- McNairn, Jeffrey L The capacity to judge: public opinion and deliberative democracy in Upper Canada 1791–1854 (2000). online review from H-CANADA
- Oliver, Peter. "Terror to Evil-Doers": Prisons and Punishments in Nineteenth-Century Ontario. (1998). 575 pp. post 1835
- Rea, J. Edgar. "Rebellion in Upper Canada, 1837" Manitoba Historical Society Transactions Series 3, Number 22, 1965–66, historiography online edition
- Reid, Richard M. The Upper Ottawa Valley to 1855. (1990). 354 pp.
- Rogers, Edward S. and Smith, Donald B., eds. Aboriginal Ontario: Historical Perspectives on the First Nations. (1994). 448 pp.
- Styran, Roberta M. and Taylor, Robert R., ed. The "Great Swivel Link": Canada's Welland Canal. Champlain Soc., 2001. 494 pp.
- Westfall, William. Two Worlds: The Protestant Culture of Nineteenth-Century Ontario. (1989). 265 pp.
- Wilton, Carol. Popular Politics and Political Culture in Upper Canada, 1800–1850. (2000). 311pp

==== Ontario since 1869 ====
- Azoulay, Dan. Keeping the Dream Alive: The Survival of the Ontario CCF/NDP, 1950–1963. (1997). 307 pp.
- Baskerville, Peter A. Ontario: Image, Identity, and Power. (2002). 256pp
- Cameron, David R. and White, Graham. Cycling into Saigon: The Conservative Transition in Ontario. (2000). 224 pp. Analysis of the 1995 transition from New Democratic Party (NDP) to Progressive Conservative (PC) rule in Ontario
- Comacchio, Cynthia R. Nations Are Built of Babies: Saving Ontario's Mothers and Children, 1900–1940. (1993). 390 pp.
- Cook, Sharon Anne. "Through Sunshine and Shadow": The Woman's Christian Temperance Union, Evangelicalism, and Reform in Ontario, 1874–1930. (1995). 281 pp.
- Darroch, Gordon and Soltow, Lee. Property and Inequality in Victorian Ontario: Structural Patterns and Cultural Communities in the 1871 Census. U. of Toronto Press, 1994. 280 pp.
- Devlin, John F. "A Catalytic State? Agricultural Policy in Ontario, 1791–2001." PhD dissertation U. of Guelph 2004. 270 pp. DAI 2005 65(10): 3972-A. DANQ94970 Fulltext: in ProQuest Dissertations & Theses
- Evans, A. Margaret. Sir Oliver Mowat. U. of Toronto Press, 1992. 438 pp. Premier 1872–1896
- Fleming, Keith R. Power at Cost: Ontario Hydro and Rural Electrification, 1911–1958. McGill-Queen's U. Press, 1992. 326 pp.
- Gidney, R. D. From Hope to Harris: The Reshaping of Ontario's Schools. U. of Toronto Press, 1999. 362 pp. deals with debates and changes in education from 1950 to 2000
- Gidney, R. D. and Millar, W. P. J. Inventing Secondary Education: The Rise of the High School in Nineteenth-Century Ontario. McGill-Queen's U. Press, 1990. 440 pp.
- Halpern, Monda. And on that Farm He Had a Wife: Ontario Farm Women and Feminism, 1900–1970. (2001). 234 pp. online review from H-CANADA
- Hines, Henry G. East of Adelaide: Photographs of Commercial, Industrial and Working-Class Urban Ontario, 1905–1930. London Regional Art and History Museum, 1989.
- Hodgetts, J. E. From Arm's Length to Hands-On: The Formative Years of Ontario's Public Service, 1867–1940. U. of Toronto Press, 1995. 296 pp.
- Houston, Susan E. and Prentice, Alison. Schooling and Scholars in Nineteenth-Century Ontario. U. of Toronto Press, 1988. 418 pp.
- Ibbitson, John. Promised Land: Inside the Mike Harris Revolution. Prentice-Hall, 1997. 294 pp. praise for Conservatives
- Kechnie, Margaret C. Organizing Rural Women: the Federated Women's Institutes of Ontario, 1897–1910. McGill-Queen's U. Press, 2003. 194 pp.
- Landon, Fred, and J.E. Middleton. Province of Ontario: A History (1937) 4 vol. with 2 vol of biographies
- Marks, Lynne. Revivals and Roller Rinks: Religion, Leisure and Identity in Late Nineteenth-Century Small-Town Ontario. U. of Toronto Press, 1996. 330 pp.
- Montigny, Edgar-Andre, and Lori Chambers, eds. Ontario since Confederation: A Reader (2000).
- Moss, Mark. Manliness and Militarism: Educating Young Boys in Ontario for War. (2001). 216 pp.
- Neatby, H. Blair and McEown, Don. Creating Carleton: The Shaping of a University. McGill-Queen's U. Press, 2002. 240 pp.
- Ontario Bureau of Statistics and Research (1947). A Conspectus of the Province of Ontario. Archived from the original on 2012-10-21 – via Questia.
- Parr, Joy, ed. A Diversity of Women: Ontario, 1945–1980. U. of Toronto Press, 1996. 335 pp.
- Ralph, Diana; Régimbald, André; and St-Amand, Nérée, eds. Open for Business, Closed for People: Mike Harris's Ontario. Fernwood, 1997. 207 pp. leftwing attack on Conservative party of 1990s
- Roberts, David. In the Shadow of Detroit: Gordon M. McGregor, Ford of Canada, and Motoropolis. Wayne State U. Press, 2006. 320 pp.
- Santink, Joy L. Timothy Eaton and the Rise of His Department Store. U. of Toronto Press, 1990. 319 pp.
- Saywell, John T. "Just Call Me Mitch": The Life of Mitchell F. Hepburn. U. of Toronto Press, 1991. 637 pp. Biography of Liberal premier 1934–1942
- Schryer, Frans J. The Netherlandic Presence in Ontario: Pillars, Class and Dutch Ethnicity. Wilfrid Laurier U. Press, 1998. 458 pp. focus is post WW2
- Schull, Joseph. Ontario since 1867 (1978), narrative history
- Stagni, Pellegrino. The View from Rome: Archbishop Stagni's 1915 Reports on the Ontario Bilingual Schools Question. McGill-Queen's U. Press, 2002. 134 pp.
- Warecki, George M. Protecting Ontario's Wilderness: A History of Changing Ideas and Preservation Politics, 1927–1973. Lang, 2000. 334 pp.
- White, Graham, ed. The Government and Politics of Ontario. 5th ed. U. of Toronto Press, 1997. 458 pp.
- White, Randall. Ontario since 1985. Eastendbooks, 1998. 320 pp.
- Wilson, Barbara M. ed. Ontario and the First World War, 1914–1918: A Collection of Documents (Champlain Society, 1977)
