= 2009 City of Windsor inside and outside workers strike =

The 2009 City of Windsor inside and outside workers strike was a stop-work action undertaken by the Canadian Union of Public Employees' local unions in the city of Windsor, Ontario held from April 15, 2009, to July 24, 2009. The over-15-week-long strike was the result of a proposal by the city to not offer post-retirement benefits for new employees of the city. The strike impacted various city services, including most prominently garbage pickup and parks and recreation, leading to illegal dumping of trash and unmaintained grass.

== See also ==
- 2009 City of Toronto inside and outside workers strike
