= 2009 City of Toronto inside and outside workers strike =

2009 strike action in Toronto, Canada

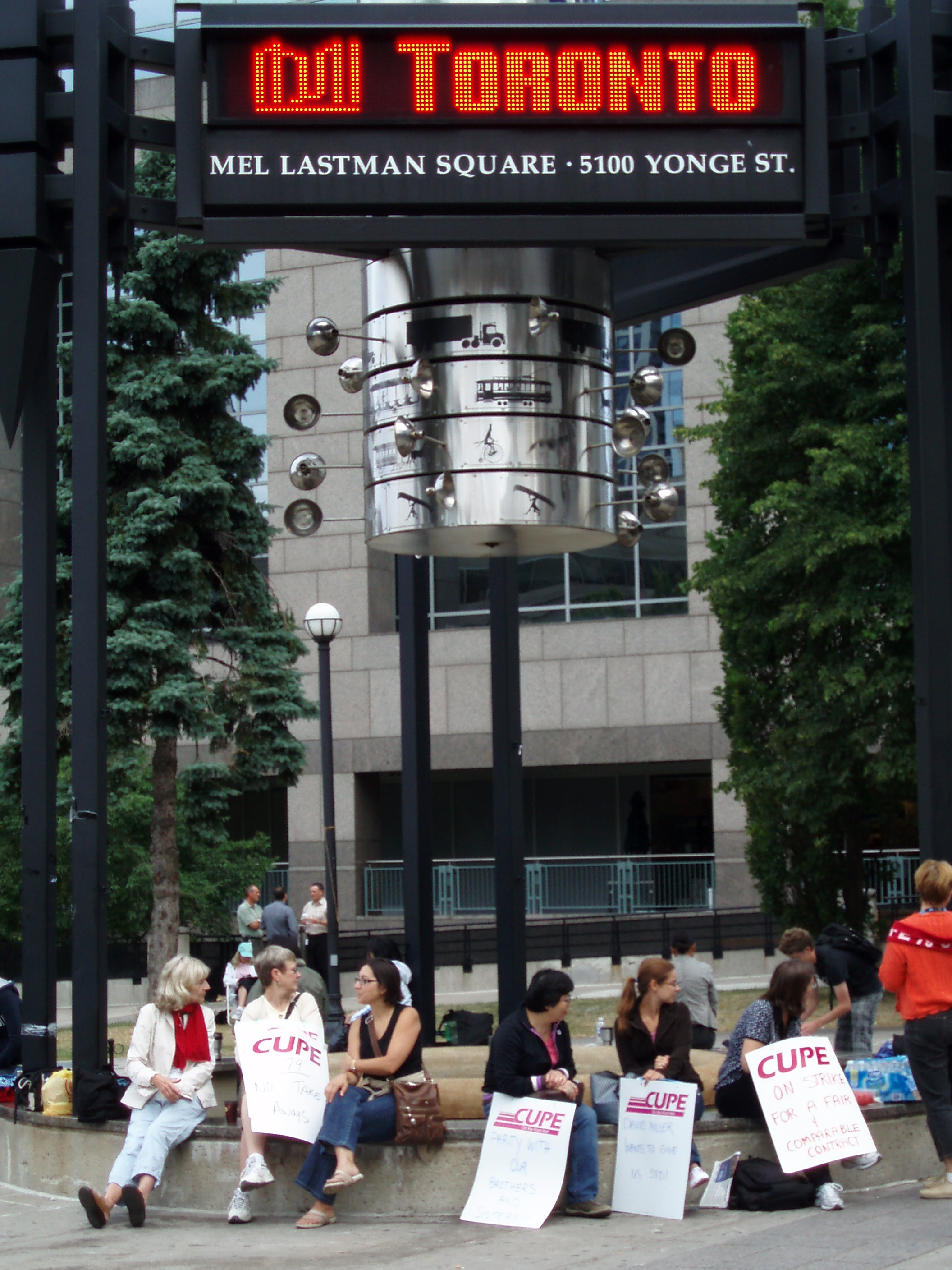
City of Toronto workers on strike.

The 2009 City of Toronto inside and outside workers strike (also known as the 2009 Toronto strike) was a legal strike action that was undertaken by the Toronto Civic Employees Union Local 416 and CUPE Local 79, two locals of the Canadian Union of Public Employees in the city of Toronto.

It involved approximately 24,000 city employees.

== Background ==
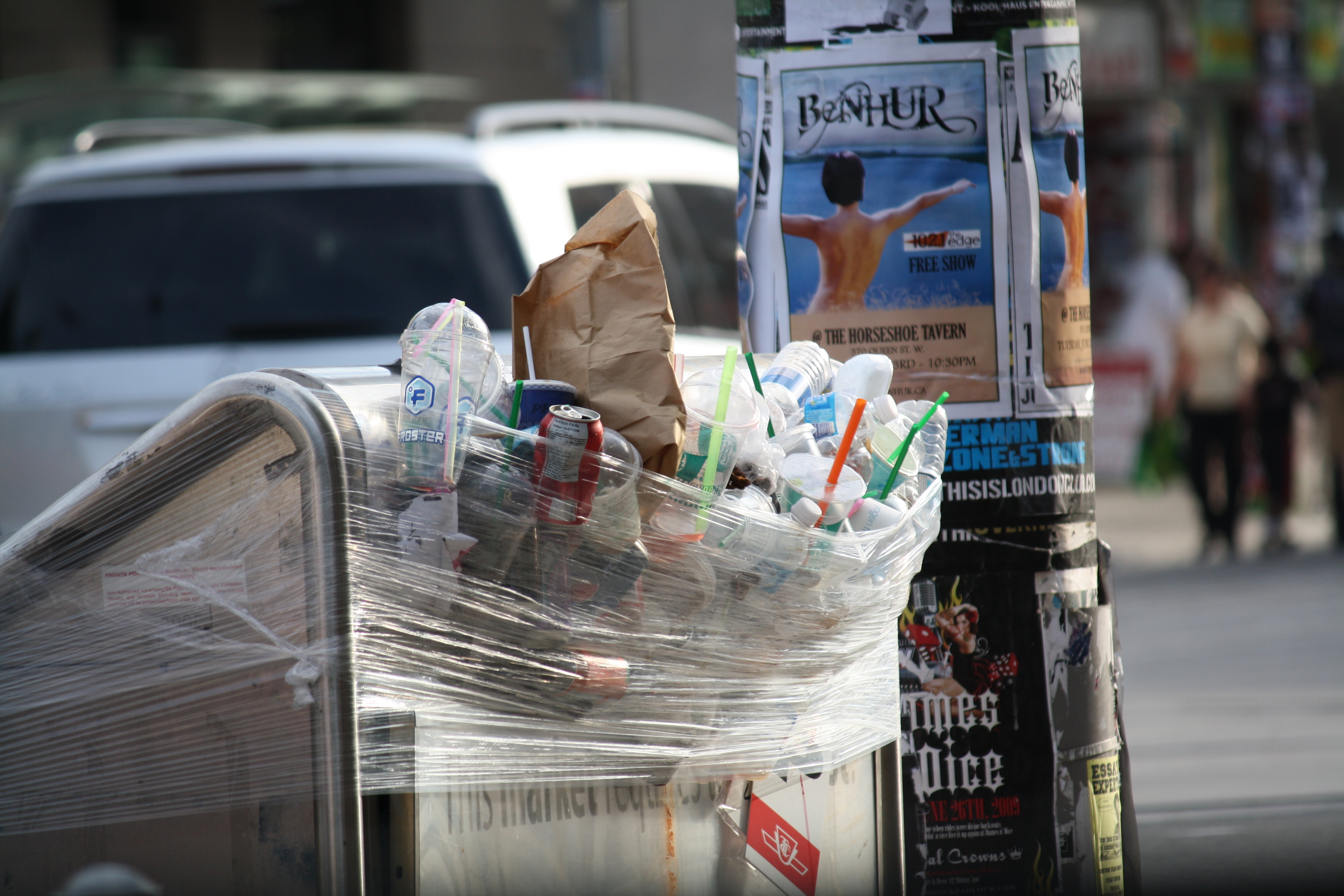
Trash seen being put into the plastic covering sealed trash bins on June 22.

On June 22 at midnight Toronto municipal workers belonging to two separate unions (CUPE Local 416 - representing the outside workers, and CUPE Local 79 - representing the inside workers) went on strike following six months negotiating with the municipality over contract renewal.

== Issues ==
The union said that the main issue for the strike were requests, from the city, for concessions from the union in the new contract.

According to the CBC, the main issues regarded changes to job security, seniority and the banking of sick days. The previous contract allowed some union members to bank unused sick days and cash them out upon retirement. The city proposed contract would have disallowed the practise.

CUPE Local 79 President, Ann Dembinski was quoted as saying "This is about getting a fair deal similar to what everyone else got. Everyone else was able to negotiate a collective agreement without huge takeaways. These are huge concessions. No other City of Toronto workforce has had to negotiate any concessions in order to get a collective agreement."

== Services affected ==
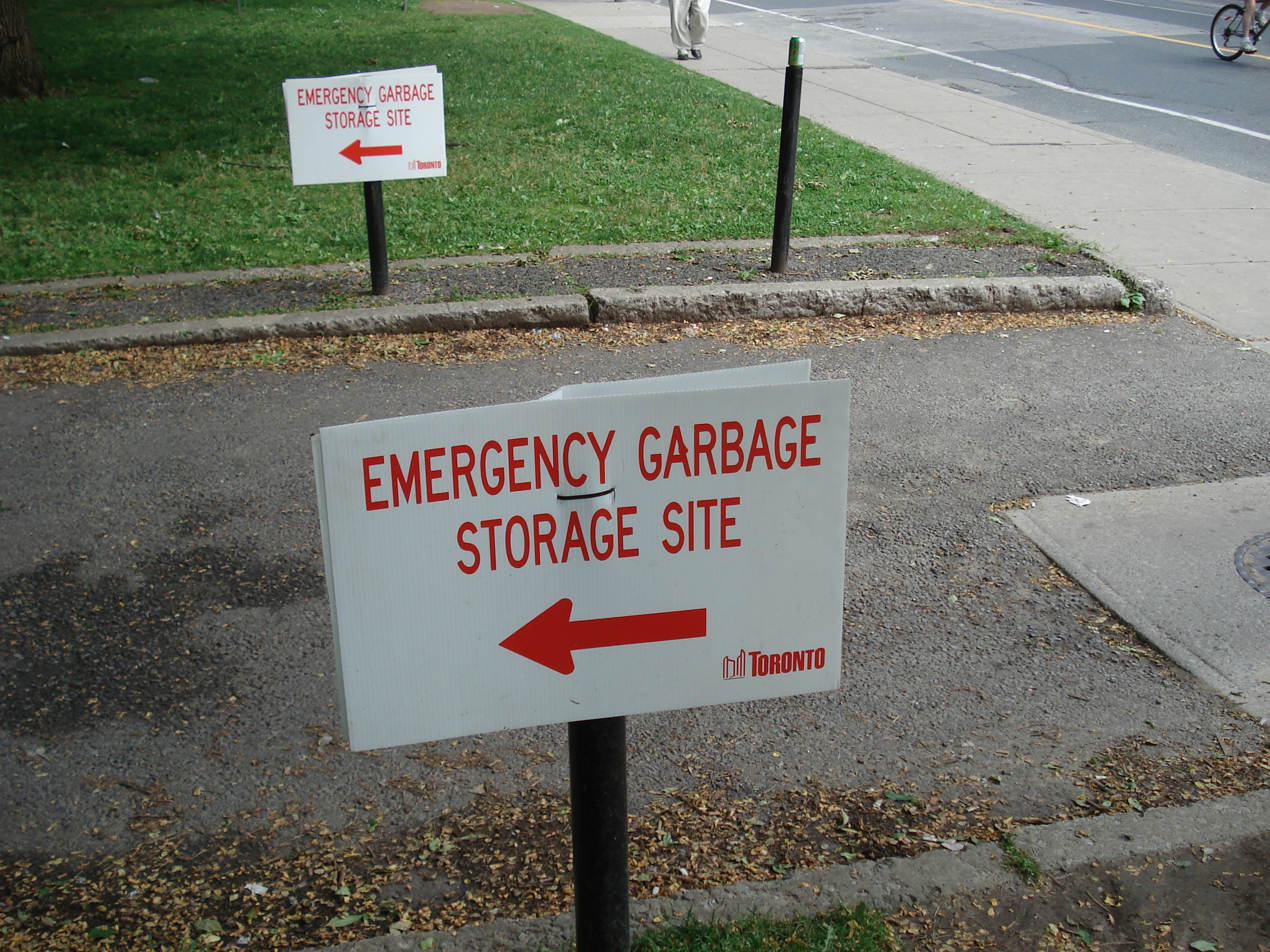
A sign points the way to the drop-off site at Moss Park

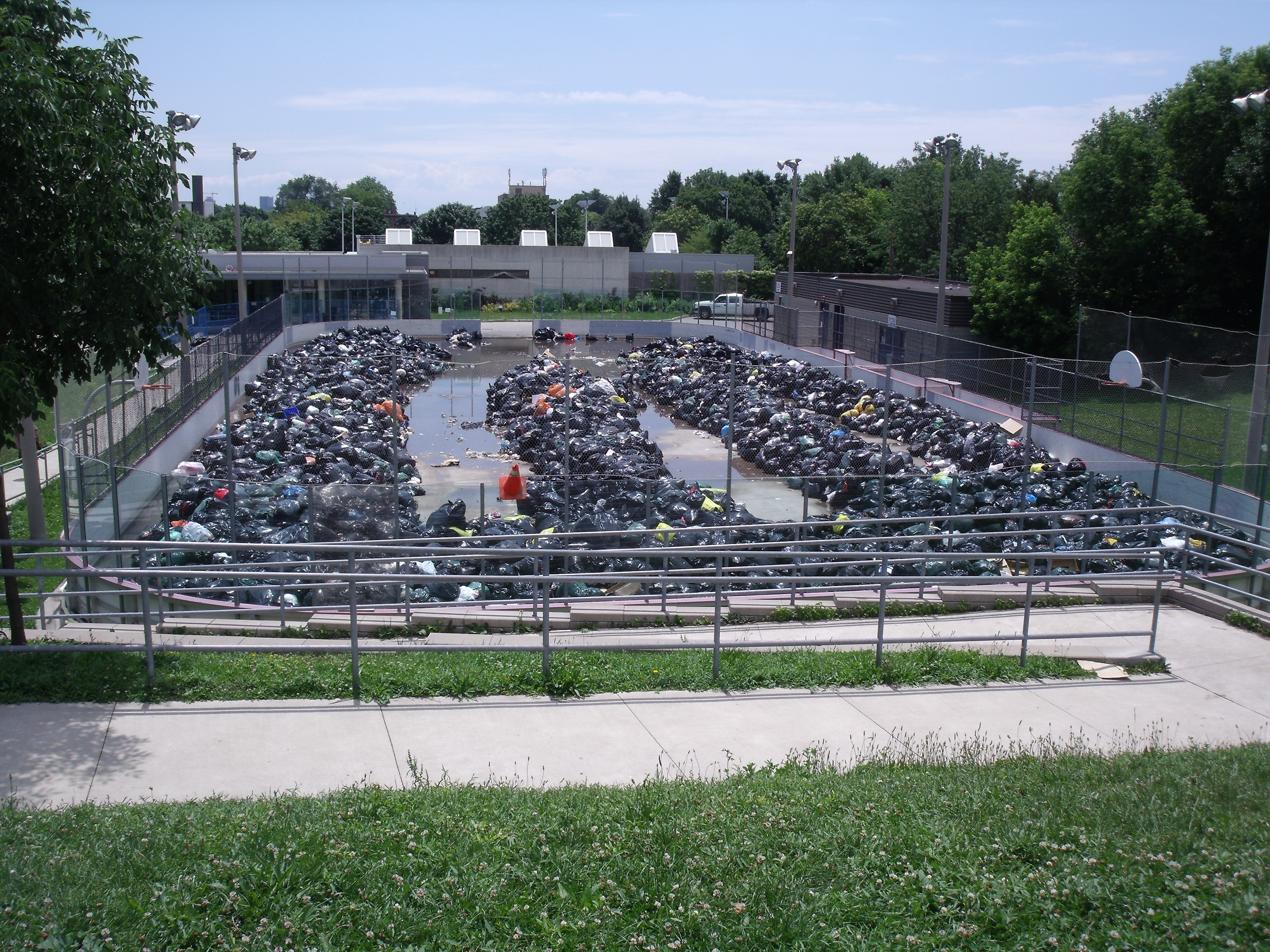
Temporary trash site at Christie Pits Park

Union members from Local 416 and Local 79 work in various departments within the city and the work stoppage affected many of their services, including:

- Garbage Collection - from single detached dwellings, low-rise residential dwellings and some small commercial businesses. An exception was that the former city of Etobicoke had contracted out these services before amalgamation, and thus these services in this area of the city were unaffected.
- Parks and Recreation - including city run pools and recreation facilities, grass cutting in parks and summer programmes. Toronto Island ferries halted for visitors and residents.
- City run daycare facilities.
- Municipal Licensing, including building permits, signage permits, taxi cab licenses and burlesque licenses. Marriage licenses were not affected.
- Public Health, including regular health inspections of restaurants, public pools, city beaches, city run health clinics and dental offices.
- Toronto EMS was partially affected, with ambulance services running at 75% capacity with priority calls unaffected.
- Water Supply/Water Treatment.
- Animal Services.

=== Garbage collection ===
The cessation of garbage collection was one of the more noticeable effects of the labour disruption. Four days into the strike the city announced 19 temporary garbage drop off locations for residential waste. This decision proved controversial in the neighbourhoods containing the sites as residents expressed concerns about pesticide and rodenticide spraying, as well as odour and leaching caused by the piles of garbage. Junk removal entrepreneurs took the opportunity to increase their customer base, specifically because plenty of residents were left without options to deal with their garbage.

== Final resolution ==
On July 27, after extensions to a union-imposed midnight deadline to reach an agreement, CUPE local 416 President Mark Ferguson announced that the union had "the basis for a deal" with the City of Toronto. Ferguson exhorted the city to turn its attention to resolving outstanding issues with the city's inside workers represented by 416's sister local, local 79.

The final vote by the council on the agreement put forward by the mayor resulted in 21 "yes" votes, 18 "no" votes, and 6 absences.

== See also ==
- 2009 City of Windsor inside and outside workers strike
- Mayor David Miller
