= Bayfield =

Bayfield may refer to:

== Places ==
=== Canada ===
- Bayfield, New Brunswick, an unincorporated community
- Bayfield, Nova Scotia, a village
- Bayfield, Ontario, a village
- Bayfield River in Ontario

=== United States ===
- Bayfield, Colorado, a town
- Bayfield, Missouri, a ghost town
- Bayfield, Wisconsin, a city
- Bayfield County, Wisconsin
- Bayfield (town), Wisconsin

=== Elsewhere ===
- Bayfield, Barbados, village
- Bayfield High School, Dunedin, New Zealand
- Bayfield, Norfolk, United Kingdom, a former civil parish
  - including Bayfield Hall

== Other uses ==
- Bayfield group, sandstone found in Wisconsin, United States
- Bayfield 25, a Canadian sailboat design
- Bayfield (surname)
