= Silver Creek (Huron County, Ontario) =

- Location of the mouth of Silver Creek in southern Ontario

Location
- Country: Canada
- Province: Ontario
- Region: Southwestern Ontario
- County: Huron County
- Municipality: Huron East

Physical characteristics
- Source: Field
  - coordinates: 43°33′15″N 81°20′31″W
  - elevation: 328 m (1,076 ft)
- Mouth: Bayfield River
  - location: Egmondville
  - coordinates: 43°32′11″N 81°23′58″W
  - elevation: 299 m (981 ft)

Basin features
- River system: Great Lakes Basin

Silver Creek is a river in the municipality of Huron East, Huron County, Ontario, Canada and a right tributary of the Bayfield River.

== Course ==
Silver Creek begins in a farm field northeast of the community of Seaforth at an elevation of 328 metres (1,076 ft). It flows southwest and takes in right and left tributary creeks before passing under Ontario Highway 8 on the east side of Seaforth. It continues southwest on the east side of the community, takes in two more left tributaries, and reaches its mouth at the Bayfield River at an elevation of 299 metres (981 ft) in the community of Egmondville.

== Ecology ==
The Ausable Bayfield Conservation Authority has rated the Upper Bayfield Headwaters, which includes Silver Creek, a "D" for forest conditions and a "C" for surface water quality. A monitoring point for Benthic zone marine invertebrates is located on the upper Silver Creek. No at-risk species have been identified in the drainage basin. Reforestation has been identified as the priority strategy for improving forest conductions and water quality.

== See also ==
- List of rivers of Ontario
