= Bayfield (surname) =

Bayfield is a surname. Notable people with the surname include:

- Fanny Amelia Bayfield (1813/4–1891), Canadian artist and educator
- Henry Wolsey Bayfield (1795–1885), Royal Navy Admiral and surveyor
- Laura Bayfield (born 1999), New Zealand rugby union footballer
- M. A. Bayfield (1852–1922), British priest and scholar
- Martin Bayfield, GB Lions & England rugby union player
- Richard Bayfield, English protesrant martyr
- Robert Bayfield, English physician
- St. Clair Bayfield (1875–1967), English stage actor
- Tony Bayfield (born 1946), British Reform rabbi
