= Bayfield Boat Yard =

Former Canadian sailboat manufacturer

Bayfield Boat Yard Limited
- Company type: Privately held company
- Industry: Boat building
- Founded: 1970
- Founder: Ted Gozzard
- Defunct: 1988
- Fate: Out of business
- Headquarters: Bayfield, Ontario, Canada
- Products: Sailboats
- Number of employees: 65

Bayfield Boat Yard Limited was a Canadian boat builder originally based in Bayfield, Ontario, and later in nearby Vanastra, Ontario. The company specialized in the design and manufacture of fibreglass sailboats. The company was founded by Ted Gozzard in 1970 and continued in business until a plant fire forced its closure in 1988.

All of the company's boat designs were optimized for cruising and included more headroom below decks than competitors. The company occupied a marketing niche, building boats with traditional sailing ship design features such as long keels, clipper bows, trailboards and bowsprits, all rendered in modern materials.

== History ==
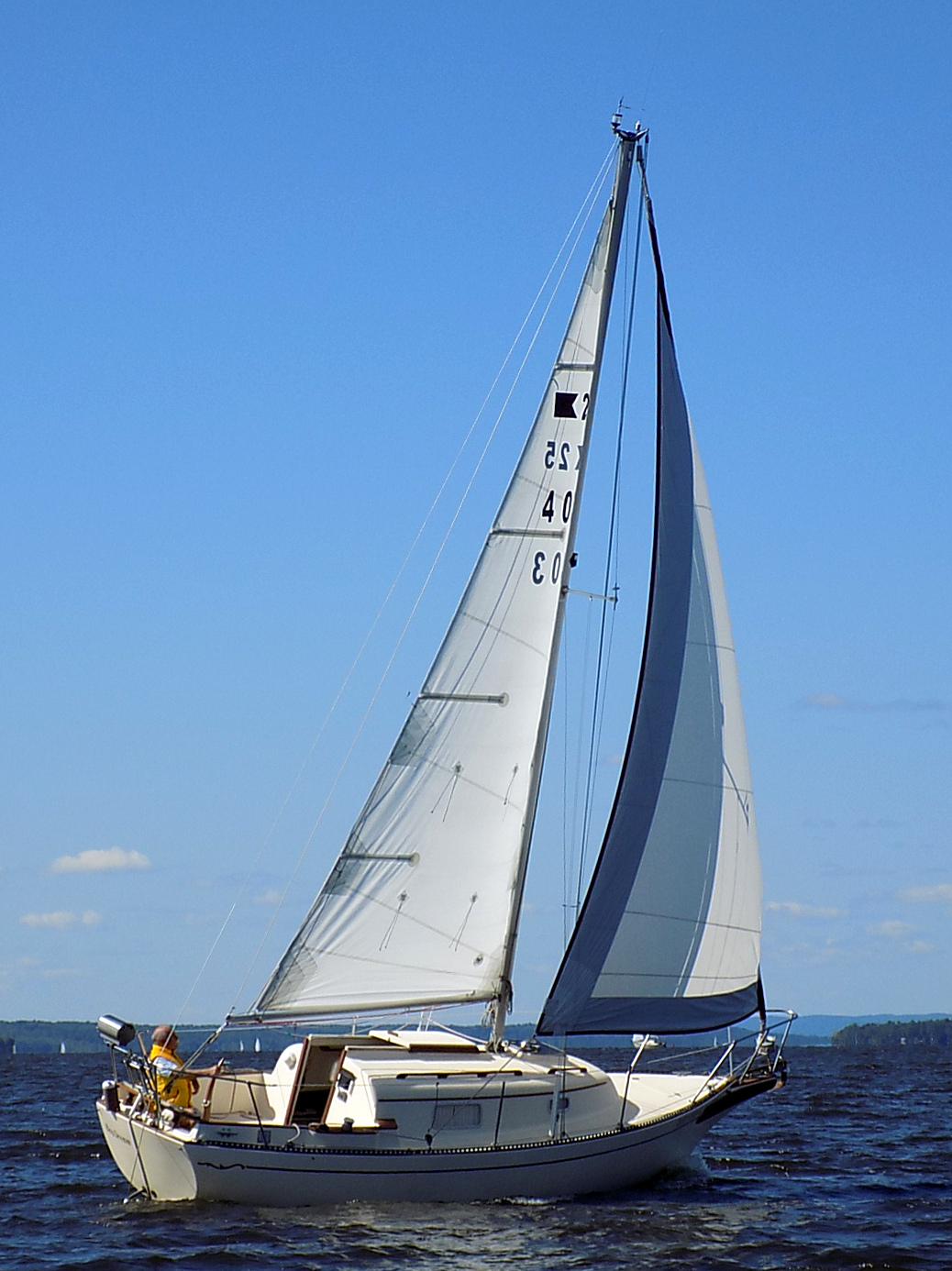
Bayfield 25

The first Ted Gozzard design produced was the Bayfield 23 in 1973, which evolved into the successful Bayfield 25 two years later. The Bayfield 25 was described by reviewer Michael McGoldrick as, "a true pocket cruising sailboat" and became known for its miniature traditional ship looks. The Bayfield 30/32 was also introduced in 1973 and was a faster boat than the other designs. The largest boat produced was the Bayfield 40 introduced in 1982, which used an unconventional cabin layout.

Ted Gozzard left the company in 1981 to found a new company, Gozzard Yachts, based in nearby Goderich, Ontario, and his younger brother, Haydn Gozzard, took over running Bayfield Boat Yard, including designing its final boat, the Bayfield 36. The cutter rigged 36 retained the original styling of Ted Gozzard's earlier designs.

The Bayfield factory outgrew its original location and moved to Clinton, Ontario, ultimately employing 65 people there. In 1988 a fire destroyed the plant and the business closed. A Bayfield dealer, Neptune Marine, along with some new partners, bought the Bayfield hull moulds and attempted to re-establish the business, but the effort did not succeed and went bankrupt after a few years.

In a June 1987 review of the Bayfield 36 in Canadian Yachting, writer Sven Donaldson described the Bayfield line aesthetic: "Prior to the 36, all the Bayfields except the ketch-rigged 40 have suffered from simply appearing too small. Their highly cambered cabins are overwhelmed by the curvaceous lines of the hulls. Although the 40 (45 feet overall) is to my eye the best-looking Bayfield model, the 36 is long enough to make the style work. By raising the sheerline amidships, compared to earlier Bayfields, designer Hayden Gozzard was able to lower the cabin profile to a small, but significant extent. The wine-glass stern is nicely drawn, and in my estimation is among the most attractive features of the boat."

== Boats ==
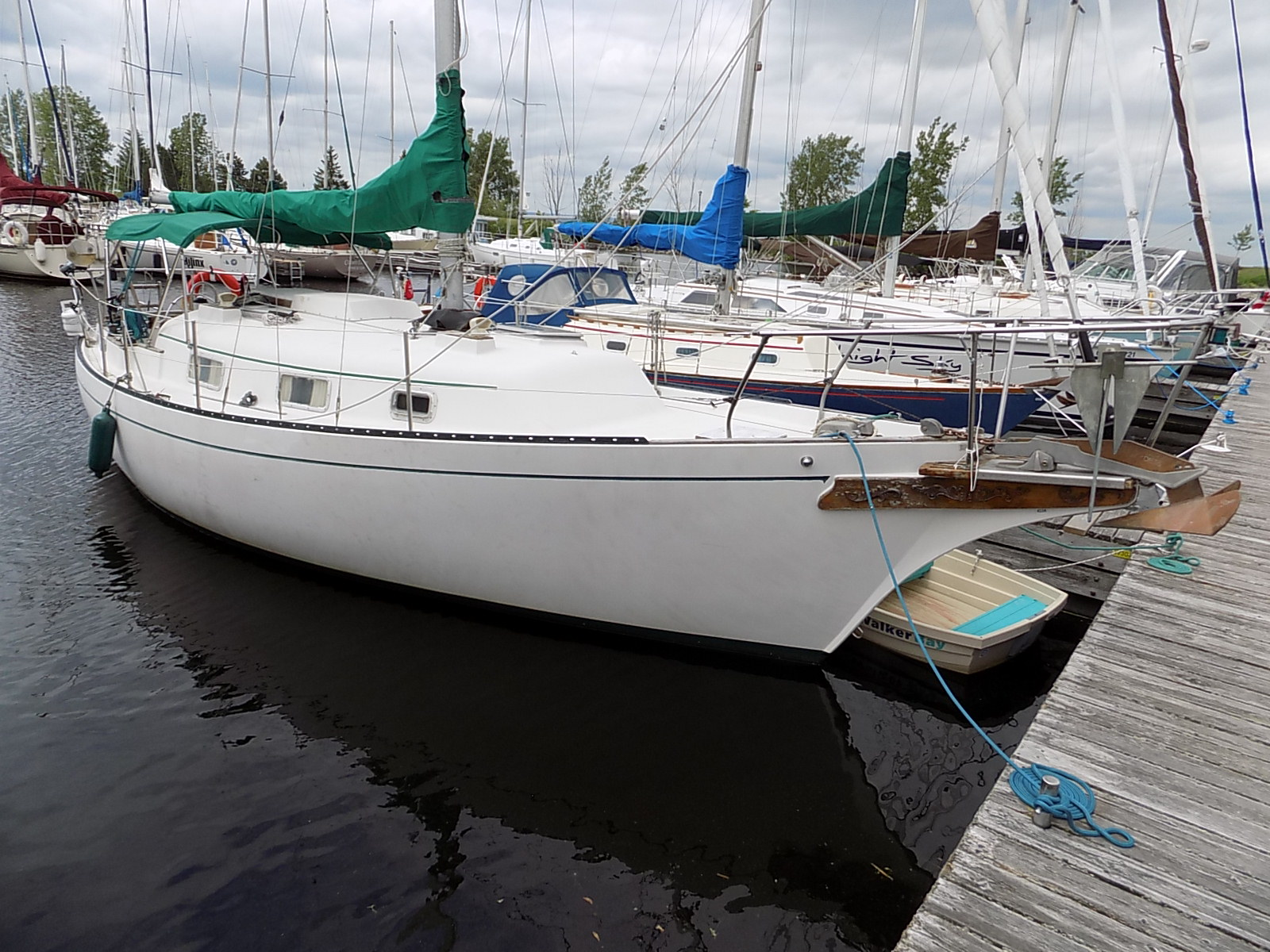
Bayfield 32

Summary of boats built by Bayfield Boat Yard:

- Bayfield 23 - 1973
- Bayfield 30/32 - 1973
- Bayfield 25 - 1975
- Bayfield 29 - 1978
- Bayfield 40 - 1982
- Bayfield 36 - 1984

== See also ==
- List of sailboat designers and manufacturers
