= Bayfield 36 =

Sailboat class

Development
- Designer: Haydn Gozzard
- Location: Canada
- Year: 1984
- Builder: Bayfield Boat Yard
- Role: Cruiser
- Name: Bayfield 36

Boat
- Displacement: 18,500 lb (8,391 kg)
- Draft: 5.00 ft (1.52 m)

Hull
- Type: Monohull
- Construction: Fibreglass
- LOA: 36.00 ft (10.97 m)
- LWL: 30.50 ft (9.30 m)
- Beam: 12.00 ft (3.66 m)
- Engine: Yanmar 4JHE 44 hp (33 kW) diesel engine

Hull appendages
- Keel: long keel
- Ballast: 6,500 lb (2,948 kg)
- Rudder: keel-mounted rudder

Rig
- Rig type: Cutter rig
- I foretriangle height: 48.00 ft (14.63 m)
- J foretriangle base: 20.50 ft (6.25 m)
- P mainsail luff: 39.60 ft (12.07 m)
- E mainsail foot: 13.75 ft (4.19 m)

Sails
- Sailplan: Cutter rig
- Mainsail area: 272.25 sq ft (25.293 m^{2})
- Jib/genoa area: 492.00 sq ft (45.708 m^{2})
- Total sail area: 764.25 sq ft (71.001 m^{2})

The Bayfield 36 is a Canadian sailboat that was designed by Haydn Gozzard for cruising and first built in 1984.

== Production ==
The design was built by Bayfield Boat Yard in Clinton, Ontario, Canada, starting in 1984, but the company went out of business in 1988 after a factory fire and production ended.

== Design ==
The Bayfield 36 is a recreational keelboat, built predominantly of fibreglass, with teak wood trim. It has a cutter rig, with anodized aluminum spars, a clipper bow with a bowsprit and trailboards, a raised counter transom, a keel-mounted rudder controlled by a wheel and a fixed long keel. It displaces 18,500 lb (8,391 kg) and carries 6,500 lb (2,948 kg) of encapsulated lead ballast.

The boat has a draft of 5.00 ft (1.52 m) with the standard keel.

The boat is fitted with a Japanese Yanmar 4JHE four-cylinder diesel engine of 44 hp (33 kW), with a 2.17:1 reduction gearbox for docking and manoeuvring. The fresh water tank has a capacity of 100 U.S. gallons (380 L; 83 imp gal).

The design has sleeping accommodation for seven people, with double berths in the bow and aft private cabins and settee berths for three in the main cabin with an L-shaped dinette table. The galley is located on the starboard side and is equipped with a two-burner alcohol-fired stove, an electric refrigerator and a deep stainless steel sink with hot and cold pressure fresh water and a sea water pump. A navigation station is provided. The head includes a shower. The cabin sole is teak and holly. Below deck headroom is 6.25 ft (1.91 m).

Ventilation is provided by an opening hatch over the galley, opening ports and a butterfly skylight in the main salon. The forward stateroom has two opening hatches and one opening port. The aft stateroom has one opening port and one opening hatch. All ports and hatches have insect screens.

For sailing, the design is equipped with four Lewmar #40 primary winches, two Lewmar #16 mainsheet winches, three #16 halyard winches and a single #8 Lewmar reefing winch.

== Operational history ==
Sven Donaldson reviewed the Bayfield 36 in 1987 for Canadian Yachting, noting "the aesthetics of a beautiful boat could be argued endlessly, but in the final analysis some folks will always love the Bayfield look while other won't. It's easy to argue that the Bayfield 36 is a robust, up-to-date cruising boat that is capable of giving good service to a couple and their guests or a small family. As the average sailboat gets to look more and more like a space probe, it's refreshing to have a few builders around who choose to buck the tide. For some like Bayfield, variety is not only the spice of life, but a sound business principle."

Marine Surveyor Richard Jordan reviewed the Bayfield 36 in 2009, writing, "certain styles never go away. There is always the lure of the pirate ships of old with their trailboards, bowsprits, and clipper bows. And at every sailor’s essence are certain pirate ideas, the romance of adventures on the high seas. The look speaks of journeys to far off lands for exciting adventures ... These 36-footers have an excellent reputation in Canada, more well known than here in the USA. Her interior is arguably the largest you will find on a 36-foot sailboat. The roomy accommodations combined with her offshore sailing pedigree make her one of the best choices around in this range for a serious offshore yacht."

== See also ==
- List of sailing boat types

Similar sailboats

- C&C 36-1
- C&C 36R
- Catalina 36
- Columbia 36
- Coronado 35
- CS 36
- Ericson 36
- Frigate 36
- Hinterhoeller F3
- Hunter 36
- Invader 36
- Nonsuch 36
- Portman 36
- Seidelmann 37
- Vancouver 36 (Harris)
- Watkins 36
- Watkins 36C
