= Bayfield 25 =

Canadian keelboat built 1975–1984

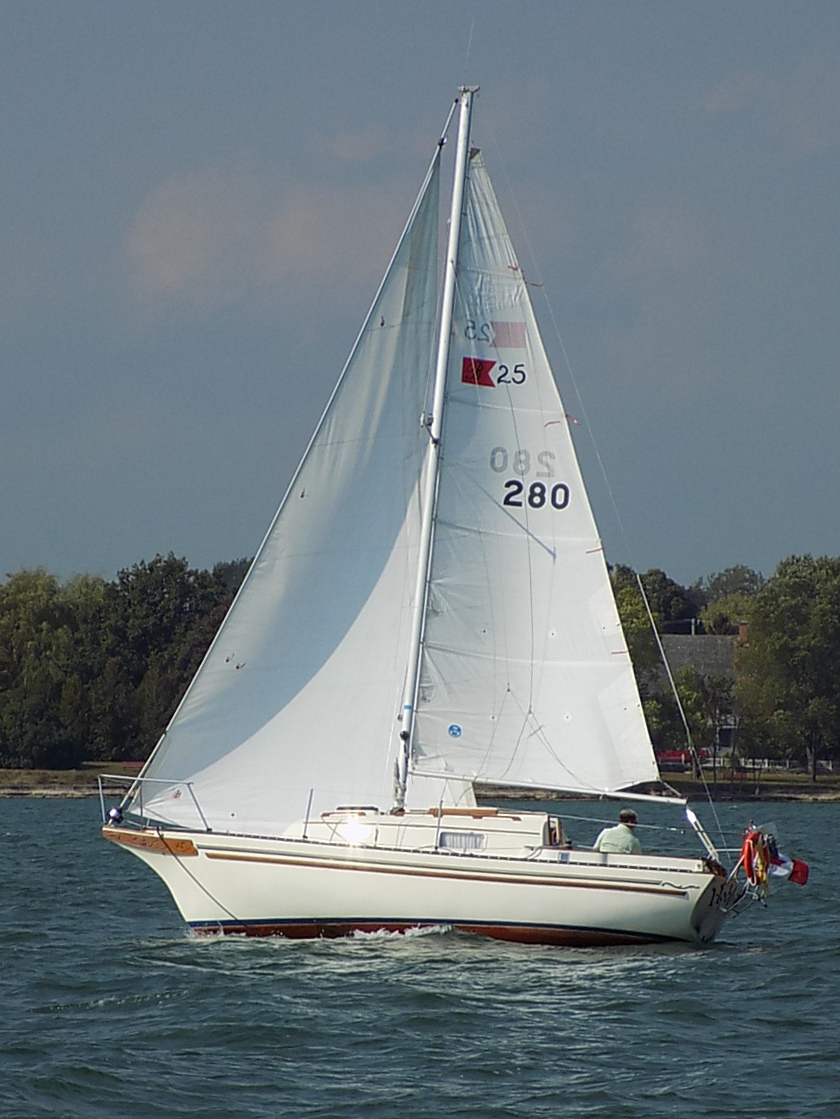

Development
- Designer: Ted Gozzard
- Location: Canada
- Year: 1975
- Builder: Bayfield Boat Yard
- Name: Bayfield 25

Boat
- Displacement: 3,500 lb (1,588 kg)
- Draft: 2.92 ft (0.89 m)

Hull
- Type: Monohull
- Construction: Fiberglass
- LOA: 25.00 ft (7.62 m)
- LWL: 19.67 ft (6.00 m)
- Beam: 8.00 ft (2.44 m)
- Engine: Petters diesel engine

Hull appendages
- Keel: Long keel
- Ballast: 1,300 lb (590 kg)
- Rudder: keel-mounted rudder

Rig
- General: Masthead sloop
- I foretriangle height: 30.00 ft (9.14 m)
- J foretriangle base: 11.00 ft (3.35 m)
- P mainsail luff: 24.80 ft (7.56 m)
- E mainsail foot: 10.00 ft (3.05 m)

Sails
- Mainsail area: 124.00 sq ft (11.520 m^{2})
- Jib/genoa area: 165.00 sq ft (15.329 m^{2})
- Total sail area: 289.00 sq ft (26.849 m^{2})

Racing
- PHRF: 261 (average)

The Bayfield 25 is a recreational keelboat built by the Bayfield Boat Yard between 1975 and 1984 in Bayfield, Ontario, Canada.

Originally marketed as the Bayfield 23, in 1975 it was advertised as the Bayfield 23/25 and in 1976 as the Bayfield 25.

Designed by Ted Gozzard, the fiberglass hull has a clipper bow with a bowsprit, wooden decorative trailboards on the bow, a keel-mounted rudder and a long shoal keel. Steering is by a tiller with a wheel optional. It has a hull speed of 5.94 kn (11.00 km/h).

Features include an anchor locker, internal halyards, a 4:1 aft mainsheet with a traveller, slab-reefing, jib tracks and two cockpit jib winches. A halyard winch was a factory option.

Accommodation consists of a "V"-berth in the bow, twin settee berths and a starboard berth that runs under the vanity and locker. An alcohol-fired stove stores under the starboard berth, and an icebox is under the port side quarter berth. The head is located on the port side and includes a 20 U.S. gallons (76 L; 17 imp gal) holding tank. The cabin has 5' 9" headroom. The cockpit is small.

Originally produced with two cabin port lights per side, a third was added in 1984.

It has a masthead sloop rig.

== Gallery ==
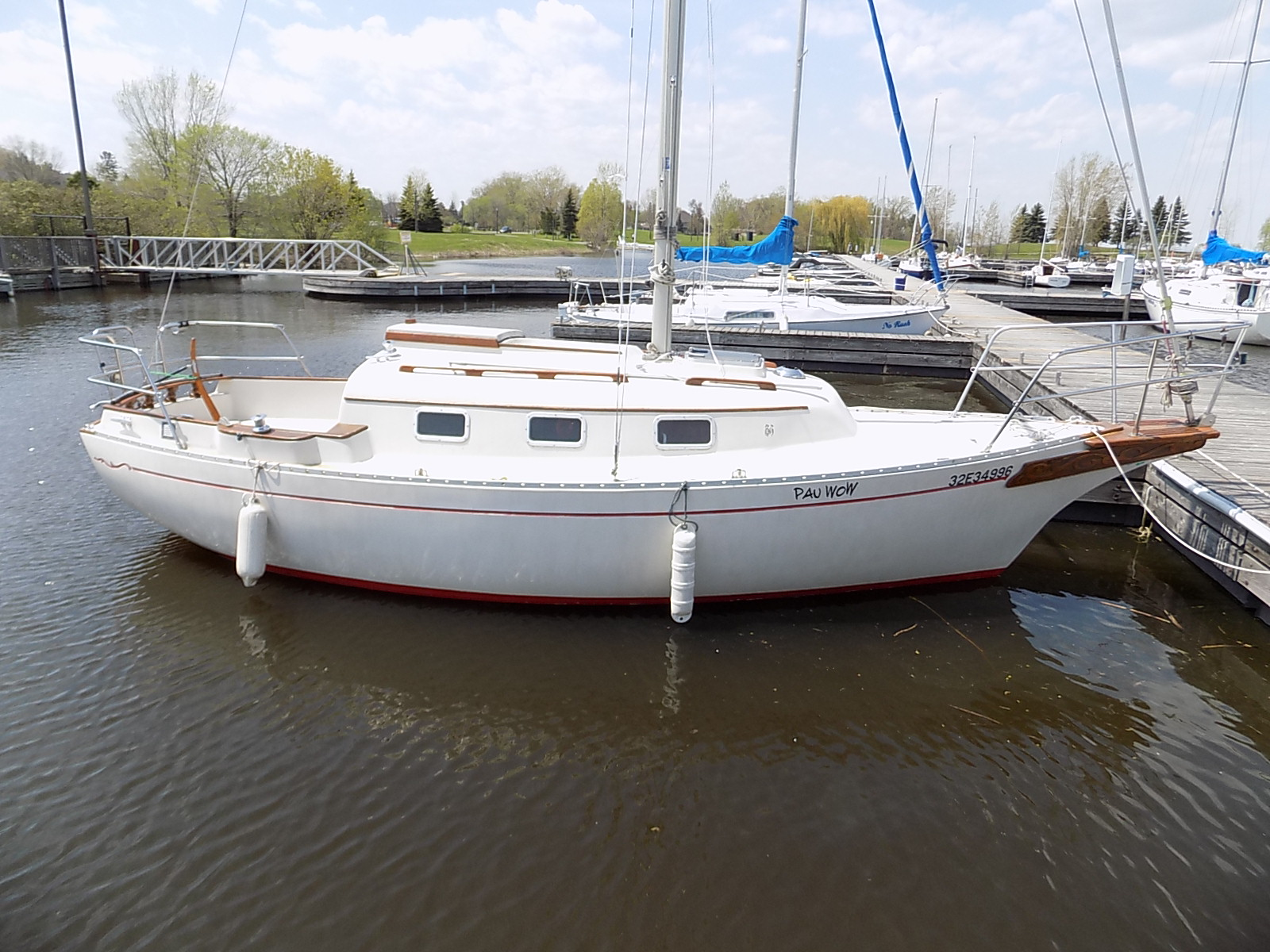

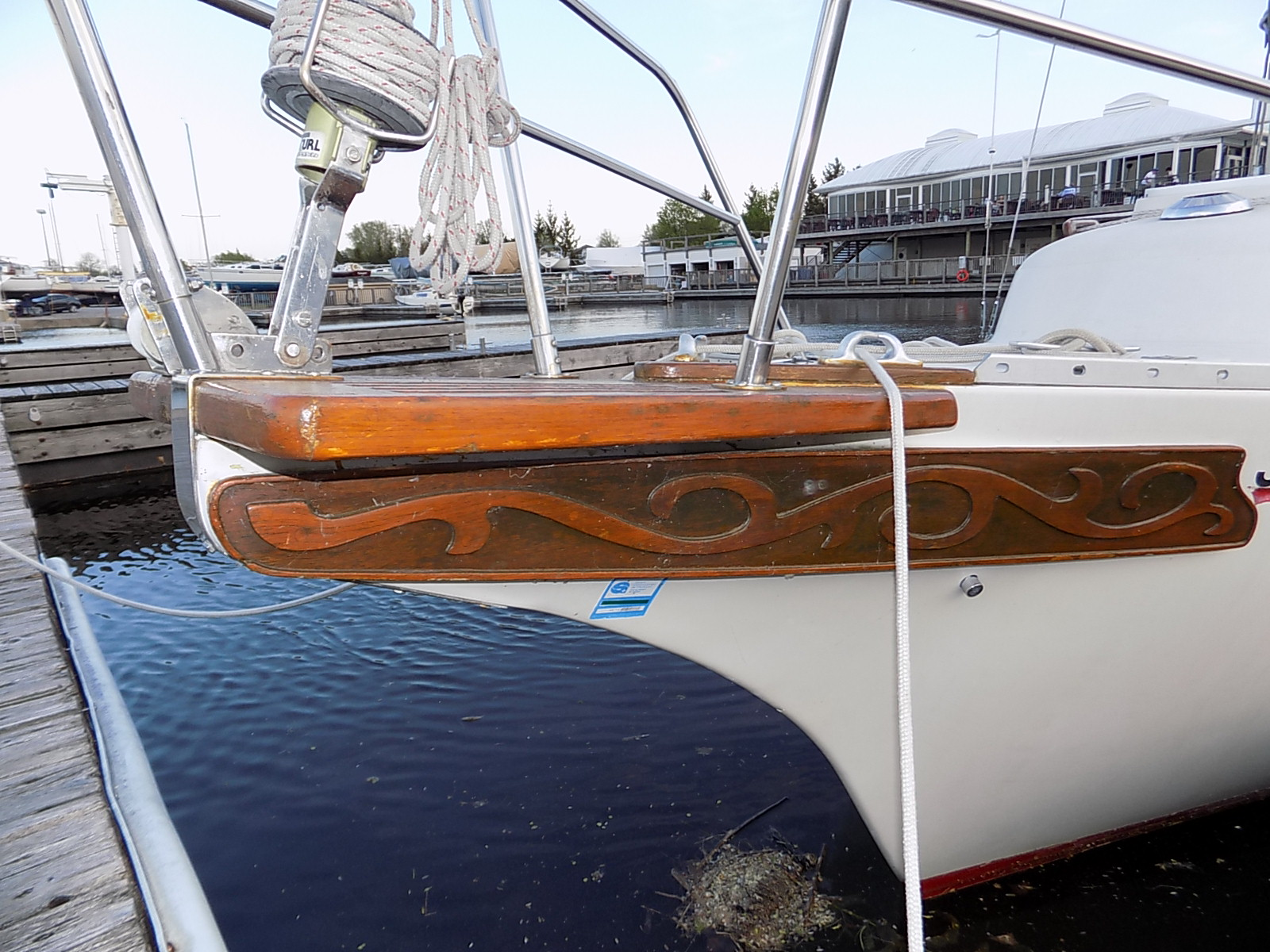
Bowsprit and trailboard
