= H. Isabel Graham =

Canadian poet

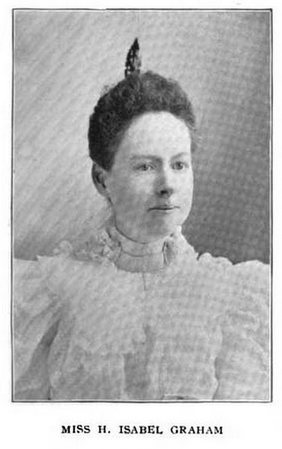
H. Isabel Graham, from a 1907 publication.

H. Isabel Graham (May 13, 1869 — October 29, 1941) was a Canadian poet.

== Early life ==
Hannah Isabel Graham was born at Harpurhey, near Seaforth, Ontario. the daughter of the Rev. William G. Graham, a Presbyterian minister, and Elizabeth Gouinlock. Her parents were both from Scotland. Graham wrote a pamphlet, "Fifty Years of Presbyterianism in Egmondville" (1896), about her father's work. H. Isabel Graham studied piano, pipe organ, and harmony at the Toronto College of Music.

== Career ==
Graham's poetry was published in Canadian and American newspapers and magazines, and collected in the volumes A Song of December and Other Poems (1904), Saint Ignace and Other Poems (1934), and Be of Good Cheer (1939). She sometimes used Scottish English vocabulary, spelling, and other features of the dialect. Themes were religious or patriotic, with titles including "There's Aye a Something", "Does Memory Live?" "No Country's Like Our Own Dear Land", "The Prodigal Child", "The Crown", "To Those Who Wait" "To An Invalided Soldier", "The Christmas Ship", and "Open the Door".

== Personal life ==
Hannah Isabel Graham died in 1941, aged 72 years. Her gravesite (under the name "Hannah Isabella Graham") is with those of her parents, at Egmondville, Ontario.
