= Ted Gozzard =

British yacht designer

- Born: June 13, 1933; Sheffield, West Riding of Yorkshire, England
- Died: May 15, 2014 (aged 80); Bayfield, Ontario, Canada
- Citizenship: Canadian
- Occupation: yacht builder
- Years active: 1970 - 2009
- Employer(s): Bayfield Boat Yard; North Castle Marine Ltd./Gozzard Yachts
- Known for: yacht construction
- Spouse: Janet
- Children: Mike; Wes

Hedley (Ted) Gozzard (13 June 1933 – 15 May 2014) was a British yacht designer and builder.

Gozzard was raised in Sheffield, England, where he apprenticed as a carpenter-joiner and gradually earned his journeyman’s papers in boat building, masonry and carpentry. Gozzard served in the Royal Air Force for a number of years as an airframe mechanic.

On leaving the RAF in 1959 Gozzard came to Ontario and worked in the construction business in London, Ontario, where he designed and supervised the construction of homes and subdivisions. In his spare time he built and sailed a much modified Thunderbird. Giving in to an urge to sail full time, Gozzard and his wife, Jan, and their two young sons made the Caribbean their home for two full years.

== 45' Trimaran Manta ==
In the Caribbean the Gozzard and family experienced multihull sailing for the first time, enjoying the speed combined with space and shoal draft. When the family moved back to Canada, Gozzard designed and built the 45 feet (14 m) trimaran, Manta in London, Ontario. In the early part of 1970 Gozzard relocated to the Village of Bayfield, Ontario. One of the main reasons for residing in Bayfield was to carry out testing on Manta. Gozzard had built this trimaran for the sole purpose of returning to the Bahamas aboard a boat with good living space for a family of four and a tutor.

A quote from the Gozzard Yachts website:

Once a few people saw the rather unique trimaran (remember this is 1970 and multihull were taboo), Ted’s skills as a boat builder were apparent and all of a sudden “boats” became a large part of our lives. Bayfield Boat Yard followed shortly as the company Ted was doing business as. By 1972/3 BBY evolved from a boat yard into Bayfield Boat Yard Limited, which was the manufacturing company, with the help of Gary Ferguson who ordered the first 10 Bayfield 23s. The B23 was specifically designed to be Ted’s solution to Gary’s concept for a pocket cruiser. Gary eventually became one of the original partners and if anyone deserves credit for helping start BBY it is Gary Ferguson.

In 1970 Gozzard became involved with designing and building a schooner named Twilight which was built on the waterfront in Bayfield. The Twilight was advertised, and many inquiries came. One individual who inquired wanted to build a smaller version of the Twilight. This smaller version, at 23 feet (7.0 m), later to be called the Bayfield 25, was the start of the Bayfield line of yachts.

== Bayfield Boat Yard ==
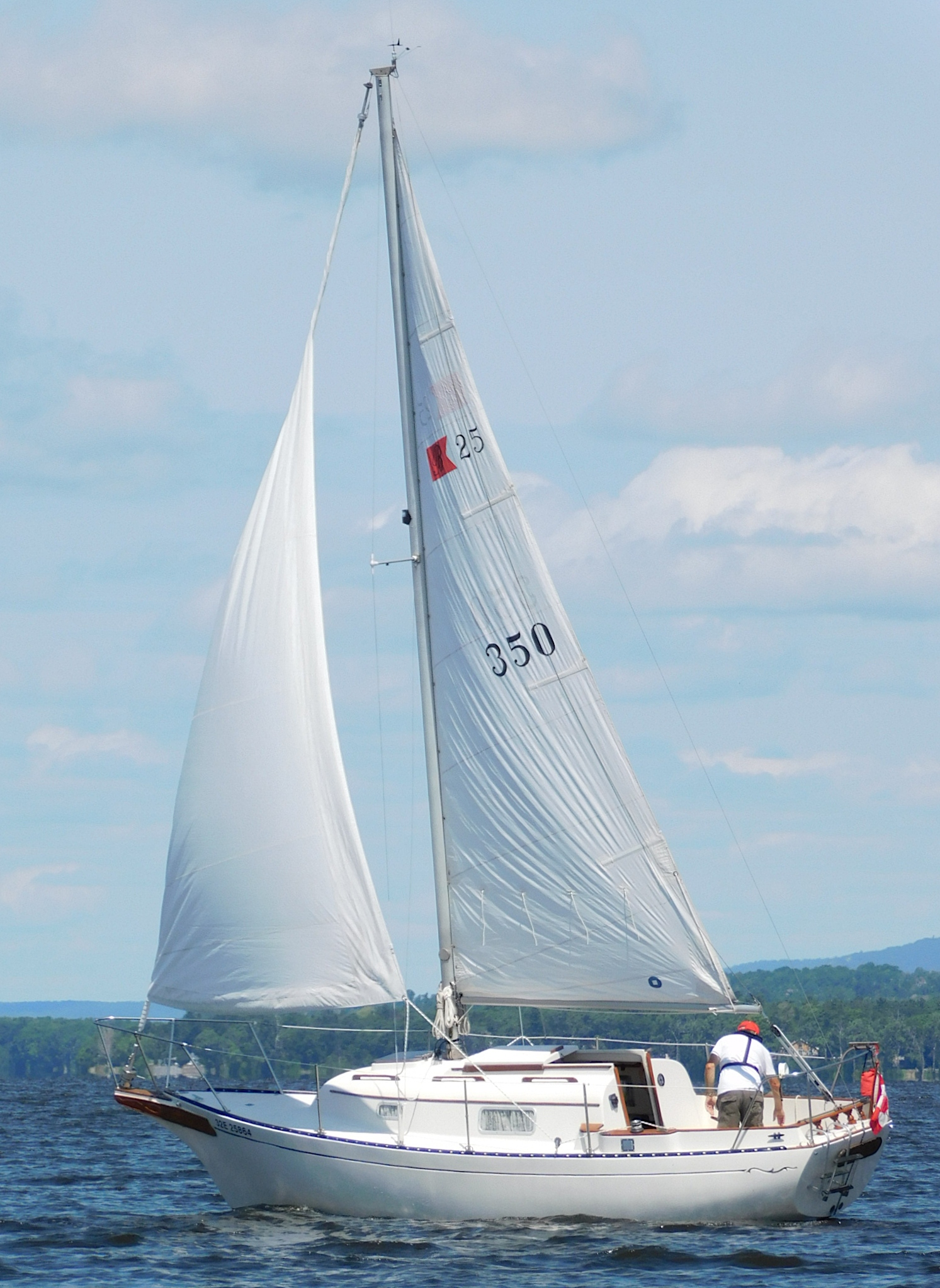
Bayfield 25

Gozzard continued designing and building cruising yachts, in the early days also repairing canoes, building fibreglass cowlings for snowmobiles and the odd “OK” Dinghy. In 1970 Gozzard founded Bayfield Boat Yard Ltd. (BBY) in Bayfield, Ontario. The Bayfield 23/25 was the first model produced.

Gozzard designed by carving a wooden hull model, believing that while computers are capable of a great deal, they can't predict exactly how a hull will perform once built. Gozzard felt a trained eye had a better chance of producing a beautiful boat. Gozzard also offered to modify any aspect of a Bayfield boat for an existing owner as part of his design services, at no charge.

== North Castle Marine Ltd. ==
Gozzard sold his interest in Bayfield in July 1981 and shortly thereafter, in February 1982, North Castle Marine Ltd./Gozzard Yachts in Goderich, Ontario was founded. At North Castle Marine Ltd/Gozzard Yachts, the Pilgrim 40 motor yacht was designed and built, with the line of sailing yachts now known as Gozzard Yachts soon following. Gozzard Yachts went on to produce sailboats in 31', 36', 37', 41' and 44' designs.

In 1983 Gozzard's two sons joined the company. Mike, the eldest, plays an active role in all aspects of the company as the production manager. Wes began as the Company's upholsterer and now commissions and delivers boats. Mike's wife Elizabeth (Liz) holds the position of purchase manager.

In 2009 Gozzard suffered a stroke but remained active in the business, coming into the office three days a week.

== Death ==
Gozzard died peacefully at his home on Thursday, 15 May 2014 at age 80.

== Boat designs ==
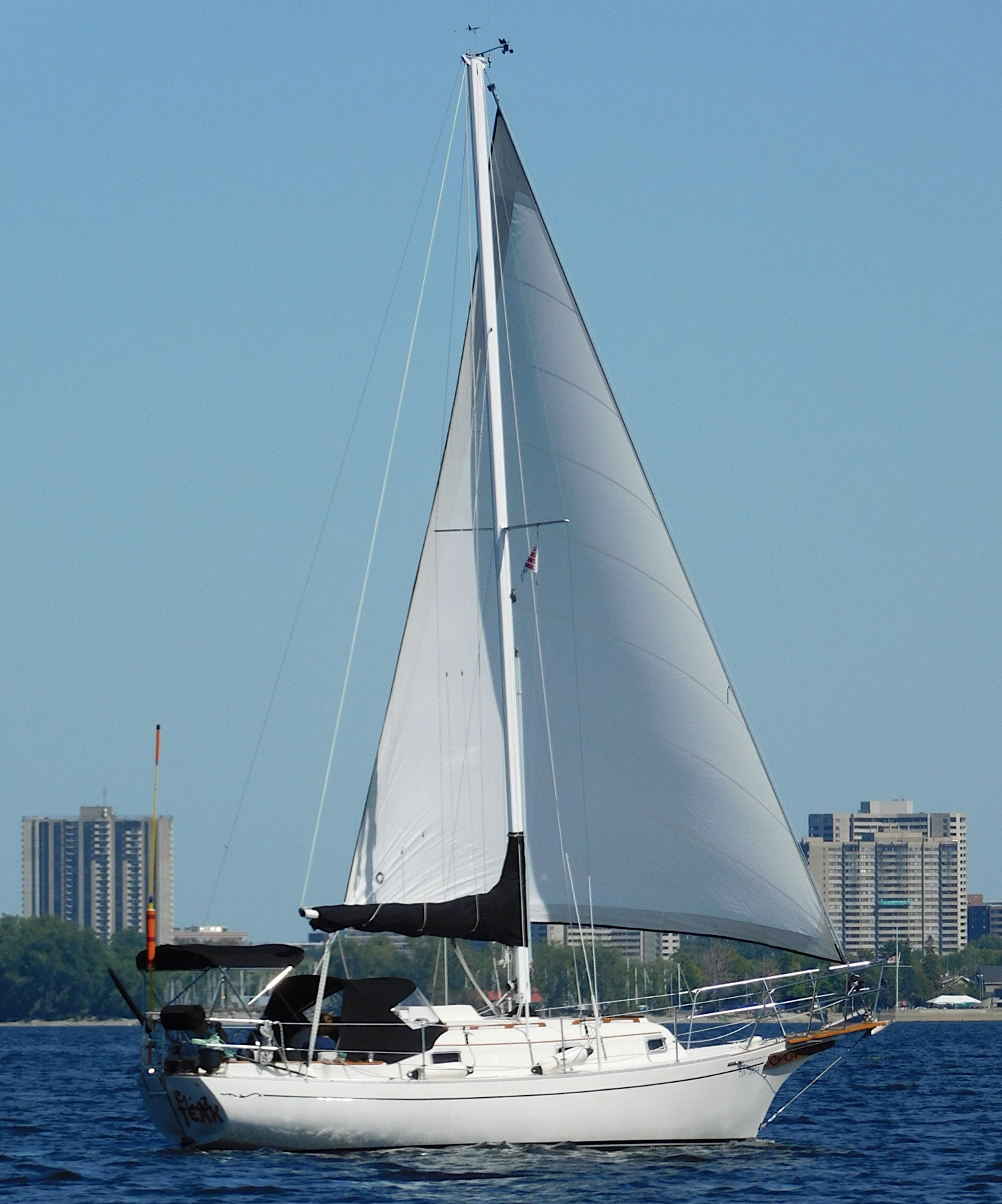
Bayfield 30/32

- Bayfield 25
- Bayfield 29
- Bayfield 30/32
- Bayfield 40
- Gozzard 31
- Gozzard 36
- Gozzard 37
- Gozzard 41
- Gozzard 44
- North Castle 36
- Pilgrim 40

== See also ==
- List of sailboat designers and manufacturers
