= Cantin (surname) =

Cantin is a French surname common in Canada. Notable people with the name include:

- Narcisse Cantin (1870–1940), founder of Johnson's Mills, a failed planned community in Ontario, Canada
- Jean-Charles Cantin (1918–2005), Canadian politician
- Marc Cantin (1933–1990), Canadian physician and professor
- Paolo Fernandes Cantin
- Serge Cantin (born 1945), Canadian bobsledder
- Jean Pierre Cantin (born 1966), Canadian judoka
- Sylvie Cantin (born 1970), Canadian speed skater
- Dave Cantin (born 1979), American entrepreneur
- Geoffrey Cantin-Arku (born 1998), Canadian football player
