= Anthony Van Egmond =

Canadian rebel (1778–1838)

Anthony Van Egmond (born Antonij Jacobi Willem Gijben, 10 March 1778 – 5 January 1838) was purportedly a Dutch Napoleonic War veteran. He became one of the first settlers and business people in the Huron Tract in present-day southwestern Ontario Canada. Van Egmond became an early contractor employed by the Canada Company to construct the original 74-kilometre (46 mi) road into the new settlement, allowing the entry of settlers for the purchase of company lands and further economic development. He eventually became a supporter of William Lyon Mackenzie and led a force of armed rebels in their unsuccessful skirmish at Montgomery's Tavern near Toronto on 7 December 1837, during the Upper Canada Rebellion.

== Life ==
Anthony van Egmond was born in Groesbeek in the Netherlands, the son of Johannes Arnoldus Gijben and his wife Maria Bloem. When he was twelve years old, his father was murdered. Alleged criminal activity forced him to flee around 1795 to Germany, where he assumed another identity, which included adoption of a false claim of descent from the Van Egmonds, an aristocratic family of the Netherlands. In 1819, attracted by the prospect of purchasing land from the Holland Land Company, he travelled, via Amsterdam, Liverpool, and Philadelphia, to Indiana, Pennsylvania. The land, which he purchased in 1826, was eventually seized and sold at auction to cover unpaid taxes.

== The Canada Company ==
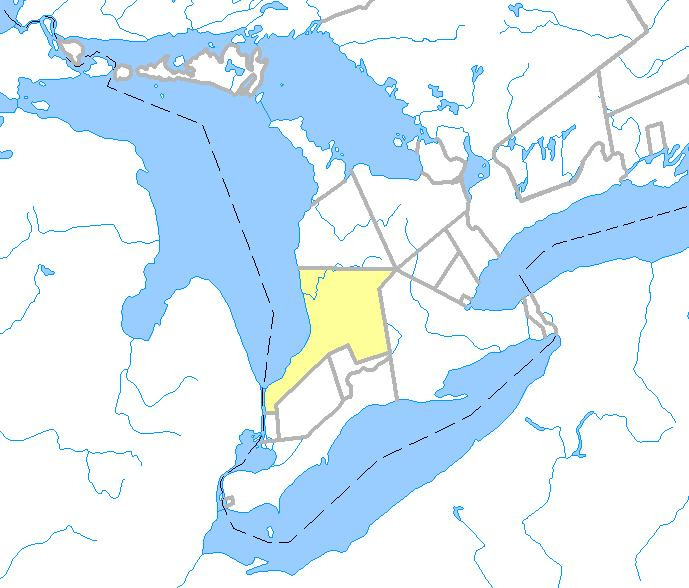
Huron Tract Purchase area, located in southern Ontario, highlighted in yellow

In 1828 he emigrated to Oxford Township East, in Upper Canada, where he purchased 200 acres (809,000 m^{2}) of land from the Canada Company. Because of the establishment of a personal friendship with local company official John Galt, Van Egmond came to the attention of other Canada Company executives and was subsequently employed by the company as the initial primary contractor for road construction in the Huron Tract. Van Egmond was also charged with establishing a series of inns to be positioned at twenty miles (32 km) intervals along the Huron Road, which were to act as nightly stopping and resupplying points for the arriving settlers.

Although Van Egmond continued to complete his contractual obligations to the Canada Company, he continually resented that the Company insisted on paying all fees in the form of one-third cash and two-thirds company 'land credits', redeemable in exchange for parcels of land already owned by the company. Van Egmond found himself having to expend his own funds in order to achieve Canada Company development goals. At that time, the land credits he was paid with were only immediately redeemable in cash for a fraction of their stated value, because of the undeveloped condition of the lands involved. Because of this arrangement, by the early 1830s, Van Egmond had personally accumulated 13,000 acres (53 km^{2}) of land in the Huron Tract, including 700 acres (2.8 km^{2}) located in the central area of what is today the city of Stratford, Ontario. In August 1830, Van Egmond's wife, Marie Susanne Elizabeth Dietz Van Egmond, ceremonially cut and bound the first sheaf of wheat harvested in the Huron Tract, at a gathering on their family farm on the Huron Road, which included local Canada Company officials and other regional businessmen.

Van Egmond became increasingly disgruntled at what he perceived as the Canada Company's failure to expend obligated amounts of money from the Huron Tract Improvement Fund for the development of local roads and other infrastructure, as well as at what he believed was the company's disregard for the general well-being of the arriving settlers. It's interesting to note that Van Egmond's views appear to be at least partially vindicated by an uncompleted judicial review conducted by Justice Jonas T.W. Jones in 1840. In his report Jones upheld Van Egmond's position that the Canada Company's practice of paying debts, partially in cash and partially in 'land credits', did not abide with the terms of the company's original purchase agreement, when they acquired the lands from the Crown.

== Reform politics ==
Van Egmond began to voice his concerns by corresponding with William Lyon Mackenzie, a radical reformer who published a newspaper, the Colonial Advocate, in Upper Canada's capital York. In January 1835, Van Egmond organized the Huron Union Society which met in the homes of recent settlers in the region. Its purpose was primarily to agitate for changes to Canada Company's policies and business practices in the Huron District, however their stated aims also included demands for a more responsible government in the province, where control of public revenues would be in the hands of elected, rather than appointed officials. The Society also called for the immediate sale of all remaining Clergy reserves and an end to what they saw as government sponsored monopolies, such as the Canada Company itself. It was also in 1835, that Van Egmond was nominated in the recently created District of Huron as the Reform candidate in an election to be held in 1836 for a seat in the 13th Parliament of Upper Canada in Toronto. He was defeated in that election by Robert Graham Dunlop from Goderich, Ontario, the brother of William "Tiger" Dunlop .

== Rebellion and confinement ==
Frustrated by what he saw as a failure to address important issues on the part of both the Canada Company and the so-called Family Compact he began a period of much more involvement with William Lyon Mackenzie and participation in more extreme forms of politics. It's possible that Mackenzie based his appointment of Van Egmond as military leader for a planned open rebellion to begin at Montgomery's Tavern near Toronto in December 1837, on Van Egmond's possibly exaggerated past claims of having gained actual combat experience in the Napoleonic Wars in Europe.

It is indicated in sources that on the day of the actual engagement at Montgomery's Tavern, Van Egmond advised William Lyon Mackenzie that their military cause was "hopeless" and advised him to retreat from the situation. Mackenzie is purported to have threatened Van Egmond's life if he failed to proceed with their plan. After being routed in the engagement by government armed forces, Van Egmond was arrested and confined to a small prison cell in Toronto. Suffering from a possible combination of malnutrition, pneumonia and exposure, Van Egmond became seriously ill in confinement and was transferred to a nearby hospital where he died on 5 January 1838. Subsequent to his death, Van Egmond's substantial real estate holdings, apart from the original family farm, were seized by the colonial government, purportedly as punishment for his participation in the uprising. Van Edgmond is buried at Egmondville Cemetery in Egmondville, Ontario.

The community of Egmondville, now incorporated within the community of Seaforth in the Municipality of Huron East was founded in Van Egmond's honour in 1845, by his eldest son Constant.

== Sources ==
- Lee, Robert C., (2004). The Canada Company and The Huron Tract, 1826–1853. Natural Heritage Books, Toronto On. ISBN 1-896219-94-2, pp. 80, 84, 129, 154–155, 257
- Coleman, Thelma, (1978). The Canada Company, County of Perth, Stratford On. ISBN 0-88988-029-8, pp. 63, 82–83, 100, 102–105, 170, 172–173
- Van Veen, W. J. (1988). "Van Egmond, Anthony Jacob William Gysbert". In Halpenny, Francess G. (ed.). Dictionary of Canadian Biography. Vol. VII (1836–1850) (online ed.). University of Toronto Press.
- Armstrong, Frederick H.; Stagg, Ronald J. (1976). "McKenzie, William Lyon". In Halpenny, Francess G. (ed.). Dictionary of Canadian Biography. Vol. IX (1861–1870) (online ed.). University of Toronto Press. commenting on Van Egmonds involvement in the Rebellion

== Further reference ==
- "Information regarding Egmondville". Archived from the original on 28 August 2008.
- Location of Original Van Egmond Family Farm, historically described as "Lot 4. Concession 1, Hullett Township
- Location of Egmondville, Ontario
