= Winthrop, Ontario =

Community in Ontario, Canada

- Dispersed rural community
- Interactive map of Winthrop, Ontario
- Coordinates: 43°37′2″N 81°20′31″W
- Country: Canada
- Province: Ontario
- County: Huron
- Municipality: Huron East
- Time zone: UTC−5 (Eastern Standard Time)
  - Summer (DST): UTC−4 (Eastern Daylight Time)

Winthrop is a dispersed rural community in Huron East, Huron County, Ontario, Canada.

== History ==
Winthrop was settled in 1834 by the Govenlock family. A post office opened in 1868, and by the 1870s, Winthrop contained a telegraph office, hotel, Presbyterian church, tavern, school, brickyard, two blacksmiths, a sawmill, a grist and flour mill, and a cheese and butter factory. Daily mail arrived by stage coach.

The post office closed in 1915.
