= St. Joseph, Huron County, Ontario =

St. Joseph
- Village
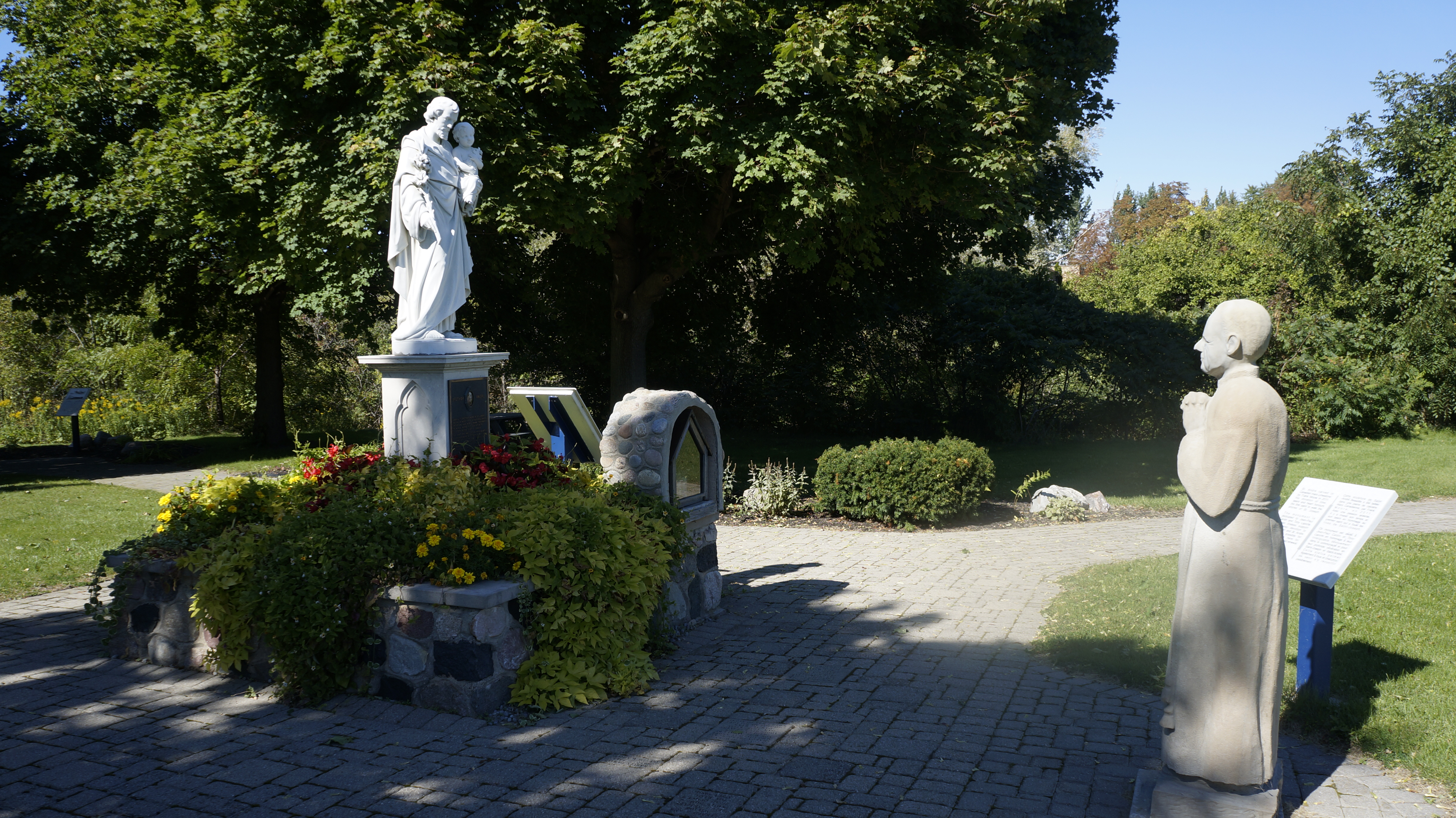
- St. Joseph Memorial Park
- Nickname: St. Jo's
- Location within Ontario
- Coordinates: 43°24′46″N 81°42′35″W
- Country: Canada
- Province: Ontario
- County: Huron County
- Settled: 1846
- Time zone: UTC-4 (Eastern)
- Postal code: N0M 2T0
- Area code: 519

St. Joseph (French St-Joseph or Saint-Joseph) is a community in Huron County, Ontario, Canada, in the municipality of Bluewater. It is on the shore of Lake Huron near Grand Bend. St. Joseph has houses, a few shops, and a gas station.

It was first settled, as "Pointe-aux-Bouleaux", by some French Canadian families seeking greater opportunity in 1846. Over the years the name was changed to "Johnson's Mills", "Lakeview" and finally "St. Joseph".

== Narcisse Cantin ==
Narcisse Cantin is thought of as the "founder" of St. Joseph, having returned to the settlement from Buffalo in 1896 and being instrumental in his visionary yet failed attempt to better the community he grew up in.

Cantin's plans for St. Joseph hinged on the development of a deep water canal cutting across southern Ontario and connecting into his plans for the greater St. Lawrence Seaway. However, the breakout of the First World War prevented work on the canal going forward.
