= Bayfield 29 =

1970s Canadian recreational keelboat

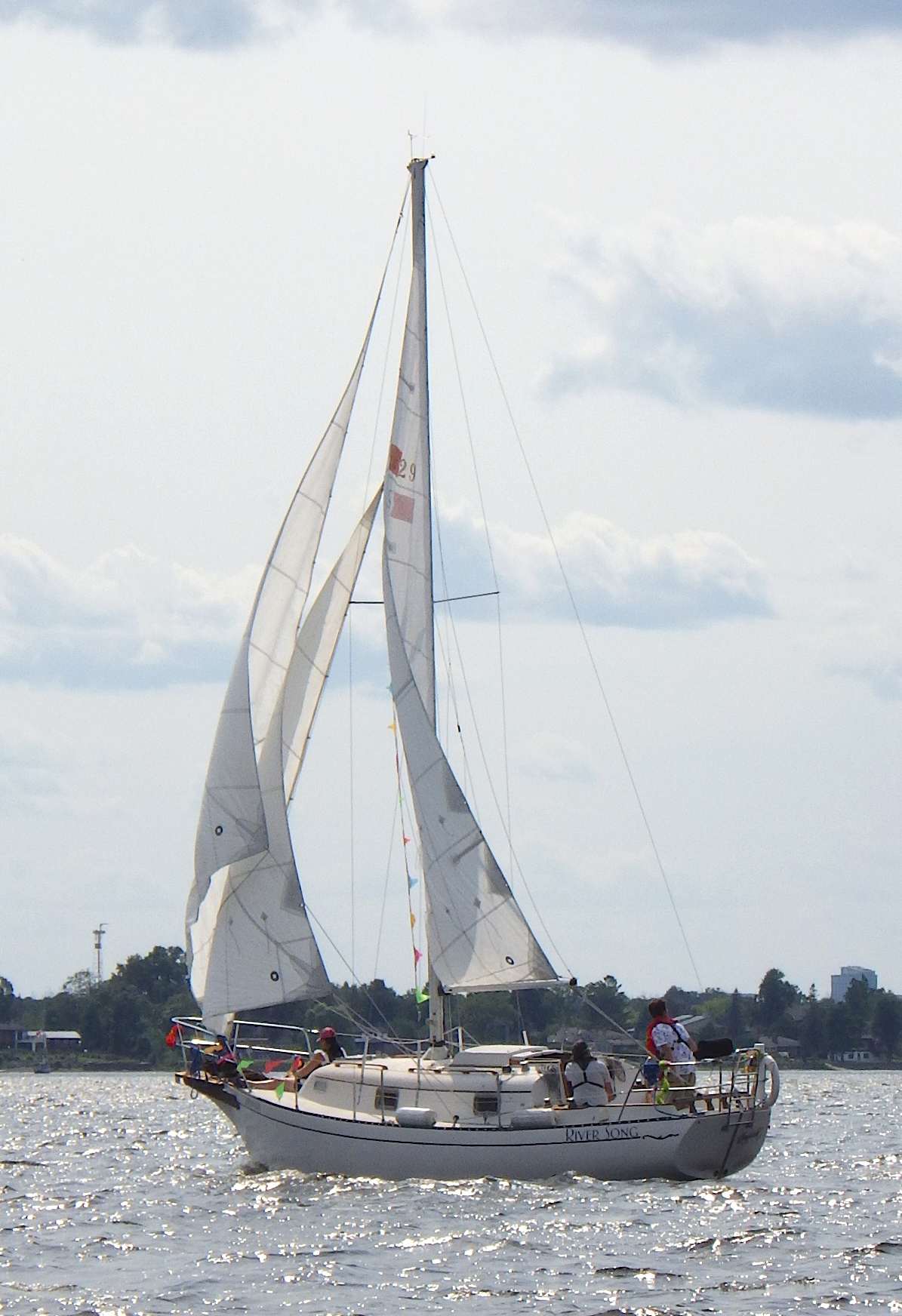

Development
- Designer: Ted Gozzard
- Location: Canada United States
- Year: 1978
- No. built: 350
- Builder: Bayfield Boat Yard
- Role: Cruiser

Boat
- Displacement: 7,100 lb (3,221 kg)
- Draft: 3.50 ft (1.07 m)

Hull
- Type: Monohull
- Construction: Fibreglass
- LOA: 29.00 ft (8.84 m)
- LWL: 21.75 ft (6.63 m)
- Beam: 10.17 ft (3.10 m)
- Engine: Yanmar 2GM 15 hp (11 kW) diesel engine

Hull appendages
- Keel: long keel
- Ballast: 3,000 lb (1,361 kg)
- Rudder: keel-mounted rudder

Rig
- Rig type: Cutter rig
- I foretriangle height: 36.00 ft (10.97 m)
- J foretriangle base: 14.00 ft (4.27 m)
- P mainsail luff: 30.50 ft (9.30 m)
- E mainsail foot: 11.00 ft (3.35 m)

Sails
- Sailplan: Cutter rigged sloop
- Mainsail area: 167.75 sq ft (15.584 m^{2})
- Jib/genoa area: 252.00 sq ft (23.412 m^{2})
- Total sail area: 419.75 sq ft (38.996 m^{2})

Racing
- PHRF: 213

The Bayfield 29 is a recreational keelboat built by the Bayfield Boat Yard in Canada from 1978 to 1983, with 350 boats completed.

The hull has a clipper bow, a conventional transom, a keel-mounted rudder controlled by a tiller, or optional Edson wheel, and a fixed long keel with a full bow. Company president Jake Rogerson noted in 1985 that the boats were over-built.

The moderately heavy cruiser has a cutter rig and no provision for a spinnaker. The sturdy mast is keel-stepped.

The small cockpit has a raised to seat to give a view over the high cabin top.

There are five berths. There is no V-berth; instead the bow is occupied by a large head. The compact galley is L-shaped. The cabin is an open plan design, with wood panels in the central bulkhead that can be raised to make the create two cabins. The interior was delivered with unfinished teak.
