= Eglinton, Ontario =

Defunct Canadian farming village

Coordinates: 43.707°N 79.398°W

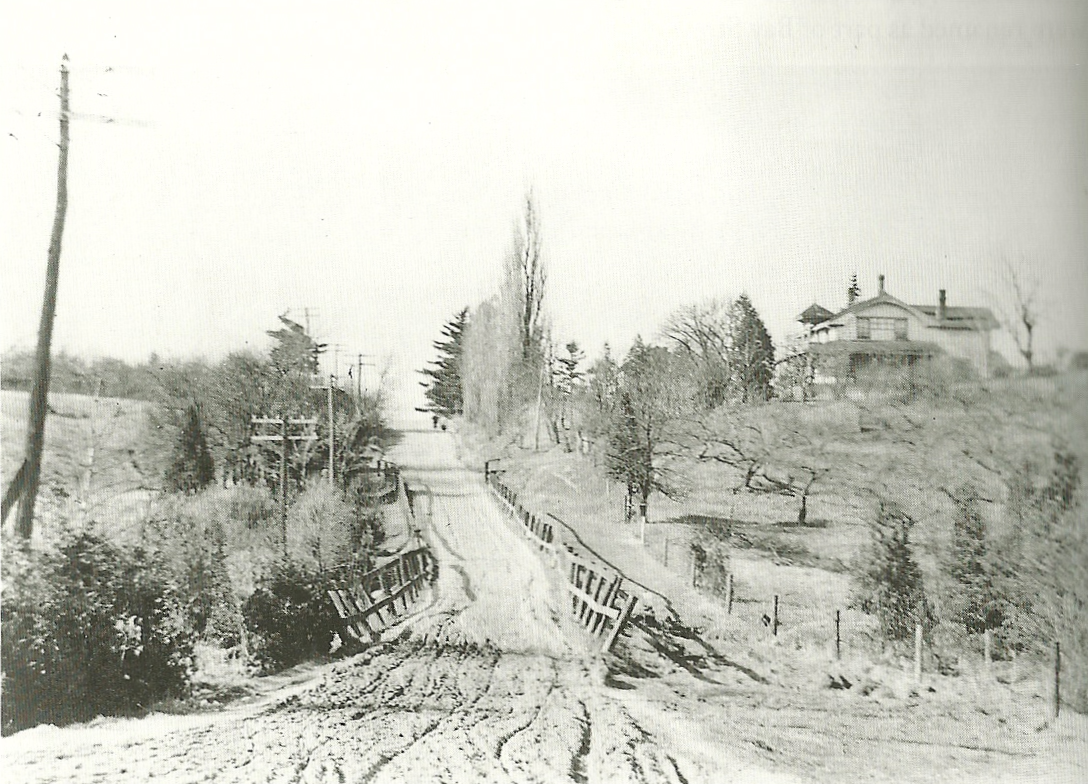
Intersection of Bayview Avenue and Eglinton Avenue, looking north. The creek was buried alongside the construction of Leaside High School.

Eglinton was a small farming village in York County, Ontario, Canada, located at what is today the intersection of Yonge Street and Eglinton Avenue. It was first settled in the early 19th century and became the agricultural hub for the area just north of the city of Toronto.

The village was an important stage stop on Yonge Street, the main road north from Toronto. One of the first settlers was John Montgomery, who founded a tavern catering to travelers. He likely named the village after the Earls of Eglinton, who had the family name Montgomerie and with whom he believed he had some connection. In 1837, Montgomery's Tavern served as the base of William Lyon Mackenzie's rebels and was the site of the Battle of Montgomery's Tavern.

A successful village of 700 people, the area's character changed in 1884 when the Metropolitan Street Railway began running a horse-drawn streetcar up Yonge Street to the village. Rapid housing development soon followed. As the population grew, the settlement was in 1890 incorporated with the smaller Davisville Village into the town of North Toronto. North Toronto was annexed to Toronto two decades later. The name of the village was given to the east–west concession road running through it, which would become today's Eglinton Avenue.

During the early 19th century, the area was part of the largest cattle-grazing region in Upper Canada (now the southern region of Ontario). The region was the first in North America to extend the use of cowbells to all cattle in a herd. Prior to this, it had been standard practice for a cowbell to be attached only to the best and leading animal in a group of livestock. To honour this practice, in 2009 the City of Toronto named a local street Cowbell Lane.
