= Cranbrook, Ontario =

Coordinates: 43°42′13″N 81°11′38″W

Cranbrook is a community and unincorporated area in the municipality of Huron East, Huron County, Ontario, Canada. It is located at the intersection of McNabb Line and Cranbrook Road in geographic Grey Township.

Cranbrook is a pre-Confederation settlement with at least one house, of limestone construction, that dates back to 1869, and is part of the former Huron Tract.

The main industry is farming.

The Middle Maitland River flows past the community on the way to Goderich on Lake Huron.
