= Jamestown, Ontario =

Coordinates: 43.810°N 81.197°W

Location of Jamestown in Ontario

Jamestown is a community in Ontario, Canada.

Jamestown is the name given to a small settlement, circa 1850, that sprang up along the boundary between Morris and Grey Townships, along the Maitland River in Southwestern Ontario, north of present-day Brussels. Apparently, James' Town derived its name from the number of men in the local community with the name of James - James Aitchison, James Lynn, James Strachan, James Simpson, James Forrest and James Moses. Because of all the James' living locally, James Aitchison, a reporter from Goderich, referred to the junction as James' Town. The name changed to Jamestown through the years.
