= Fanny Amelia Bayfield =

Canadian artist and educator (1813/4–1891)

Fanny Wright Bayfield
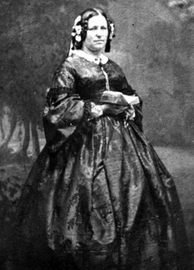
- Born: Fanny Amelia Wright; Kensington, London, United Kingdom
- Died: 11 September 1891; Charlottetown, Canada
- Known for: Painter, Educator
- Spouse: Henry Wolsey Bayfield (m. 1838)

Fanny Amelia Bayfield (née Wright; 1813/14 – September 11, 1891) was an English-born Canadian artist and educator.

== Career ==
The daughter of Charles Wright, a captain in the Royal Engineers, Bayfield was born in Kensington and reputedly studied art in England with an instructor who also taught Queen Victoria. She came to Lower Canada in 1833 when her father was posted to Quebec. In 1838, Bayfield married Captain Henry Wolsey Bayfield, a surveyor; the couple had four sons and two daughters. In 1841, she moved with her husband to Charlottetown. She taught painting and possibly music to women there.

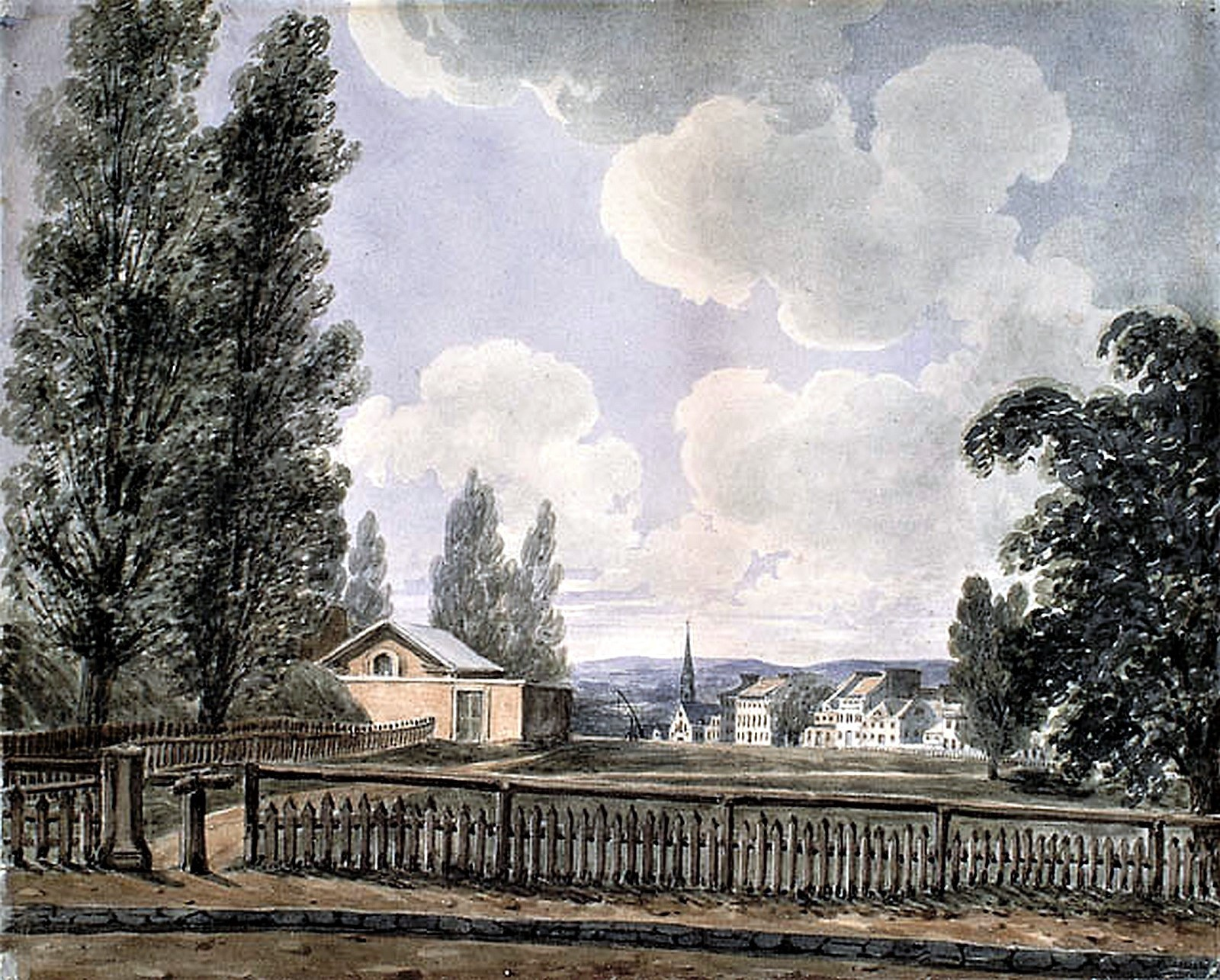
The Esplanade

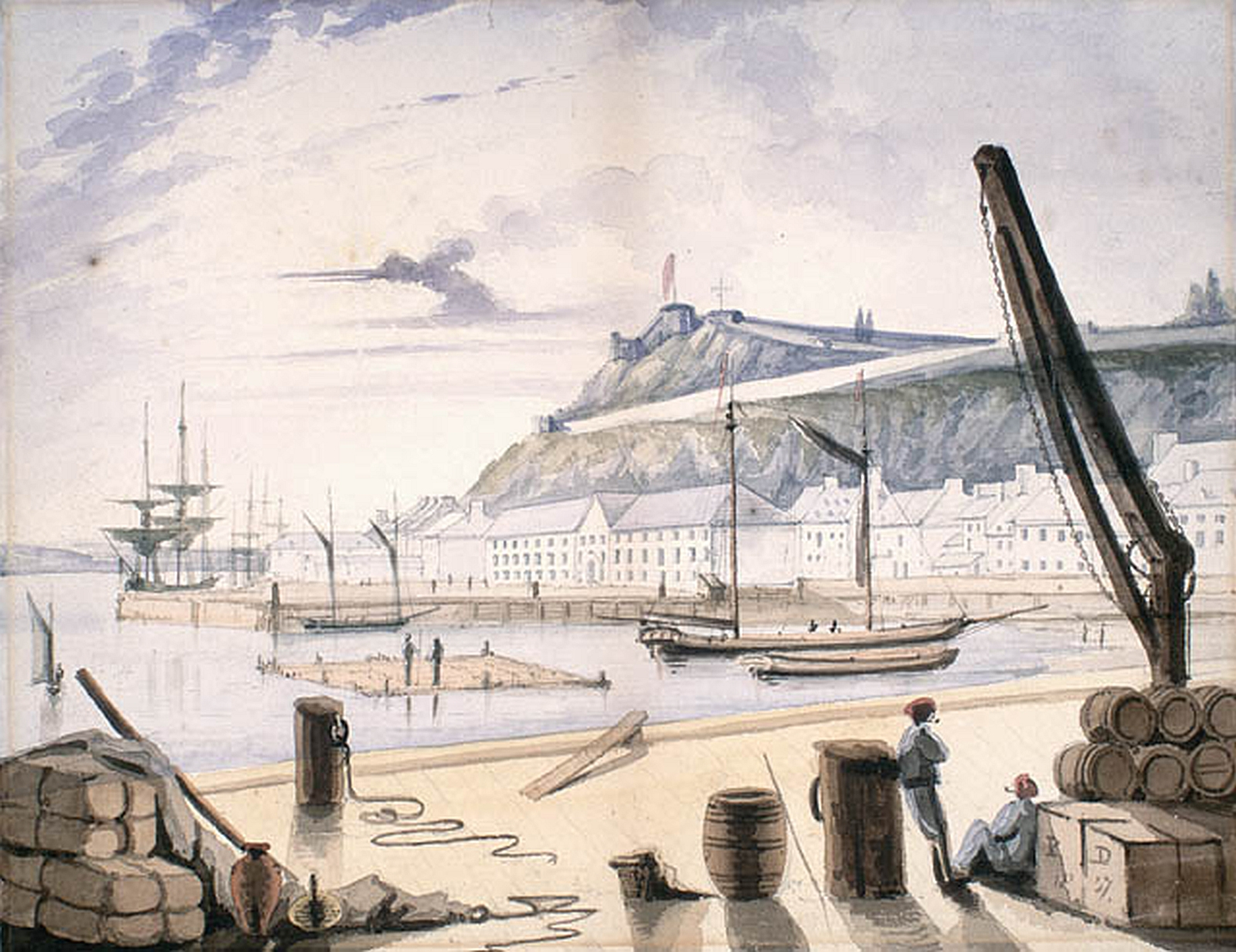
The King's Wharf

Works attributed to Bayfield (she did not sign her work) are held in the collections of the Glenbow Foundation in Calgary and the Confederation Centre Art Gallery in Charlottetown.

She died in Charlottetown at the age of 77. Her granddaughter presented an album of wildflowers in watercolour, Canadian wild flowers, to Library and Archives Canada.
