= Huron East, Ontario =

Municipality in Ontario, Canada

Huron East
- Municipality (lower-tier)
- Municipality of Huron East
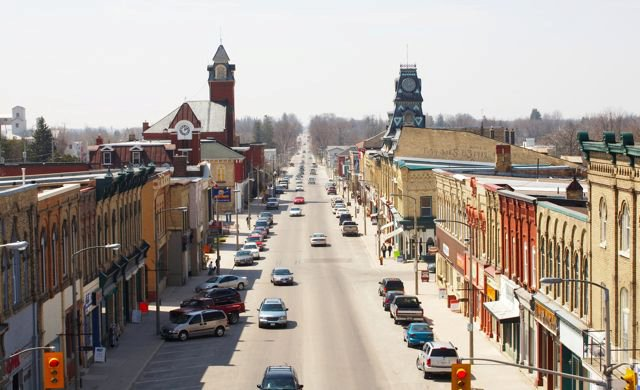
- Seaforth

- Location within Southern Ontario
- Coordinates: 43°37′30″N 81°17′04″W
- Country: Canada
- Province: Ontario
- County: Huron
- Settled: 1830s
- Formed: January 1, 2001

Government
  - Mayor: Bernie MacLellan
  - Fed. riding: Huron—Bruce
  - Prov. riding: Huron—Bruce

Area
  - Land: 669.15 km^{2} (258.36 sq mi)

Population (2021)
  - Total: 9,512
  - Density: 14.2/km^{2} (37/sq mi)
- Time zone: UTC-5 (EST)
  - Summer (DST): UTC-4 (EDT)
- Postal Code: N0K, N0G
- Area codes: 519, 226
- Website: www.huroneast.com

Huron East is a municipality in Huron County, Ontario, Canada. It was formed on January 1, 2001, as an amalgamation of the former Grey, McKillop and Tuckersmith townships with the town of Seaforth and village of Brussels, due to an Ontario-wide local government restructuring imposed by the government of that time. The municipality is structured as five wards based on the former townships, town and village.

In January 2022, then eighteen-year-old Justin Morrison became the youngest person in the history of Huron East to become a municipal councillor.

== Geography ==
=== Communities ===
Besides the town of Seaforth and the village of Brussels, the municipality of Huron East comprises a number of villages and hamlets.

Former Grey Township:

- Brussels (Note: Shared with the Municipality of Morris-Turnberry)
- Cranbrook
- Ethel
- Molesworth (Note: Shared with the Municipality of North Perth, within Perth County)
- Walton
- Henfryn
- Ethel Siding
- Jamestown
- McNaught
- Moncrieff
- Silver Corners

Former McKillop Township:

- St. Columban (Note: Shared with the Municipality of West Perth, within Perth County)
- Seaforth
- Winthrop
- Leadbury
- Dublin
- Beachwood
- Manley
- Roxboro
- Slabtown

Former Tuckersmith Township:

- Brucefield (Note: Shared with the Municipality of Bluewater)
- Egmondville
- Harpurhey
- Hensall (Note: Partially shared with the Municipality of Bluewater; former village)
- Kippen
- Vanastra (Note: Shared with the Municipality of Central Huron)
- Clinton
- Chiselhurst

== Demographics ==
Historical census populations – Huron East
Year	Pop.	±%
1996	9,937	—
2001	9,680	−2.6%
2006	9,310	−3.8%
2011	9,264	−0.5%
2016	9,138	−1.4%
2021	9,512	+4.1%
Source: Statistics Canada

In the 2021 Census of Population conducted by Statistics Canada, Huron East had a population of 9,512 living in 3,707 of its 3,912 total private dwellings, a change of 4.1% from its 2016 population of 9,138. With a land area of 669.15 km^{2} (258.36 sq mi), it had a population density of 14.2/km^{2} (36.8/sq mi) in 2021.

== See also ==
- List of townships in Ontario
