= Bluewater, Ontario =

Bluewater
- Municipality (lower-tier)
- Municipality of Bluewater
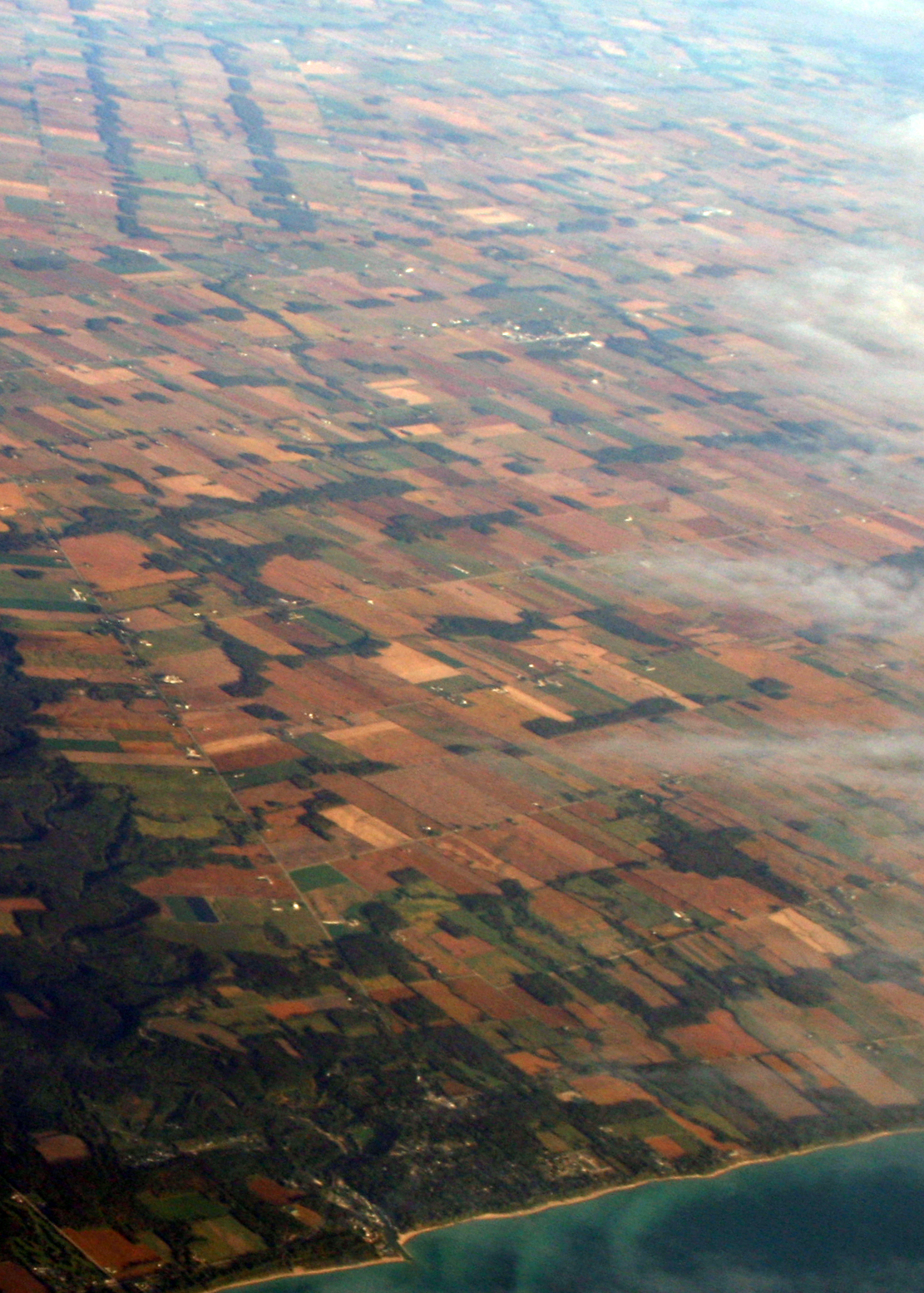

- Location within Southern Ontario
- Coordinates: 43°27′N 81°36′W
- Country: Canada
- Province: Ontario
- County: Huron
- Formed: January 1, 2001

Government
  - Mayor: Paul Klopp
  - Deputy Mayor: John Becker
  - Fed. riding: Huron—Bruce
  - Prov. riding: Huron—Bruce

Area
  - Land: 416.70 km^{2} (160.89 sq mi)

Population (2021)
  - Total: 7,540
  - Density: 18.1/km^{2} (47/sq mi)
- Time zone: UTC-5 (EST)
  - Summer (DST): UTC-4 (EDT)
- Postal Code: N0M
- Area codes: 519, 226
- Website: www.municipalityofbluewater.ca

Bluewater is a municipality located in Huron County, Ontario, which is part of Southwestern Ontario, Ontario, Canada. As of 2021, the municipality has a population of over 7,500.

== History ==
Bluewater was formed on January 1, 2001, when the Government of Ontario amalgamated the townships of Hay and Stanley with the villages of Bayfield, Hensall and Zurich.

== Geography ==
Bluewater's western boundary is Lake Huron. Its northern boundary is the Bayfield River between Lake Huron and Clinton. Highway 4 is the eastern boundary, while Huron Road 83 and the Exeter urban boundary (in South Huron) form the southern boundary.

=== Communities ===
Bluewater includes the following communities:

- Hay Township: Blake (shared with Stanley Township), Dashwood (shared with South Huron), Hensall, Kippen (shared with Huron East)(and formerly shared between Hay, Stanley and Tuckersmith Townships), St. Joseph, Zurich, Hay, Hills Green, Johnson's Mills, Rodgerville, Sarepta
- Stanley Township: Bayfield, Brucefield (shared with Huron East), Kippen (shared with Huron East)(and formerly shared between Hay, Stanley and Tuckersmith Townships), Varna; Bannockburn, Dinsley Terrace, Drysdale, Goshen

== Demographics ==
In the 2021 Census of Population conducted by Statistics Canada, Bluewater had a population of 7,540 living in 3,302 of its 4,882 total private dwellings, a change of 5.7% from its 2016 population of 7,136. With a land area of 416.7 km^{2} (160.9 sq mi), it had a population density of 18.1/km^{2} (46.9/sq mi) in 2021.

Historical census populations – Bluewater, Ontario
Year	Pop.	±%
1996	6,874	—
2001	6,919	+0.7%
2006	7,120	+2.9%
2011	7,044	−1.1%
2016	7,136	+1.3%
2021	7,540	+5.7%
Source: Statistics Canada

== Notable persons ==
- William Aberhart – Premier of Alberta
- Ryan O'Reilly – Professional hockey player and Stanley Cup champion
- Babe Siebert – Professional hockey player

== See also ==
- List of townships in Ontario
