= Robert Bayfield =

English physician and author of the 17th century

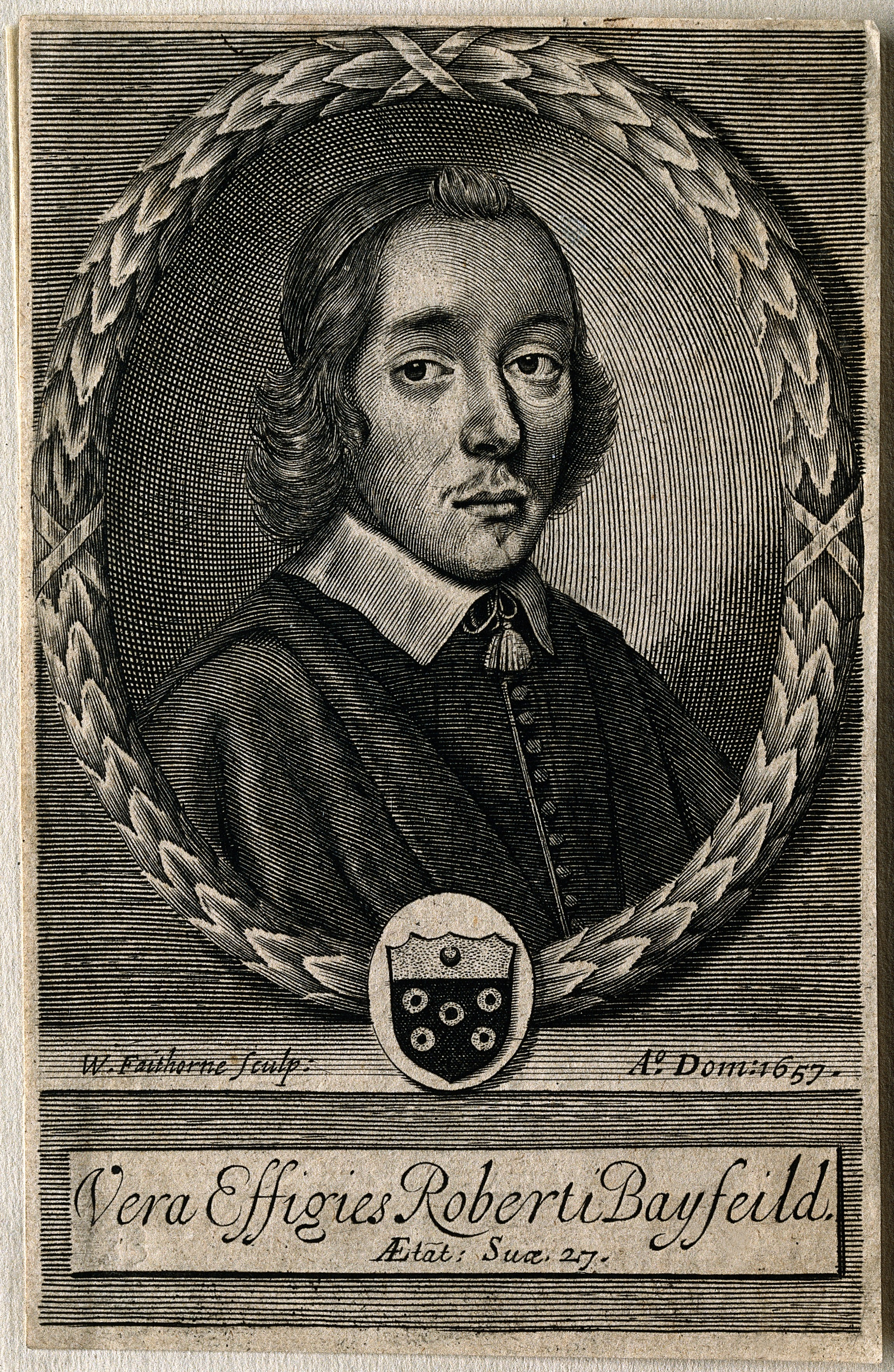
1657 portrait. Credit: Wellcome Collection

Robert Bayfield (baptised 1629) of Norwich was an English physician and author on religious and medical subjects.

Bayfield was the author of:

- Enchiridion Medicum, containing the causes, signs, and cures of all those diseases that do chiefly affect the body of man. ... Whereunto is added a treatise, "De Facultatibus Medicamentorum compositorum et Dosibus", 1655. E
- Exercitationes Anatomicæ, 2nd edit. 1668.
- Tῆς Ἰατρικῆς Kαρπός, or a Treatise de morborum capitis essentiis et prognosticis, adorned with above three hundred choice and rare observations, 1663.
- Ἡ Προβολὴ τῆς Ἀληθείας: or the Bulwarke of Truth, being a treatise ... against Atheists and Hereticks,London, 1657 bearing Edmund Calamy's imprimatur (republished at Newcastle in 1804).
- Tractatus de Tumoribus præter naturam; or a treatise of preternatural Tumors; the second part of this book is dedicated to Sir Thomas Browne, 1662.

A portrait of Bayfield, aged 25, by William Faithorne, dated 1654, is prefixed to the Enchiridion. Another portrait of Bayfield, aged 27, by the same artist, appears in the Bulwark of Truth, 1657, and again in the Tractatus, 1662.
