= Narcisse Cantin =

Narcisse Cantin (July 7, 1870 – January 16, 1940) created the French Canadian settlement of Johnson's Mills, now known as St. Joseph. He was known as "The Father of the St. Lawrence Seaway".

St. Joseph was one of the first "planned" communities in Canada, which Narcisse Cantin intended to be a hub of manufacturing, railroad connections (to Stratford, Grand Bend, and Parkhill), shipping, and the mouth of a canal cutting across southern Ontario (over a very short distance, with only one lock) and connecting into the St. Lawrence Seaway. Cantin's plans for the canal system was approved by parliament, however the outbreak of the great war prevented any work from going ahead.

Cantin failed to obtain the rights to develop the St. Lawrence River's hydro-electric power potential.

He died poor. In the end, the Cantin family had to fund-raise to pay for his funeral expenses.

== Narcisse, the play ==
A dramatization of Narcisse Cantin's life has been written by Paul Ciufo, directed by Duncan McGregor and financed by the St. Joseph's Historical Society. The action is narrated by the character of Narcisse's son Napoléon Cantin ("Nap" for short), and tells the story of Narcisse's life and the beginnings of St. Josephs, after the French Settlement there.
