= Henry Wolsey Bayfield =

Royal Navy Admiral and surveyor (1795–1885)

Admiral Henry Wolsey Bayfield
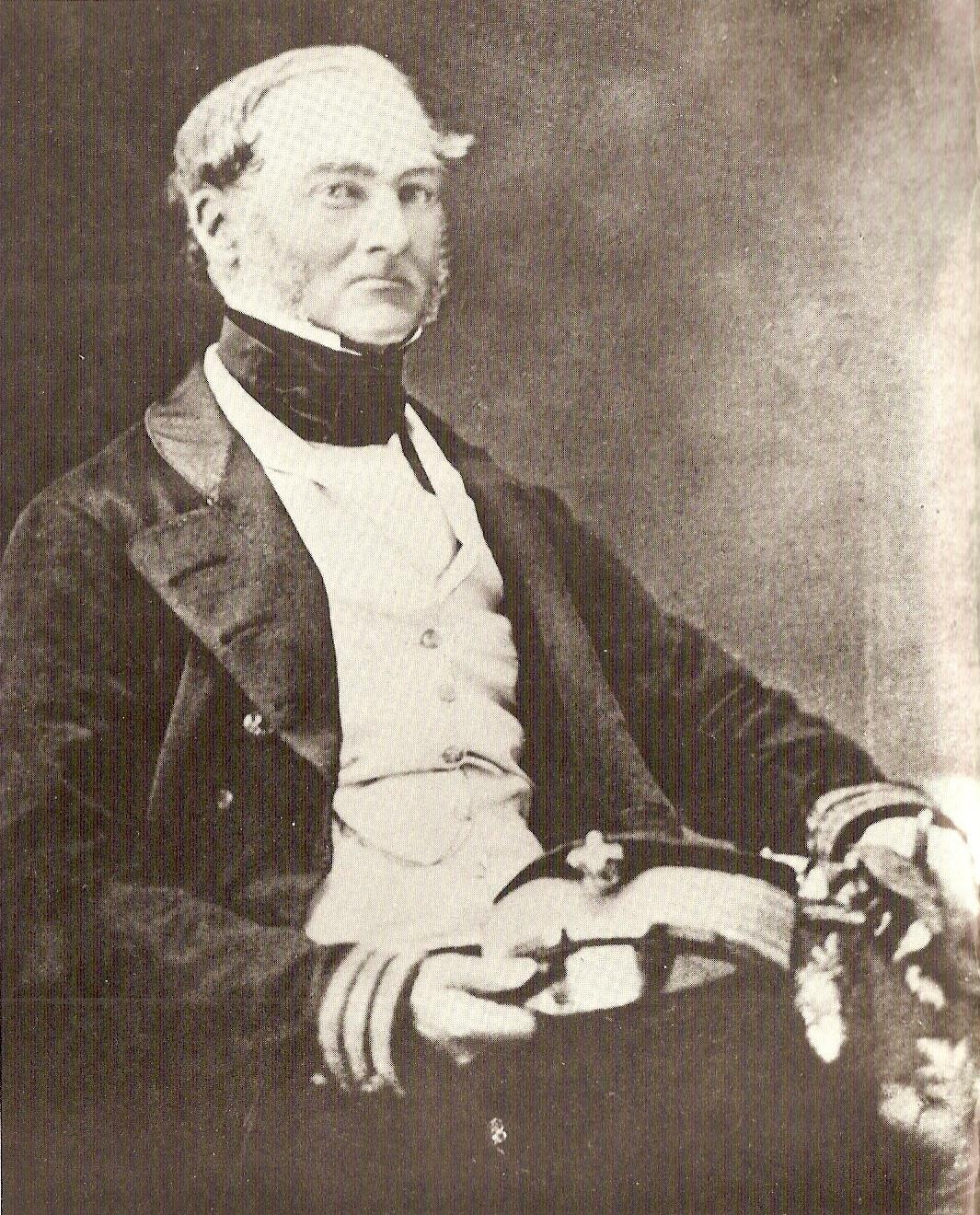
- Born: 21 January 1795; Kingston-upon-Hull, England
- Died: 10 February 1885 (aged 90) Charlottetown, Prince Edward Island
- Allegiance: United Kingdom of Great Britain and Ireland
- Branch: Royal Navy
- Rank: Admiral on retired list, Vice Admiral

Admiral Henry Wolsey Bayfield (21 January 1795 – 10 February 1885) was a British naval officer and surveyor.

== Early life and career ==
Bayfield was born in Kingston-upon-Hull, to John Wolsey Bayfield and Eliza Petit. His family was an ancient one, who at one time lived at Bayfield Hall in Norfolk. Henry was inspired by the naval victories of Admiral Lord Nelson, who died at the scene of his greatest victory, the Battle of Trafalgar, the year before Henry joined the Navy. While his education is unknown, he joined the Royal Navy on 6 January 1806 at the age of 10, as a volunteer on HMS Pompee. That same year, he was on the ship when it defeated a French privateer.

At Cádiz, Bayfield was transferred to HMS Queen, and shortly after to HMS Duchess of Bedford. In this particular ship, he was wounded in a battle with two Spanish ships near Gibraltar; for his good work in this episode, he was transferred as a first class volunteer to HMS Beagle, on 29 September 1806, on which over the next four years he was involved in a number of battles. He was rated midshipman in 1810, and saw Canada for the first time in the same year, at the age of 15.

In April 1811, Bayfield transferred to HMS Wanderer, and worked in many different places, including the coast of North America, the West Indies and Spain. He was commissioned as a lieutenant on 20 March 1815, and in the summer of 1816 assisted Captain William Fitzwilliam Owen in surveying various Canadian rivers and lakes. There are works in the art collection of the Royal Military College of Canada by Admiral Henry Wolsey Bayfield (1795-1885).

== Admiralty surveyor ==
In June 1817, Bayfield was made the admiralty surveyor for North America. He surveyed Lake Superior, Lake Erie and Lake Huron, among many others. After several years surveying the lakes in North America, he returned to England in the autumn of 1825, and completed several charts of the lakes. He was promoted commander in 1826, and the following year, he travelled to Quebec to complete surveys of the St Lawrence River.

== Later career ==
Bayfield was promoted to captain on 4 June 1834, and on 2 April 1838, he married Fanny, who was the only daughter of General Charles Wright; they had six children together. In 1841 his headquarters were moved to Charlottetown, Prince Edward Island, so that the survey could be continued. On 21 October 1856, he was promoted Rear-Admiral of the Blue, and subsequently Rear-Admiral of the White on 8 December 1857, Rear Admiral of the Red on 9 August 1861, and Vice-Admiral of the Blue on 27 April 1863, and Vice Admiral of the Red on 11 January 1864. He retired on 31 March 1866, and was promoted admiral on the retired list on 18 October 1867. Over a period of over 20 years, he wrote a book entitled Sailing directions for the Gulf and River of St. Lawrence, that was published in instalments. It was later republished in 1860 as The St. Lawrence pilot. Several ships which served in the Canadian Hydrographic Service or its predecessors have been named in his honour. He died in Charlottetown on 10 February 1885, at the age of 90.

== Legacy ==
Henry Wolsey Bayfield's journal, kept between 1829 and 1853 and covering his surveying efforts of the St Lawrence, was edited by Ruth Mackenzie and republished in two volumes between 1984 and 1986 by the Champlain Society. Although Bayfield's surveys of Lakes Erie and Huron were detailed and accurate, he regretted also that his measurements were not more exact: "There are few things I should wish more than to improve the accuracy of the Lake Surveys [Erie and Huron] ... in consequence of my [having] only open boats & no good chronometer. "He is the namesake of Bayfield, Ontario, Bayfield, Wisconsin, Bayfield, New Brunswick and Bayfield, Nova Scotia. Bayfield Street, a major road in Barrie, Ontario, is also named after him.

Others rose in rank and experience under his mentorship, including Captain John Orlebar, R.N. who went on to create a hydrographic survey of the Newfoundland coast for the Admiralty and advised in the site selection for new light houses, fog horns and other safety measures to improve the safety of the rocky coast.

Bayfield plays an important role in Katherine Govier's novel Creation (2002).

== See also ==
- O'Byrne, William Richard (1849). "Bayfield, Henry Wolsey" . A Naval Biographical Dictionary . John Murray – via Wikisource.
- Pierre-Olivier Combelles, "John James Audubon, l'amiral Henry Wolsey Bayfield et leur rencontre sur la Basse-Côte-Nord du Québec durant l'été 1833." La revue d'histoire de la Côte-Nord no 34, juin 2002, pp. 16–24. Société du Golfe de Sept-Iles (Québec-Ca).
