= Seaforth, Ontario =

Seaforth
- Unincorporated community
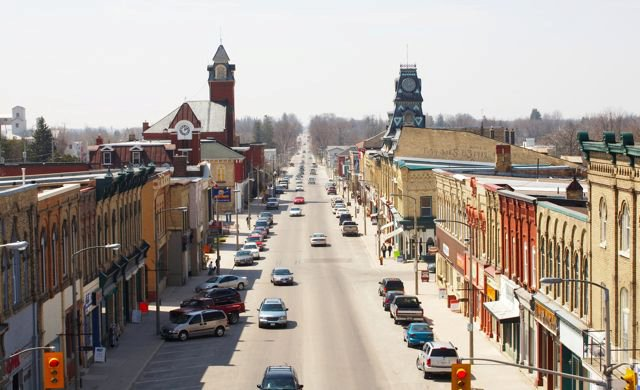
- Main street south

- Location of Seaforth in Ontario Seaforth (Southern Ontario)
- Coordinates: 43°33′17″N 81°23′49″W
- Country: Canada
- Province: Ontario
- County: Huron
- Municipality: Huron East

Government
  - Town mayor: Bernie MacLellan
  - MPP: Lisa Thompson
  - MP: Ben Lobb

Population (2021)
  - Total: 2,673
- Time zone: UTC-5 (Eastern (EST))
  - Summer (DST): UTC-4 (EDT)
- Postal code: N0K 1W0
- Area code: 519
- Website: huroneast.com

Seaforth is an unincorporated community located in Southern Ontario within the municipality of Huron East, in Huron County, Ontario, Canada. As of the 2021 Canadian Census the town’s population is 2,673.

== History ==
Originally known as Four Corners and Steene's Corners after an early settler, much of the area of what is now Seaforth was acquired by brothers Christopher and George Sparling in anticipation of the construction of the Buffalo, Brantford and Goderich Railway. Developer James Patton of Barrie purchased the land and laid out a townsite in 1855. The name 'Seaforth' may be derived from the Scottish Seaforth Highlanders regiment or Loch Seaforth in the Outer Hebrides of Scotland.

A post office was established in Seaforth in 1859. Incorporation as a Village followed in 1868 and as a Town in 1874. In 2001, Seaforth was amalgamated with Brussels, Grey Township, McKillop Township and Tuckersmith Township to form the Municipality of Huron East.

In September 1876, at two o'clock in the morning, a fire broke out in Mrs. Griffith's Candy and Grocery Store, raging through Main Street and destroying 12 acres (49,000 m^{2}) of the business section. The town rebounded and Main Street was rebuilt with the brick and block structures which stand today.

Seaforth's Main Street was designated in 1984 as a Heritage Conservation District because of its distinguished late 19th-century architecture. This architectural composition of two-storey brick buildings is unique in its uniformity of scale and character. Through grants and local support, property owners have been encouraged to restore and preserve the architectural characteristics of their buildings.

== Local attractions ==
=== The Van Egmond Reserve ===
Built by the eldest son of Colonel Anthony Van Egmond in 1846, it represents an example of Georgian architecture and Classical Revival styles. The house was restored with assistance from the Ontario Heritage Trust. The bricks were handmade on the property. Their variance in colour in the exterior walls is an indication that the home was built over an extended period of time, their difference in colour being a result of the varying conditions under which successive loads of bricks were fired during the course of construction. The house and grounds were saved in the early 1970s from demolition and a housing development by a group of community volunteers. Funds were raised to purchase the property and restore it to how it might have been prior to 1867. It was recognized as an Ontario Heritage property and signs indicative of that direct travelers to the Reserve. The Province of Ontario supported the restoration of the property and will become its owners should the local Van Egmond Foundation discontinue its work to ensure the property is safe and open to the public, in the summer and for special events. The Foundation continues to raise funds and to ensure the property is recognized as a local resource attempting to preserve the history of the early settlement and development of the region.

== Local media ==
- The Huron Expositor

== Notable people ==
- Jim Balsillie (born 1961), millionaire philanthropist and former co-CEO of BlackBerry manufacturer Research In Motion
- John Melady, Canadian non-fiction author
- Richard Nesbitt (born 1955), CEO of the Toronto Stock Exchange

=== Historical figures ===
- H. Isabel Graham (1869–1941), poet
- Howard Hillen Kerr (1900–1984), first principal of what was then Ryerson Polytechnical Institute.
- Charlie Mason (1912–1971), former NHL player with the New York Rangers, Detroit Red Wings and Chicago Blackhawks.
- Ron Mason (1940–2016), former hockey coach with Lake Superior State University, Bowling Green University and Michigan State University. Also former MSU Athletic Director. Inducted into the United States Hockey Hall of Fame in 2013.
- Colonel Anthony Van Egmond (1778–1838), first farmer in the Huron Tract. Participant in Upper Canada Rebellion.
- Cooney Weiland (1904–1985), former NHL player with the Boston Bruins, Ottawa Senators and Detroit Red Wings. Also former head coach with the NHL Boston Bruins. Inducted into the Hockey Hall of Fame in 1971.

=== Contemporary sports figures ===
- Boyd Devereaux, former NHL player with the Edmonton Oilers, Detroit Red Wings, Phoenix Coyotes and Toronto Maple Leafs. Member of the Detroit Red Wings 2002 Stanley Cup Championship team.
- Scott Driscoll, former NHL linesman.
- Arden Eddie, former Iron Man participant, team owner and manager in the Intercounty Baseball League.
- Lloyd Eisler, former Canadian pair skater. Along with skating partner Isabelle Brasseur, the pair were the 1992 and 1994 Olympic bronze medalist and the 1993 World Champion. Inducted into Canada's Sports Hall of Fame in 1996.
- Dave McLlwain, former NHL player with the Pittsburgh Penguins, Winnipeg Jets, New York Islanders, Buffalo Sabres, Toronto Maple Leafs and Ottawa Senators.
- Pat Murray - former NHL player with the Philadelphia Flyers. Brother to Rem.
- Rem Murray, former NHL player with the Edmonton Oilers, New York Rangers and Nashville Predators. Brother to Pat.
- Derek Nesbitt, former professional hockey player. Head coach with the Atlanta Gladiators of the ECHL.
- Cal O'Reilly, NHL player with the Nashville Predators, Phoenix Coyotes, Pittsburgh Penguins, Buffalo Sabres and Minnesota Wild. Brother to Ryan.
- Ryan O'Reilly, NHL player with the Colorado Avalanche, Buffalo Sabres, St. Louis Blues, Toronto Maple Leafs, and Nashville Predators. Member of the St. Louis Blues 2019 Stanley Cup Championship team. Conn Smythe Trophy winner as the Most Valuable Player of the 2019 Stanley Cup Playoffs. Brother to Cal.
- Evelyn Walsh, former No. 1-ranked Canadian junior pairs figure skater; No. 5 worldwide.
- Mike Watt, former NHL player with the Edmonton Oilers, New York Islanders, Nashville Predators and Carolina Hurricanes.

=== Politicians ===
- Clare Westcott (1924–2025), judge and chair of the Metro Toronto Police Commission
