= Trailboard =

Decorative feature on sailing ships

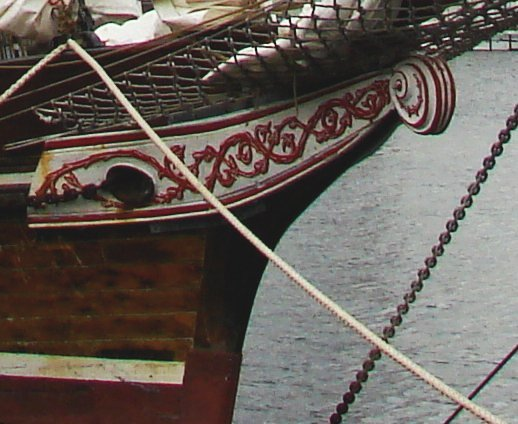
The bow of the German schooner SS Amphitrite, showing trailboards running from the billethead to the hawsepipe

The trailboards are a pair of boards that may be found at the bow of certain sailing vessels, where they run from the figurehead or billethead back to or towards the hawsepipe. They are in the main decorative, though they often bear the name of the ship; they vary in decoration styles.
