= Egmondville, Ontario =

Egmondville
- Unincorporated rural community
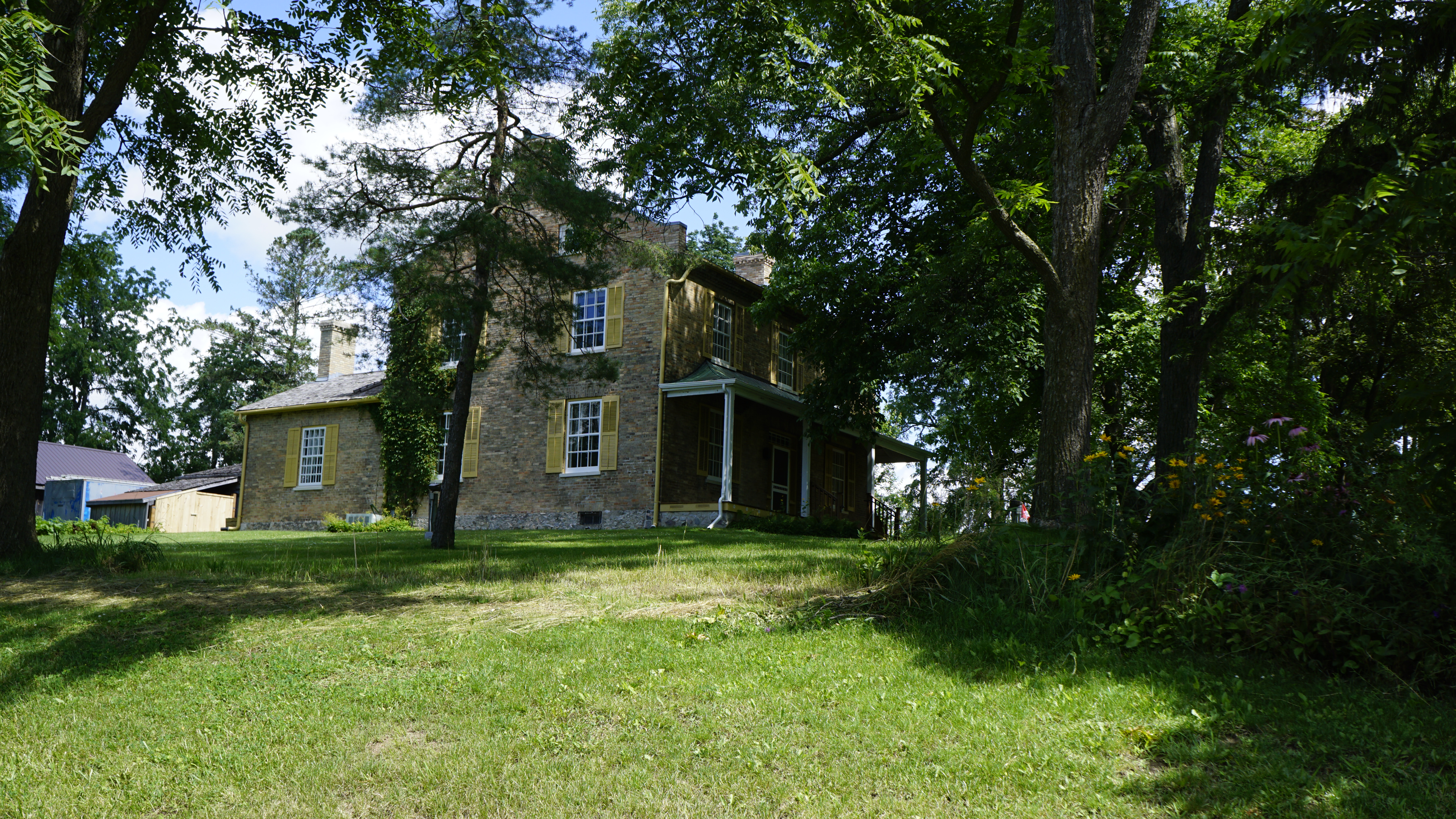
- The Van Egmond Residence

- Location in Ontario Egmondville (Canada)
- Coordinates: 43°32′41″N 81°24′11″W
- Country: Canada
- Province: Ontario
- County: Huron
- Municipality: Huron East
- Time zone: UTC-5 (Eastern (EST))
  - Summer (DST): UTC-4 (EDT)
- GNBC Code: FEHQG

Egmondville is an unincorporated rural community in Huron East, Huron County, Ontario, Canada.

== History ==
The community was founded in 1845 by Constant Van Egmond, the eldest son of Anthony Van Egmond and named in honour of his father. Van Egmond and son Constant were contracted in the 1830s to widen Huron Road and became the largest landowners in the area. Constant Van Egmond became a local magistrate.

== See also ==
- List of communities in Ontario

== Sources ==
- Lee, Robert C., (2004). The Canada Company and The Huron Tract, 1826–1853. Natural Heritage Books, Toronto On. ISBN 1-896219-94-2, pp. 80, 84, 129, 154–155, 257
- Bart-Riedstra, Carolynn, (2002). Stratford. Arcadia Publishing, ISBN 0-7385-1148-X, p. 18
- Coleman, Thelma, (1978). The Canada Company, County of Perth, Stratford On. ISBN 0-88988-029-8, pp. 172–173
