= Bayfield, Ontario =

Bayfield
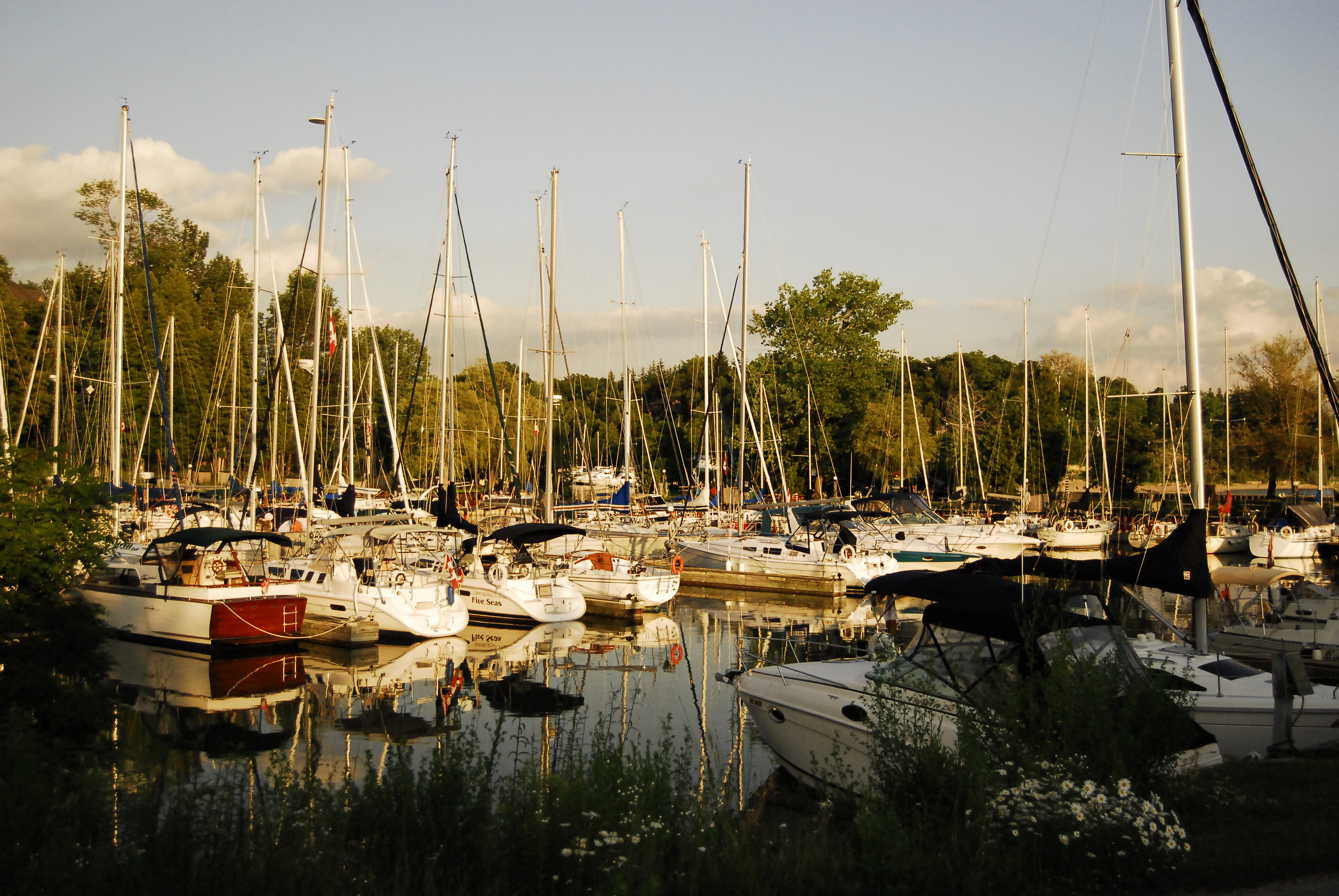
- Marina in Bayfield

- Location in southern Ontario
- Coordinates: 43°33′36″N 81°41′57″W
- Country: Canada
- Province: Ontario
- County: Huron County
- Municipality: Bluewater
- Founded: 1832
- Founder: Carel Lodewijk
- Time zone: UTC-5 (Eastern Time Zone)
  - Summer (DST): UTC-4 (Eastern Time Zone)
- Area codes: 519, 226, 548

Bayfield is a community in the municipality of Bluewater, Huron County in southwestern Ontario, Canada with a 2016 population of 1,112. Bluewater Municipality includes Bayfield, Bruce field, Dashwood, Hensall, Varna, and Zurich This municipality is made up of 92.8% English speaking people, 6.3% of other language speaking people and 0.9% of French speaking people as of 2016. In addition to this the majority of Bayfield's population is made up of Canadians, creating 88.2% of the population in the year 2016. It is on the eastern shore of Lake Huron at the mouth of Bayfield River. Bayfield is a popular tourist destination. Visitors enjoy the historic Main Street with its many well-preserved old buildings, including the Little Inn which has served travelers since the 1800s, initially as a stagecoach stop. Main Street is lined with boutique shops, art galleries and fine dining restaurants. The nearby marina and public beaches draw crowds in the summer months.

== History ==
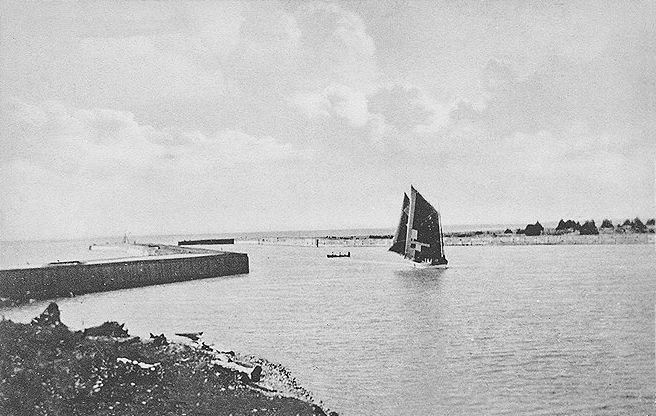
Bayfield Harbour, 1910

Bayfield was founded in 1832 by Carel Lodewijk, Baron van Tuyll van Serooskerken (1784-1835), a Dutch nobleman who had purchased 388 acres (157 ha) in the area, part of a much larger holding in the Huron Tract that he purchased from the Canada Company. Over the next 10 years, a plan was laid out for the community and two mills (grist and lumber) were built. It was named for noted Great Lakes surveyor and British naval officer Admiral Henry Wolsey Bayfield, who had personally selected the site for the community.

The mouth of the Bayfield River is a natural sheltered harbour and by 1869, the settlement was a port of entry and vessels touched here on their route from Detroit to Goderich. Stages travelled daily to Seaforth. In 1869, when the population was only 125, the settlement had a wagon and plough making shop, two blacksmiths, a distiller, a brickyard and two tanneries. A large, permanent harbour was built during the 1870s. By 1876, Bayfield was incorporated as a village, with a population of 846. In 1982, Bayfield was declared a heritage conservation district.

The Town Hall was built in 1882 and was not moved to its present location on Clan Gregor Square until 1920. By then, Bayfield had been in decline for at least 20 years, because the railway was built far from this area. By 1984, it was closed as a fire hazard; fund raising allowed for repairs, and the hall was re-opened in 1993. On January 1, 2001, Bayfield merged with Hensall, Zurich, Stanley and Hay to create Bluewater Municipality and the Bayfield Town Hall was used for community events. Additional upgrades to the building were made in 2013 and 2016.

== Geography ==
=== Climate ===
As Bayfield is located on the eastern shore of Lake Huron this has impacted the climate of the region, having an influence of rain and snow in the community close to the shores.

Climate data for Bayfield, Ontario
| Month | Jan | Feb | Mar | Apr | May | Jun | Jul | Aug | Sep | Oct | Nov | Dec | Year |
|---|---|---|---|---|---|---|---|---|---|---|---|---|---|
| Record high °C (°F) | 11.9 (53.4) | 18.5 (65.3) | 23.6 (74.5) | 23.9 (75.0) | 29.8 (85.6) | 32.0 (89.6) | 32.0 (89.6) | 34.4 (93.9) | 30.4 (86.7) | 25.5 (77.9) | 19.9 (67.8) | 16.7 (62.1) | 34.4 (93.9) |
| Mean daily maximum °C (°F) | −0.7 (30.7) | 2.5 (36.5) | 5.2 (41.4) | 11.0 (51.8) | 18.0 (64.4) | 22.7 (72.9) | 24.1 (75.4) | 23.6 (74.5) | 21.0 (69.8) | 14.2 (57.6) | 7.5 (45.5) | 1.4 (34.5) | 12.5 (54.6) |
| Mean daily minimum °C (°F) | −7.3 (18.9) | −4.7 (23.5) | −2.6 (27.3) | 1.4 (34.5) | 7.4 (45.3) | 12.6 (54.7) | 14.3 (57.7) | 13.4 (56.1) | 10.7 (51.3) | 5.2 (41.4) | 1.2 (34.2) | −4.6 (23.7) | 3.9 (39.1) |
| Record low °C (°F) | −24.2 (−11.6) | −17.6 (0.3) | −21.8 (−7.2) | −6.4 (20.5) | −1.0 (30.2) | 3.8 (38.8) | 6.9 (44.4) | 5.2 (41.4) | 0.7 (33.3) | −2.7 (27.1) | −14.6 (5.7) | −16.5 (2.3) | −24.2 (−11.6) |
Source: Environment Canada, The Weather Network

== Demographics ==
In the 2021 Census of Population conducted by Statistics Canada, Bayfield had a population of 1,250 living in 628 of its 906 total private dwellings, a change of 2.6% from its 2016 population of 1,218. With a land area of 2.79 km^{2} (1.08 sq mi), it had a population density of 448.0/km^{2} (1,160.4/sq mi) in 2021.

== Arts and culture ==
As a small community Bayfield has many yearly traditions which include the Bayfield Fair in August, and Christmas in Bayfield, which takes place the weekend after Remembrance Day and includes the lighting of the trees in Clan Gregor Square as well as an annual Christmas Parade. Other annual events include the Fireman's Breakfast, Pioneer Park 5k Run, Santa Run, Halloween Witches Walk, and Corvette Fest and Volks Fest.

Bayfield has a large croquet club, with some members competing internationally.

The Bayfield Historical Society operates a heritage centre containing historic artifacts, newspapers, and photographs. Tours are available.

== Infrastructure ==
=== Transportation ===
Bayfield is located on Kings Highway 21 which is also known as Bluewater Highway, 20 kilometres (12 mi) south of Goderich.

== Gallery ==
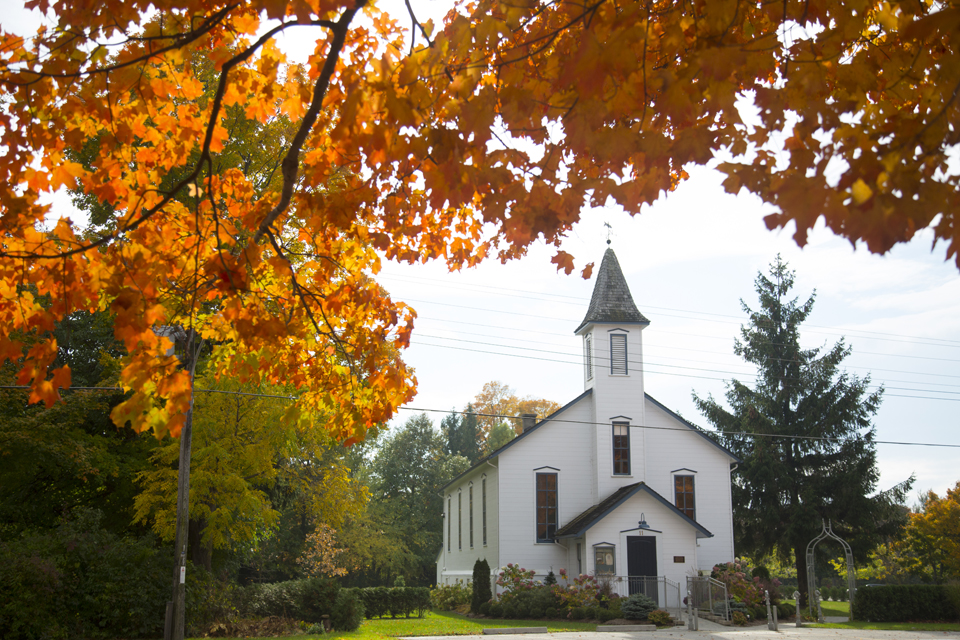
Bayfield's Town Hall

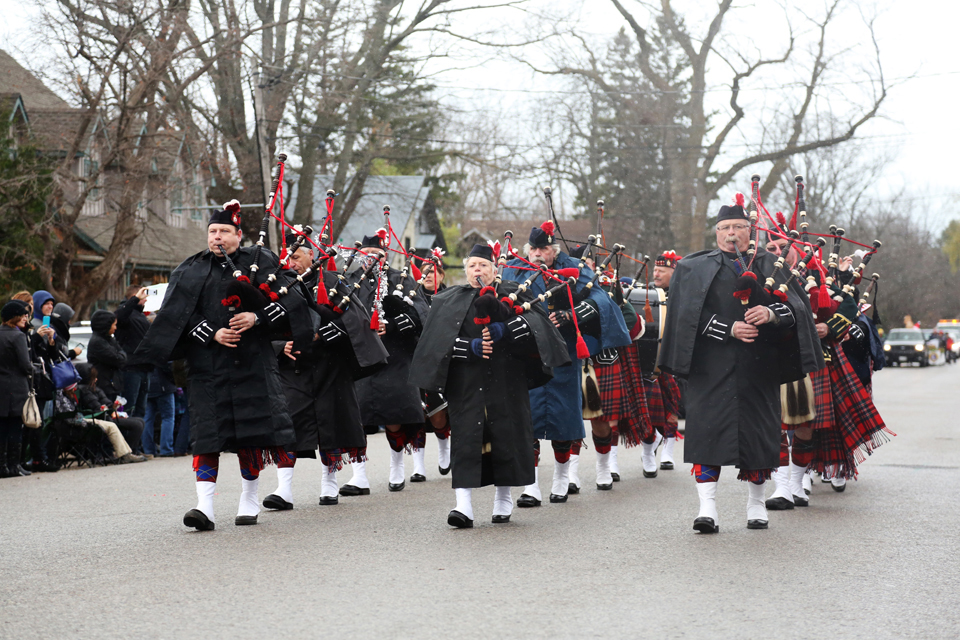
Bayfield Christmas Parade

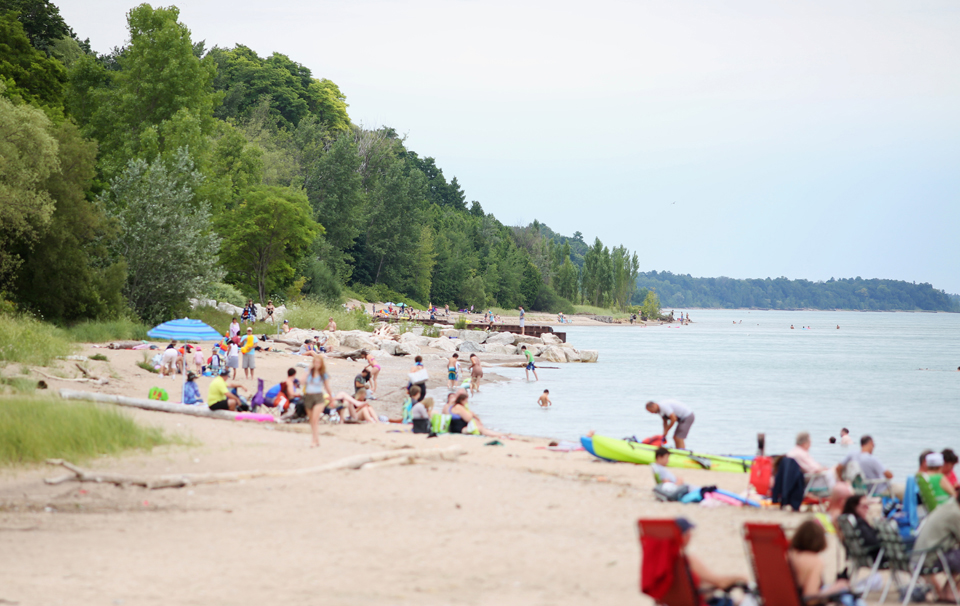
Bayfield's Main Beach

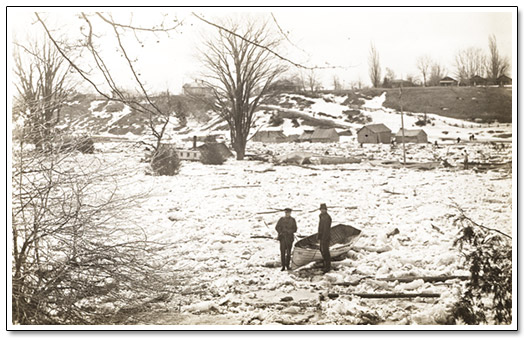
In 1904, Bayfield had an ice flood
