= King's University College, University of Western Ontario =

Affiliated university college of the University of Western Ontario

King's University College
- Coat of arms of King's University College
- Former names: Christ the King College (1954–1966); King's College (1966–2004); King's University College (2004–present)
- Motto: Christus Via Veritas Et Vita
- Motto in English: Christ is the Way the Truth and the Life
- Type: Affiliated college
- Established: 1954
- Religious affiliation: Catholic
- Academic affiliations: University of Western Ontario; AUCC; IAU; COU; CIS; ACU; IFCU; ACCU; St. Peter's Seminary; Catholic Diocese of London
- President: Robert Ventresca
- Academic staff: 173
- Undergraduates: 3,749
- Postgraduates: 59
- Location: London, Ontario, Canada; 43°0′42″N 81°15′27″W
- Campus: Urban/suburban
- Colours: Gold & green
- Website: www.kings.uwo.ca

King's University College (commonly shortened to King's) is a university college in London, Ontario, Canada, affiliated with St. Peter's Seminary and the University of Western Ontario.

It is a Catholic, co-educational, liberal arts college. Originally named Christ the King College, the school was founded to provide the all-male seminary with education in the liberal arts. The school was founded in 1954 and first began holding classes in 1955.

King's is the largest affiliated college of the University of Western Ontario and enrolls 3,500 students. The university college offers programs in arts, social science, childhood and social institutions, management and organizational studies, social justice and peace studies, social work, and theology through its affiliation with St. Peter's Seminary.

== History ==
=== Founding ===
King's was founded as the College of Christ the King in 1954, at which time it was an all-male college affiliated with St. Peter's Seminary.

A group of local clerics, headed by London Bishop John Christopher Cody, along with Monsignors Roney and Mahoney and Fathers McCarthy, Feeney, and Finn began to meet to discuss plans for a new college in 1954. The purpose of the new institution was to provide a liberal arts education for Catholic lay men studying at St. Peter's Seminary.

Crest of Christ the King College

In March 1945, Bishop John C. Cody chaired a meeting at the Hotel London and announced that the Diocese of London would establish an arts college, called Christ the King College, which was to be affiliated with the University of Western Ontario. A discussion on 22 March, resolved several key issues pertaining to the size and location of the new building. Initially the structure was to be located close to Ursuline College because of its proximity to the university campus. However, "because of the attendance of the seminarians and the necessity of staff going from the Seminary to the new College, the site on the Seminary grounds is more favourable". The 10-acre (40,000 m^{2}) parcel of land upon which the college would be built was donated by St. Peter's Seminary to the Episcopal Corporation of the Diocese of London. Upon completion, this new building was to house about one hundred men and be the cornerstone of the new college.

By 9 June 1954, all the estimates had been received and it was decided to award the contact to the Pigott Construction Company of Hamilton, which completed the building for a final cost of $1.5 million. Construction of the new building that was to become Christ the King College (now Monsignor Wemple Building) began in June 1954. The ground was blessed and broken by Bishop Cody and the corner-stone for the Monsignor Lester A. Wemple Hall laid by Cardinal McGuigan of Toronto in the company of the Papal Delegate to Canada, John Panico. A ceremony marked the official opening of Christ the King College on 14 September 1955. Assembled at the top of the steps of the new institution were the leaders of London's educational, political and religious communities, while on the front lawn a crowd of about 300 persons - largely priests, nuns, and seminarians.

Initially, the college consisted of 55 double residence rooms, seven classrooms, a library, a dining hall, two recreation rooms and a chapel. The all-male faculty and administration were composed largely of priests from St. Peter's Seminary. The first class that enrolled in September 1955 was 46 men in total, by 1958 150 full-time students were registered.

=== Incorporation ===
Since its founding, King's was formally owned and governed by the diocese. In 1972, King's took responsibility for the overall operations and governance of the college. The incorporation process was the next step in the maturation of the King's as a major Catholic university in Canada. The transfer, which has been under discussion for a number of years, was approved by the Vatican in August 2012. As part of the transfer, King's will obtain official ownership of the land and buildings currently held in its footprint. The transfer was completed in December 2013 after various government regulatory processes were completed.

=== Name change ===
The name was changed to King's College in 1966 after it became affiliated with the University of Western Ontario. Unlike Brescia and Huron, other affiliated colleges of the University of Western Ontario, King's initially did not adopt the "University College" designation (owing to an institution with a similar name, The King's University College, in Edmonton). The designation became part of the name in 2004. The current name was adopted in 2012.

== Campus ==
Map of King's University College

King's University College is situated in the city of London, Ontario, located in the southwestern end of the Quebec City – Windsor Corridor. The university college is located adjacent to the Thames River, across from the Richmond Gates of University of Western Ontario. The majority of the campus is surrounded by residential neighbourhoods, with Epworth Ave bisecting the campus.

The college's first classes were held in Monsignor Wemple Building. The Monsignor Wemple Building remained the sole educational facility until 1982, when the school began using lecture theatres in Dante Lenardon Hall. The buildings at King's University College vary in age from Wemple Hall which was completed in 1954, to the Darryl J. King Student Life Centre, completed in 2014.

=== Academic facilities ===
King's was originally located in what is now the Monsignor Wemple Building on the north side of Epworth Avenue, with classrooms, the original Monsignor Wemple Library, chapel, offices, and dining hall located on the lower and ground floor, and living quarters on the upper floors. The Lester A. Wemple Library was expanded in 1970 and again in 1980. The college building further expanded in 1970 to include two lecture halls and additional classrooms.

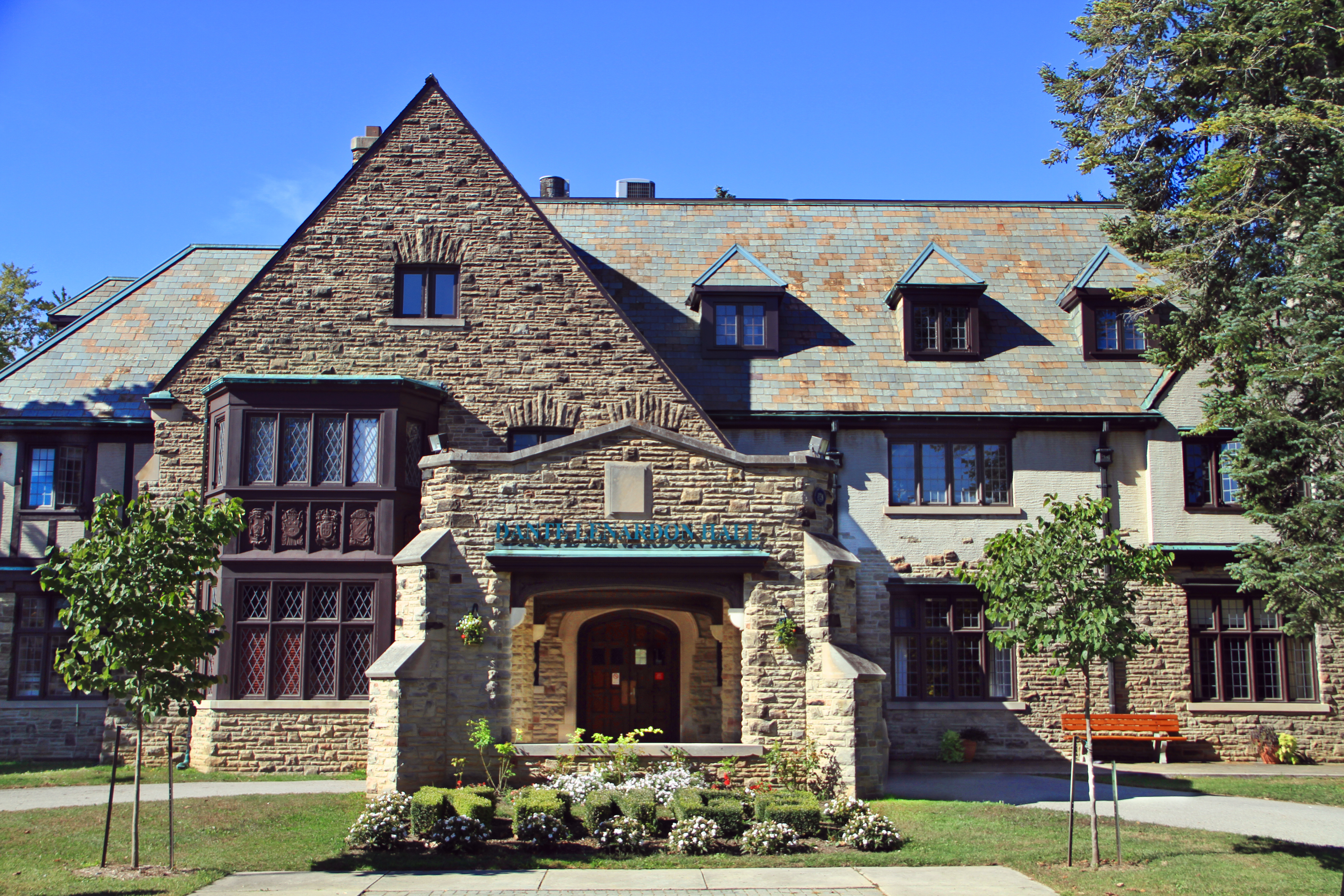
The Silverwood Annex, now known as Dante Lenardon Hall

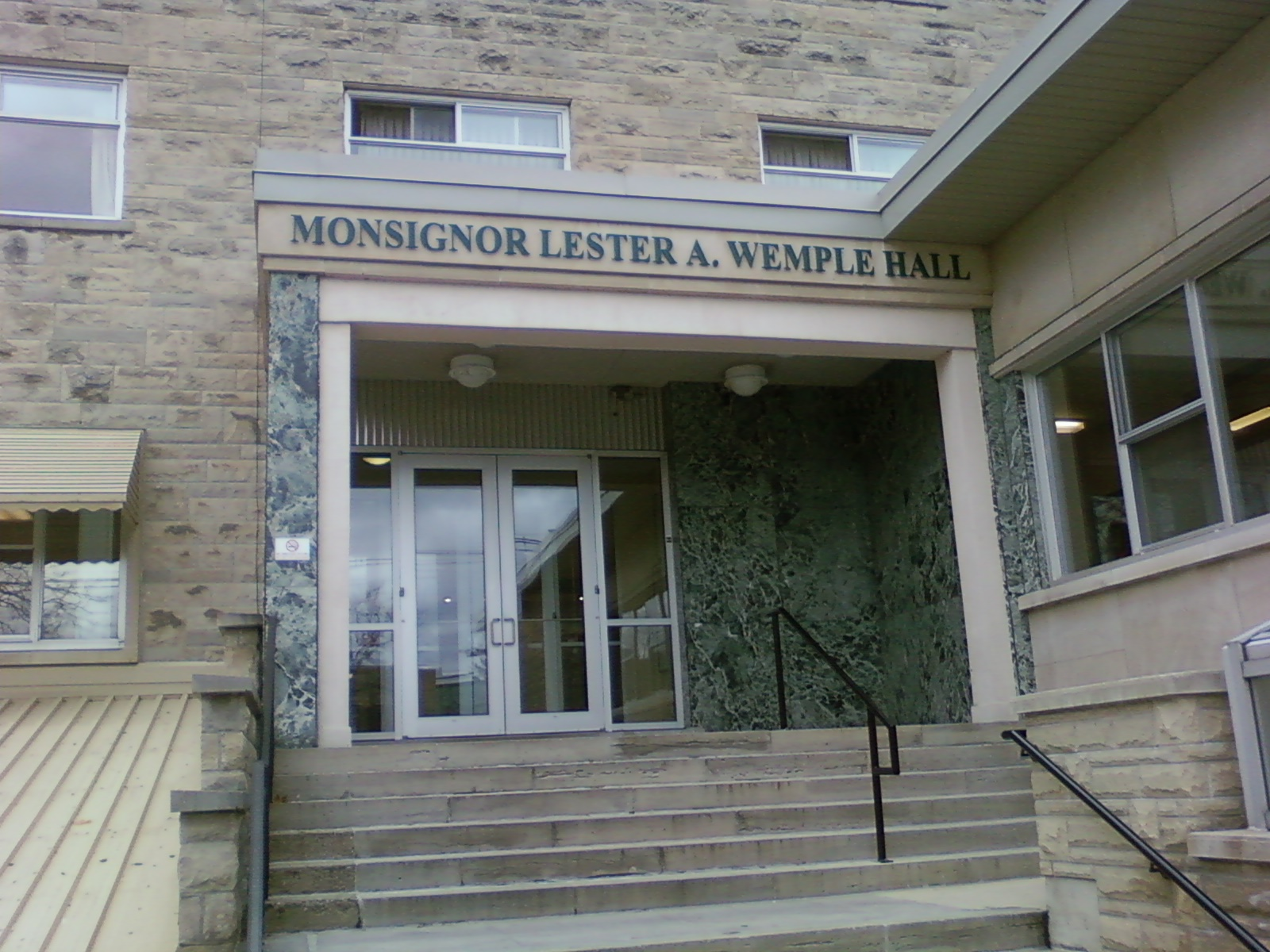
Wemple Hall, the school's first building

In 1982, King's began using the lecture theatres additional lecture theatres located in the Silverwood Annex of the Silverwood mansion on Waterloo Street, now known as Dante Lenardon Hall, named after a well respected emeritus professor.

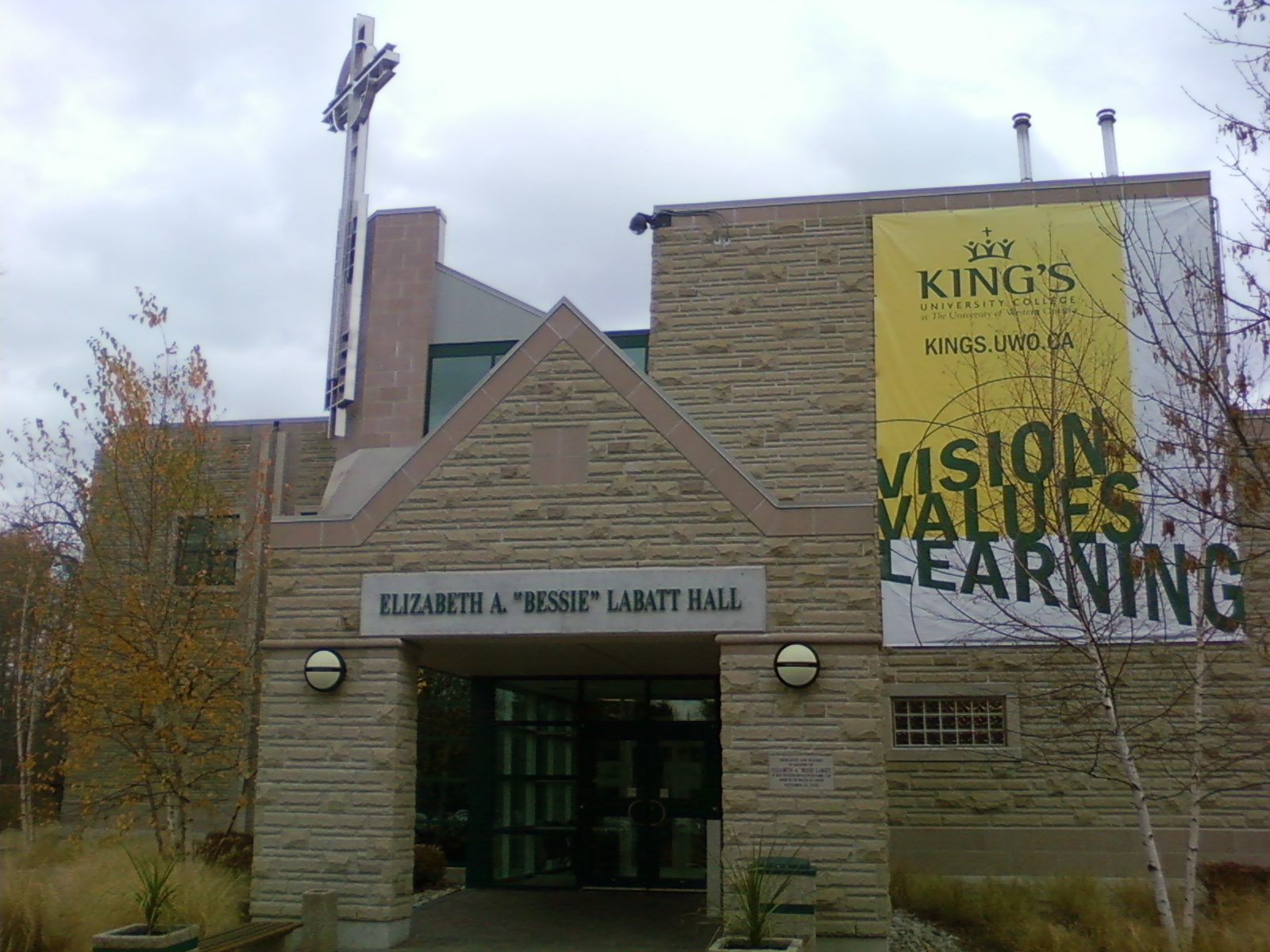
Elizabeth A. "Bessie" Labatt Hall

An additional building, Elizabeth A. "Bessie" Labatt Hall, was opened between the library and mansion in 2003, and features three lecture halls, an auditorium that can be split into three classrooms, faculty offices, and a large atrium.

In 2008, the school purchased and renovated what was the London Hebrew Day School, and formerly the (Middlesex county) pre-city country school known as Broughdale on Epworth Avenue. In 1961, following the annexation of the Broughdale area by the city of London, the Broughdale School became part of the London public school system. Declining enrolment led to the school's closure in 1977. In 1979, the building became the London Community Hebrew Day School.

The building has gone through multiple renovations and alterations since it first opened in 1920. The original portico has been removed as part of the 1946 alteration and the original roof line was lowered as part of a renovation that added substantially to the building's overall width to provide two additional classrooms and a principal's office. A rear addition was added in the latest major renovation during the 1960s.

On 11 March 2009, the former Hebrew Dale School was rededicated as Broughdale Hall. The dedication ceremony was officiated by King's Chaplin Reverend Michael D. Béchard and Rabbi Ammos Chrony of Or Shalom Synagogue. The building houses lecture halls, as well as the CultureWorks offices.

=== Library ===
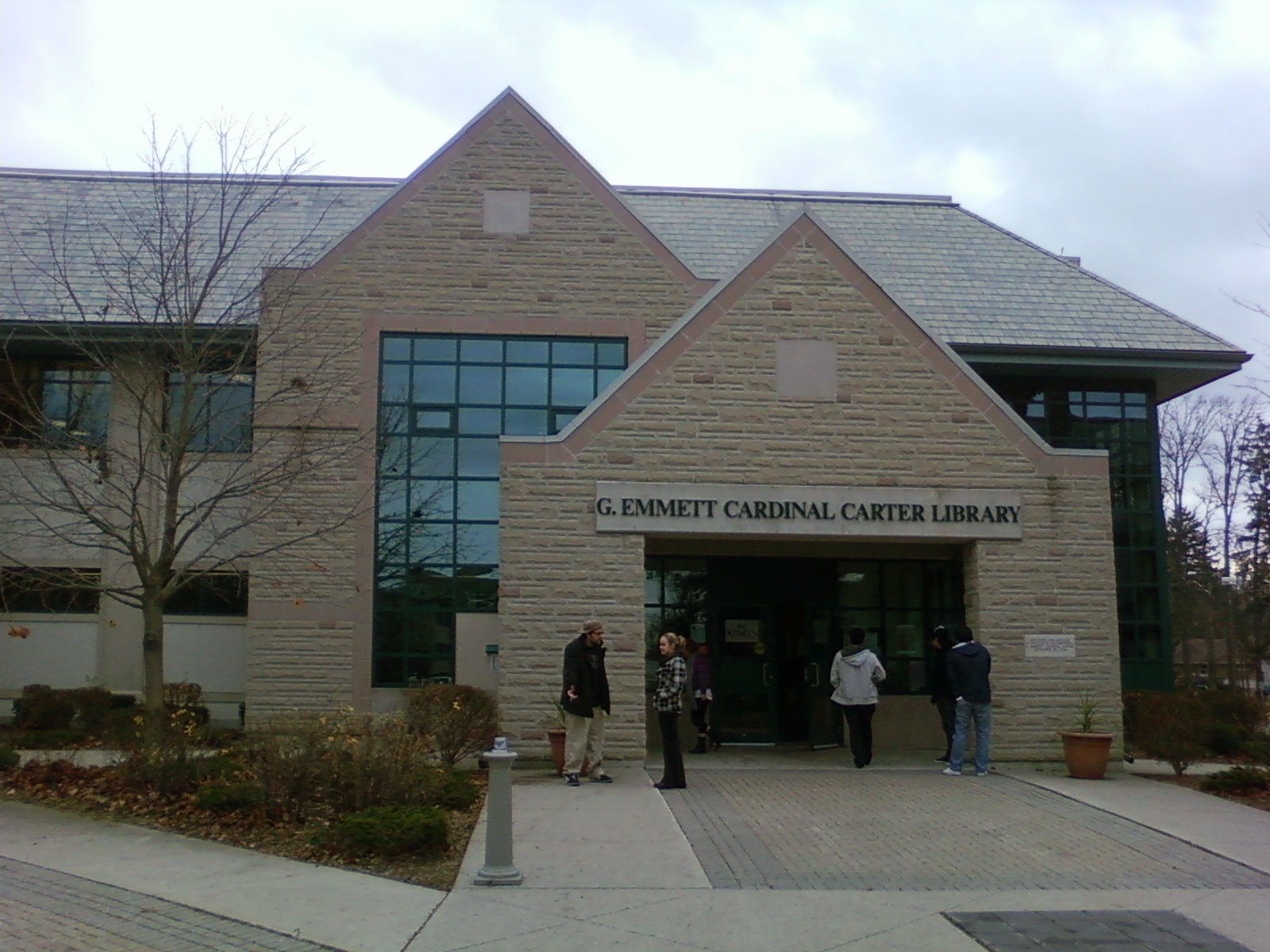
Cardinal Carter Library

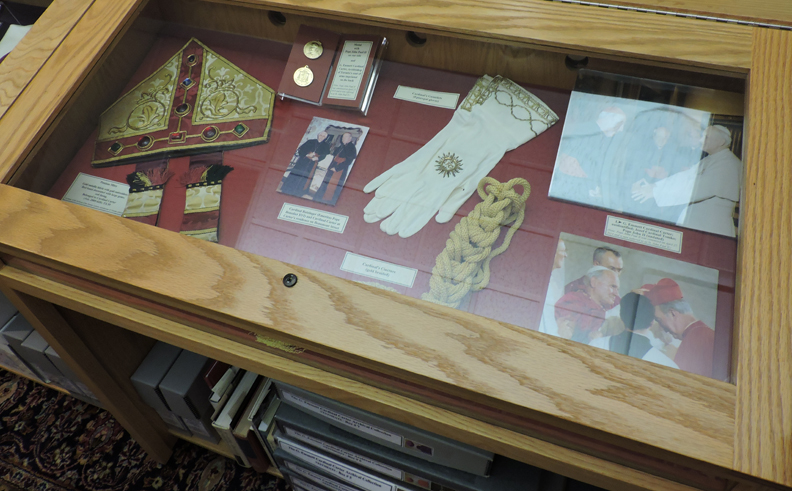
Artifacts from G. Emmett Cardinal Carter on display in the Eaton Room

Construction of a new two-story library began in July 1994 along Waterloo Street, adjacent to Silverwood mansion now known as Dante Lenardon Hall. The library is named after Cardinal Carter, formerly Bishop of London. The original library became a student lounge, and the Monsignor Wemple name became the name of the original college building. Construction of the library completed in June 1995 and the formal opening was held on 29 September 1995.

In addition to research resources, the library includes the Eaton Special Collections Room named in honour of the Eaton Foundation. The Eaton Room houses rare and archival material, including over 750 volumes dating from late 14th through 18th centuries.

Shortly after the formal opening the library attracted an international photography exhibit Echoes of Ancient Egypt which featured the archival collection of the Royal Geographical Society. In 2011 the library was host to The Human Library, which allowed the public to loan specialty and rare books for the duration of the event.

=== Housing and student facilities ===
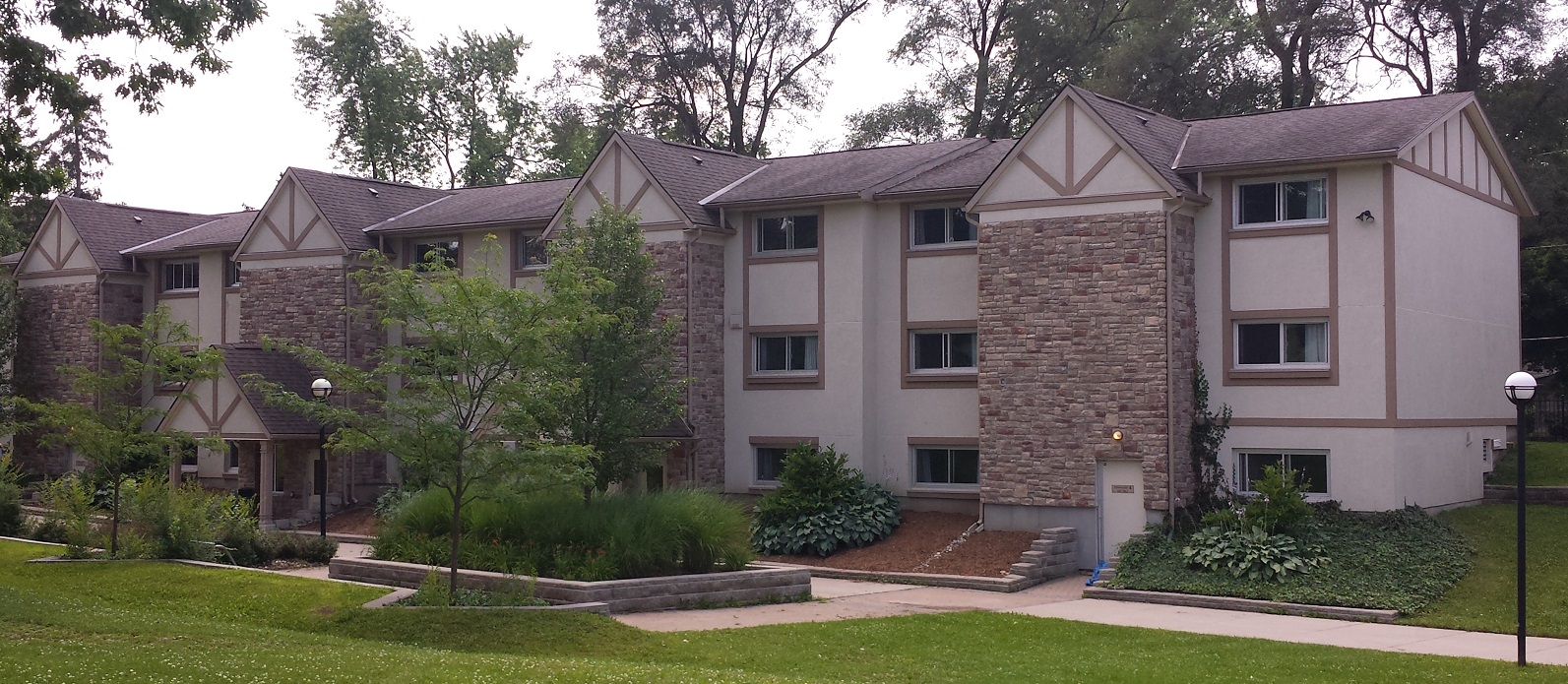
Townhouse style student residence

The residence buildings available for students are the upper two levels of the Wemple building, Alumni Court and ten town-house units.

In 2010 the university college purchased a two-story house located near the Cardinal Carter Library. This building has since been named International House and is used to house international exchange students and for meeting space for social events. Incoming exchange students are guaranteed space at King's Residence, and may choose to stay in the private rooms at the International House. The King's Community Garden is located in the backyard of the International House.

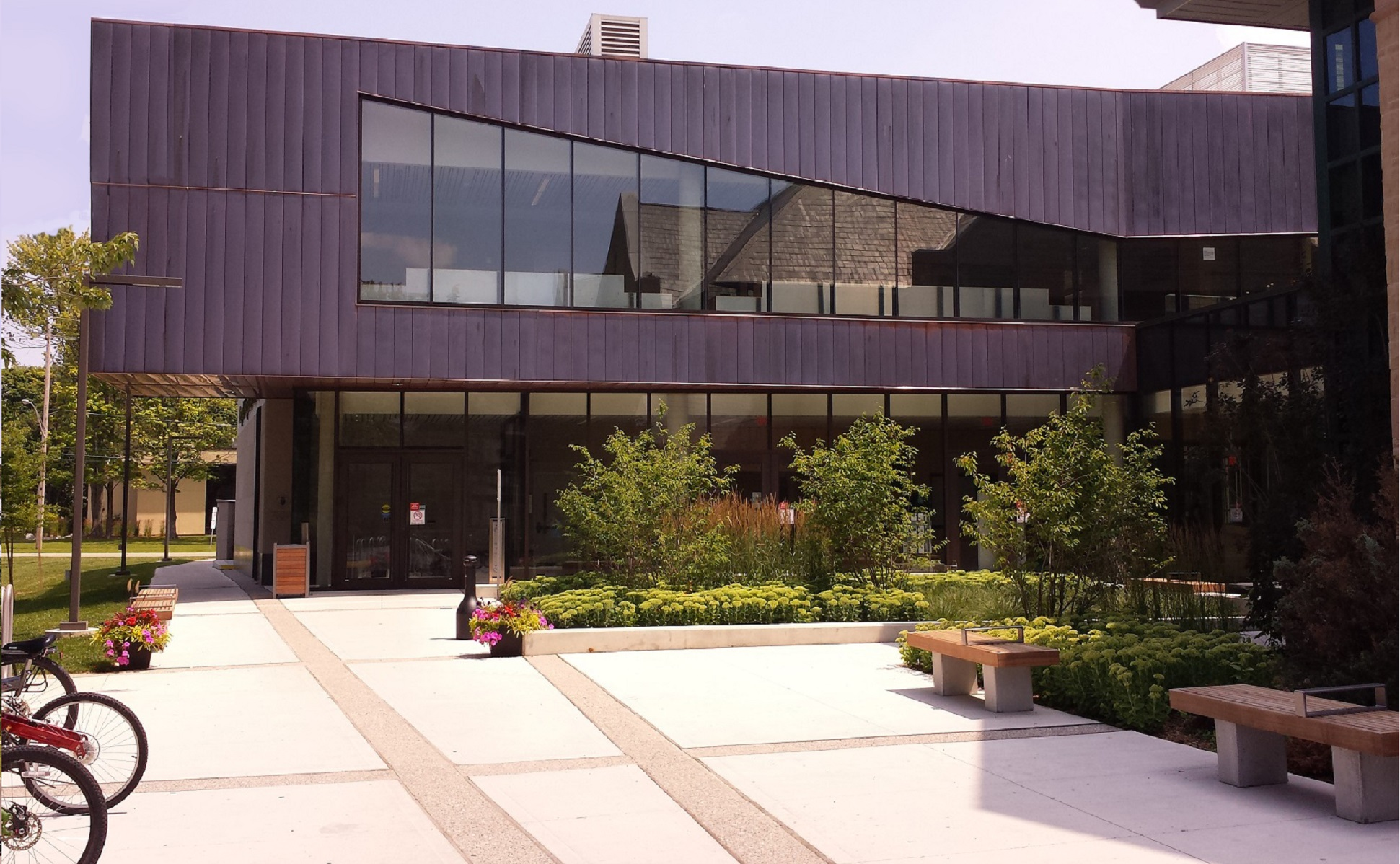
Darryl J. King Student Life Centre

The Darryl J. King Student Life Centre is the centre of student life, and student government programming. The Student Life Centre combines a café, learning lounge, a 490-seat auditorium, fitness space, meeting rooms, games room and classrooms.

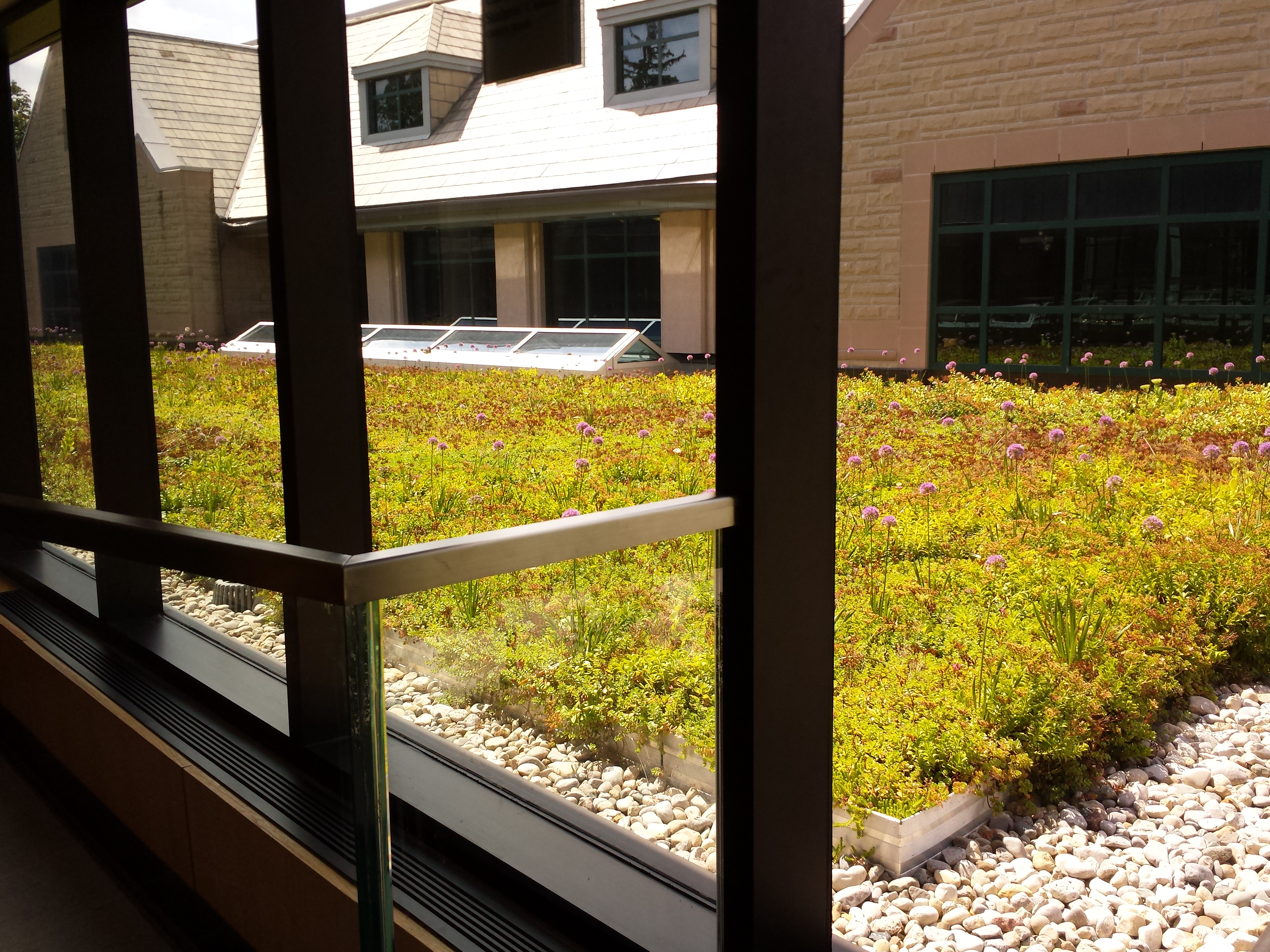
Green roof atop the Darryl J. King Student Life Centre

The King Student Life Centre is a 3,539 square metres (38,090 sq ft) two-story (plus full basement) building, designed by Perkins+Will in association with Cornerstone Architecture and built by K & L Construction.

In 2011 the school began fund-raising for the building of the Darryl J. King Student Life Centre, a community and recreational centre for the college that is physically connected to the Cardinal Carter Library. The cornerstone of the building was dedicated and blessed by Reverend Michael D. Béchard on 29 September 2012. A video on the progress of the Student Life Centre was uploaded on the King's University Website. King's released a thank you video to all of their donors in support of the Darryl J. King Student Life Centre. Construction of the Student Life Centre was completed in 2013 at a cost of $14.7 million, and the grand opening ceremony held on 7 January 2014.

=== Sustainability ===
Campus sustainability at King's is managed by The Green Team and Physical Plant department as directed by the Strategic Plan. Independent initiatives and projects are also run by faculty, student clubs, and the King's University College Students' Council.

In 2012, King's completed an environmental and sustainability audit as part of the strategic commitment "To create an environmentally sustainable College". Graham Casselman, who led the audit gave a presentation to the King's community on 21 August in which he outlined his findings. The audit recommended changes to inter-campus transportation to reduce the environmental impact. In response the university college added a new propane powered shuttle bus to the vehicle lineup. This vehicle is a collaboration with Aboutown the goal of the smaller size bus and its and use of propane is to help reduce the environmental impact.

The Green Team is the environmental committee responsible for multiple initiatives at the university college. In 2011 the Green Team's Chair, Sarah Morrison, earned an Honourable Mention at the University of Western Ontario Green Awards for her environmental work. The committee collects funds through campus initiatives including annual perennial plant sale and sales of reusable, metal water bottles featuring the King's logo. The Green Team also holds biannual events in which volunteers from the King's community come together each fall and spring to comb the campus gathering misplaced garbage and recyclables. The Green Team also works within the greater community with their support of various environmental-awareness campaigns.

Conservationists from a Southwestern Ontario wildlife rehabilitation centre, in partnership with King's University College rescued chimney swifts roosting on campus. In 2015, five baby swifts were successfully released from the roof of King's University College.

The Physical Plant department has partnered with Aevitas Inc. to provide recycling of on campus materials such as light bulbs from classrooms, dorms, and offices. In 2009, the college successfully diverted and recycled 550 light bulbs – producing 158.4 kg of glass, 1.97 kg of metals, 2.48 kg of phosphor and 0.016 kg of mercury. The Physical Plant department maintains drop boxes on campus which are used to collect used cell phones and batteries that are then appropriately recycled. The department also collects used ink toners from on-campus photocopiers and printers, and also accepts household printer cartridges that are then appropriately recycled.

Students' Council runs initiatives independent of the Strategic Plan to promote environmental sustainability on university college campus. The King's Community Garden is located in the backyard of the International House in London Ontario at King's University College at Western University. This garden is volunteer based, with the goal of providing a sustainable alternative to buying groceries, and with the intent of teaching students how to create and maintain their own gardens. Students and other community members are in charge of planting, harvesting and maintaining the garden. The councils bike program is referred to as Kings Wheels. Founded in 2010 by Paul Di Libero, Kings Wheels was established to provide the students of Kings University College with an alternative method of transportation that is reliable, physically active, and furthermore environmentally friendly.

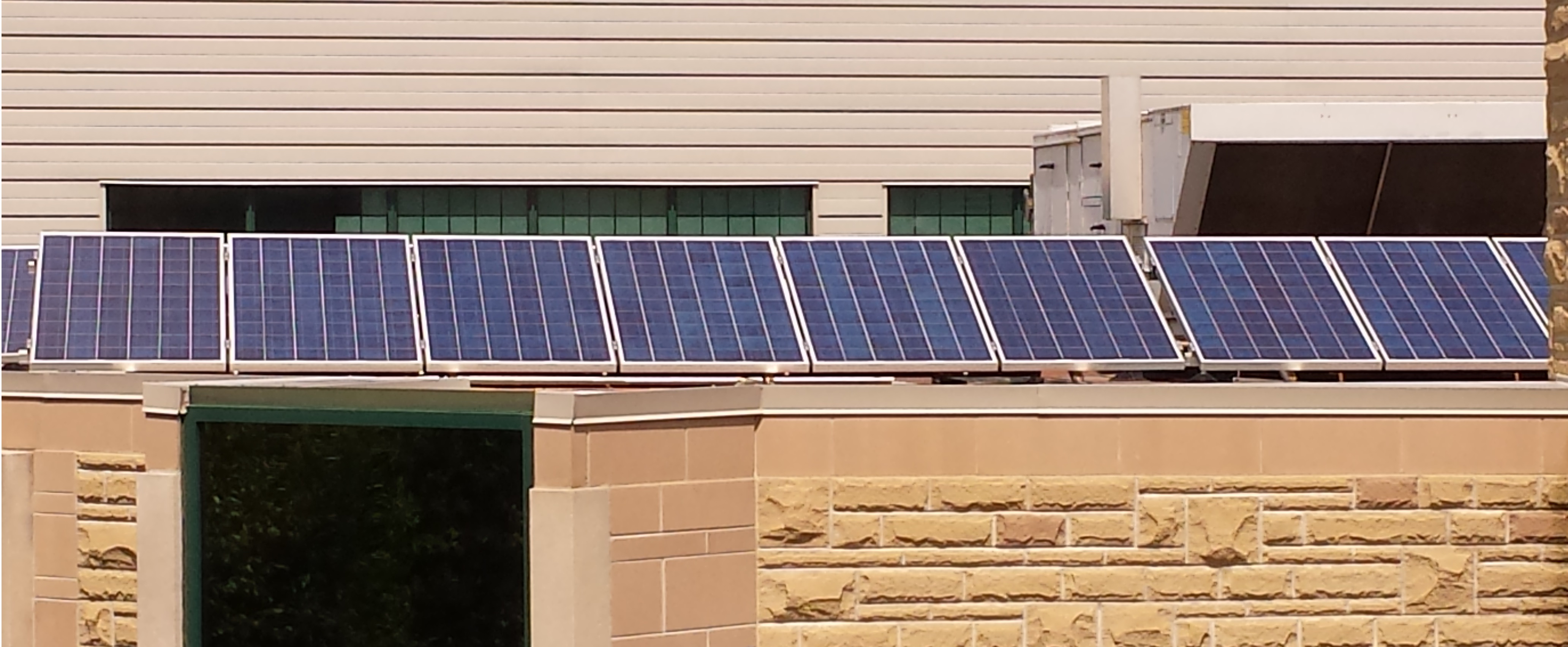
A solar panel installation on the roof of Labatt Hall

==== Solar power ====
In June 2010 the university college was accepted by The Ontario Power Authority for the installation of a 10 kW solar panel system. A structural engineer was hired to work out the optimum panel layout within the load parameters of the roof structure. The 48 panels and associated infrastructure were installed in November 2010 on the roof of Wemple Hall. The installation began generating electricity in February 2011.

The solar panel system was expanded an additional 10 kW with the installation of solar panels on the roof of Labatt Hall.

Since the installation came online, it has been able to generate up to 150 kWh. The university college feeds the electricity generated into the London Hydro grid, and generates more than $10,000 per year in revenue.

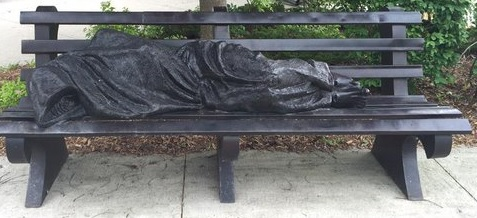
Homeless Jesus sculpture in 2016

=== Art and sculptures ===
A replica of a statue depicting Jesus as a homeless person asleep on a park bench was installed at King's University College as a gift to the community from Christ the King University Parish. Jesus the Homeless, along with another statue depicting Jesus washing feet, were donated to King's as part of the Student Life Campaign. Both statues were installed outside the Darryl J. King Student Life Centre in 2013. The statue was designed by Canadian artist, Timothy Schmalz. In Rome, Pope Francis prayed over and blessed the original statue, and met with the artist.

== Academics ==
King's has approximately 3600 students, almost all of whom are undergraduates. Programs offered at King's are described fully on the school's website, made available below. For instance, King's is becoming known for its competitive-entry King's Foundations in the Humanities, a first-year plan of study that explores history, literature, and philosophy, and for Social Justice and Peace Studies, a four-year cross-disciplinary program.

Although there is a heavy emphasis on undergraduate studies, there is also a full or part-time graduate program in social work. The direct practice social work program has partnered with local, and provincial governments to open the London Poverty Research Centre at King's. By virtue of King's affiliation with St. Peter's Seminary, Master of Theological Studies and Master of Divinity degrees are also offered.

=== Undergraduate programs ===
- Arts (Catholic Studies, Catholic Studies for Teachers, English Language and Literature, French Language and Literature, French Studies, Jewish Studies, Middle East Studies, Philosophy, Religion and Society, Religious Studies, Social and Political Thought)

Specialized Programs

- Childhood and Youth Studies
- Disability Studies
- Finance and Wealth Management (combined program with a 2-year diploma from Fanshawe College)
- Human Rights Studies
- Social Justice and Peace Studies
- Thanatology

Social Science

- Analytics and Decision Sciences
- Criminology
- History
- Politics and International Relations
- Psychology
- Applied Psychology
- Sociology

School of Management, Economics and Mathematics (MEM)

Specialized degree programs in:

- Economics
- Finance
- Financial Economics
- Accounting
- Global Commerce
- Organizational & Human Resources

Social Work

- Bachelor of Social Work (BSW)
- Master of Social Work (MSW)

=== Professional Pathway Programs ===
- Ivey Business School (HBA)
- Western Education
- Social Work (MSW)

=== CultureWorks ESL ===
For more than ten years, King's has maintained a partnership with CultureWorks ESL, an English as a Second Language school, whose offices are located on site in Broughdale Hall. Students who successfully complete the CultureWorks program are granted entrance to King's. CultureWorks has funded a scholarship for graduates of its ESL program attending King's.

=== Rankings and distinctions ===
The university college received an A+ rating for class size, and an A rating in Overall Student Satisfaction, Quality of Teaching, Campus Atmosphere, Libraries, and Athletics on the Globe and Mail 2008, 2009, 2010, 2011 and 2012 Canadian University Reports.

=== Enrolment ===
(as of Fall 2014)

- Undergraduate Enrolment: 3221 full-time, 528 part-time
- Graduate Enrolment: 20 full-time, 39 part-time
- Average Class Size: 42
- Student to Faculty Ratio: 22:1
- Number of Faculty: 97
- Number of Full-time Faculty: 76

== Student life ==
King's students are represented by three student unions; the King's University College Students' Council, which represents the general student population, the Social Work Students' Association Council, which represents the students enrolled in the professional degree program offered through the School of Social Work, and the King's Residence Council, which represents the interests of the residence students specifically.

The Students' Council, is a student-run organization providing services and activities ranging from administering a medical and dental plan to concerts and orientation activities.

The Residence Council serves as a link connecting the residence students, King's University College Student Council (KUCSC) and the college community as a whole. The council works to enhance residence life and to coordinate activities to benefit residence students. The council consists of representatives elected in September from each residence unit. The thirty unit representatives may then run for the positions of president and vice-president. All residents are eligible to vote in the election of those two offices. The position of Council Secretary, Treasurer, and Promotions Coordinator are elected within the Council itself.

=== Media ===
The Regis is a student-run, and funded magazine first published in 2009. The magazine editions are published quarterly by King's University College Students' Council of King's University College at the University of Western Ontario. It serves the student readership by reporting the news, entertaining readers, and promoting debate on issues involving the King's and Western community and the City of London.

=== King's Cultural Festival ===
King's Cultural Festival is an annual event first held in 2003. The festival is the largest annual multicultural event on campus attended by close to 300 people from across Western and the city of London. Performances showcasing various cultural traditions may include: dance, singing, poetry, acrobatics, story-telling, country presentations and more.

=== University Parish ===
On 25 November 2005, Ronald P. Fabbro, Bishop of London, decreed that Christ the King University Parish be established to serve the Catholic faithful connected to the University of Western Ontario.

Christ the King University Parish, formerly Holy Spirit Parish, offers Catholic services daily in the chapel at Monsignor Wemple Building, and on Sundays at Elizabeth A. "Bessie" Labatt Hall. These services are intended for and tailored to university students, but are open to the public.

The King's University College Chamber Choir was established in September 2010, and consists of auditioned choral singers from the King's University College, Western University and London communities.

== People ==
See List of King's University College people

=== Notable alumni ===
- Vince Agro - Former Mayor of Hamilton, Ontario, Giller Prize nominated author (BA 1962)
- Sandy Annunziata - Grey Cup winning football player, former Fort Erie Town Councillor and current Niagara Regional Councillor for the town. (began degree in 1988, completed BA degree in 2004)
- Archbishop of Toronto Thomas Cardinal Collins - (Bachelor of Theology from St. Peters Seminary 1973)
- Sheila Copps - Former Deputy Prime Minister of Canada (BA 1974)
- John Cummins - former Member of Parliament, past leader of the British Columbia Conservative Party (BA 1966)
- Robert Anthony Daniels - Current Bishop of Grand Falls, Newfoundland - (Masters of Divinity 1983)
- Cody Deaner - real name Chris Grey, Professional Wrestler (BA 2005)
- Brian Joseph Dunn - Bishop of Antigonish, ex-officious Chancellor of St. Francis Xavier University (BA 1976, M.Div. 1979)
- Matt Dzieduszycki professional hockey player (attended 2002)
- Juggan Kazim - Real name Mehr Bano, Pakistani-Canadian actress and television host.
- David Lee - Grey Cup winning football defensive end (BA 2012)
- William Terrence McGrattan - Auxiliary Bishop for the Archdiocese of Toronto (M.Div. 1987 from St. Peter's Seminary)
- John Melady - Canadian non-fiction author (BA 1962)
- Pat O'Brien - former Member of Parliament (BA 1971)
- Anne Marie Owens - Editor of The National Post newspaper (BA 1986)
- Brent Shea - Retired Deputy Chief of the London Ontario Police Department.
- Karen Stintz - Toronto mayoral candidate (BA 1992)

=== Notable faculty ===
- Laurier LaPierre - Professor during the early 1960s. Later appointed to the Senate of Canada

== Principals & Presidents ==
Principal	Held Office
Monsignor Lester Albert Wemple	1955–1965
Bishop Eugene La Rocque	1965–1968
Owen Carrigan	1968–1971
Arnold McKee	1971–1976
John D. Morgan	1976–1985
Phillip Mueller	1985–1997
Gerald Killan	1997–2009
David Sylvester	2009–2018
David C. Malloy	2019–2024
Robert Ventresca	2024–present
