= Melady =

Melady is a surname. Notable people with the surname include:

- John Melady (born 1938), Canadian writer
- Nicholas Melady (1845–1869), Canadian convicted murderer
- Thomas Patrick Melady (1927–2014), American diplomat and author

== See also ==
- Melody (disambiguation)
