= List of King's University College people =

This page is a list of notable people connected to King's University College at the University of Western Ontario.

== Notable alumni ==
=== Politics and government ===
- Vince Agro - former Mayor of Hamilton, Ontario, Giller Prize nominated author (BA 1962)
- Joe Ceci - Member of the Legislative Assembly of Alberta, Albertan Minister of Finance (BA 1980)
- Sheila Copps - former Deputy Prime Minister of Canada, Officer of the Order of Canada (BA 1974)
- Ed Corrigan - former London Ontario city councillor (BA 1977)
- John Cummins - former Member of Parliament, past leader of the British Columbia Conservative Party (BA 1966)
- Amir Farahi - Executive Director of the London Institute; political commentator (BA 2013)
- Peter Fragiskatos - Member of Parliament (BA 2004)
- Pat O'Brien - former Member of Parliament (BA 1971)
- Jake Skinner - London, Ontario School Board Trustee (BA)
- Karen Stintz - Toronto mayoral candidate (BA 1992)
- Sandy White - former London Ontario city councillor (BSW 1991, MSW 2008)

=== Sports, athletics ===
- Sandy Annunziata - Grey Cup-winning football player, former Fort Erie City Councillor (began degree in 1988, completed BA degree in 2004)
- Craig Butler - Canadian Football League player (BA 2013)
- Rory Connop - Canadian Football League player (BA 2015)
- Cody Deaner, real name Chris Grey - professional wrestler (BA 2005)
- Matt Dzieduszycki professional hockey player (attended 2002)
- David Lee - Grey Cup winning football defensive end (BA 2012)
- Vaughn Martin - NFL football player (attended 2009, did not graduate)
- Danny Syvret - NHL hockey player (attended 2004, did not graduate)

=== Arts and journalism ===
- Kelley Armstrong - Canadian fiction author
- Mary Intven-Wallace - children's author (BA 1973)
- Juggan Kazim, real name Mehr Bano - Pakistani-Canadian actress and television host
- John Melady - Canadian non-fiction author (BA 1962)
- Anne Marie Owens - editor of The National Post newspaper (BA 1986)
- Jennifer Robson - historical fiction author (BA 1992)
- Ed Struzik - Michener Award-winning journalist and novelist (BA 1977)

=== Religion and law enforcement ===
- Archbishop of Toronto Thomas Cardinal Collins (Bachelor of Theology from St. Peters Seminary 1973)
- Robert Anthony Daniels - Bishop of Grand Falls, Newfoundland
- Brian Joseph Dunn - Bishop of Antigonish, ex-officio Chancellor of St. Francis Xavier University (BA 1976, M.Div. 1979)
- William Terrence McGrattan - Auxiliary Bishop for the Archdiocese of Toronto (M.Div. 1987 from St. Peter's Seminary)
- Brent Shea - Deputy Chief of the London Ontario Police Department; Member of the Order of Merit of the Police Forces (BA 1980)

== Notable faculty ==
- Carol Hopkins - Professor of Social Work, Officer of the Order of Canada.
- Laurier LaPierre - professor during the early 1960s; later appointed to the Senate of Canada
- Dante Leonardon - 1990 Canadian Professor of the Year (now Professor Emeritus)
- Paul Werstine FRSC- Shakespeare expert, co-editor of Folger Shakespeare Library editions
