= CHWC-FM =

Radio station in Goderich, Ontario

Goderich, Ontario; Canada
- Broadcast area: Western Huron County
- Frequency: 104.9 MHz
- Branding: Country 104.9

Programming
- Format: Country

Ownership
- Owner: Bayshore Broadcasting
- Sister stations: CHGB-FM

History
- First air date: 15 October 2007
- Call sign meaning: County of Huron's West Coast

Technical information
- Class: B1
- ERP: 5,330 watts
- HAAT: 110 metres (360 ft)
- Transmitter coordinates: 43.7312750°N 81.6944878°W

Links
- Webcast: Listen Live
- Website: country1049.ca

CHWC-FM is a Canadian radio station that broadcasts a country format at 104.9 FM in Goderich, Ontario. The station uses the on-air brand name Country 104.9. CHWC broadcasts music, morning shows, and weather, in addition to local, National and International news.

On 20 February 2007, the CRTC approved Bayshore Broadcasting's application to operate a new FM radio station at Goderich. The station began regular broadcasting on 15 October 2007.

Previously an adult contemporary station, on 2 January 2018, the station flipped to country branded as Country 104.9.
