= Goderich Airport =

Canadian airport

Goderich Airport Goderich Municipal Airport
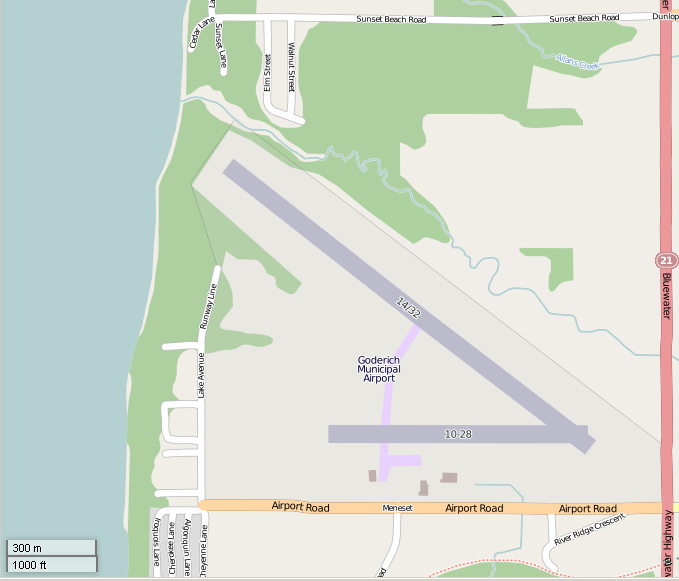
- Map of the airport

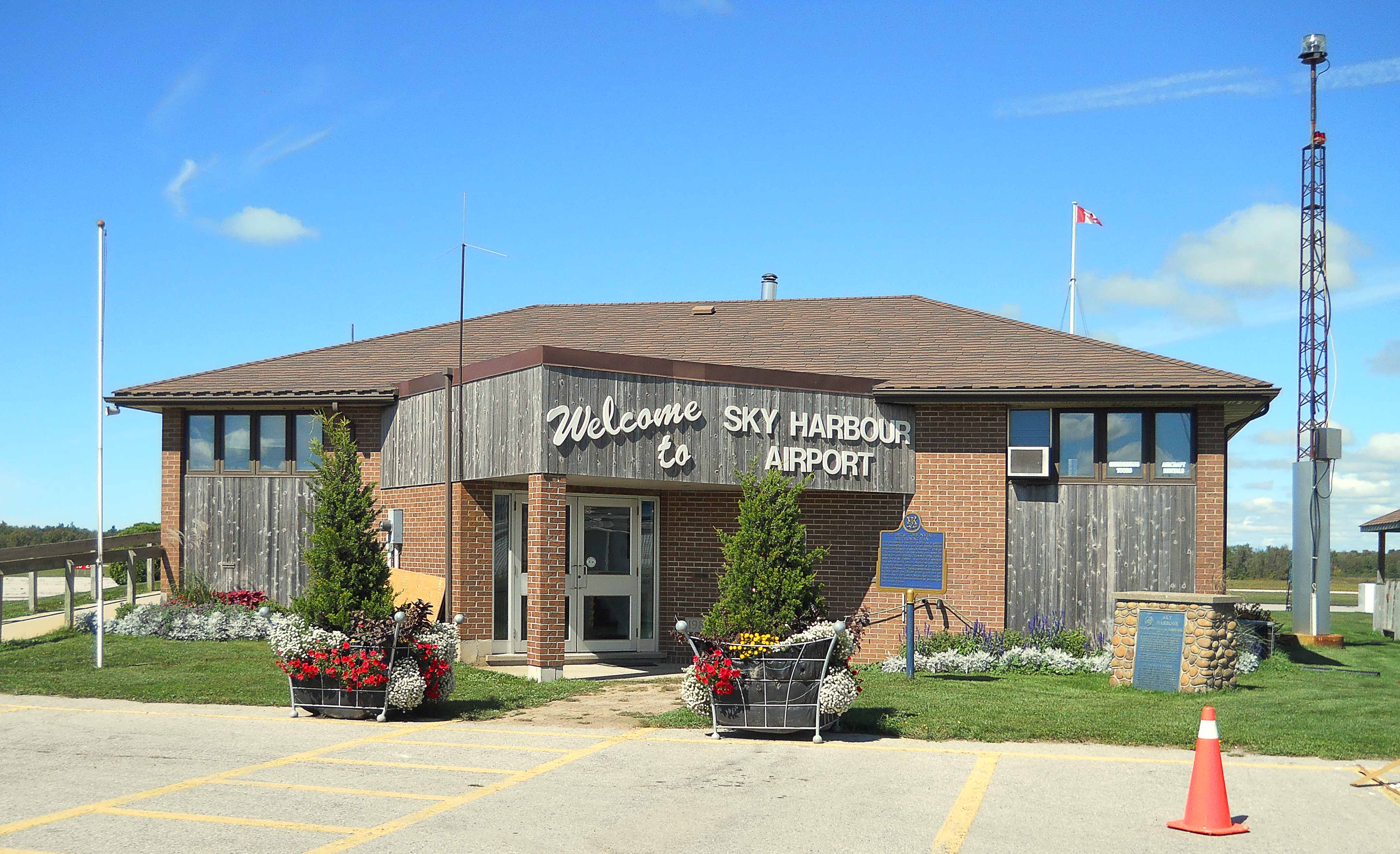
- Goderich Airport terminal
- IATA: none; ICAO: CYGD; WMO: 71261

Summary
- Airport type: Public
- Operator: Municipality of Goderich
- Location: Goderich, Ontario
- Opened: July 30, 1938
- Time zone: EST (UTC−05:00)
  - Summer (DST): EDT (UTC−04:00)
- Elevation AMSL: 709 ft / 216 m
- Coordinates: 43°46′04″N 081°42′39″W
- Website: goderichairport.ca

Map
- Location in Ontario CYGD (Canada)

Runways
Direction	Length		Surface
Direction	ft	m	Surface
05/23	1,871	570	Turf
10/28	3,002	915	Asphalt
14/32	5,034	1,534	Asphalt
- Source: Canada Flight Supplement; Environment and Climate Change Canada

Goderich Airport (ICAO: CYGD), also known as Goderich Municipal Airport and formerly Sky Harbour Airport, is a registered aerodrome located 1.5 nautical miles (2.8 km; 1.7 mi) north of Goderich, Ontario, Canada.

The airport is classified as an airport of entry by Nav Canada and is staffed by the Canada Border Services Agency on a call-out basis from the Region of Waterloo International Airport on weekdays and the John C. Munro Hamilton International Airport on weekends. CBSA officers at this airport currently can handle general aviation aircraft only, with no more than 15 passengers. The aerodrome is located close to Lake Huron and the Maitland River which allows the CBSA officers to handle seaplanes with up to 15 passengers.

== History ==
During World War II, Goderich Airport hosted No. 12 Elementary Flying Training School (EFTS) for the British Commonwealth Air Training Plan, providing initial pilot training for aircrews using the Fleet Finch. Like most of the other EFTS, this school was run by a civilian flying club, in this case, the school was operated by the Kitchener-Waterloo and the County of Huron Flying Clubs. No. 12 EFTS opened on October 14, 1940, and closed on July 14, 1944.

The Canadian Sport Parachuting Association (CSPA) notes on its 'History' page that in 1991, "The largest Canadian Freefall formation was established with a 44-way in Goderich, Ontario." As of June 2024, this is still the Canadian record.

=== Aerodrome information ===
In approximately 1942 the aerodrome was listed at 43°46′N 81°43′W with a Var. 6 degrees W and elevation of 700 feet (213 m). The runway data lists a "turf - all way field - 3200'."
