= Huron Historic Gaol =

Coordinates: 43.7499°N 81.7083°W

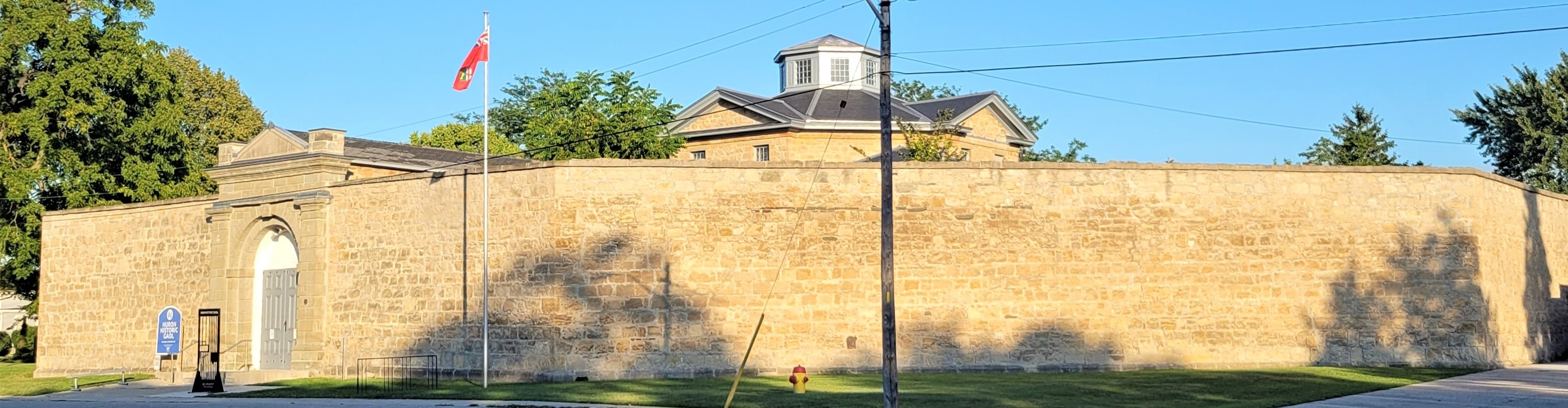
- Established: 1842
- Location: Goderich, Ontario, Canada
- Type: Prison museum
- Director: Meighan Wark
- Curator: Elizabeth French-Gibson
- Website: www.huroncounty.ca/museum

National Historic Site of Canada
- Designated: 1973

The Huron Historic Gaol was established as the Huron County Gaol for Upper Canada's Huron District. Clearing of the land began in Goderich, Ontario in 1839 and the jail was constructed between 1839 and 1842 using stone from the Maitland River Valley and from Michigan. The octagonal jail was designed by Toronto architect Thomas Young, modelled after Jeremy Bentham's Panopticon design for prison construction, common in mid-19th century Britain and North America.

A temporary courtroom and Council Chambers were set up on the jail’s third floor. It was in this makeshift Council Chamber that the first Huron District Council meeting was held on February 8, 1842. The third floor was also used for church services and other public gatherings before proper buildings were available. The building served the dual purpose of jail and courthouse until the construction of the county courthouse was completed in 1856, in the centre of Goderich’s Market Square.

The site ceased functioning as a jail serving Huron County in 1972 and inmates were then transferred to Walkerton and Stratford jails. It was designated a National Historic Site of Canada in 1973.

== Hangings ==
Three inmates were hanged at the jail, with two of the hangings conducted publicly. On December 18, 1861 William Mahone was hanged outside the jail walls. An exterior wall of the jail was the location of the last public execution that occurred in Canada, when on December 7, 1869, Nicholas Melady was hanged for the murder of his father and stepmother. Edward Jardine was hanged privately on June 16, 1911.

Steven Truscott awaited execution in the Huron County Gaol from September 30, 1959, when he was convicted at age 14 of the murder of Lynne Harper, until his sentence was commuted to life imprisonment on January 22, 1960. On August 28, 2007, Truscott was acquitted of the charges.

== Museum ==
The jail and adjoining early 20th century period governor's house opened to the public as a museum on Saturday June 29, 1974. The museum is open to the public from May to October and is owned and operated by the County of Huron. Admission is charged. The jail has been refurbished to its approximate state in Victorian times. There is a gift shop selling souvenirs of the jail and Huron County.

== Affiliations ==
The Museum is affiliated with: CMA, CHIN, and Virtual Museum of Canada.

== See also ==
- List of correctional facilities in Ontario

== Sources ==
- www.huroncounty.ca/museum
- Melady, John (2005). Double Trap: The Last Public Hanging In Canada. Dundern Press. ISBN 1-55002-571-6.
- Sher, Julian (2002). "Until You Are Dead": Steven Truscott's Long Ride Into History. Vintage Canada. ISBN 0-676-97381-7.
