= Sifto Canada =

Canadian salt company

Sifto Canada Corporation
- Type: subsidiary
- Industry: Salt Mining and marketing
- Founded: 1866
- Headquarters: Mississauga, Ontario, Canada
- Key people: Fran Malecha, CEO
- Products: salt
- Number of employees: 800
- Website: www.siftocanada.com

Sifto Canada, Sifto Salt, or simply Sifto Salt Canada is a salt mining and marketing company based in Canada, whose primary products are table salt, fine evaporated salt, water conditioning salt, agricultural salt, and highway deicing salt. Sifto Canada is wholly owned by Compass Minerals.

Sifto was founded by Sam Platt who was prospecting for oil in 1866, and instead of oil encountered rock salt in Goderich Harbour on Lake Huron. Sifto Canada was formed in 1950 and the company was acquired by the United States chemical company Compass Minerals in the 1990s. The Goderich mine developed into the largest salt mine in Canada and remains a key source of salt for the company.

== Facilities ==
In addition to distribution facilities across the country, Sifto Canada operates the following production facilities:

- Rock salt mine in Goderich, Ontario
- Mechanical evaporation plant in Unity, Saskatchewan (built in 1949 with a staff of 60)
- Mechanical evaporation plant in Goderich, Ontario
- Mechanical evaporation plant in Amherst, Nova Scotia

The Goderich salt mine has a production capacity of 9 million tons per year, and produces 7,250,000 tons per year, while the evaporation plants in Goderich, Unity, and Amherst have the capacity to produce a total of more than 470,000 tons. It is the largest underground salt mine in the world.

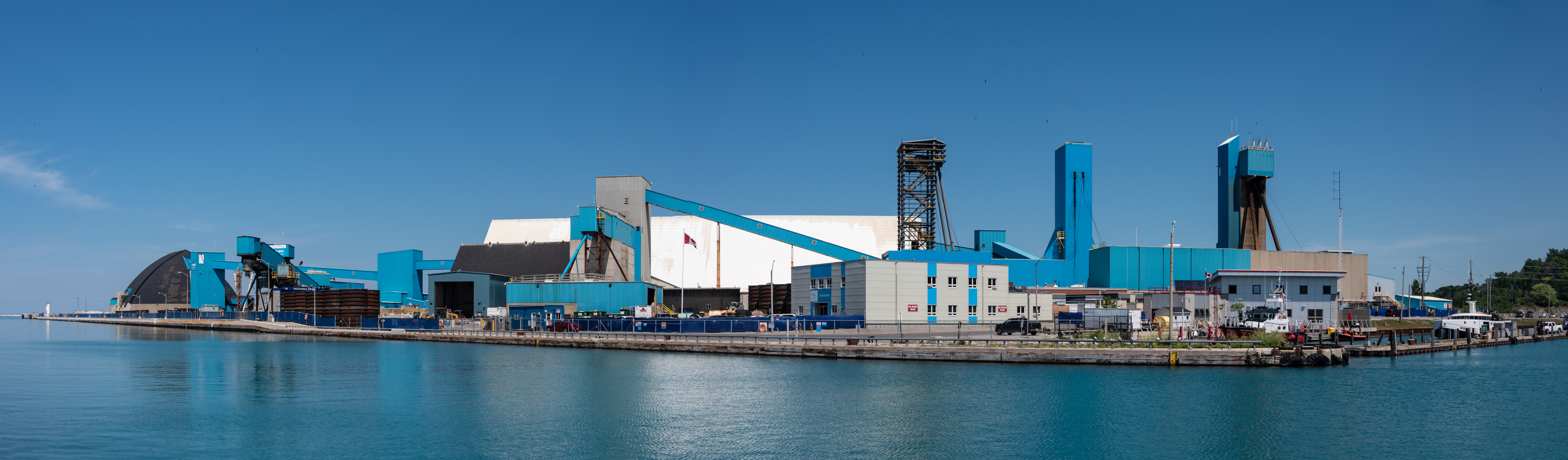
Sifto Salt Mine and processing plant in Goderich, Ontario, Canada

== See also ==
- Canadian Salt Company – maker of Windsor Salt, owned by Morton Salt of the United States
