= Compass Minerals =

Mineral company

Compass Minerals International, Inc.
- Company type: Public
- Traded as: NYSE: CMP
- Industry: Mining
- Founded: 1844; 2001 (reformed)
- Headquarters: Overland Park, Kansas, United States
- Key people: Edward Dowling (CEO)
- Products: salt, sulfate of potash
- Revenue: $US 1.49 billion
- Number of employees: 3,131
- Website: compassminerals.com

Compass Minerals International, Inc is an American public company that, through its subsidiaries, is a leading producer of minerals, including salt, magnesium chloride and sulfate of potash. Based in Overland Park, Kansas; the company provides bulk treated and untreated highway deicing salt to customers in North America and the United Kingdom and plant nutrition products to growers worldwide. Compass Minerals also produces consumer deicing and water conditioning products, consumer and commercial culinary salt, and other mineral-based products for consumer, agricultural and industrial applications. In addition, Compass Minerals provides records management services to businesses throughout the United Kingdom.

== Production methods and facilities ==
=== Underground salt mining ===
Underground salt mining produces rock salt using both drill-and-blast and continuous mining techniques in deep deposits. Compass Minerals is the largest rock salt producer in North America and the U.K. It operates underground salt mines at Goderich, Ontario, the largest salt mine in the world with an annual capacity of 9 million tons; Cote Blanche, Louisiana, with annual capacity of 3.4 million tons; and Winsford, Cheshire, United Kingdom, with annual capacity of 1.5 million tons.

=== Mechanical evaporation ===
Mechanical evaporation uses high-efficiency vacuum processes to produce high-purity, fine- and coarse-grained salt products for commercial, agricultural, and industrial applications. Compass Minerals is a leading producer of mechanically evaporated salt in North America. It operates mechanical evaporation salt facilities in Lyons, Kansas (annual capacity 450,000 tons), Unity, Saskatchewan (160,000 tons); Goderich, Ontario (130,000 tons); and Amherst, Nova Scotia (130,000 tons). Compass Minerals also operates an SOP evaporation facility at Wynyard, Saskatchewan, with annual capacity of 40,000 tons.

=== Solar evaporation ===
Solar evaporation is the oldest and most energy-efficient method of mineral production. At the Great Salt Lake near Ogden, Utah, Compass Minerals draws naturally occurring brine out of the lake into shallow ponds and allows solar evaporation to produce salt, sulfate of potash (SOP) and magnesium chloride. Its SOP plant at the Great Salt Lake is the largest in North America and one of only three SOP brine solar evaporation operations in the world. Annual capacity is 350,000 tons of SOP, 1.5 million tons of salt, and 750,000 tons of magnesium chloride. In 2022 Compass Minerals announced the intention to develop the capacity to extract over 11 kMT LCE (Lithium Carbonate Equivalent) yearly at the Great Salt Lake site. The project has since been put on pause due to regulatory changes.

== Business segments ==
Compass Minerals operates two business segments, Salt and Plant Nutrition.

Compass Minerals’ Salt Segment mines, produces, processes and distributes sodium chloride and magnesium chloride in North America and the U.K. The segment’s largest business is highway deicing, which primarily sells bulk rock salt to states, provinces, counties, municipalities and road maintenance contractors for ice control on public roadways. The highway deicing product line also includes flake and liquid magnesium chloride used for deicing and dust control; treated rock salt treated for deicing in very low temperatures; and rock salt for the chlor-alkali industry.

The salt segment also includes consumer and industrial product lines, which includes pure sodium chloride and blended products containing magnesium chloride, calcium chloride and potassium chloride for applications such as consumer and professional deicing, water conditioning, culinary salt, animal nutrition, swimming pool minerals, and industrial applications.

Compass Minerals’ Plant Nutrition Segment produces sulfate of potash fertilizer.

Compass Minerals’ domestic sales of SOP are concentrated in the Western and Southeastern U.S. and exports to Latin America, Japan, Australia, and New Zealand.

In 2021, Compass Minerals divested the last segment of their plant micronutrient assets in an agreement with Koch Agronomic Services.

== Ranks ==
Compass Minerals is the biggest:

- Salt producer in North America and the United Kingdom
- Sulfate of potash specialty fertilizer producer in the Western Hemisphere
- Magnesium chloride deicing/de-dusting producer in North America

In 2012, Compass Minerals had total sales of $942 million and ended the year with market capitalization of just $2.5 billion. The company is part of the S&P MidCap 400 Index, the Russell 1000 Index and was included in Fortune magazine’s 2010 listing of the “100 Fastest-Growing Companies.” Though the company’s history stretches back as far as 1844, Compass Minerals became a public company following its initial public offering in December 2003.

== See also ==
- List of S&P 400 companies
- Sifto Canada - Canadian subsidiary of Compass Minerals
