= Goderich, Ontario =

Town in Ontario, Canada

Goderich
- Town (lower-tier)
- Town of Goderich
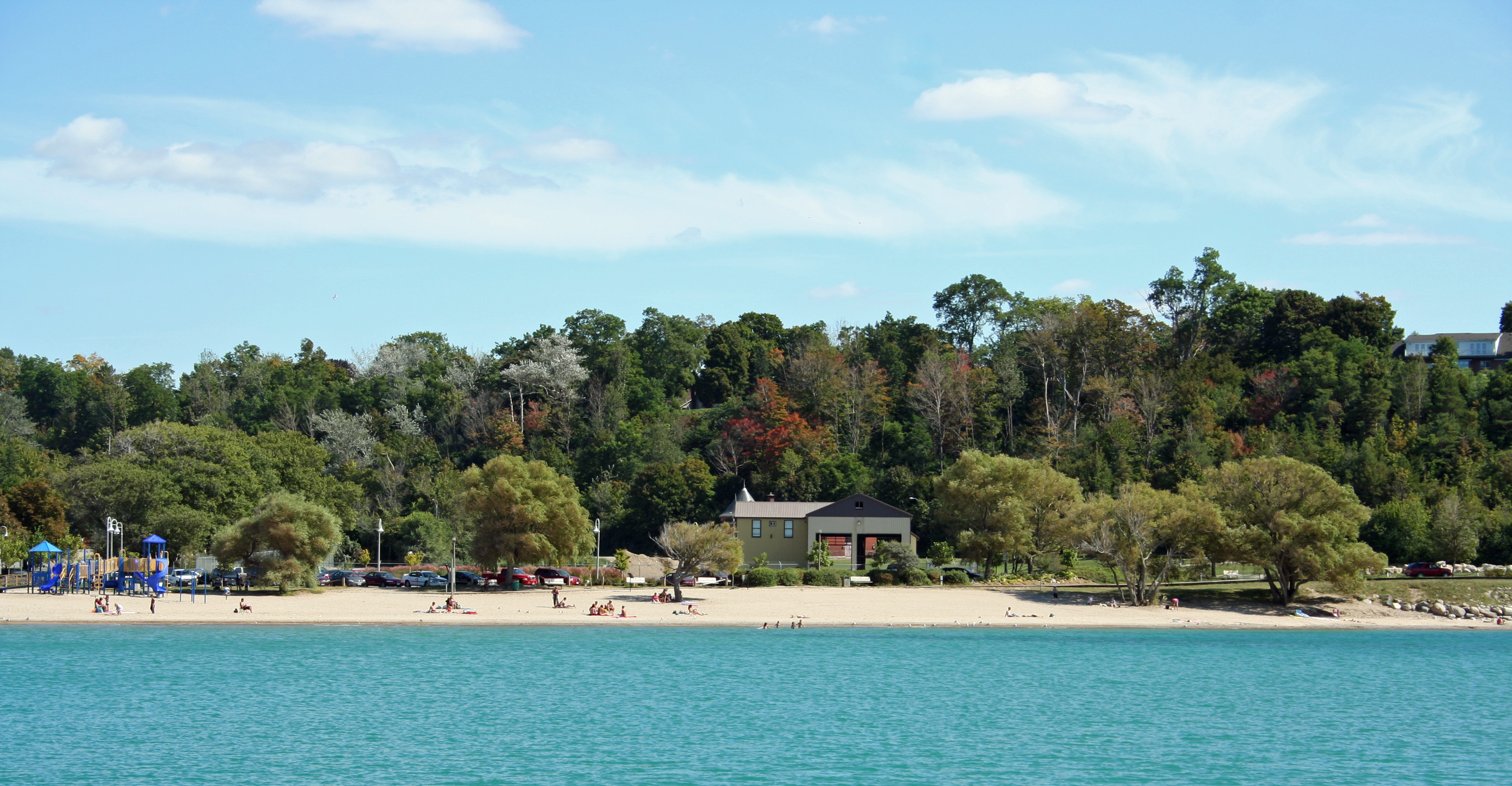
- Motto: Canada's Prettiest Town
- Location within Huron County Location within Southern Ontario
- Coordinates: 43°44′N 81°42′W
- Country: Canada
- Province: Ontario
- County: Huron
- Founded: 1827
- Incorporated: 1850

Government
  - Mayor: Trevor Bazinet
  - Deputy Mayor: Leah Noel
  - Fed. riding: Huron—Bruce
  - Prov. riding: Huron—Bruce

Area
  - Total: 8.54 km^{2} (3.30 sq mi)
- Elevation: 213 m (699 ft)

Population (2021)
  - Total: 7,881
  - Density: 923.1/km^{2} (2,391/sq mi)
- Time zone: UTC-5 (EST)
  - Summer (DST): UTC-4 (EDT)
- Postal code FSA: N7A
- Area codes: 519, 226
- Website: www.town.goderich.on.ca

Goderich (/ˈɡɒdrɪtʃ, ˈɡɒdərɪtʃ/ GOD-rich or GOD-ə-rich) is a town in the Canadian province of Ontario and is the county seat of Huron County. The town was founded by John Galt and William "Tiger" Dunlop of the Canada Company in 1827. First laid out in 1828, the town is named after Frederick John Robinson, 1st Viscount Goderich, who was prime minister of the United Kingdom at the time. It was incorporated as a town in 1850.

As of the Canada 2021 Census, the population is 7,881 in a land area of 8.54 square kilometres.

Located on the eastern shore of Lake Huron at the mouth of the Maitland River, Goderich faces the lake to the west and is notable for its sunsets. Some claim that Queen Elizabeth II once commented that Goderich was "the prettiest town in Canada" although no reigning monarch has ever visited Goderich. The town indicates that tourism is among its important industries. It has been named one of Ontario's best small towns by Comfort Life, a website for retirement living in Canada.

The town participates yearly in the Communities in Bloom competition; and has won awards in many categories. In 2012, Goderich was a National Finalist in the competition, and was also part of the Circle of excellence.

== History ==
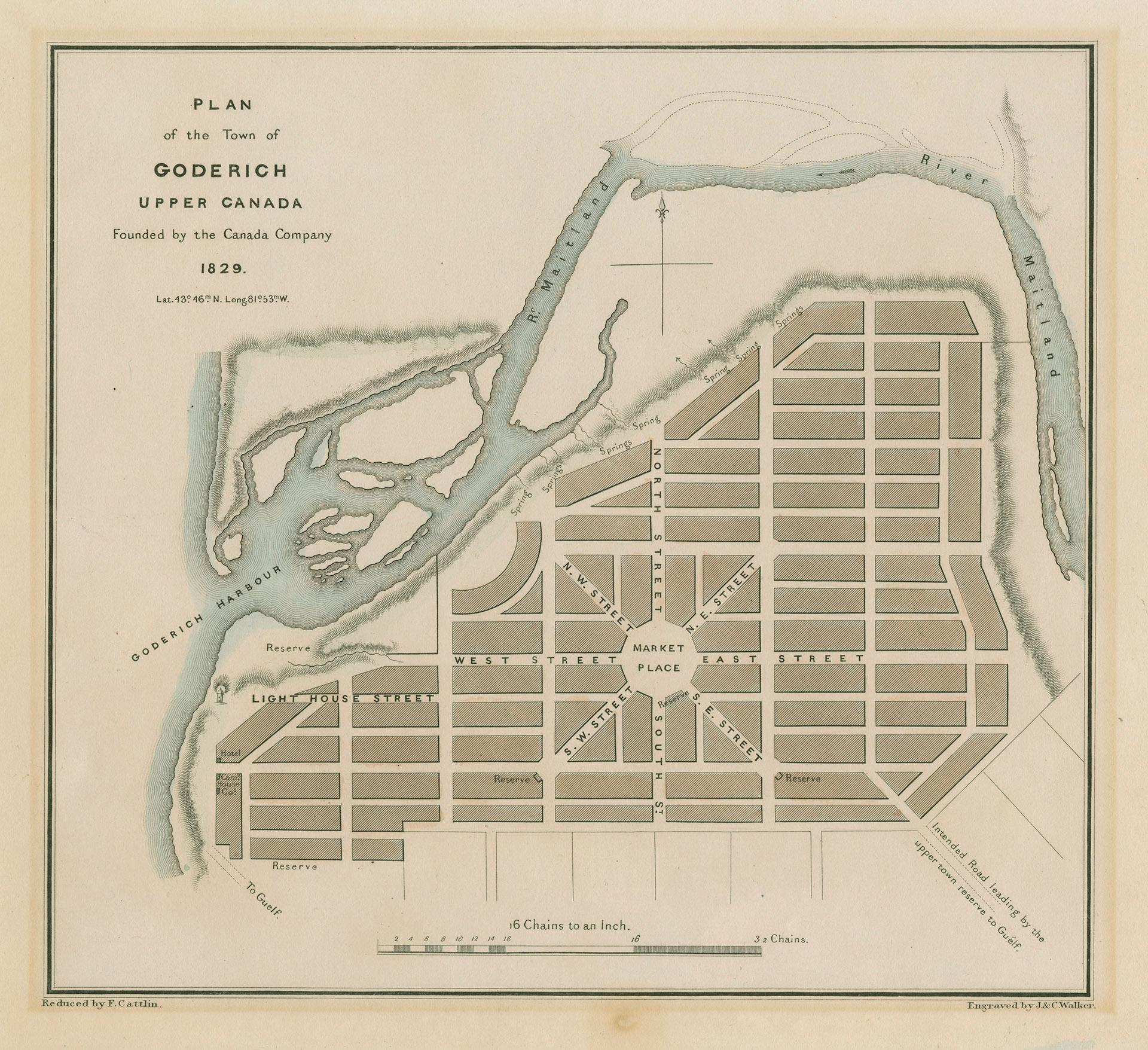
Plan of the town of Goderich, 1829

According to the historic plaques erected by the Province, the Canada Company acquired the vast amount of land called the Huron Tract in 1826 and in 1827, under Superintendent John Galt, established its base in what would become Goderich. Development was under way by 1829. In 1850, with a population of about 1,000, the community was incorporated as a town. In addition to Galt, another important individual was Dr. William "Tiger" Dunlop who was Warden of the Forests for the Canada Company, and helped develop the Huron Tract and later, to found Goderich. Also noteworthy, Thomas Mercer Jones administered much of the million acre Tract and built a richly furnished mansion, Park House, in Goderich in about 1839.

Town records indicate that the Huron Tract had been acquired by the government from the Chippewa First Nation and that the location of the community was based on coastal surveys completed in 1824 by Captain Bayfield. A log cabin was erected, at the top of the hill overlooking the harbour in 1827; this building, the home of Dr. William "Tiger" Dunlop, was later referred to as "The Castle".

An 1846 Gazette indicated that a harbour was operating, but the docks were not in a good state of repair. A light house was being erected. Roads were available to Wilmot Township, Ontario and to the town of London, Ontario. Shipbuilding was already underway. A fishing company had started but did not succeed and closed down. There were five churches in Goderich, four Protestant and one Roman Catholic. By 1869 the population was 4,500; a railway station and steamship docks were in operation. Wheat was the primary crop shipped from this area.

Research by the University of Waterloo indicates that the Canada Company built piers to protect ships in the harbour between 1830 and 1850 and in 1872 the first modern harbour was created. The railway arrived in June 1858 and a grain elevator was erected in 1859. Harbour Hill was graded in 1850. Fishing became an important part of the community, and the pier was lined with fish shanties. A modern rail station was built near the harbour and the building still stands today. Goderich became a very busy rail shipping location by the 1940s and had a roadhouse and turntable until the 1960s. Salt mining, which eventually became a major industry, was started in 1866 when Samuel Platt began opening salt mines beside his flour mill on the Maitland River. The harbour at Goderich was also the home of large flour mills starting in the 1870s.

The Smith's Canadian Gazetteer of 1846 describes Goderich as follows:

It was laid out in 1827 by Mr. Galt ... the town is rather exposed to north and north west winds from the lake, in consequence of which the weather is occasionally wintry, even in the middle of summer ... Owing to its remote situation ... Goderich has not increased as fast as many other places of the same age. A harbour has been constructed but the piers are now getting out of repair. This is the only harbour between Port Sarnia and the Saugeen Islands. A light house is just about being erected .... A steamboat and several schooners have been built here. Stages run twice a week from Goderich to London and Galt, and during the last season the steamboat Goderich called here on her weekly trips ... A fishing company was established here, some years since, but from some mismanagement did not succeed very-well, and is now broken up. Goderich contains five churches and chapels, ... there is also a stone jail and court house, and the Canada Company's offices... Post Office, post four times a week. Population, 659."

The Goderich lighthouse, the first on the Canadian side of Lake Huron, opened in 1847 with a tower and the keeper's house. After the 1913 storm it was remodelled. A severe storm on Lake Huron in November 1913 caused the loss of 19 ships and 244 lives. A great deal of wreckage floated to the Goderich area shore. The bodies of the sailors were identified and collected by a Lake Carriers' Association committee based at Goderich.

In 1866, four artesian wells began providing the town's water and also attracted tourists who had heard about the water's medicinal properties. The Ocean House Hotel, built in the 1850s, housed many tourists. From about 1910, the sandy beach near town were also used heavily by locals and by visitors who appreciated the shallow, warm water. In 1930, a "bathing house" was built with lockers, restrooms and a small store.

Early in World War II, what is now the Goderich Airport became the site of one of Canada's air training facilities; it opened in December 1939, at Sky Harbour. The school operated until March 1945. A Lancaster X airplane, FM 213, was donated in the 1960s by Branch 109 Royal Canadian Legion in honour of those who died or went missing during the war.

Goderich has many historically designated buildings, listed on a map published by the Town.

In 2018, a strike involving over 350 salt mine workers broke out in Goderich, following labour disputes between the Unifor Local 16-0 union and the American-owned company Compass Minerals, which owns the mine, over a new contract. The strike ended in July 2018 having lasted for 12 weeks.

On August 9, 2022, the at-the-time Mayor, John Grace, died in a boating accident in Northwestern Ontario. The Deputy Mayor, Myles Murdock, took over as the acting Mayor for the remainder of the 2022 term of council. Myles Murdock was elected as the Mayor of Goderich for the 2022-2026 term of council during the 2022 Ontario Municipal Election.

=== The Square ===
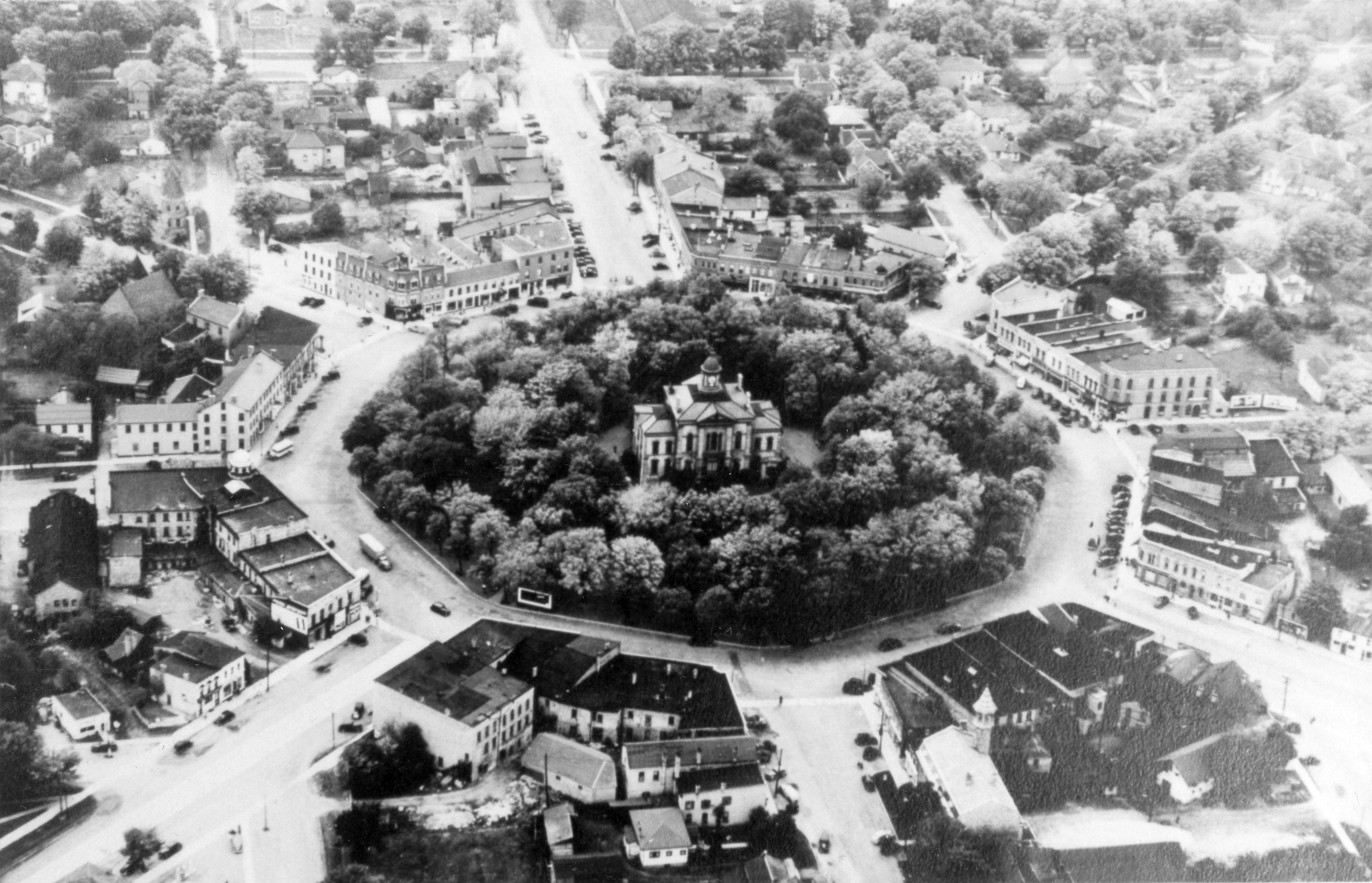
The Square, 1941

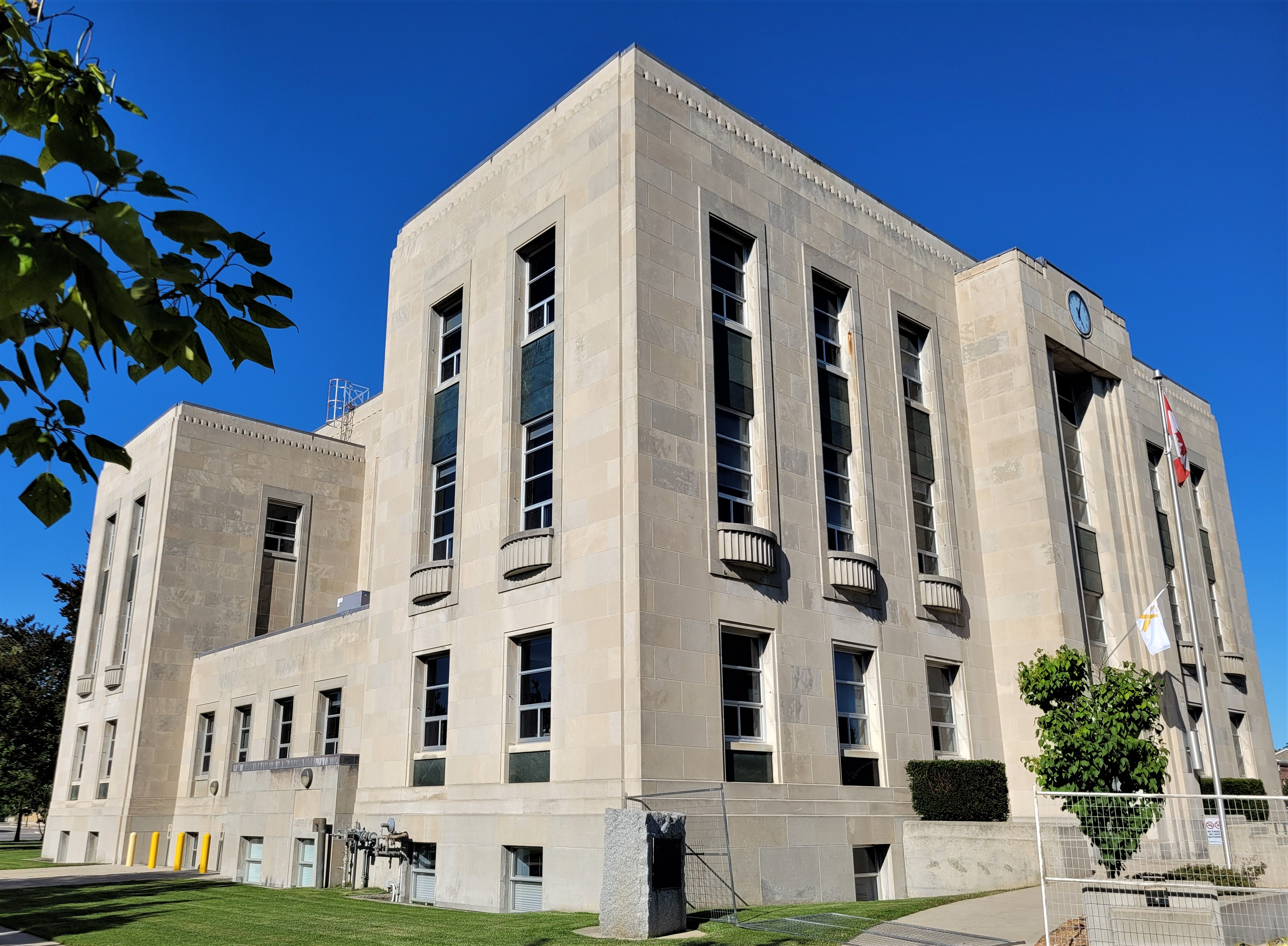
The County Courthouse

Goderich's downtown has an octagonal roundabout known as 'The Square'. The county courthouse stands in the middle of The Square. This is where, in 1959, Steven Truscott was convicted of murdering Lynne Harper. The conviction was overturned in 2007.

The Square was formally listed in the Register of Historic Places by the Government of Canada in May 2007. The Town had already recognized the value of the area in 1982, under the Ontario Heritage Act.

The Square was designed and developed between 1840 and the mid 1890s and in its early days, contained the main office of the Canada Company which helped to develop much of the county. The design of the square — a "radial composition" — is attributed to John Galt of the Company, inspired by ancient Roman city plans. Over the years it was called "Market Square", "The Square" or "Courthouse Square" by locals. The original courthouse was located here but was destroyed in a fire and replaced by a modern structure in the 1950s.

Contrary to a popularly held belief, plans for The Square were not intended for Guelph. It is thought this rumour started when Goderich was founded, as town planners the Canada Company originally wanted their community to be called Guelph after the Royal Family; the Company eventually resigned to accepting the decisions of Superintendent John Galt to keep the name Goderich.

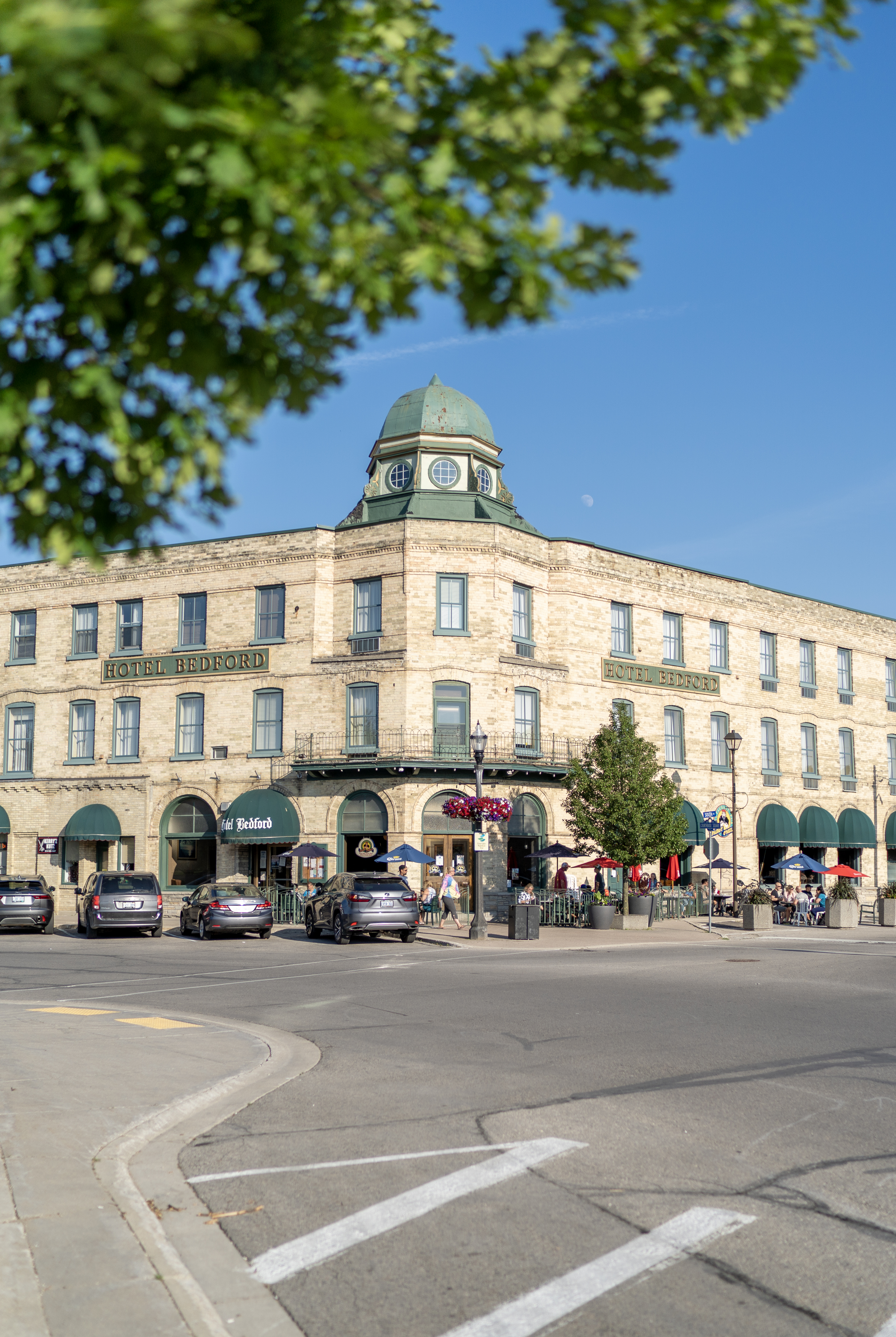
Hotel Bedford at Goderich downtown.

==== 2011 tornado ====
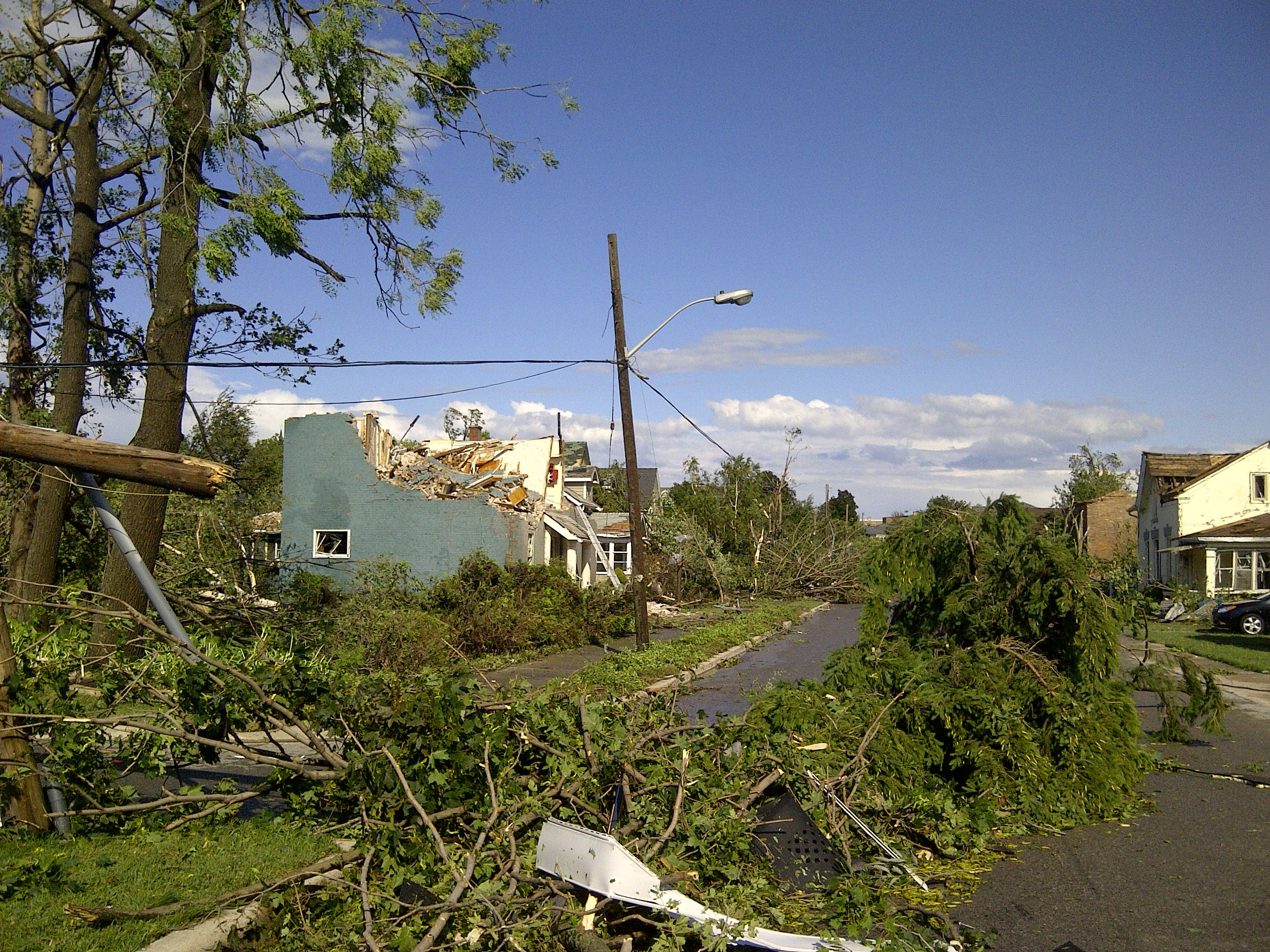
Felled trees and demolished buildings along a road in Goderich after the tornado.

On the afternoon of 21 August 2011, an F3 tornado touched down in the area, after coming ashore as a waterspout, with the mesocyclone thunderstorm cell moving across Lake Huron. It was the strongest tornado that had hit Ontario since the Arthur, Ontario tornado of April 20, 1996, though on average, F3 tornadoes occur in Ontario every eight years. The devastating storm downed power lines, tore roofs from houses, and left cars and trees scattered along city streets. Hundred-year-old trees surrounding the Goderich Courthouse were uprooted in seconds. The tornado killed one person: Norman Laberge, 61, of Lucknow, who was working on a dock associated with a salt mine on the coast of Lake Huron when the storm hit. 37 people were injured. The Environment Canada weather forecast office in Toronto issued a tornado warning for Goderich and southern Huron County 12 minutes before the tornado struck. The town did not have a tornado siren unlike some other Ontario cities.

News reports later indicated that one hundred houses, 25 buildings and thousands of 150-plus-year-old trees were seriously damaged or destroyed.

==== Rebuilding The Square area ====
After the tornado, the roofs of several buildings around the square had been destroyed, and the trees in the green space around the courthouse had been damaged or uprooted.

A year later, 152 of the 170 downtown businesses had reopened but reconstruction of the courthouse, some historic buildings and the trees in the area took much longer.

By 2015, the park had re-opened with a new band shell. New trees, greenery, a statue and a water feature had been installed in front of the court house. Much of the area around the park had been reconstructed including commercial building on Kingston Street and The Square. The last work to be completed was the Kingston block of commercial buildings on Kingston Street and The Square. Although the farmers' market and flea market had closed before the tornado, it re-opened.

== Climate ==
Climate data for Goderich, Ontario (Goderich Airport) 1991–2020, extremes 1866–present (Note: Long term records have been recorded at various climate stations in or nearby Goderich since 1866)
Month	Jan	Feb	Mar	Apr	May	Jun	Jul	Aug	Sep	Oct	Nov	Dec	Year
Record high °C (°F)	17.2 (63.0)	18.5 (65.3)	25.1 (77.2)	28.9 (84.0)	32.0 (89.6)	35.0 (95.0)	37.2 (99.0)	37.2 (99.0)	35.0 (95.0)	28.9 (84.0)	23.1 (73.6)	16.7 (62.1)	37.2 (99.0)
Mean daily maximum °C (°F)	−1.3 (29.7)	−0.6 (30.9)	3.8 (38.8)	10.6 (51.1)	17.4 (63.3)	22.4 (72.3)	24.4 (75.9)	24.0 (75.2)	21.0 (69.8)	14.3 (57.7)	7.3 (45.1)	1.7 (35.1)	12.1 (53.8)
Daily mean °C (°F)	−4.6 (23.7)	−4.3 (24.3)	−0.3 (31.5)	5.9 (42.6)	12.3 (54.1)	17.4 (63.3)	19.6 (67.3)	19.3 (66.7)	16.1 (61.0)	10.2 (50.4)	4.1 (39.4)	−1.1 (30.0)	7.9 (46.2)
Mean daily minimum °C (°F)	−7.8 (18.0)	−8 (18)	−4.4 (24.1)	1.1 (34.0)	7.1 (44.8)	12.4 (54.3)	14.8 (58.6)	14.5 (58.1)	11.2 (52.2)	6.0 (42.8)	0.8 (33.4)	−3.9 (25.0)	3.7 (38.7)
Record low °C (°F)	−29.4 (−20.9)	−32.8 (−27.0)	−26.1 (−15.0)	−17.8 (0.0)	−7.8 (18.0)	−5.0 (23.0)	1.1 (34.0)	1.1 (34.0)	−3.9 (25.0)	−11.1 (12.0)	−24.4 (−11.9)	−27.8 (−18.0)	−32.8 (−27.0)
Average precipitation mm (inches)	72.2 (2.84)	54.9 (2.16)	74.1 (2.92)	77.4 (3.05)	65.2 (2.57)	76.4 (3.01)	65.1 (2.56)	80.9 (3.19)	90.7 (3.57)	80.0 (3.15)	87.4 (3.44)	101.4 (3.99)	925.7 (36.44)
Average rainfall mm (inches)	17.9 (0.70)	20.8 (0.82)	36.6 (1.44)	67.1 (2.64)	64.8 (2.55)	76.4 (3.01)	65.1 (2.56)	80.9 (3.19)	90.7 (3.57)	74.5 (2.93)	61.9 (2.44)	41.3 (1.63)	698.0 (27.48)
Average snowfall cm (inches)	65.4 (25.7)	48.6 (19.1)	41.1 (16.2)	11.8 (4.6)	0.2 (0.1)	0.0 (0.0)	0.0 (0.0)	0.0 (0.0)	0.0 (0.0)	9.2 (3.6)	28.6 (11.3)	72.3 (28.5)	277.2 (109.1)
Average precipitation days (≥ 0.2 mm)	19	15	16	13	12	11	10	10	12	13	17	20	168
Average rainy days (≥ 0.2 mm)	5	4	7	11	11	11	10	10	12	12	11	8	112
Average snowy days (≥ 0.2 cm)	17	14	11	5	0	0	0	0	0	4	8	16	75
Source: Environment Canada (precipitation/rainfall/snowfall 1951–1980)

== Demographics ==
In the 2021 Census of Population conducted by Statistics Canada, Goderich had a population of 7,881 living in 3,667 of its 3,899 total private dwellings, a change of 3.3% from its 2016 population of 7,628. With a land area of 8.54 km^{2} (3.30 sq mi), it had a population density of 922.8/km^{2} (2,390.1/sq mi) in 2021.

Historical populations

Year	Pop.	±%
1841	659	—
1871	3,954	+500.0%
1881	4,564	+15.4%
1891	3,839	−15.9%
1901	4,158	+8.3%
1911	4,522	+8.8%
1921	4,107	−9.2%

Year	Pop.	±%
1931	4,491	+9.3%
1941	4,557	+1.5%
1951	4,934	+8.3%
1961	6,411	+29.9%
1971	6,813	+6.3%
1981	7,322	+7.5%
1991	7,452	+1.8%

Year	Pop.	±%
2001	7,604	+2.0%
2006	7,563	−0.5%
2011	7,521	−0.6%
2016	7,628	+1.4%
2021	7,881	+3.3%

Source: Statistics Canada

Demographics
	0-9	10-19	20-29	30-39	40-49	50-59	60-69	70-79	80+	Total	% of population
Male	400	445	365	385	500	595	360	305	195	3,555	47
Female	335	485	405	375	585	630	435	400	360	4,010	53
Total	735	930	770	765	1,085	1,220	795	710	550	7,565	100
Source: Stats Canada

== Economy ==
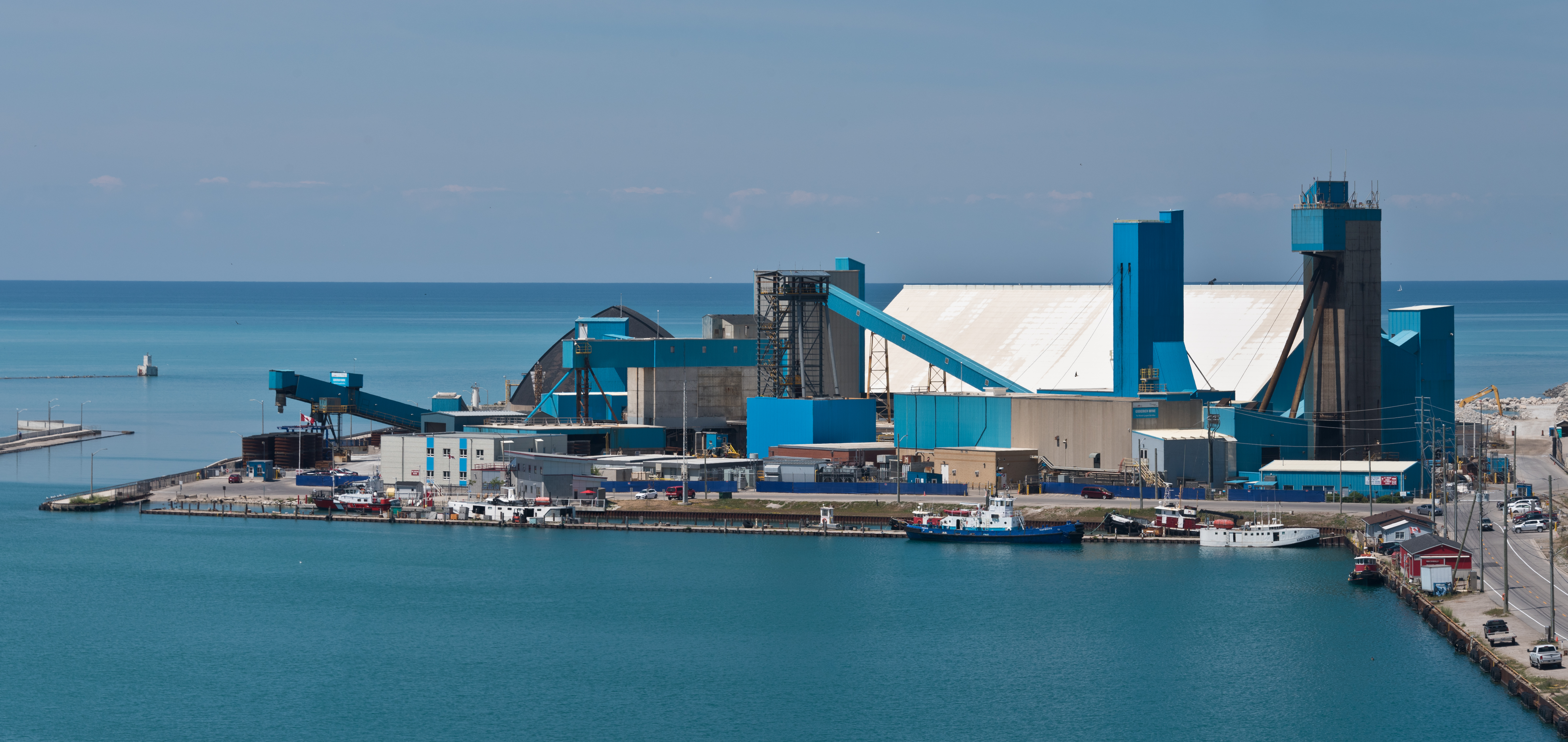
Salt mining is an important economic activity in Goderich.

Goderich is in Huron County which is primarily agricultural. In fact, the Official Plan indicates that "Huron leads all counties and regions in Ontario in total value of production; and it also exceeds the production totals of several provinces." However, the town does have some manufacturing with companies such as Compass Minerals and Vestas.

The salt mining industry in Goderich is one of the oldest in Ontario. In 1866, petroleum exploration crews found a massive ancient salt deposit about 300 metres (980 feet) under the surface.

To date, 150 million tons of salt has been produced from the mine and by 2012, after recent investments, it will be able to produce 9 million tons a year. This all started in 1866 when prospector Sam Platt was searching for oil and instead discovered rock salt 300 metres beneath Goderich Harbour. Just over 50 years ago harvesting of the salt began, and continues today by Sifto Canada. The mine is 530 metres (1,750 feet) below surface, extending 7 km^{2} (2.7 sq mi) under Lake Huron — roughly the size of the town. It is the largest underground salt mine in the world.

The salt deposits at Goderich are from an ancient sea bed of Silurian age, part of the Salina Formation. The halite rock salt is also found in Windsor, Ontario, both located on the eastern periphery of the Michigan Basin, on the southeastern shores of Lake Huron.

The town currently lists Canadian Salt Co./ Windsor Salt Warehouse and the Compass Minerals Evaporator and its Goderich Mine as businesses involved in this industry.

Volvo once operated a road grader manufacturing plant in Goderich. The plant, originally operated by locally owned Champion Road Machinery, was one of the world's oldest manufacturers of road equipment. It was acquired by Volvo in 1997. In September 2008, Volvo announced plans to close all operations in Goderich and move operations to Shippensburg, Pennsylvania. Production in Goderich ceased in 2009.

=== Tourism ===
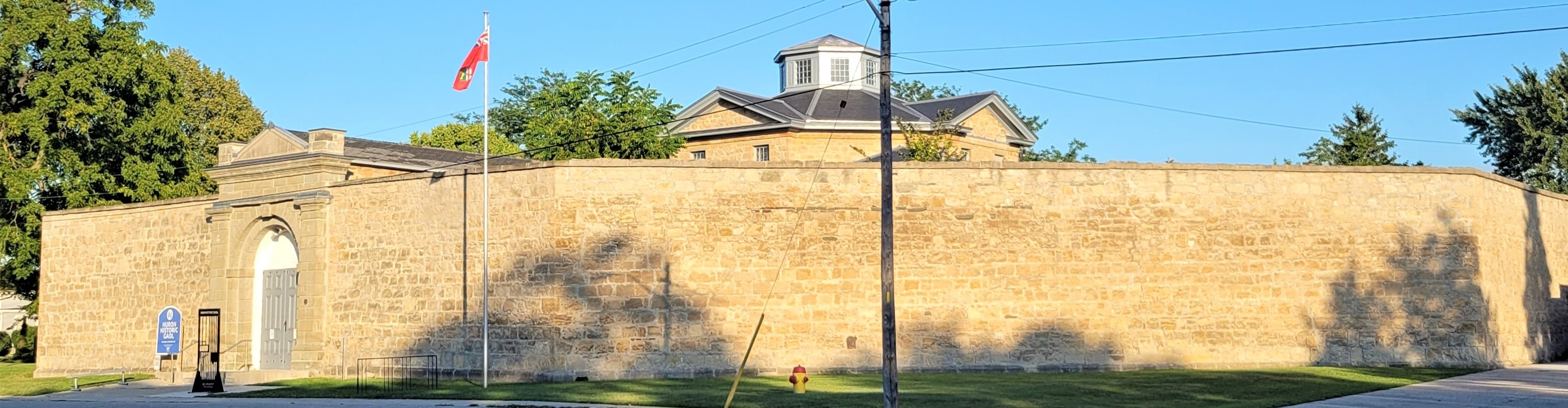
Huron Historic Gaol

Tourism is also significant because many visitors spend time on the Lake Huron shore, including three beaches near Goderich, and may shop or stay overnight in town. Goderich has festivals and events each year that appeal to some visitors as well as local attractions.

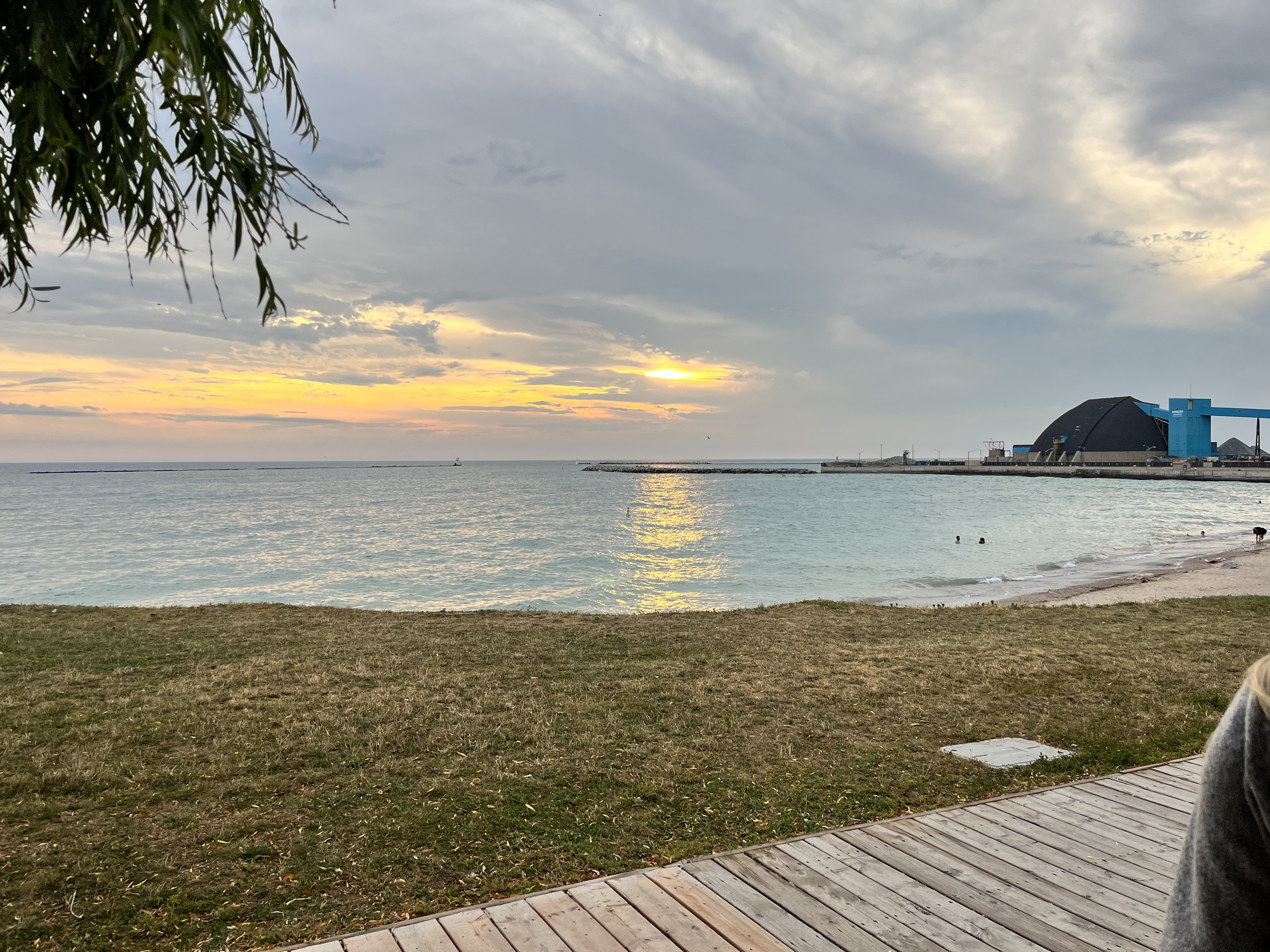
Main Beach Waterfront in Goderich, Ontario

The Huron Historic Gaol is a National Historic Site of Canada. It served as the region's gaol (old English form of jail) from its opening in 1842 until 1972. It is open to the public between April and October. This is the site of the last public hanging in Canada. James Donnelly Sr. of the Black Donnellys also spent time here before his trial. As well, Steven Truscott was held here for some time.

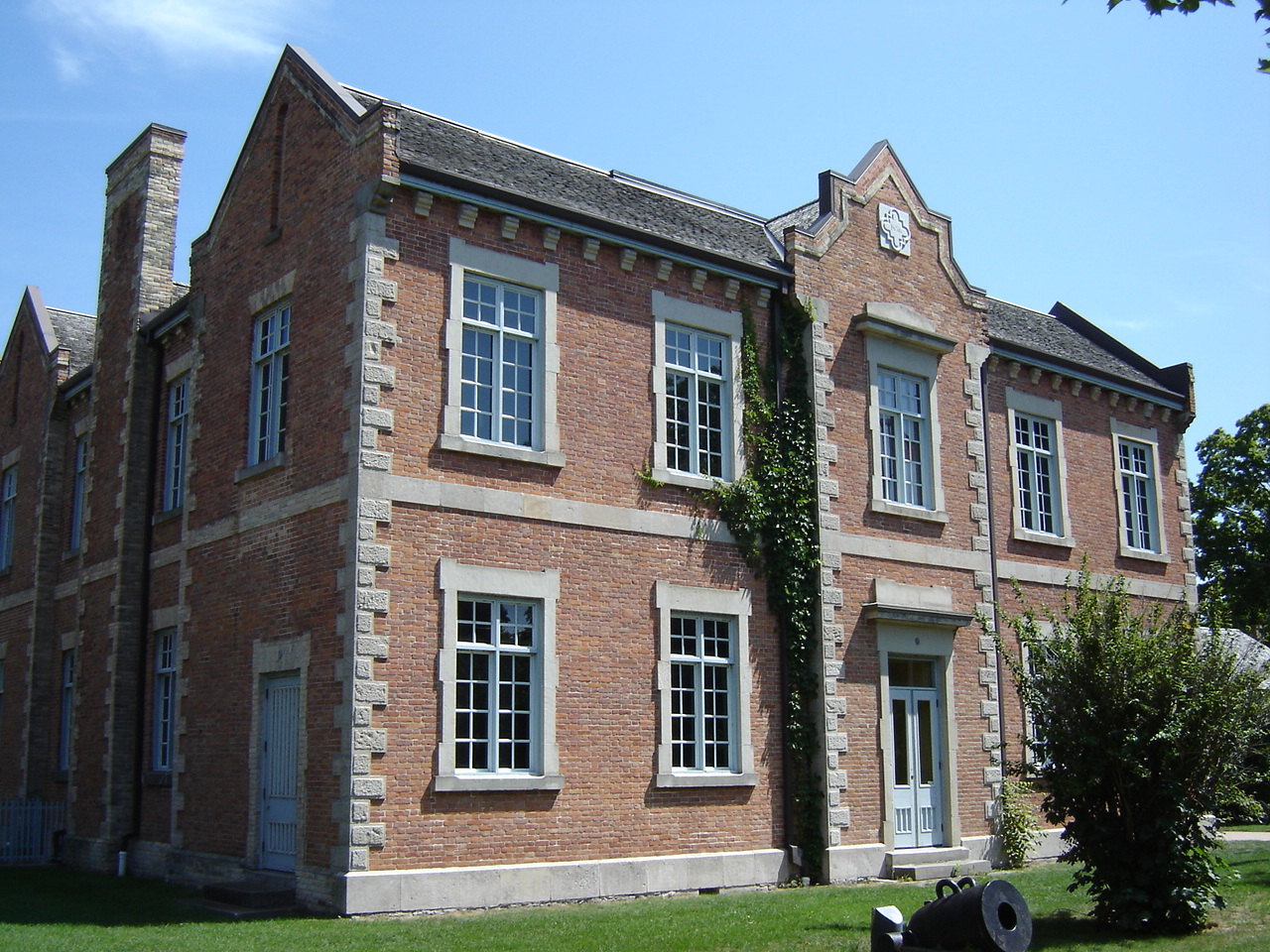
Huron County Museum

The Huron County Museum is a community museum which offers modern exhibition galleries. Permanent exhibits depict the early settlement and development of Huron County, including a full-size locomotive, a World War II Sherman tank, an extensive military collection, and an exhibit related to salt mining in the area. The museum also collects and maintains the Huron County Archives.

Goderich features three public-use beaches which can be reached by car following signage in town to the beach hill, also known as West Street. After parking, beach users can also walk along a wooden boardwalk over a mile in length (in late 2019, the boardwalk was damaged by strong waves, and it has been under repairs through 2020). The main beach, at the north end of the walkway is a sand and fine gravel beach where swimmers and sunbathers can watch lake freighters loading up with salt on the other side of the pier. Further south is St. Christopher's beach and at the far end of the boardwalk is "Rotary Cove", a family-friendly sand beach with lifeguards and playground equipment. Of interest as well, are the man-made groynes along the beach, put in place to control sand migration from the action of water currents.

Aside from annual festivals and events, Goderich hosts occasional special events, such as during Goderich's 150 year celebration — Jubilee 3 — there was a Skydiving Jamboree at the Goderich Airport. This event attracted hundreds of parachutists from all over the United States and Canada.

== Arts and culture ==
=== Flag ===
Goderich has its own official flag, which was adopted in 1977 for the town's 150th birthday celebration. A contest was held, open to all Goderich schools and residents. It was won by Goderich resident Judge Carter from St. Vincent St. The flag shows the royal crown centred in an octagon (representing the 1/4 mile octagonal 3-lane town square) with 3 waves at the bottom on a blue background representing Lake Huron and the Port of Goderich. The Town also has a full town crest.

== Sports ==
The town formerly had a Jr. C team called the Goderich Flyers. The team, as of 2026, has moved to the nearby town of Clinton, becoming the Clinton Radars.

== Government ==
The Goderich municipal council includes a Mayor, Deputy Mayor and five Councillors. The Mayor and the Deputy Mayor are also members of the County Council.

The Huron County Council consists of fifteen members from the nine area municipalities. Each is represented on this Council. Each year, a Warden is elected from the group and chairs meetings and represents the County at various functions. In 2024, Jamie Heffer was elected Warden for the 2025-2026 term. He is also Mayor of the Municipality of Morris-Turnberry.

== Infrastructure ==
=== Ports ===
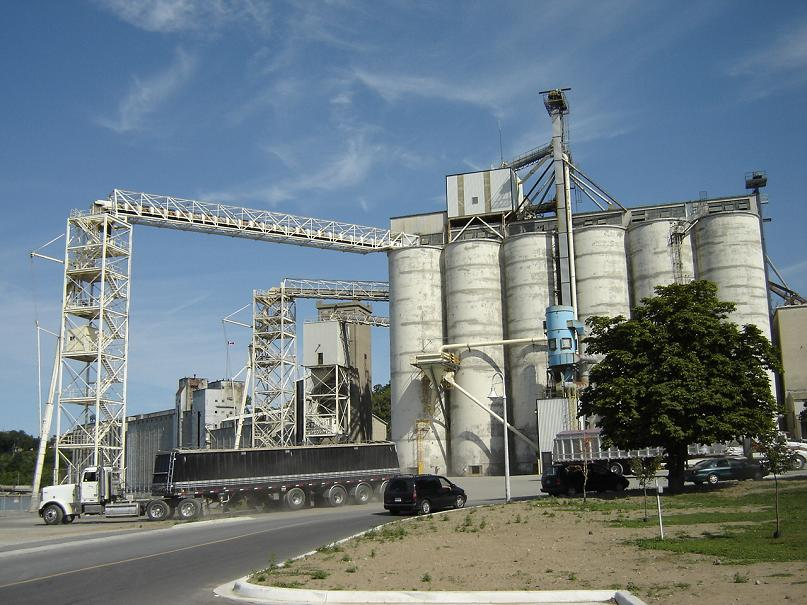
Silos at Goderich Harbour

Goderich Airport (known unofficially as Sky Harbour Airport) is a community airport with three runways: two are paved, with runway lighting, and one is grass. It is located directly north of the town, and is accessible via the Bluewater Highway north of the community. During WWII, The airport was the site of an Elementary Flying Training School as part of the British Commonwealth Air Training Plan. In addition to flight services, several industries are located in the immediate area of the airport to provide the full range of services that aviation requires, including interior and exterior re-finishing, and mechanical repairs.

Goderich Harbour is owned by the town, but is operated under contract by Goderich Port Management Corporation. It is an industrial harbour, used primarily to load salt from the Sifto salt mines onto lake and ocean freighters.

Snug Harbour is a marina located within the industrial harbour basin; Maitland Valley Marina is also located near Goderich.

=== Railways ===
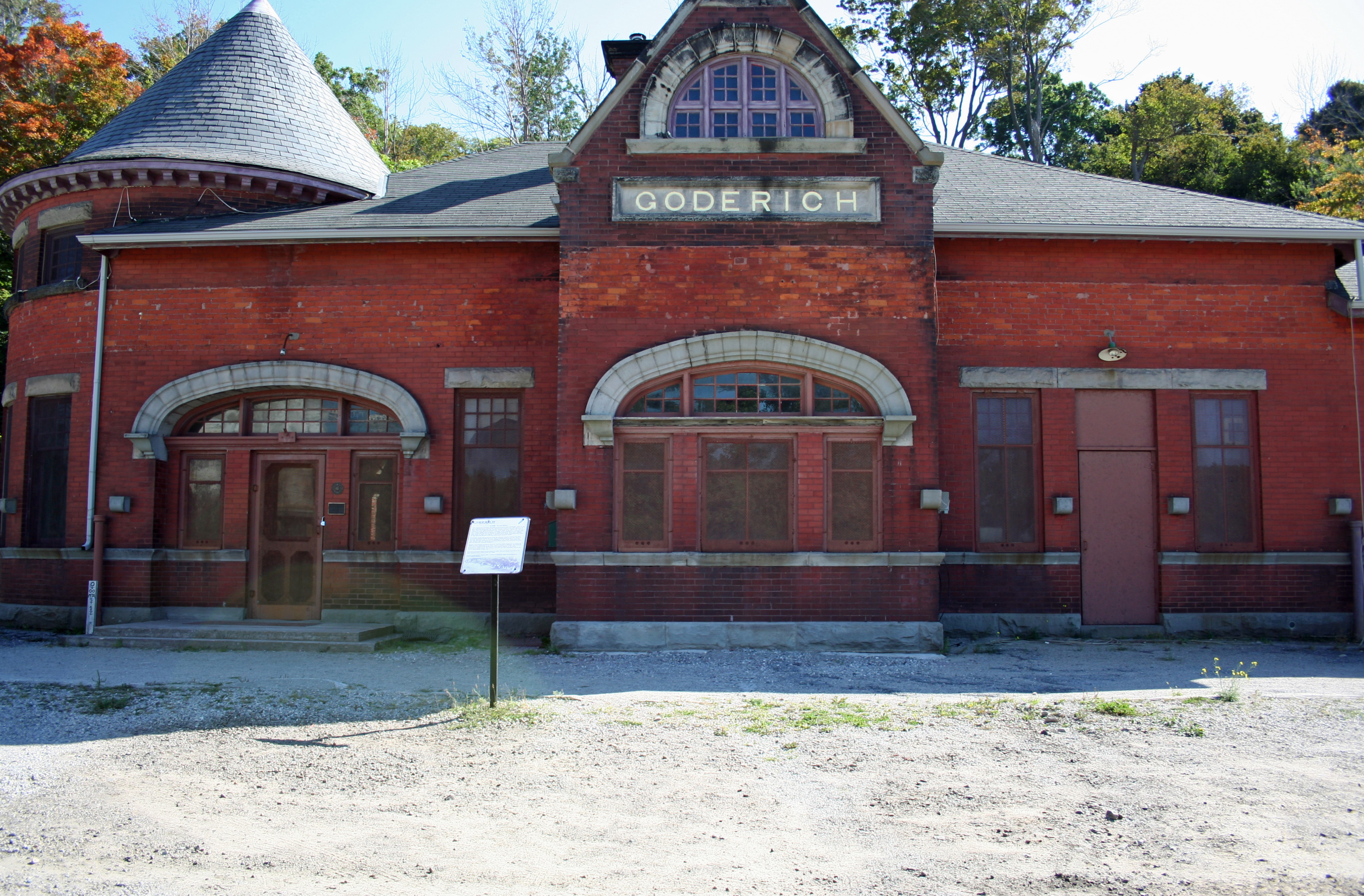
CPR station

The Goderich-Exeter Railway currently operates freight service to Goderich. The line was built by the Buffalo and Lake Huron Railway in 1859. The railway was soon taken over by the Grand Trunk Railway, later CN. In 1992, the line was sold to the GEXR.

The Canadian Pacific Railway built its own line, the Guelph and Goderich Railway, into Goderich in 1907. Passenger service ran until the 1960s. The entire line was abandoned in 1989. The railway was converted into the Goderich to Guelph Rail Trail in 2013, which includes the Goderich to Auburn Rail Trail. The trestle crossing over the Maitland River was converted through public fund-raising into a public walkway, offering views of the harbour, Maitland Valley golf course and the river valley itself. The Ontario West Shore Railway started to build a railway from Goderich to Kincardine in 1909, but it was never completely opened.

== Education ==
Public education in Goderich is managed by the Avon Maitland District School Board, with Goderich District Collegiate Institute (GDCI) and Goderich Public School (grades from junior Kindergarten to grade 6) in the town. GDCI was founded in 1841, and stood at the corner of Waterloo St. and Britannia Road, until the present building was completed. Goderich Public School is an amalgamation of Victoria Public School and Robertson Memorial Public School.

Catholic schools are managed by the Huron-Perth Catholic District School Board, which has St. Mary's Catholic School in town. The nearest Catholic high school is located in Clinton.

== Media ==
=== Newspaper ===
- The local newspapers are the Goderich Signal Star, owned by Quebecor/Sun Media Corporation through Bowes Publishers and the Goderich Sun, owned and published by Grant Haven Media.

=== Radio stations ===
==== FM ====
- CIYN-FM-1 99.7 "Oldies" - classic hits
- CHWC-FM 104.9 "Today's Best Country" - local news and country music
- CKNX-FM 101.7 "The One" - local, regional and national news and adult contemporary music
- CIBU-FM 94.5/91.7 "Cool 94.5" - local, regional and national news and classic rock music

== Notable people ==
- Albert Dewsbury (1926–2006) former NHL defenceman
- Gary Doak (1946-2017) former NHL defenceman
- William "Tiger" Dunlop (1792–1846) Founding father of Goderich associated with Canada Company
- Brock Dykxhoorn (born 1994) Professional baseball player, inducted into the Canadian Baseball Hall of Fame as a member of the 2015 Pan American Games gold medal winning baseball team
- Brenda Elliott (born 1950) Former Ontario cabinet minister
- Larry Jeffrey (1940 - 2022) former NHL forward, won the Stanley Cup in 1967 with the Toronto Maple Leafs
- C. E. McIntosh member of the Wisconsin State Assembly
- Ted Nasmith fantasy illustrator, best known for his illustrations of the works of J. R. R. Tolkien
- Jack Price (1932–2011) former NHL defenceman
- Jennifer Robinson (born 1976) former six-time Canadian national figure skating champion
- Tim Sale (born 1942), retired cabinet Minister in the province of Manitoba, Canada
- Dick Treleaven (born 1934) Ontario politician
- Steven Truscott, wrongfully convicted of murder in 1959 and sentenced to hang but sentence was commuted to life in prison. Released in 1969.
- Ron Van Horne (1932–2017) Ontario politician

== See also ==
- Kingsbridge Wind Farm
- List of shipwrecks of the 1913 Great Lakes storm
- List of towns in Ontario
- List of population centres in Ontario
