= John Melady =

Canadian writer

John Melady is a Canadian non-fiction author from Seaforth, Ontario Canada. A former high school vice-principal in Trenton, Ontario, he writes primarily about 19th and 20th century Canadian history with a usual focus on acts exhibiting courage.

== Education ==
John Melady received a Bachelor of Arts in English from The University of Western Ontario. He received his Masters of Education from the University of Toronto.

== Book subjects ==
The subject of his 2005 book Double Trap: The Last Public Hanging in Canada was his ancestral cousin, 19th century convicted murderer Nicholas Melady, who was jailed and executed in Goderich, Ontario, in 1869.

== Books ==
Jordan L. Bergereau H. E. Communications

- Explosion - Trenton Disaster Mika Publishing Company (1980) H.E.Communications 2nd

edition 2014 ISBN 978-0-9938493-0-5

- Escape From Canada! (1981) ISBN 0-7715-9256-6
- Korea: Canada's Forgotten War (1983) ISBN 0-7715-9278-7
- Cross of Valour (1985)
- Overtime Overdue: The Bill Barilko Story (1988) ASIN: B000JLHO72
- Pilots (1989) ISBN 0-7710-5863-2
- Heartbreak and Heroism (1997) ISBN 1-55002-287-3
- Acts of Courage (1998) ISBN 0-590-12449-8
- Star of Courage (2001) ISBN 1-55002-365-9
- Double Trap: The Last Public Hanging in Canada (2005) ISBN 1-55002-571-6
- Pearson's Prize: Canada and the Suez Crisis (2006) ISBN 1-550- 02611-9
- Canadians In Space: The Forever Frontier
- Breakthrough: Canada's Greatest Inventions and Innovations (Dundurn 2013) ISBN 9781459708525
