= Nicholas Melady =

Nicholas Melady Jr. (March 1845 – December 7, 1869) was the last person to be publicly executed in Canada. He was hanged on December 7, 1869, on the outside wall of a jail located in Goderich, Ontario, for the murder of his father, Nicholas Melady Senior and his stepmother Ellen.

== Murder ==
The murders are believed to have been committed on the evening of June 6, 1868 or on the morning of June 7, 1868, on a farm in the present day municipality of Huron East, south of the current community of Seaforth, Ontario. The senior Melday was found dead in the doorway of the bedroom with a gunshot wound to the head. Ellen was found dead with wounds so severe she was almost unrecognizable. She had been shot in the head multiple times and had her throat cut with an axe. Her organs were cut out of her body and a male fetus was found outside of her body. The axe was found lying next to her when the pair were discovered by James Kehoe and his wife. The farmhouse was in a state of disarray and showed signs of a struggle.

== Trial ==
Melady's trial was surrounded by controversy at the time, with allegations of perjury, lost and planted evidence, as well as the unusual use of a female police informant, who posed as a criminal and feigned affection for Melady while he was imprisoned, in an attempt to gain a confession from him. The informant, named in records as "Jenny Smith", was the wife of a local police officer. During the course of the investigation into the crime, seven other members of the Melady family, as well as two other male individuals, were initially jailed as suspects and later released. After 8 hours of deliberation, a jury found Melady guilty on September 17, 1869.

Melady's execution occurred several hours in advance of the officially announced time it was to occur in an attempt to avoid the civil disorder that sometimes accompanied public hangings. It is reported that a crowd of several thousand people were present at the jail at the originally announced time of the execution, many of whom are reported to have shouted their disapproval of the altered schedule of events. On January 1, 1870, three weeks after Melady was hanged, a Canadian federal government Order in Council came into effect that banned all future public executions in Canada.
