= David Lee (Canadian football) =

Canadian football player (born 1990)

No. 91
- Position: Defensive end

Personal information
- Born: September 4, 1990 (age 36); London, Ontario, Canada
- Listed height: 6 ft 4 in (1.93 m)
- Listed weight: 247 lb (112 kg)

Career information
- College: University of Western Ontario
- CFL draft: 2012: undrafted

Career history
- 2012–2013: Toronto Argonauts
- 2014: Saskatchewan Roughriders

Awards and highlights
- Grey Cup champion (2012)
- Stats at CFL.ca (archive)

David Lee (born September 4, 1990) is a Canadian former professional football defensive end. He signed as a free agent with the Toronto Argonauts on May 30, 2012, and spent two seasons with them. Lee was a member of the 100th Grey Cup winning team. He also played college football for the Western Ontario Mustangs. During his time at the University of Western Ontario, Lee was an Academic All Canadian, a first team OUA All-Star, a member of Team World during the Pro Bowl in 2010, and Western's Defensive MVP in 2012. Lee was released by the Saskatchewan Roughriders on February 13, 2015.
