= Vince Agro =

Canadian mayor (died 2020)

Vince Agro (October 20, 1936 – September 4, 2020) was born in the North End of Hamilton. He was acting mayor of Hamilton, in the Canadian province of Ontario from 1976 to 1977. He assumed the position after Victor Copps had a heart attack. He ran for a full term as mayor in 1976, but was defeated by fellow alderman Jack MacDonald. He served as alderman for Ward Two from 1970 until 1976, and again from 1978 until 1997.

In 2012, Agro published his first novel, The Good Doctor. It was a finalist for the Scotiabank Giller Prize Reader's Choice contest. He died in 2020, aged 83.
