= CKNX =

CKNX may refer to:

- CKNX (AM), a radio station (920 AM) licensed to Wingham, Ontario, Canada
- CKNX-FM, a radio station (101.7 FM) licensed to Wingham, Ontario, Canada
- CKNX-TV, a defunct television station (channel 8) formerly licensed to Wingham, Ontario, Canada
