= Crediton, Ontario =

Community in South Huron, Ontario, Canada

- Community
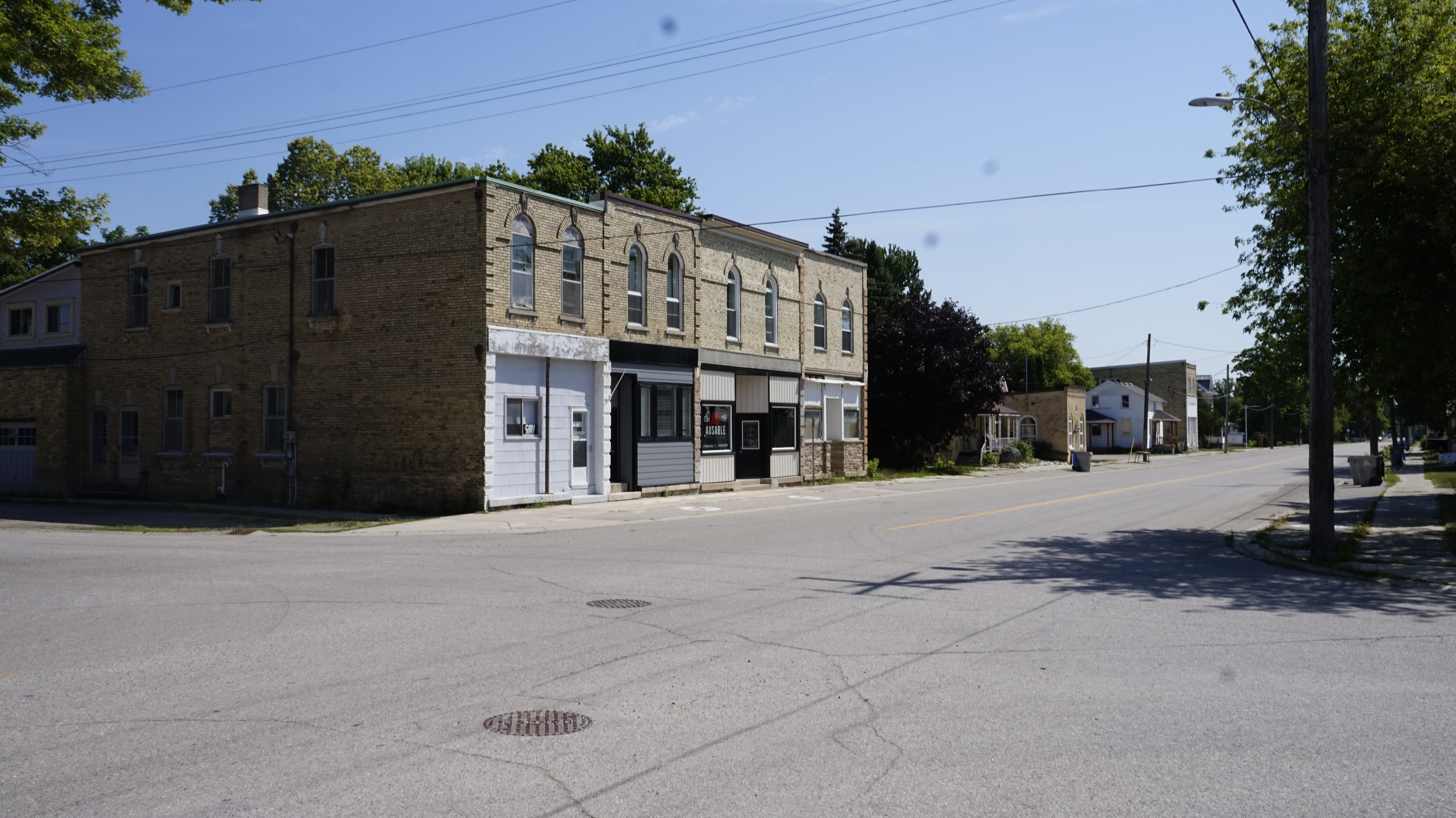
- Main street of Crediton, Ontario
- Interactive map of Crediton, Ontario
- Coordinates: 43°18′02″N 81°32′54″W
- Country: Canada
- Province: Ontario
- County: Huron
- Municipality: South Huron
- (Population data specific to Crediton unavailable; part of South Huron)
- Time zone: UTC-5 (EST)
  - Summer (DST): UTC-4 (EDT)
- Postal code: N0M 1M0
- Area codes: 519, 226

Crediton is a small rural community in the municipality of South Huron, Ontario, Canada. It is located in the southern part of Huron County, approximately 31 mi (50 km) north west of London, near the town of Exeter. It also located near Grand Bend, Huron Park & Centrallia which is home of RCAF Station Centralia which currently operates under Centralia/James T. Field Memorial Aerodrome. The area is known for its agricultural surroundings, historical background and early German settlers of Upper Canada, lots of them settling in the area due to promises of the Canada Company.

== Geography ==
Crediton is situated in the agricultural heartland of southwestern Ontario, characterized by rolling farmlands and rural landscapes.

The community is part of the traditional territory of the Anishinaabe people, specifically the Chippewas of Kettle and Stony Point First Nation and the Aamjiwnaang First Nation.

It is a little known fact of the area but Black Creek river flows through it & is part of the St. Lawrence River watershed . As well the Ausable River flows through parts of Crediton as well.

== History ==
The area around Crediton, including the village itself, is part of the Huron Tract, which was surveyed and opened for settlement in the 19th century. The township of Stephen, in which Crediton is located, saw its first settlers in the 1830s. Crediton developed as a small rural community within this agricultural region. In the 1800s the brick industry was thriving in Crediton, various locations in the area such as the Mount Carmel, Ontario church were built using bricks from Crediton. There is also a tribute to the community of Motherwell that uses bricks from Crediton. Crediton had various mills such as flour mills, flax mills & roller mills in the area up until the 1900s, some of the buildings of the mills are still standing today. As well had various butcher shops and more, one of them being owned by the Beaver family at a point in time and various other locals such as Charles Hugo "Hook" Schenk (1894–1979) (son of Paul Schenk). Previously before 2001, the village of Crediton was considered a police village. Crediton used to be divided as two separate entities, Crediton West and Crediton East.

== Demographics ==
As of the 2021 Census, the municipality of South Huron had a population of 10,063. Crediton is one of several communities within South Huron, but specific population figures for Crediton alone are not readily available.

== Education ==
Elementary education in Crediton is provided by Stephen Central Public School, which serves students from Junior Kindergarten to Grade 6, as of 2013 the South Huron District High School serves as a public middle school for students from grade 7 to grade 8. A Catholic school in located in the Mount Carmel/Dashwood area operated under the Huron-Perth Catholic District School Board. For secondary education, students attend South Huron District High School in Exeter which is operated under the Avon Maitland District School Board. Previously there used to be a schoolhouse located in Crediton.

== Notable people ==
- Henry Eilber (1857–1943), Ontario businessman and political figure, previous deputy (legislator) of Stephen, mayor in 19th century, born in Canada West.
- Lulu Odell Gaiser (1896–1965), lecturer, botanist and early professor, assistant professor, associate professor at McMaster University, pathologist at United States Department of Agriculture in Washington, D.C. and research assistant of the Gray Herbarium at Harvard University, received early education at Crediton Public School and Exeter High School.
- William Saunders (1823–1894) England born, Canadian agriculturalist, entomologist and pharmacist, buried in Crediton, Ontario.

== Points of interest ==
- Crediton Community Centre is a community facility that serves as a hub for local events and activities.
- Crediton Sportsplex is a sportsplex beside the Crediton Community Centre, which features a baseball diamond, pavilion with accessible washrooms and playground equipment.
- Zion United Church is an historic church that has been a part of the community for many years, fostering spiritual and community gatherings.
- Crediton Conservation Area is a conservation area located in Crediton, that has a dog park and access to the Ausable River for canoeing, kayaking or fishing operated by the Ausable Bayfield Conservation Authority.
- Village Post Bed and Breakfast in Crediton is a heritage property designated by South Huron municipality under the part IV of the Ontario Heritage Act. The house was built by Henry Eilber in 1888. The stain glass windows were imported from Germany and the bricks came from the Crediton brick yards.

== See also ==
- Centralia/James T. Field Memorial Aerodrome
- RCAF Station Centralia
- List of unincorporated communities in Ontario
- Hay Swamp
