= Exeter, Ontario =

Exeter
- Town
- Exeter, Ontario
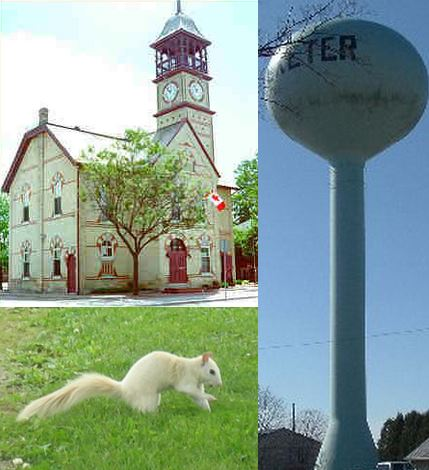
- Top left: Exeter's town hall constructed in 1887, Right: Exeter's water tower, Bottom left: An Exeter, Ontario White Squirrel
- Motto: "Home of the White Squirrel"
- Location within Ontario
- Coordinates: 43°21′N 81°29′W
- Country: Canada
- Province: Ontario
- County: Huron

Area
  - Total: 4.39 km^{2} (1.69 sq mi)

Population (2016)
  - Total: 4,649
  - Density: 1,058.8/km^{2} (2,742/sq mi)
- Demonym: Exonian
- Time zone: EST
- Postal Code: N0M 1S0 & N0M 3S0
- Area codes: 519, 226
- Website: southhuron.ca

Exeter is a community in the municipality of South Huron, in the southern portion of Huron County, Ontario, Canada, located approximately 40 kilometres north of London. The community proclaims itself the "Home of the White Squirrel", owing to the presence of the unusually-coloured mammals. The largest attraction in the town . Exeter's mascot, "Willis The White Wonder", can be seen at many community events throughout the year, including Canada Day celebrations, the Exeter Rodeo, and the Santa Claus Parade.

== History ==
. By 1853, Exeter had grown into a community of over 300 with the help of Isaac Carling bringing immigrants from the Exeter and Devon areas of England. The original Carling homestead, a designated historical landmark still stands on Huron St.W. It was on July 1, 1873, when the settlements north and south of the Ausable River (Francistown and Exeter respectively) merged to form the Village of Exeter.

The first written reference to Exeter was by Rev. William Proudfoot who passed through the area in 1833. He described the area as having "excellent soil" with the trees "being chiefly maple, elm, oak, ironwood and black ash". When he passed through the area through London Road, which was barely a trail, there were only two dwellings in what is now Exeter. They were the homes of James Willis and William McConnell. Proudfoot spent the night in McConnell's home which also served as a tavern for the area.

Railway service arrived in Exeter in the 1870s. This was in the form of the London, Huron and Bruce Railway. Incorporated in 1871, it was leased to the Great Western Railway in 1873, which also provided financial guarantees for its construction costs. Completed in 1876, it was built northward from a junction near London, crossing the original Grand Trunk Railway mainline (later the CN Forest Subdivision) at Lucan Crossing, the Buffalo and Lake Huron Railway (later the CN Goderich Subdivision) at Clinton Junction, and terminating at Wingham Junction with the Wellington, Grey and Bruce Railway. It passed through Exeter on its way from Lucan Crossing to Clinton Junction.

A rail yard existed in Exeter by 1949, as well as a spur line serving the Exeter Produce and Storage Company. By this time, the railway had come under the management of the Grand Trunk conglomerate and, later, the Canadian National Railways (CN). The line was later sold to the Goderich-Exeter Railway (GEXR) in 1991.

Exeter eventually became a town of over 4,700 people. Paintings of some of Exeter's historical citizens, by the late artist Harry Burke, may be seen at the Exeter Legion Hall.

Exeter was damaged by an F2 tornado on December 12, 1946.

== Transportation ==
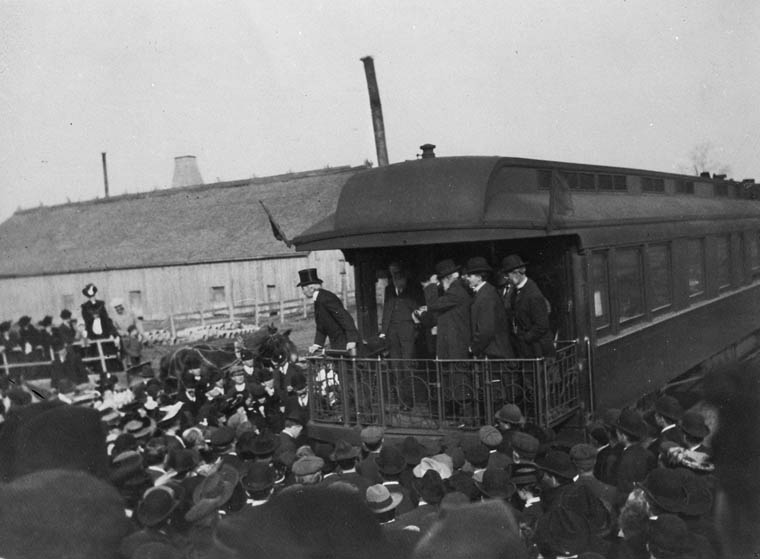
Sir Wilfrid Laurier speaking from the platform of a railway observation car in Exeter during the federal election campaign, November 1904.

Exeter is located on the north-south Highway 4. At the north end of the community, Highway 4 intersects with County Road 83. This intersection of Highway 4 and County Road 83 is the busiest intersection in Huron County.

Freight train service is provided by the Goderich-Exeter Railway, connecting to Canadian National Railway service at London, Stratford and Toronto. The line running through Exeter is most commonly used by the Hensall District Co-Operative.

For general aviation, Exeter is served by the nearby Sexsmith/Exeter Airport along with the Centralia/James T. Field Memorial Aerodrome.

Exeter is served by scheduled bus service to Owen Sound and London.

== Organizations ==
Exeter is home to many community organizations including:

- The Cultural Collective
- The Exeter BIA
- The Exeter Lions Club
- The Huron Waves Music Festival
- The Exeter Farmers Market
- The Independent Order of Oddfellows
- The South Huron Hospital Foundation
- The Ausable Bayfield Conservation Authority
- The South Huron Community Choirs: Adult and Handbells

== Media ==
- Exeter Times-Advocate - Exeter's local newspaper, owned by Metroland Publishing. This paper publishes once-weekly, on Wednesdays.
- The Examiner - Formerly the Exeter Examiner, first issue published in 2015. This paper is not associated with the Times-Advocate and serves the larger area around Exeter.
- Cable television is provided by Eastlink TV and includes local community station ETM Television.
- CKXM-FM 90.5 "myFM" - Exeter and area local news coverage, adult contemporary music.
- CKNX-FM 101.7 "The One" - local, regional and national news and adult contemporary music
- CIBU-FM 94.5/91.7 "The Bull" - local, regional and national news and classic rock music

== Sports ==
- Exeter Hawks - Exeter's junior hockey team that plays in the Provincial Junior Hockey League
- Exeter Mohawks - a defunct Senior Hockey team that played in the Western Ontario Athletic Association Senior Hockey League

== Notable people ==
- Harriet Brooks (1876–1933), early pioneer in nuclear physics
- Charles Trick Currelly (1876–1957), founder and first Curator of the Royal Ontario Museum
- Paul De Lisle (b. 1963), bassist for Smash Mouth
- Donald Fleming (1905–1986) Canadian Federal Finance Minister, Governor of the World Bank, International Monetary Fund official
- Tim Long, executive producer and writer, The Simpsons
- John A MacNaughton (1945–2013), investment banker and founding President and CEO of the Canada Pension Plan Investment Board
- Al Pickard (1895–1975), president of the Canadian Amateur Hockey Association and a Hockey Hall of Fame inductee
- David Shaw, a professional hockey player.

== Landmarks ==
- MacNaughton Park, including scenic gardens
- Morrison Dam Conservation Area
- Restored Town Hall
- Carling House

== Education ==
Public education in Exeter is managed by the Avon Maitland District School Board, which has Exeter Elementary School and South Huron District High School in the town, on adjoining properties. Catholic education is under the Huron-Perth Catholic District School Board, which manages Precious Blood Catholic Elementary School in Exeter. There is no Catholic secondary school in the town; students have to travel to Clinton or Stratford.

== Health and wellness facilities ==
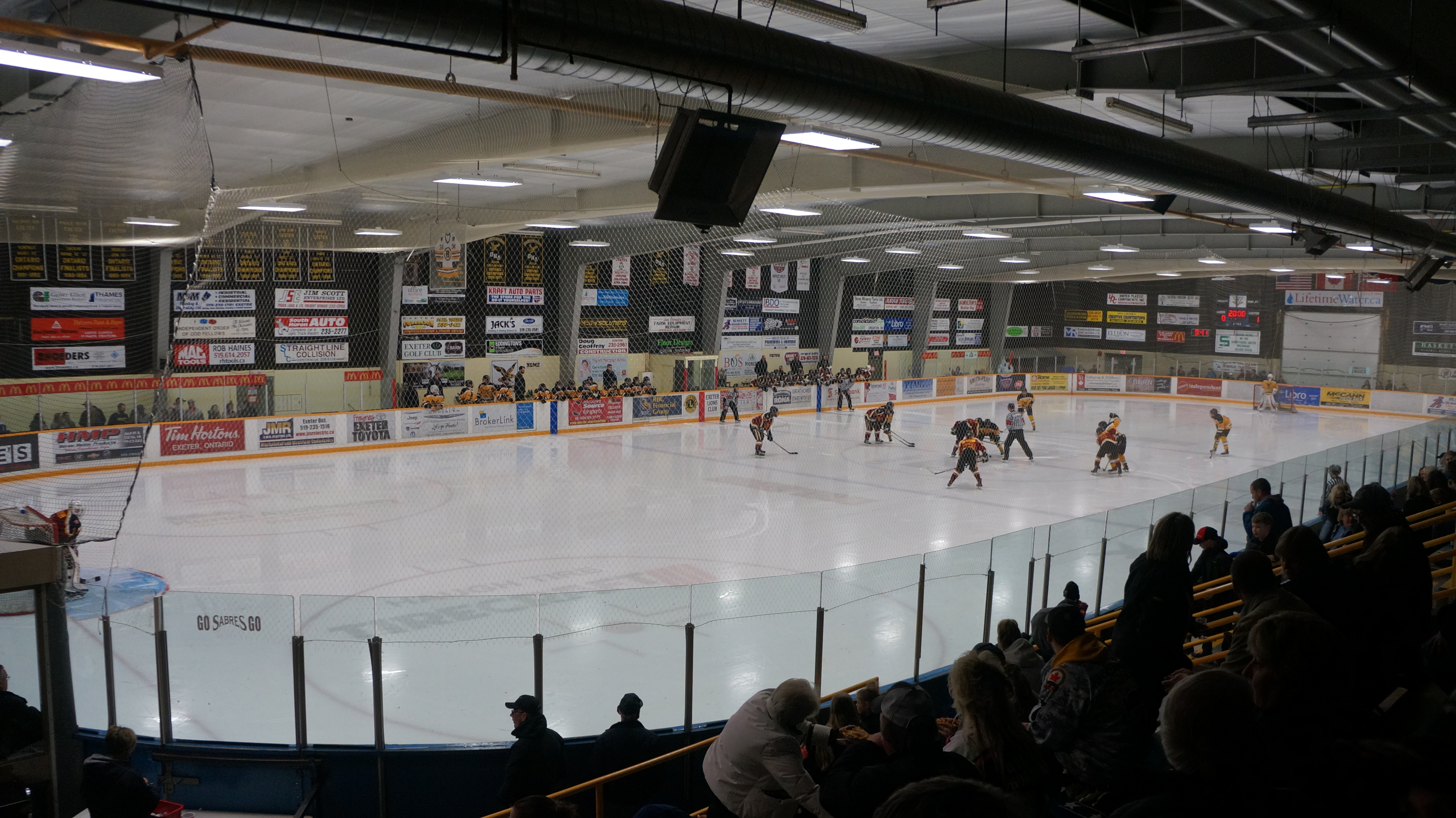
South Huron Recreation Centre

Health and wellness facilities in the Exeter area include the South Huron Hospital, South Huron Medical Centre, and the Grand Bend and Area Community Health Centre. Jessica's House is a residential hospice that offers care close to home. Community Psychiatric Services and CMHA Middlesex offer mental health support services. The Exeter Villa and One Care Home & Community Support Services offers help seniors in all capacities.

== See also ==
- Sexsmith/Exeter Airport
- South Huron
- Huron County, Ontario
- Crediton, Ontario
- Centralia/James T. Field Memorial Aerodrome
