= Sodom, Ontario =

Community in Ontario, Canada

Coordinates: 43.355765°N 81.539068°W

Sodom was a small Canadian logging industry-based community that existed in the last quarter of the 19th century and first half of the 20th century. It was located on the boundary between the present day municipalities of South Huron and Bluewater, Ontario, Canada, on Dashwood Road approximately 500 meters west of the present-day intersection of Dashwood Road and Ausable Line, at the Dashwood Road bridge over the Ausable River. The original site of the community is now occupied by South Huron and Bluewater.

== History ==
Sodom began in 1873 when two local businessmen constructed a sawmill. Thomas Greenway, a future Premier of Manitoba Province, formed a partnership with Robert Bissett for the enterprise, which was at first inadvertently built on land reserved for road construction, and had to be relocated to the west side of the Ausable River, south of Dashwood Road. The mill was situated in a densely forested old growth stand of hardwood trees in an area known as Hay Swamp. In 1877 the mill and surrounding property were sold to brothers Samuel and Silas Stanlake.

Expansion required the construction of a group of small houses to accommodate the growing number of employees and their families. A number of social organizations developed in the community, including a glee club, which performed at local events. A one-room school was constructed, the name of which was recorded as "U.S.S. (United School Section) #13 Hay [township] and Stephen [township], Sodom School". The school was located on the north side of Dashwood Road and east of the river. Regular church services and a Sunday school existed in private homes in the community, as well as a chapter of the Royal Templars of Temperance, which promoted complete abstinence from all alcoholic beverages, in the context of the temperance movement. The group hosted a district council meeting for the organization in 1896 in a nearby orchard. Public school inspector Elgin G. Tom, a resident of Goderich, Ontario, was the president of the regional district council of the organization.

== Origin of the name ==
"Sodom" has come to refer to any "place well known for vice and corruption". The community is believed to have been named in the midst of the temperance movement in the 19th century by Chester Prouty, a local school official, who objected to what he saw as the community's overconsumption of alcohol and the wild partying that followed.

== Final years ==
As local timber availability dwindled during the first quarter of the 20th century, the community began to dissolve and the site was largely converted to agricultural use. A tragedy occurred on June 2, 1923, when the home of Silas Stanlake was destroyed by fire and six people perished. Education records indicate that the school was in operation until at least 1937.

== Sources ==
- The History of Stephen Township',Susan Muriel Mack: Corporation of The Township of Stephen, 1992, editor: Alice Gibb, Edward Phelps pgs. 72, 223–224, 304
- Exeter, Situate on the London & Goderich Road in the township of Stephen and Usborne, 30 miles from London and in the County of Huron, C.W. : a history of Exeter, Ontario, Joseph L. Wooden Exeter, Ont.: R. Southcott, 1973 pp. 94–95, 253
- Stephen Township: 150 Great Years 1842–1992, ed. Ross Haugh Stephen Township Sesquicentennial Committee, 1992 p. 14

== Online References ==
- Wooden, Joseph L. (1973). "Exeter...: a history of Exeter, Ontario". R. Southcott (via ouroots.ca).
- Mack, Susan Muriel (1992). "The History of Stephen Township". Corporation of The Township of Stephen (via ouroots.ca).
