= Andrew Hicks (politician) =

Canadian politician from Ontario

Member of the Ontario Provincial Parliament for Huron South
- In office October 20, 1919 – May 10, 1923
- Preceded by: Henry Eilber
- Succeeded by: Nelson William Trewartha

Personal details
- Party: United Farmers of Ontario

Andrew Hicks (born 1874) was a Canadian farmer and politician. He represented Huron South in the Legislative Assembly of Ontario from 1919 to 1923.

== See also ==
- 15th Parliament of Ontario
