= Lulu Odell Gaiser =

Canadian botanist and educator

- Born: June 1896; Huron County, Ontario, Canada
- Died: April 7, 1965 (aged 68)
- Resting place: Crediton, Ontario, Canada
- Education: A.B., University of Western Ontario, 1916; A.M., Columbia University, 1921; PhD, Columbia University, 1927
- Occupations: Botanist; Educator
- Employers: McMaster University; United States Department of Agriculture; Harvard University
- Known for: Pioneering work in cytotaxonomy; First female faculty member at McMaster University
- Parents: William “Black Bill” Gaiser; Salome Schwartz

Lulu Odell Gaiser (June 1896 – April 7, 1965) was a Canadian botanist and educator, recognized as the first female faculty member at McMaster University and a pioneer in cytotaxonomy. Her extensive work on plant chromosome counts, particularly within the Compositae family, earned her international acclaim and advanced the understanding of plant genetics.

== Early life and education ==
Lulu Odell Gaiser was born in June 1896 in Huron County, Ontario, Canada, to Salome Schwartz and William “Black Bill” Gaiser (Note: His father was named William Gaiser, but was generally known as Black Bill in the area.). Raised on a family farm near Crediton, Ontario, she attended Crediton Public School and Exeter High School, both are located in Ontario. She graduated with a Bachelor of Arts (A.B.) from the University of Western Ontario in 1916, one of only ten women in her class. After completing teacher training at Toronto’s College of Education, she served as principal of Crediton’s continuation school. In 1919, Gaiser moved to New York City to teach at an experimental school for immigrant children while pursuing graduate studies at Columbia University. She earned her Master of Arts (A.M.) in Plant Pathology in 1921 and her Doctor of Philosophy (PhD) in Cytology in 1927 under Professor R.A. Harper, with her thesis on the genus Anthurium marking the first cytotaxonomic work published by a Canadian.

== Academic career ==
Gaiser began her academic career as a junior pathologist at the United States Department of Agriculture in Washington, D.C., in 1924, studying plant diseases. In 1925, she joined McMaster University as a lecturer, becoming the institution’s first female faculty member. She progressed through the ranks of assistant professor and associate professor, achieving tenure in 1937 and serving as head of the Botany Department from 1942. Gaiser was instrumental in establishing McMaster’s first research-focused greenhouse in 1930, which supported her cytotaxonomic studies. In 1949, she moved to Harvard University, working as a research assistant at the Gray Herbarium, where she focused on the cytotaxonomy of the genus Liatris.

== Contributions to cytotaxonomy ==
Gaiser’s pioneering work in cytotaxonomy involved extensive surveys of plant chromosome counts, published between 1926 and 1933, which gained international recognition. Her doctoral research on Anthurium was a landmark study, establishing her as the first Canadian to publish in this field. Her work on the Compositae family, particularly the genus Liatris, advanced the understanding of plant genetics and species identification through chromosomal patterns. Gaiser’s publications were noted for their speed and productivity, as highlighted by McMaster Biology professor Elizabeth Weretilnyk.

== Post-retirement work ==
After retiring from Harvard University in 1954, Gaiser returned to Crediton, Ontario, to care for her father. In 1957, she conducted a floristic survey of Lambton County, funded by the Ontario Agricultural College and the American Philosophical Society. Her final book, focusing on her botanical research, was published posthumously.

== Advocacy for women in academia ==
Gaiser was a trailblazer for women in academia, advocating for greater inclusion at McMaster University. Her efforts contributed to the appointment of a Dean of Women in 1930 and secured women’s access to the university library on Saturdays, addressing barriers faced by female students and faculty.

== Publications ==
Gaiser published several influential lists of plant chromosome counts between 1926 and 1933, which were widely recognized in the scientific community. Her doctoral thesis on Anthurium was the first cytotaxonomic work by a Canadian. Additionally, a posthumous book summarizing her botanical research was published after her death in 1965.

== Recognition ==
McMaster University honored Gaiser with a commemorative plaque, later relocated to a garden on campus. Discussions are ongoing to further recognize her contributions to botany and women’s inclusion in academia.

== Legacy ==
Gaiser’s influence extended beyond her scientific contributions. She mentored numerous students, seven of whom earned doctoral degrees from American universities, and supported early botanical surveys at the Royal Botanical Gardens, including a 1932 tree survey of Westdale Ravine and Cootes Paradise Marsh. Her work laid the foundation for modern plant taxonomy and cytogenetics, cementing her status as a pivotal figure in Canadian botany.

== Personal life ==
Gaiser never married and had no children. She cared for her widowed father from 1954 until his death in 1964, following her mother’s passing in 1936. She died on April 7, 1965, at age 68, and was laid to rest at Crediton Evangelical United Brethren Cemetery.

== See also ==
- Cytotaxonomy
- McMaster University
- Royal Botanical Gardens (Ontario)
- Women in science
