= Andrew Kaufman =

Canadian writer, film director, and radio producer

- Born: April 7, 1968 (age 58); Wingham, Ontario, Canada
- Education: F. E. Madill Secondary School
- Occupations: Writer, director, and producer
- Children: Phoenix & Frida
- Writing career
- Notable awards: ReLit Award (2015)

Andrew Kaufman (born 1968) is a Canadian writer, film director, and radio producer, best known for his humorous genre novels.

Born and raised in Wingham, Ontario, Kaufman regularly promotes himself as the second-most famous and/or second-best writer to come from Wingham, as the town is also the birthplace of Alice Munro.

== Career ==
Kaufman was a revolving cast member of the Perpetual Motion Roadshow.

His debut novella, All My Friends Are Superheroes, was published by Coach House Books in 2003, and is a humorous love story between a normal man and a super-heroine, The Perfectionist. The novella is set in a community of superheroes in Toronto, in which the superpowered characters (The Seeker, The Inverse, BusinessMan, etc.) personify different types of people. A 10th anniversary edition with added bonus material was released in April 2013.

His 2013 novel, Born Weird, was shortlisted for the Stephen Leacock Memorial Medal for Humour. His 2010 novel, The Tiny Wife, won the 2015 ReLit Award for Novel. Small Claims and The Ticking Heart were shortlisted for the same award.

== Awards ==
Year	Title	Award	Result	Ref.
2013	Born Weird	Stephen Leacock Memorial Medal for Humour	Shortlist	
2015	The Tiny Wife	ReLit Award for Novel	Winner	
2018	Small Claims	ReLit Award for Novel	Shortlist	
2020	The Ticking Heart	ReLit Award for Novel	Shortlist	

== Works ==
- All My Friends Are Superheroes (2003)
- The Waterproof Bible (2010)
- The Tiny Wife (2010)
- Born Weird (2013)
- Small Claims (2017)
- The Ticking Heart (2019)
- Enjoy Your Stay at the Shamrock Motel (2025)
