= William George Medd =

Canadian politician (1869–1951)

William George Medd (December 14, 1869 – March 27, 1951) was an Ontario agricultural businessman and politician. He represented Huron South in the Legislative Assembly of Ontario from 1926 to 1934 as a United Farmers member.

He was born and raised in Hullett Township, Huron County, Ontario and educated at the Ontario Agricultural College in Guelph. In 1902, he married Almina Gregory with whom he had a son and two daughters.

Medd owned and managed creameries in Exeter and Winchelsea, Ontario, and at one time was president of the Western Ontario Dairymen's Association. Having an active interest in religion, he also served as the president of the Ontario Religious Education Council, was a member of the executive of the Ontario Temperance Federation, and was a commissioner to the first General Council of the United Church of Canada.
