= Wellswood =

Wellswood may refer to:

- Wellswood, England
- Wellswood, Florida
- Wellswood, a plantation in Meeker, Louisiana

== See also ==
- Wellwood
