= Archibald Bishop =

Canadian politician (1829–1901)

Archibald Bishop (September 6, 1829 – April 25, 1901) was an Ontario political figure. He represented Huron South in the Legislative Assembly of Ontario as a Liberal member from 1873 to 1894.

He was born in Edinburgh, Scotland, was educated in Lanarkshire and came to Canada in 1849. He served on the council for Usborne Township and was warden for Huron County from 1873 to 1874. He was elected in an 1873 by-election when the sitting member resigned to accept a post as sheriff for the county.

== Electoral history ==
Ontario provincial by-election, October 1873: Huron South Resignation of Robert Gibbons
Party	Candidate	Votes	%	±%
Liberal	Archibald Bishop	1,424	50.25	−3.30
Conservative	G. Case	1,410	49.75	+3.30
Total valid votes		2,834	100.0	−2.78
Liberal hold		Swing		−3.30
Source: History of the Electoral Districts, Legislatures and Ministries of the Province of Ontario

1875 Ontario general election: Huron South
Party	Candidate	Votes	%	±%
Liberal	Archibald Bishop	1,440	51.39	+1.14
Conservative	G. Case	1,362	48.61	−1.14
Turnout		2,802	72.53	
Eligible voters		3,863		
Liberal hold		Swing		+1.14
Source: Elections Ontario

1879 Ontario general election: Huron South
Party	Candidate	Votes	%	±%
Liberal	Archibald Bishop	1,893	52.21	+0.81
Conservative	Mr. Jackson	1,733	47.79	−0.81
Total valid votes		3,626	70.75	−1.78
Eligible voters		5,125		
Liberal hold		Swing		+0.81
Source: Elections Ontario
