= Mount Carmel, Middlesex County, Ontario =

Coordinates: 43.254213°N 81.615589°W

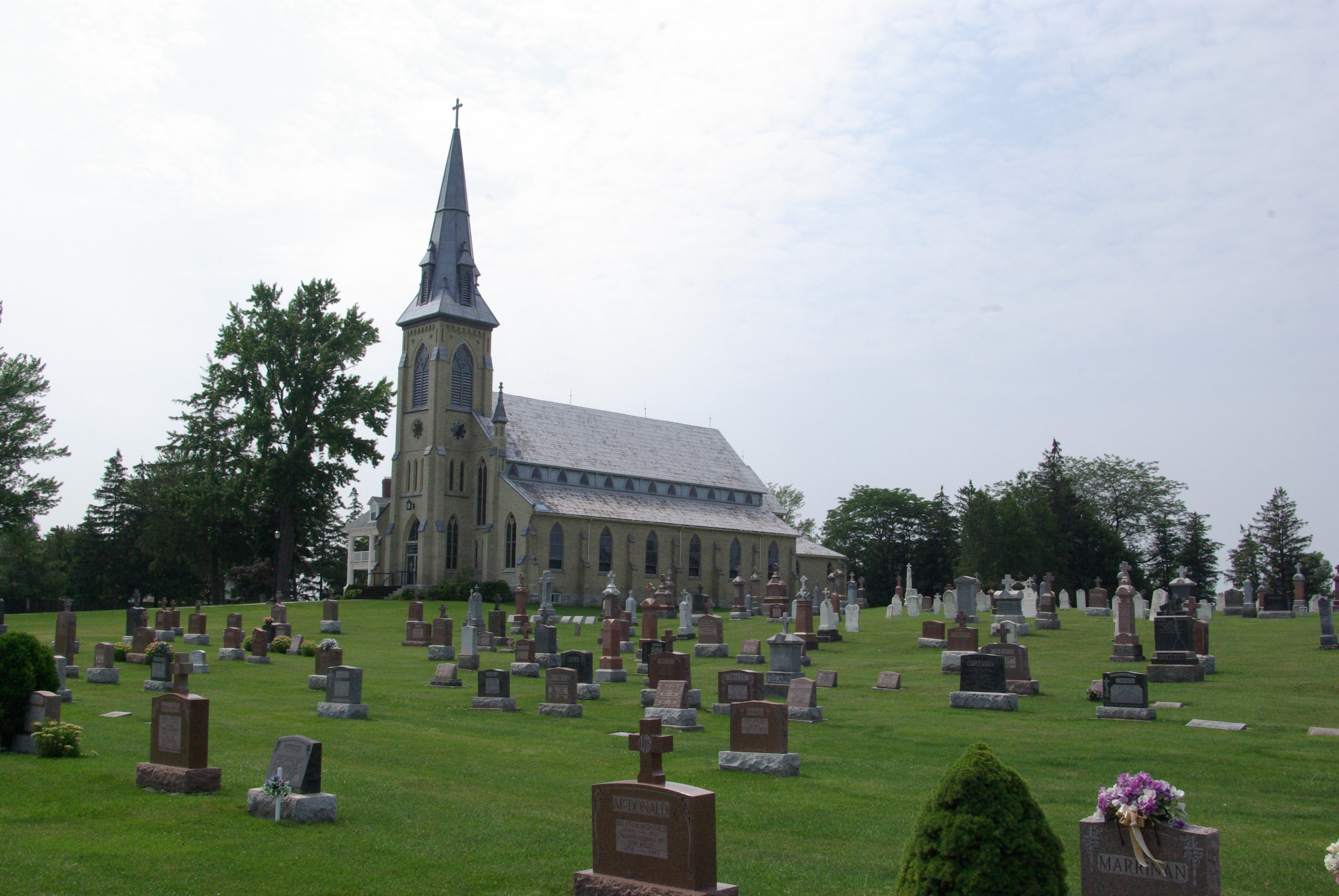
Our Lady of Mount Carmel Church, Mount Carmel, Ontario

Mount Carmel (formerly named at various times in the past, Limerick, Cranford and Offa) is a primarily residential hamlet located in southwestern Ontario, Canada.

== Geography ==
Mount Carmel is located at the intersection of Mount Carmel Drive, Bronson Line and Lieury Road, on the boundary between the municipality of North Middlesex and the municipality of South Huron. Mount Carmel Drive constitutes the north-south boundary between Middlesex and Huron counties.

== History ==
The community of Mount Carmel was founded in the 1830s and 1840s with the arrival of Irish settlers who had initially resided in the vicinity of Pickering, Ontario, when they first arrived in Canada, but were drawn by advertisements for low cost Canada Company land available in the southern part of the Huron Tract for agricultural purposes. To meet the needs of the predominantly Roman Catholic population of the emerging community, in the late 1840s, a small frame church was constructed near the banks of Parkhill Creek, two kilometers (1.25 miles) east of the present site of the hamlet on Mount Carmel Drive. The church was located on donated land on the farm of Daniel Coughlin. By 1850, a small commercial core had begun to form at the site of the present intersection and the church building was relocated to a small hill at the northwest corner of the community. During this period, the name of the hamlet was in all likelihood Limerick.

The community's growth continued in the 1850s with the arrival of the Grand Trunk Railway line in the region. Mount Carmel became a local stage coach stop, providing a means to transport farm products and passengers to both nearby Dashwood and the new railway station at nearby Parkhill. The first school used by the community was constructed in the early 1860s, approximately 2.5 kilometers (1.6 mi) north of the hamlet near the present day intersection of Bronson Line and South Road. In the mid-1870s, a frame school was built near the corner of Bronson Line and Mount Carmel Drive in the centre of the community.

Rural economic growth in the 1860s and 1870s, in the new province of Ontario, was reflected in Mount Carmel in an expansion of the number of businesses serving the hamlet and the surrounding rural community. At various times Mount Carmel supported, three hotels, a general store and post office, a shoemaker, two medical doctors, two blacksmiths, both a cider and chopping mill, as well as a dressmaker, hat shop and telephone exchange. The name of the community became Cranford, on July 1, 1867, with the opening of the first post office. The date coincides with the founding of the country of Canada as a modern state. One year later, the name of the hamlet was again changed, this time to Offa. The cornerstone of the moderately large Roman Catholic church, named in honour of Our Lady of Mount Carmel that presently exists in the community, was laid on July 24, 1887. Its construction was completed in 1888 using bricks from Crediton. The large residence for parish priests, located immediately south of the church, was built in 1909. The community adopted its current name, Mount Carmel, in 1889.

== See also ==
- South Huron
- Huron County, Ontario

== Sources ==
- Mack, Susan Muriel (1992). The History of Stephen Township. Corporation of The Township of Stephen, pgs. 183,366,377
- McGillivray Township History Group (1992) McGillivray Remembers 1842-1992., pgs.29,53,68,69,131,138

== Online References ==
- Mack, Susan Muriel (1992). "The History of Stephen Township". Corporation of The Township of Stephen (via ouroots.ca). Archived from the original on 2007-09-26.
- "McGillivray Remembers 1842 1992". McGillivray Township History Group, Ailsa Craig (via ouroots.ca). 1992. Archived from the original on 2007-09-29.
