= Eden Grove, Bruce County, Ontario =

Unincorporated community in Bruce County, Ontario, Canada

Coordinates: 44.217°N 81.228°W

Location of Eden Grove in Ontario

Eden Grove is an unincorporated community in Bruce County, Ontario. The community was also once called Pinkerton Station, when it was used by the Canadian National Railway as a flag stop.

The community was once a stop on the Wellington, Grey and Bruce Railway, a shortline railway that ran in 19th Century to early 20th Century. The station building was repurposed for private use following the demise of the line.
