= Wellwood =

Wellwood, Welwood, or Welwod may refer to:

== Places ==
- Wellwood, Fife, a small village to the north of Dunfermline, Fife, Scotland
- Wellwood, Manitoba, an unincorporated community in Canada
- Wellwood Cemetery, a Jewish cemetery in Pinelawn, New York, U.S.
- Welwood Murray Cemetery, a cemetery in Palm Springs, California, U.S.

== People ==
- Caroline Wellwood (1870s–1947), Canadian nurse missionary in China
- Ellis Wellwood Sifton (1891–1917), Canadian soldier
- Eric Wellwood (born 1990), Canadian ice hockey player
- James Wellwood (1892-?), Australian World War I flying ace
- James Wellwood (physician) (1652-1727), English physician
- John Welwood (1943–2019), American psychologist
- Kyle Wellwood (born 1983), Canadian professional ice hockey player
- William Welwod (1578–1622), Scottish jurist

== Media ==
- Wellwood (film), a science-fiction film
