= F. E. Madill Secondary School =

F.E. Madill School

Location
- 231 Madill Drive; Wingham, Ontario, N0G 2W0; Canada; 43°52′56″N 81°18′22″W

Information
- School type: Public, high school
- Motto: "Fidelis et Paratus" (Faithful and Prepared)
- Founded: September 1906
- School board: Avon Maitland District School Board
- Superintendent: Mike Ash
- School number: 953776
- Principal: Katherine Wilson
- Grades: 7–12
- Enrollment: 900 (2011)
- Language: English
- Colours: Purple and white
- Mascot: Victor-E the Mustang
- Team name: Madill Mustangs
- Website: femss.amdsb.ca

F.E. Madill School (formerly Wingham High School and Wingham District SeconSchool and F.E. Madill Secondary School) is a high school in Wingham, Ontario, Canada. It is in the Avon Maitland District School Board and over 800 students from grades 7-12 currently attend the school. The school is well known for sports teams who participate in various competitions throughout Ontario.

== History ==
The school opened in September 1906 as three small buildings in the Wingham Public School. Later, construction began on an actual high school. The increased population and the introduction of shop and home ec classes led to the construction of a new school. It was sold to W.T. Cruickshank for a dollar and the former location became a radio station (CKNX, AM920). Because so many students came from out of town in 1968, there was a contest held to try to find a new name for the school. The winning name was F.E. Madill, named after the school principal at the time, Frank E. Madill. On March 31, 2010, FE Madill held a pre-release screening of a documentary film entitled Still Bill. In September 2012, grade 7s and 8s were enrolled at the school.

== Clubs ==
- Yearbook
- Reach for the Top: A trivia based competitive team which has participated in regional competitions.
- Peer Mentors: Students who help first year students with socialization and to feel accepted at Madill
- Radio Club: the school's morning announcements crew
- Students Council: Students who provide fun filled activities, dances, pep rallies, and events
- Ontario Students Against Impaired Driving (OSAID): An -antidrunk driving initiative which is found across the province of Ontario, aimed primarily at youth involvement in combatting impaired driving. This Council encourages the student population to practice responsible drinking and to drive while not under the influence of alcohol. OSAID regularly holds anti Drinking activities, such as a mocktail sales, or stage events.
- The Violet Thespians: the school's Drama Club

== See also ==
- Education in Ontario
- List of secondary schools in Ontario
