= Henry Eilber =

Canadian politician

Henry Eilber (November 1857 – January 17, 1943) was an Ontario businessman and political figure. He represented Huron South in the Legislative Assembly of Ontario as a Conservative member from 1898 to 1919.

He was born in Crediton, Canada West, the son of Jacob Eilber, a German immigrant who was a merchant and also served as postmaster. After working for a merchant in Exeter and Listowel, Eilber returned to Crediton and opened a store there with his father as partner. In 1880, he married Elizabeth Kruttiger. He was a member of the Stephen Township council, also serving as reeve for three years and township clerk for 34 years. After his father's death in 1901, Eilber sold the store and opened an insurance office. He was manager and secretary-treasurer for the Hay Township Mutual Fire Assurance company from 1881 to 1933. He retired from politics in 1919. In March 1885 the Department of Agriculture dispatched Henry Eilber, to act as agent "for diffusing information in Germany respecting the Dominion of Canada as a suitable field for German settlement." Employed for three months at a salary of $300, Eilber was specifically instructed to "offer a bonus of five dollars per adult... to booking agents for all immigrants of suitable class from Germany upon their arrival in Manitoba."
