= Isaac Carling =

Canadian politician

Isaac Carling (April 9, 1825 – August 29, 1895) was an Ontario businessman and political figure. He represented Huron South in the Legislative Assembly of Ontario as a Conservative member from 1868 to 1871.

He was born in London Township in 1825, the son of Thomas Carling, the founder of the Carling brewing company. He apprenticed as a tanner in London and then moved to Exeter in 1847, where he established a tannery in partnership with his brother John Carling. He also opened a general store. In 1846, Carling had married Ann Balkwill. In 1851, he was appointed an inspector of taverns for the area. He served on the council for the United Townships of Usborne and Stephen, also serving as reeve for Stephen in 1867 and as the first reeve for Exeter in 1873. Carling was defeated by Robert Gibbons in the provincial general election of 1867, but he was declared elected in 1868 after an appeal. In 1871, Carling was defeated by Gibbons for the same seat. During his time in office, Carling petitioned the government for land in the Exeter region, then under the control of the Canada Company, to be sold to settlers. He was Master of the local Masonic Lodge.

He died at his home in Exeter in 1895, after suffering a paralysing stroke several years earlier.

== Electoral history ==
1867 Ontario general election: Huron South
Party	Candidate	Votes	%
Liberal	Robert Gibbons	1,558	50.16
Conservative	Isaac Carling	1,548	49.84
Total valid votes		3,106	82.00
Eligible voters		3,788	
Liberal pickup new district.			
Source: Elections Ontario

1871 Ontario general election: Huron South
Party	Candidate	Votes	%	±%
Liberal	Robert Gibbons	1,561	53.55	+3.39
Conservative	Isaac Carling	1,354	46.45	−3.39
Turnout		2,915	71.64	−10.36
Eligible voters		4,069		
Liberal hold		Swing		+3.39
Source: Elections Ontario
