= CIBU-FM =

Radio station in Wingham, Ontario

Coordinates: 44°05′26″N 81°12′25″W

- Wingham, Ontario; Canada
- Broadcast area: Mid-Western Ontario
- Frequency: 94.5 MHz
- Branding: Cool 94.5

Programming
- Format: Classic hits
- Affiliations: United Stations Radio Networks

Ownership
- Owner: Blackburn Radio

History
- First air date: April 1, 2005
- Call sign meaning: BU for The Bull, branding at launch

Technical information
- Class: C1
- ERP: 75,000 watts
- HAAT: 215 metres (705 ft)
- Repeater: CIBU-FM-1 (91.7 MHz) Bluewater

Links
- Website: wingham.coolradio.ca

CIBU-FM is a Canadian radio station, which broadcasts at 94.5 FM in Wingham, Ontario. The station broadcasts a classic hits format with the brand name Cool 94.5.

In 2003, the CRTC denied the application by Blackburn Radio. In 2004, Blackburn Radio was given approval to operate a new FM radio station at Wingham. The station was launched on April 1, 2005, by Blackburn Radio with the branding 94.5 The Bull.

The station's transmitter is located near Formosa, and it broadcasts the signal with an effective radiated power of 75,000 watts. The station is co-located with sister stations CKNX and CKNX-FM.

The station also re-broadcasts at 91.7 in Bluewater under the call sign CIBU-FM-1.

The station's morning show is hosted by Erik Wedekind.

In April 2014, the station removed new rock from its playlist. Currently, it primarily plays classic rock with the branding Classic Rock 94.5.

On September 4, 2020, the station switched to a classic hits format branded as Cool 94.5.
