= Exonian =

== People ==
An Exonian is a member (or former member) of one of the following educational establishments:

- A student or graduate of the University of Exeter, England
- A student or graduate of Exeter College, Oxford, England
- A current or past student of Exeter School, England
- A current or past student of Phillips Exeter Academy, US

Or a native of one of the following places:

- the city of Exeter, England.
- the town of Exeter, Ontario, Canada.
- the town of Exeter, New Hampshire, US.
- the former Village of Exeter, in Green County, Wisconsin

== Other uses ==
- The Exonian, the student newspaper of Phillips Exeter Academy
