= Huron South (provincial electoral district) =

Provincial electoral district in Ontario, Canada

Ontario electoral district

Defunct provincial electoral district
- Legislature: Legislative Assembly of Ontario
- District created: 1867
- District abolished: 1929
- First contested: 1867
- Last contested: 1929

Huron South was an electoral riding in Ontario, Canada. It existed from 1867 to 1934, when it was abolished into Huron and Huron—Bruce. It consisted of the southern areas of Huron County.

== Members of Provincial Parliament ==
Huron South
Assembly	Years	Member	Party
Riding created
1st	1867–1868	Robert Gibbons	Conservative
1st	1868–1871	Isaac Carling	Conservative
2nd	1871–1874	Archibald Bishop	Liberal
3rd	1875–1879	Archibald Bishop	Liberal
4th	1879–1883	Archibald Bishop	Liberal
5th	1883–1886	Archibald Bishop	Liberal
6th	1886–1890	Archibald Bishop	Liberal
7th	1890–1894	Archibald Bishop	Liberal
8th	1894–1898	Murdo Young McLean	Liberal
9th	1898–1902	Henry Eilber	Conservative
10th	1902–1904	Henry Eilber	Conservative
11th	1902–1904	Henry Eilber	Conservative
12th	1908–1911	Henry Eilber	Conservative
13th	1911–1914	Henry Eilber	Conservative
14th	1914–1919	Henry Eilber	Conservative
15th	1919–1923	Andrew Hicks	United Farmers
16th	1923–1926	Nelson William Trewartha	Conservative
17th	1926–1929	William George Medd	Progressive
18th	1929–1934	William George Medd	Progressive
Riding dissolved into Huron

== Election results ==
1929 Ontario general election
Party	Candidate	Votes	%	±%
Progressive	William George Medd	4,785	50.17	–7.77
Conservative	George Henry Elliott	4,753	49.83	+7.77
Total valid votes		9,538	99.42	
Total rejected ballots		56	0.58	–0.07
Turnout		9,594	66.20	–6.65
Eligible voters		14,492		
Progressive hold		Swing		–7.77
Source: Elections Ontario

1926 Ontario general election
Party	Candidate	Votes	%	±%
Progressive	William George Medd	6,003	57.93	+24.08
Conservative	Alexander H. Neeb	4,359	42.07	+1.96
Total valid votes		10,362	99.35	
Total rejected ballots		68	0.65	+0.22
Turnout		10,430	72.86	+3.56
Eligible voters		14,316		
Progressive gain from Conservative		Swing		–
Source: Elections Ontario

1923 Ontario general election
Party	Candidate	Votes	%	±%
Conservative	Nelson William Trewartha	2,800	40.11	+8.03
United Farmers	William George Medd	2,363	33.85	–8.06
Liberal	Daniel F. McGregor	1,818	26.04	+0.03
Total valid votes		6,981	99.57	
Total rejected ballots		30	0.43	–2.82
Turnout		7,011	69.29	–11.59
Eligible voters		10,118		
Conservative gain from United Farmers		Swing		+8.05
Source: Elections Ontario

1919 Ontario general election
Party	Candidate	Votes	%	±%
United Farmers	Andrew Hicks	3,298	41.91	–
Conservative	Frederick H. Ellerington	2,524	32.08	–21.98
Liberal	John T. Morgan	2,047	26.01	–19.93
Total valid votes		7,869	96.75	
Total rejected ballots		264	3.25	+2.95
Turnout		8,133	80.89	–11.89
Eligible voters		10,055		
United Farmers gain from Conservative		Swing		+9.97
Source: Elections Ontario

1914 Ontario general election
Party	Candidate	Votes	%	±%
Conservative	Henry Eilber	2,159	54.06	+0.77
Liberal	Edmund Zellar	1,835	45.94	–0.77
Total valid votes		3,994	99.70	
Total rejected ballots		12	0.30	+0.11
Turnout		4,006	92.77	+10.07
Eligible voters		4,318		
Conservative hold		Swing		+0.77
Source: Elections Ontario

1911 Ontario general election
Party	Candidate	Votes	%	±%
Conservative	Henry Eilber	2,261	53.29	–1.12
Liberal	Edmund Zellar	1,982	46.71	+1.12
Total valid votes		4,243	99.81	
Total rejected ballots		8	0.19	–0.09
Turnout		4,251	82.70	–7.26
Eligible voters		5,140		
Conservative hold		Swing		–1.12
Source: Elections Ontario

1908 Ontario general election
Party	Candidate	Votes	%	±%
Conservative	Henry Eilber	2,365	54.41	+0.27
Liberal	Jacob Kellerman	1,982	45.59	–0.27
Total valid votes		4,347	99.72	
Total rejected ballots		12	0.28	–0.05
Turnout		4,359	89.97	+1.37
Eligible voters		4,845		
Conservative hold		Swing		+0.27
Source: Elections Ontario

1905 Ontario general election
Party	Candidate	Votes	%	±%
Conservative	Henry Eilber	2,688	54.14	+3.60
Liberal	M. C. McLennan	2,277	45.86	–3.60
Total valid votes		4,965	99.68	
Total rejected ballots		16	0.32	–1.04
Turnout		4,981	88.60	+5.16
Eligible voters		5,622		
Conservative hold		Swing		+3.60
Source: Elections Ontario

1902 Ontario general election
Party	Candidate	Votes	%	±%
Conservative	Henry Eilber	2,497	50.54	–0.94
Liberal	Murdo Young McLean	2,444	49.46	+0.94
Total valid votes		4,941	98.64	
Total rejected ballots		68	1.36	+0.73
Turnout		5,009	83.44	–2.70
Eligible voters		6,003		
Conservative hold		Swing		–0.94
Source: Elections Ontario

1898 Ontario general election
Party	Candidate	Votes	%	±%
Conservative	Henry Eilber	2,775	51.47	+1.71
Liberal	Murdo Young McLean	2,616	48.53	–1.71
Total valid votes		5,391	99.37	
Total rejected ballots		34	0.63	+0.22
Turnout		5,425	86.14	+7.10
Eligible voters		6,298		
Conservative gain from Liberal		Swing		+1.71
Source: Elections Ontario

1894 Ontario general election
Party	Candidate	Votes	%	±%
Liberal	Murdo Young McLean	2,335	50.24	–1.68
Conservative	E. Weismiller	2,313	49.76	+1.68
Total valid votes		4,648	99.59	
Total rejected ballots		19	0.41	–0.43
Turnout		4,667	79.03	+10.80
Eligible voters		5,905		
Liberal hold		Swing		–1.68
Source: Elections Ontario

1890 Ontario general election
Party	Candidate	Votes	%	±%
Liberal	Archibald Bishop	2,144	51.91	–4.24
Conservative	J. G. Holmes	1,986	48.09	+4.24
Total valid votes		4,130	99.16	
Total rejected ballots		35	0.84	+0.12
Turnout		4,165	68.23	+1.79
Eligible voters		6,104		
Liberal hold		Swing		–4.24
Source: Elections Ontario

1886 Ontario general election
Party	Candidate	Votes	%	±%
Liberal	Archibald Bishop	2,313	56.15	+4.41
Conservative	J. Swenerton	1,806	43.85	–4.41
Total valid votes		4,119	99.28	
Total rejected ballots		30	0.72	–0.14
Turnout		4,149	66.45	–4.62
Eligible voters		6,244		
Liberal hold		Swing		+4.41
Source: Elections Ontario

1883 Ontario general election
Party	Candidate	Votes	%	±%
Liberal	Archibald Bishop	1,962	51.74	–0.47
Conservative	Mr. Jackson	1,830	48.26	+0.47
Total valid votes		3,792	99.14	
Total rejected ballots		33	0.86	+0.86
Turnout		3,825	71.07	+0.32
Eligible voters		5,382		
Liberal hold		Swing		–0.47
Source: Elections Ontario

1879 Ontario general election
Party	Candidate	Votes	%	±%
Liberal	Archibald Bishop	1,893	52.21	+0.81
Conservative	Mr. Jackson	1,733	47.79	−0.81
Total valid votes		3,626	70.75	−1.78
Eligible voters		5,125		
Liberal hold		Swing		+0.81
Source: Elections Ontario

1875 Ontario general election
Party	Candidate	Votes	%	±%
Liberal	Archibald Bishop	1,440	51.39	+1.14
Conservative	G. Case	1,362	48.61	−1.14
Turnout		2,802	72.53	
Eligible voters		3,863		
Liberal hold		Swing		+1.14
Source: Elections Ontario

Ontario provincial by-election, October 1873 Resignation of Robert Gibbons
Party	Candidate	Votes	%	±%
Liberal	Archibald Bishop	1,424	50.25	−3.30
Conservative	G. Case	1,410	49.75	+3.30
Total valid votes		2,834	100.0	−2.78
Liberal hold		Swing		−3.30
Source: History of the Electoral Districts, Legislatures and Ministries of the Province of Ontario

1871 Ontario general election
Party	Candidate	Votes	%	±%
Liberal	Robert Gibbons	1,561	53.55	+3.39
Conservative	Isaac Carling	1,354	46.45	−3.39
Turnout		2,915	71.64	−10.36
Eligible voters		4,069		
Liberal hold		Swing		+3.39
Source: Elections Ontario

1867 Ontario general election
Party	Candidate	Votes	%
Liberal	Robert Gibbons	1,558	50.16
Conservative	Isaac Carling	1,548	49.84
Total valid votes		3,106	82.00
Eligible voters		3,788	
Liberal pickup new district.			
Source: Elections Ontario
