= Hay Swamp =

Wetland complex in Ontario, Canada

Coordinates: 43.366935°N 81.556063°W

Hay Swamp (Hay Swamp Management Area) is a provincially significant wetland complex, 1839 hectares (4544 acres) in size, located in parts of the central land areas of the municipalities of Bluewater and South Huron, in southwestern Ontario, Canada. Approximately 13 kilometres (8.1 mi) in length and 2 kilometres (1.2 mi) in width, at its widest point; it consists of 15 extensively forested individual wetlands, situated on either side, of sections of both the upper drainage of the Ausable River and its tributary, Black Creek.

Hay Swamp is situated at the northern limit of the Carolinian Biotic Province and is categorized as consisting of 98% swamp and 2% marshland. Apart from the Ausable and the Black, its primary source of water is considered to be the local Wyoming Moraine aquifer. Hay Swamp is an important regional habitat for wildlife populations including white-tailed deer, great blue heron, ducks, geese, as well as a significant beaver presence. The swamp is also home to several plant species at risk, including green dragon and Riddell's goldenrod. Endangered fish and mussel species present in Hay Swamp include, eastern sand darter, greenside darter, northern riffleshell, snuffbox, wavy-rayed lampmussel, rainbow mussel and kidneyshell.

Historic logging operations, as well as continuing intensive drainage practices to obtain access to the rich underlying organic soils of the swamp, have affected its overall size and health as a natural habitat. Since the Ausable River only partially drains the swamp on an ongoing basis, Hay Swamp acts as a natural water 'storage basin', guarding against large-scale flooding in other areas downstream and helping to maintain and moderate baseflow conditions during the summer months. By doing so it improves both the overall water quality in the Ausable system and aids local fish, bird and wildlife populations during the times of the year when water sources that are available for local wildlife are at a premium. The swamp contains several sites of abandoned 19th and early 20th century farms, including the location of the former community of Sodom. Hay Swamp (Hay Swamp Management Area) is administered by the Ausable Bayfield Conservation Authority.
