= London, Huron and Bruce Railway =

Overview
- Headquarters: Ilderton
- Reporting mark: LH&BR
- Locale: Ontario, Canada
- Dates of operation: 1876–merged into GWR in 1893, into CNR in 1923, short section remains in service by Goderich-Exeter Railway

Technical
- Track gauge: 4 ft 8 1/2 in (1,435 mm) standard gauge

The London, Huron and Bruce Railway (LH&BR) was a short line railway in Ontario, Canada. It started in London, Ontario, running northward for 70 miles (110 km) to the small town of Wingham. It originally planned to continue north to Southampton or Kincardine, but instead joined the Wellington, Grey and Bruce Railway (WG&BR) at Wingham. The route was primarily used for farm shipments, and was nicknamed the "Butter and Egg Special", while passengers complaining about the rough ride constructed the backronym "Let 'er Hit and Bounce".

The line started and ended on lines operated by the Great Western Railway (Ontario) (GWR), and the route and construction was supervised by that company. Construction began in early 1875 and completed by the end of the year, officially opening for passenger traffic in January 1876. In 1882, the line fell under the control of the Grand Trunk Railway (GTR) as part of their purchase of the GWR, and its original name disappeared as part of the 1 April 1893 GTR amalgamation.

GTR's 1918 bankruptcy and subsequent reformation as part of Canadian National Railways (CNR) led to the line becoming the Exeter Subdivision. The central section was abandoned in 1941, leaving the 7.5 miles (12.1 km) portion from London to Ilderton at the south end of the route as the Ilderton Spur. The northern section from Clinton to a grain silo in Centralia retained the Exeter name. The Ilderton Spur was abandoned in 1988, and the Exeter Sub was purchased in 1990 by RailTex, who continues operation as part of their Goderich-Exeter Railway.

== History ==
=== Origins ===
One of the main promoters of the LH&BR was Patrick Kelly, a reeve who operated a sawmill and factory at Blyth, about 60 miles (97 km) north of London. At that time the closest railway was the Buffalo and Lake Huron Railway (B&LH) at Clinton, some 11 miles (18 km) away and only reachable by wagon, making export unprofitable. The B&LH had no need to run through Blyth, so Kelly began discussions with businessmen in London, pitching them the idea of opening up the vast agricultural areas north of the city, as well as potentially capturing some of the laker trade on the upper Great Lakes.

Kelly was able to interest a number of London businessmen in the idea, including John Carling and his brother William, sons of Thomas Carling, founder of the Carling brewery. On 22 November 1880 a meeting was held in London, Ontario to judge interest in the idea of a line running through the farms north of the city and then on to a port on Lake Huron. Having seen the town's fortunes improve with the arrival of the Great Western Railway (GWR) in 1854, the proposal had strong support. The company was incorporated on 15 February 1871, with the charter proposal having two options for the northern end at either Southampton or Kincardine. Given the short route, and the lower cost of construction, a narrow gauge line was initially considered.

When it was learned that the Wellington, Grey and Bruce Railway (WG&BR) would be building branches to both of these port towns, the plans changed to meet the WG&BR on its southern branch, running to Kincardine. The actual meeting point was not selected, although it would be somewhere in Stanley or Tuckersmith townships in Huron County.

=== GWR involvement ===
Further progress proved difficult. The directors knew they were unqualified to plan and build the line themselves, so they first approached the Grand Trunk Railway (GTR), who at that time were building a new route to Sarnia to the north of London. The GTR proved uninterested, so the group next approached the GWR, which was helped due to John Carling being a member of the GWR board. The GWR was interested in the idea, but were concerned that the line might draw traffic off the Wellington, Grey and Bruce, which they had recently leased. They proposed ending the line at Blyth.

At the time there was a basic formula used for fundraising, where townships along the route would buy shares in the company and then have them matched approximately 50% by the provincial government. The eventual subscriptions came to $311,500, leading to a payment of $178,630 from the government. A significant amount of the subscriptions came from townships on the northern end of the route, including Wingham and Kincardine, so the longer route to Wingham was eventually approved.

Biddulph Township, and the town of Lucan within it, dithered on whether to fund the line. Situated just north of Ilderton, they were originally part of the surveyed route. But intense competition between the GTR and the GWR led the GTR to begin their Sarnia line, which passed through Lucan. The locals argued that there was no need to put up more money for another line.

After repeatedly trying to get the township on-side, Lucan eventually decided to raise funds themselves. But as the process dragged on into 1873, the GWR gave up and moved the line 2 miles (3.2 km) to the west. Bypassing the township produced the long, gentle curve to the west, north of Ilderton. Lucan realized this was a problem, and 10 years later offered $18,000 to anyone that would build a spur to the LH&BR, without success.

=== Construction ===
Construction finally began in early 1875, with the last spike driven at Wingham on 11 December 1875. Minor improvements were required, and the line opened for freight on 31 December 1875. The official opening train travelled from London to Wingham and back on 12 January 1876, meeting with great fanfare at the towns along the route. Passenger service opened on 17 January. (Note: Other sources say 4 January.) Built to the exacting standards of the GWR's later work, the line was well built and came in on budget, rare for that era.

The route was used primarily for shipping agricultural products, which gave it the nickname the "Butter and Egg Special". This proved rather profitable, and in 1879 it was stated that "the London-Huron&Bruce, in proportion to its length (74 miles) is the best paying road in the Dominion of Canada". Passengers were not so impressed, and called it the "Let 'er Hit and Bounce", a play on its acronym, LH&B.

=== Changing hands ===
The line operated under the GWR lease until August 1892, when the Grand Trunk Railway's (GTR) hostile takeover of the Great Western occurred. It remained nominally independent within the GTR until 1 April 1893, when the GTR amalgamated its operating companies in Ontario. This became part of Canadian National Railways (CNR) in 1923 when they assumed control of the now-bankrupt GTR. CNR continued operation of the line as their Exeter Subdivision.

=== Abandonment ===
Lower rates of train travel, especially during the Great Depression, led to losses on what had previously been a very profitable line; in 1939 the line lost $9,000. In December 1940, CNR informed the towns along the northern section of the line that they would be abandoning the 24 miles (39 km) section between Clinton and Wingham, which included the section through Blyth. In spite of protests, a last ceremonial passenger train ran on 26 April 1941, an event that was widely covered in the local papers. Passenger service along the rest of the line ended in April 1956.

In December 1987, the company applied for permission to abandon the section between Ilderton to Centralia, closing the section in 1988 and lifting the rails the next year. By 1 June 1989 the section was gone, with the metal shipped to a smelter in Pennsylvania.

The short section between Hyde Park and Ilderton remained in use, as the Ilderton Subdivision, especially to service the collection of lumberyards at Ontario Highway 22, a short distance north of the wye in Hyde Park. The section south from Clinton to Centrailia also remained in service, retaining the original Exeter Subdivision name. This section was purchased by the Goderich-Exeter Railway, who continues to operate it as the Exeter Subdivision. The Ilderton Sub was abandoned some time in the early 1990s. (Note: None of the available sources state when this was abandoned, but Google satellite images show several relatively new houses have been built on the right-of-way south of Ilderton, and the sections closer to town have been paved as a trail.)

== Route ==
From the Ontario Railway Map Collection, unless otherwise noted.

The LH&BR officially starts at the former GWR station in downtown London, a length of 75 miles (121 km) to Wingham Junction. However, the physical line starts at Hyde Park, a short distance west of London and now on the edge of its extended subdivisions. Measured from this point, the line is 69.75 miles (112.25 km).

From Hyde Park it runs north-northwest through Ilderton, Denfield and just west of Clandeboye. From there it turns more northward, running perfectly straight through Exeter (which gave it its later name), Hensall and Clinton. The land north of Clinton is somewhat hilly, and the line begins a somewhat more wandering route to the northeast, through Blyth and Belgrave before ending at Wingham Junction, just southeast of Wingham.

There were two major connections, with the Buffalo and Lake Huron at Clinton, and the Wellington Grey and Bruce at Wingham Junction. It crosses the Guelph and Goderich Railway and the Grand Trunk Railway mainline to Sarnia, but did not connect with these. There were also two major spurs, one servicing a quarry a short distance north of Hyde Park, and much later, one servicing RCAF Station Centralia during World War II. (Note: It also passed just west of CFB Clinton, but photographs of the area do not seem to show a spur.)

== See also ==
- List of Ontario railways
