= Wellington, Grey and Bruce Railway =

Railway in Ontario, Canada

Overview
- Headquarters: Guelph, Ontario
- Reporting mark: WG&BR
- Locale: Ontario, Canada
- Dates of operation: 1867–1995, as part of CNR
- Successor: Canadian National Railways

Technical
- Track gauge: 4 ft 8 1/2 in (1,435 mm) standard gauge after 1873
- Previous gauge: 5 ft 6 in (1,676 mm) until 1873
- Length: 101 miles (163 km) main, 66 miles (106 km) branch

The Wellington, Grey and Bruce Railway (WG&BR) was a railway in Ontario, Canada. It ran roughly northwest from Guelph (in Wellington County) to the port town of Southampton (in Bruce County) on Lake Huron, a distance of 101 miles (163 km). It also had a 66-mile (106 km) branch line splitting off at Palmerston and running roughly westward to Kincardine, another port town. A branch running south from Southampton was built during the construction of the Bruce Nuclear Generating Station in the 1970s.

The line was originally chartered in 1856 as the Canada North-West Railway with the intention of running from Toronto to Southampton and thereby offering a more direct route to the upper Great Lakes than the Ontario, Simcoe and Huron. Options included branches to Owen Sound and a connection with the Great Western Railway's line in Guelph. The original charter lapsed in 1861, but was amended with the new name in 1864, this time with provisions to use the GWR's line for access to Toronto, and the possibility of merging with the GWR.

Construction began using Provincial gauge in June 1867, but at this point the Toronto, Grey and Bruce Railway (TG&B) chartered with a route running north of the WG&BR to Owen Sound and a branch to Kincardine, and the two began competing for funding. The GWR took a lease on the line in June 1869, and the plans were amended with their own branch to Kincardine that year. Construction of the mainline to Southampton was complete in December 1872. The Kincardine branch was completed in November 1873, beating the TG&B, but it sat unused until December 1874 due to overdue payments. Around this time it was re-gauged to standard gauge.

The line was a major part of the GWR's network in western Ontario, and became part of the Grand Trunk Railway (GTR) after their 1882 merger. In 1893, the GTR merged their local operating companies and the WG&BR officially disappeared. The Grand Trunk's bankruptcy and subsequent takeover by the Canadian National Railway (CNR) in 1923 led to the lines being reorganized into various subdivisions. They began abandoning the eastern sections starting in 1983, routing traffic on the Stratford and Huron Railway, with the final section on the Kincardine branch remaining in use until 1995.

== History ==
=== Canada North-West Railway ===
Although plans for railways in Ontario date into the 1830s, the first real efforts began in the 1850s with construction on the Great Western Railway (GWR) running west from Hamilton to Windsor and what became the Northern Railway of Canada (NRC) running north out of Toronto to Barrie.

Counties to the north and west of these lines, especially the port towns on Lake Huron and Georgian Bay, clamored for connections, but by the time the Northern had reached Collingwood they were uninterested in service further west. As the need for rail service grew, the counties and townships in the area began to organize their own operating companies to serve these markets.

In May 1856, the year after the Northern reached Collingwood, the Canada North-West Railway Company was formed to build a line running roughly northwest from Toronto to Southampton, with various options for Owen Sound and other points. Sandford Fleming carried out a preliminary survey, but little else was done as there was little investment money to be found. The charter lapsed in 1861.

=== Wellington, Grey and Bruce Railway ===
In 1864, Francis Shanly led the effort to get things moving again. The opening of the Great Western line to Toronto in 1855 made their own line to the city unnecessary, and the company rechartered with the specific intent of starting at the Great Western in Guelph instead. The new name indicated the three counties that would be part of its route. The route would run out of Guelph to Fergus, and from there two routes were considered, a southern route running through Palmerston and a northern one running through Arthur, both running to Walkerton. Here, the line would split with one line running northward to Southampton and the other westward to Kincardine. A branch to Listowel was also considered.

Work began with a sod turning in Fergus on 28 June 1867, running west through Elora and reaching Alma by the end of 1870. In June 1869, the Great Western took over physical operations of the line. Meanwhile, the southern section from Fergus to Guelph began construction, reaching Guelph in 1870. That same year, the charter was amended to switch from Provincial gauge to standard gauge, adding an extension to Kincardine, and opening the possibility of a lease to the Great Western. The line reached Harriston, 49 miles (79 km) from Fergus, in October 1871, Paisley in June 1872, and Southampton on 7 December 1872.

Before the line reached Southampton, work on the branch to Kincardine began. This was a "subscriber's route", selected based on the subscriptions raised by the various levels of governments. As a result, this path is somewhat circuitous, running south from Palmerson along Mitchell Road, then turning northwest at Atwood to Brussels and then roughly northwest for Kincardine. Sod was turned at Palmerston on 17 December 1871, opening to Listowel on 19 December 1872, and reaching Kincardine in November 1873. However, the company had run out of funds by this point, and due to non-payment clauses with the contractor, the company was not allowed to begin service on the line until these were paid. The line finally opened on 29 December 1874.

A lack of funds precluded further development, and the plans to reach Owen Sound from Kincardine, which would also connect at Southampton, along with a shorter line from Clifford to Durham were both dropped. The WG&BR's lack of further building was exploited by a number of other companies that formed while it was under construction. Notable among these was the Toronto, Grey and Bruce Railway (TG&B), which formed in 1868 to run a narrow gauge line to Southampton with branches to Kincardine and Owen Sound. The WG&BR beat them to Kincardine, so they realigned on the Owen Sound branch and abandoned work on their own Kincardine branch in Teeswater.

Other lines in the area included the Guelph and Goderich Railway, Buffalo and Lake Huron Railway, the Port Dover and Lake Huron Railway and the Georgian Bay and Wellington Railway, as well as a number of smaller lines like the Stratford and Huron Railway, London, Huron and Bruce Railway and Walkerton and Lucknow Railway. By the turn of the 20th century, most of these had been bought up by either the Canadian National or Canadian Pacific Railway, leaving the area well covered by rail transit.

=== Takeover, abandonment ===
A traffic sharing agreement was signed with the Great Western in 1873, and they purchased the company's bonds in 1876. In 1882, the Grand Trunk Railway merged with the Great Western, at which point the president of the Grand Trunk, Henry Whatley Tyler, noted "the old Wellington, Grey and Bruce did not do well for the Great Western and is not doing well for us."

In 1893, the Grand Trunk amalgamated all its operating companies and the Wellington, Grey and Bruce officially disappeared. As part of the Grand Trunk's 1918 bankruptcy, in 1923 the lines became part of the newly formed Canadian National Railway (CNR). CNR reorganized their lines into subdivisions, with the WG&BR lines becoming parts of the Fergus, Owen Sound and Southampton Subdivisions.

In 1970, CNR began construction of the Douglas Point Spur, running south from Southampton to the new Bruce Nuclear Generating Station that was under construction. The plant is slightly closer to Kincardine than Southampton, but the land south of Southampton is swampy and the line was able to skirt this through relatively undeveloped areas. The line was complete in 1971 and ultimately abandoned in 1988.

The section of the mainline from Fergus to Palmerston was abandoned in August 1983, along with a major section of the Kincardine branch from Kincardine to Wingham. The now disconnected remaining western sections were connected to the CNR mainline via the Stratford and Huron at Listowel. The remainder of the Southampton branch from Harriston to Southampton was abandoned in 1988, along with the short remaining section on the eastern end from Fergus to Guelph. The remaining part of the Kincardine branch from Listowel to Wingham was abandoned in 1991, leaving only the short section between Palmerston and Harriston, which was abandoned in 1995.

=== Legacy ===
After being abandoned, parts of the railway route were re-purposed. The section from Southampton to Port Elgin is part of the Saugeen Rail Trail, and the section from Port Elgin to Kincardine is part of the Bruce County Rail Trail.

== Route ==
Unless otherwise noted, the following is taken from the Southern Ontario Railway Map

Starting from the Grand Trunk Railway line at Guelph Junction on the west end of the city, the WG&BR begins running northwest, parallel to Edinburg Road. A short distance north of the junction, a spur split off to run north and then turn east and reverse to run southeast along the shore of Speed River into the downtown area. This spur was lifted some time after the late 1970s.

The mainline continued northwestward to a point just southwest of Elora, where it made a right-angle turn to run northeast, parallel to the main axis of the town. It ran this direction the short distance into Fergus, ending at the mill on the Grand River.

The line was extended by wyeing off on the west side of Fergus, turning sharply to run west-northwest. It ran this direction past Alma and on to Drayton, where it turned westward for a short distance to Moorefield before turning northwest again past Trecastle and into Palmerston. Palmerston was the main maintenance yard for the area, and the junction point for the spur to Kinardine.

The mainline turned north in Palmerston, running parallel to the Stratford and Huron Railway into Harriston, where the two lines crossed on the north side of town at Harriston Junction. From this point until Walkerton, the route loosely paralleled Ontario Highway 9 through Fultons, Clifford and Mildmay. At Walkerton it turned westward for a short distance and then north main through Eden Grove and into Paisley. At Paisley it turned west again before bending north and finally northwest into Port Elgin and the final run north to Southampton. A large wye in Southampton served the station downtown as well as a spur onto the docks.

The Kincardine branch wyes off in Palmerston, turning sharply to run southwest out of town. It parallels the Stratford and Huron Railway, which was only a few meters to the west. They both ran unto Listowel, where the S&H turns to run out of town to the southeast while the WG&BR continued southwest a short distance to Atwood. Here it turned northwest through Ethel and onto Brussels, turning north again for the run into Wingham. At Wingham it turns west-northwest for Lucknow, then northwest into Kincardine, ending at the marina area downtown.

Only a short distance of the original lines remain in use, running between the starting point in Guelph and the industrial areas on the northwest side of town.

== Stations ==
Fourteen stations were built on the 105 miles (169 km) main line:

- Guelph, Ontario
- Elora, Ontario
- Fergus, Ontario
- Drayton, Ontario
- Atwood, Ontario
- Palmerston, Ontario
- Harriston, Ontario
- Clifford, Ontario
- Mildmay, Ontario
- Eden Grove, Ontario
- Cargill, Ontario
- Paisley, Ontario
- Port Elgin, Ontario
- Southampton, Ontario

The 66 miles (106 km) branch line travelled northwest from Palmerston to Kincardine included 7 stations:

- Palmerston, Ontario
- Listowel, Ontario
- Brussels, Ontario
- Wingham, Ontario
- Lucknow, Ontario
- Ripley, Ontario
- Kincardine, Ontario

== See also ==
- History of rail transport in Canada
- List of Ontario railways
- Rail transport in Ontario
- Toronto, Grey and Bruce Railway
- List of defunct Canadian railways
