= Cytotaxonomy =

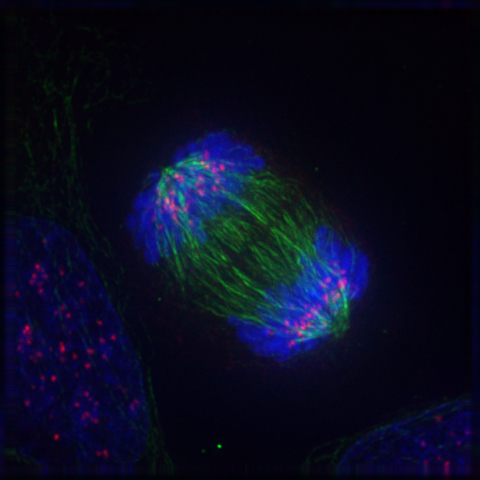
Cell in anaphase the chromosomes having split and the kinetochore microtubules shrinking

Cytotaxonomy is the classification of organisms using comparative studies of chromosomes during meiosis.

== Description ==
Cytotaxonomy is a branch of taxonomy that uses the characteristics of cellular structures to classify organisms. In cytotaxonomy, the chromosomal configuration of an organism is the most widely used parameter to infer the relationship between two organisms. The inference of species relationships is based on the assumption that closely related species share similar characteristics in their chromosomal setup (referred to as karyotype). By analysing the similarities and differences in the chromosomes, karyotype evolution and species evolution can be reconstructed.

The number, structure, and behaviour of chromosomes is of great value in taxonomy, with chromosome number being the most widely used and quoted character. Chromosome numbers are usually determined at the metaphase stage during mitosis. Usually, the diploid chromosome number (2n) is referenced, unless dealing with a polyploid series in which case the base number or number of chromosomes in the genome of the original haploid is quoted. Another useful taxonomic character is the position of the centromere. Meiotic behaviour may show the heterozygosity of inversions. This may be constant for a taxon, offering further taxonomic evidence.

Often, cytological evidence is accompanied and strengthened by other analyses, including genomics and DNA-based phylogenies.

Cytology has contributed to tracking the evolutionary history of many organisms, especially primates and flowering plants. As example, karyotype comparisons have largely clarified the evolution of Arabidopsis thaliana and of saffron crocus, though there are many more studies that deserve highlighting.
