= CKNX-FM =

Radio station in Wingham, Ontario, Canada

Coordinates: 44°05′26″N 81°12′25″W

- Wingham, Ontario; Canada
- Broadcast area: Mid-Western Ontario
- Frequency: 101.7 MHz
- Branding: 101.7 The One

Programming
- Format: Hot adult contemporary
- Affiliations: Premiere Networks

Ownership
- Owner: Blackburn Radio

History
- First air date: April 17, 1977

Technical information
- Class: C1
- ERP: 100,000 watts
- HAAT: 215 metres (705 ft)

Links
- Website: 1017theone.ca

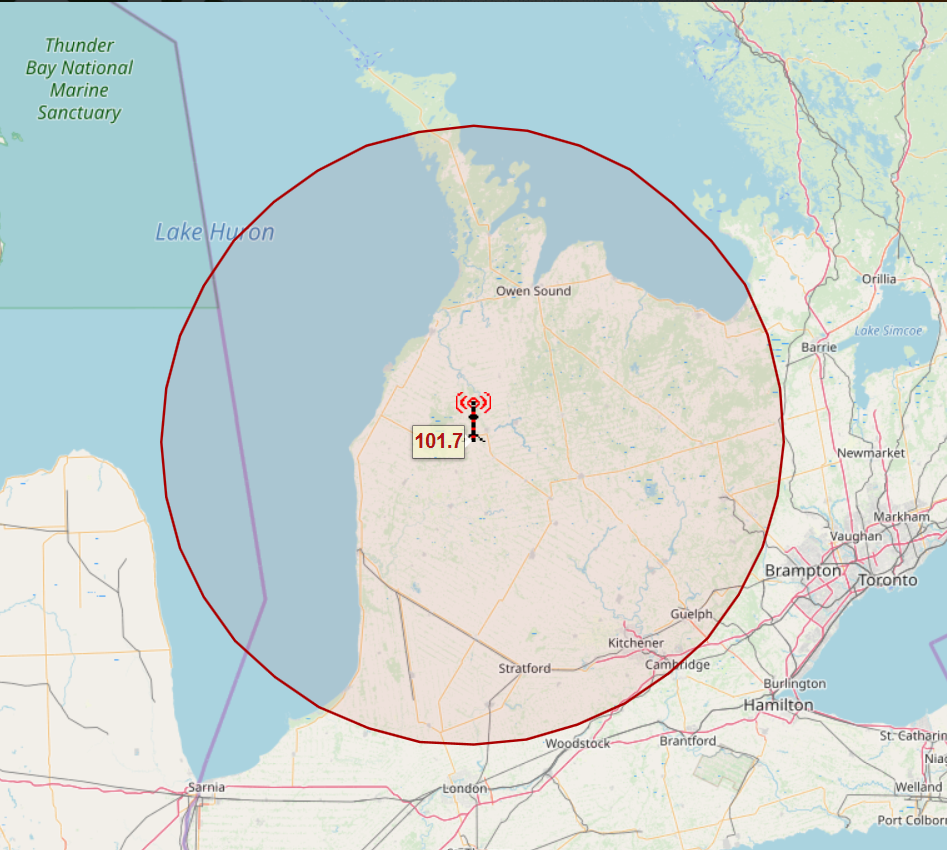
Broadcast area map for the station.

CKNX-FM is a Canadian radio station, which broadcasts at 101.7 FM in Wingham, Ontario. The station broadcasts a hot adult contemporary format as 101.7 The One. The station was formerly known as FM102 before summer 2006.

Because the station transmits at 100 kW from a tall tower in a flat region, its coverage area is exceptionally wide. Its fringe signal reaches as far north as Tobermory, as far south as St. Thomas, and as far east as Barrie.

== History ==
The station was launched on April 17, 1977 by Blackburn Radio, the owner of the city's existing CKNX 920 AM and former owner of CKNX-TV, which is now owned by Bell Media. Blackburn subsequently launched another FM station in Wingham, CIBU-FM, in 2005.

In 1987, CKNX Broadcasting Limited (CKNX Broadcasting) was denied a license to establish rebroadcasters of CKNX-FM Wingham at Owen Sound (50 watts on 103.7 MHz) and Meaford (80 watts on 105.5 MHz).

On August 29, 1989, the CRTC approved CKNX Broadcasting Limited application to establish a low-power rebroadcast FM transmitter in Centreville, on 104.9 MHz to serve Centreville and Meaford with 5 watts. The callsign for the FM repeater would become CKNX-FM-2. On August 28, 2008, Blackburn Radio applied to the CRTC to change the Centreville/Meaford frequency from 104.9 to 102.7 MHz and to increase power from 5 to 250 watts which was denied on December 2 later that same year.

In 2016, Blackburn submitted an application to the CRTC to delete CKNX-FM's repeater CKNX-FM-2.
