= Caroline Wellwood =

Canadian nurse

- Born: 1870s Fordyce, Ontario, Canada
- Died: 1947
- Occupations: Nurse, nursing educator, missionary

Caroline Wellwood (1870s – 1947) was a Canadian nurse, nursing educator, and Christian missionary in China.

== Early life ==
Caroline Wellwood was born in Fordyce, Ontario and raised in Wingham, Ontario, the daughter of William Wellwood and Christiana Rodgers Wellwood. She attended the National Training School for Nurses and Deaconesses at Sibley Memorial Hospital in Washington, D.C., graduating in 1902.

== Career ==
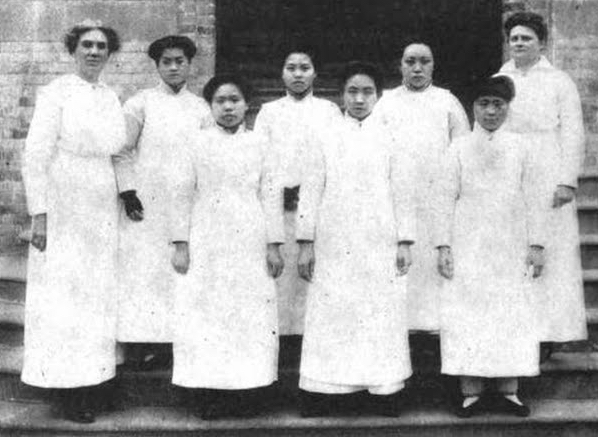
Caroline Wellwood, on the far left, with nursing students at Chengdu in 1916; her colleague Miss Smith is on the far right.

Wellwood was head nurse at a maternity hospital in Boston as a young woman. She was assigned to the West China Mission (WCM) of the Canadian Methodist Woman's Missionary Society (WMS) in 1906, and arrived at Chengdu in 1907. She worked at an orphanage while learning Mandarin, then worked at a hospital dispensary. She became secretary treasurer of the West China Mission in 1909, and hospital superintendent. She and Anna Henry, a medical doctor, began working on building a new hospital.

Wellwood was evacuated from Chengdu in 1911, and stayed in Canada until 1913, lecturing and gathering supplies and funding for the hospital she hoped to build on her return. The Hospital for Women and Children at Chengdu offered sixty beds when it opened in 1915, with Wellwood as its superintendent of nursing. She began a nurses' training program at the hospital, and a built a residence for nurses and nursing students, and translated textbooks into Mandarin for her students' use. She started a women's philanthropic club as an alternative to recreational gambling, for wealthy wives in Chengdu. She wrote about her work for American publications, and lectured again in Canada in 1921, in 1927, and in 1935.

Wellwood continued working on the hospital and school programs until a fire destroyed the hospital in 1940. She retired from the mission field in 1942. She continued giving lectures to church and women's organizations until the year of her death in 1947.

== Personal life ==
Wellwood returned to Canada in 1942, and died in 1947, aged 73 years. The Wellwood Memorial Building at West China Union University was named in her memory, and a Wellwood scholarship for nursing education was established.
