= CKNX (AM) =

Radio station in Wingham, Ontario

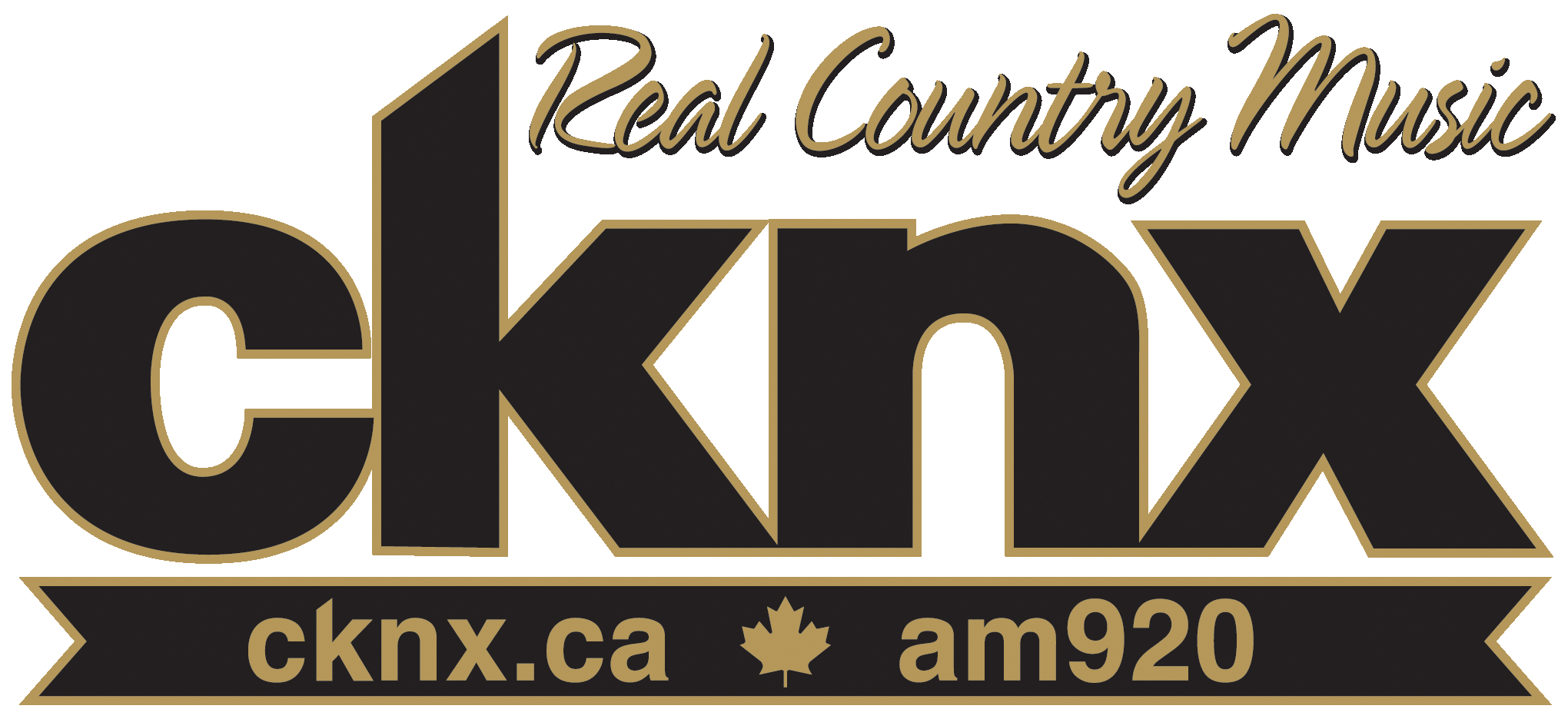
- Wingham, Ontario; Canada
- Broadcast area: Mid-Western Ontario
- Frequency: 920 kHz
- Branding: CKNX AM920

Programming
- Format: Classic country/Full service radio
- Affiliations: Toronto Blue Jays and Westwood One

Ownership
- Owner: Blackburn Radio

History
- First air date: 1926

Technical information
- Class: B
- Power: 10,000 watts day; 1,000 watts night

Links
- Website: cknx.ca

CKNX is a Canadian radio station, which broadcasts at 920 AM in Wingham, Ontario. The station broadcasts a classic country music and news format. CKNX is also an affiliate of the Toronto Blue Jays radio network.

== History ==
=== Launch ===
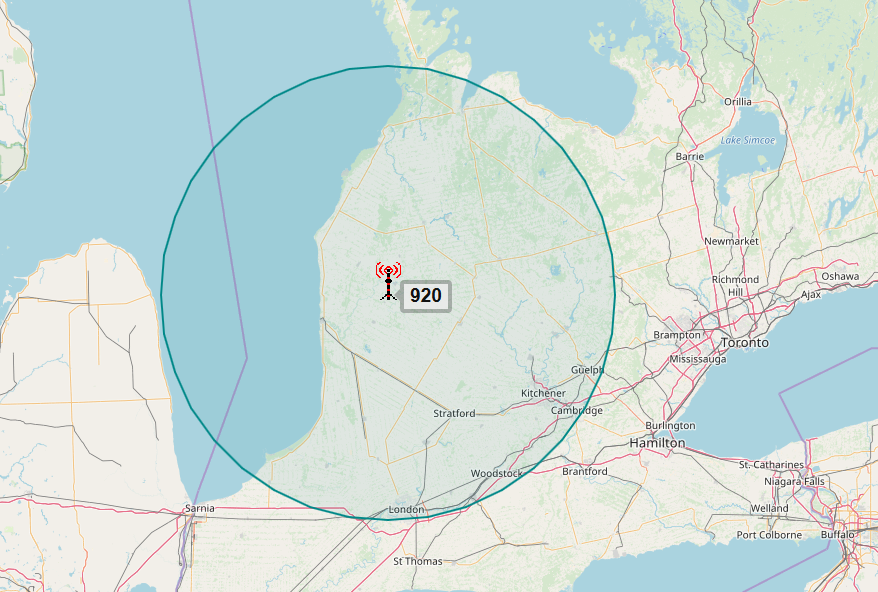
CKNX AM broadcast area map.

The station was originally launched in 1926 as an informal broadcasting experiment by local businessman W. T. Cruickshank, who aired live and unscripted programming provided by customers of his repair shop. In its original incarnation, the station was simply known as Joke, but proved so popular that Cruickshank applied for an amateur broadcasting license and the station formally became 10BP by 1930. In 1935, the station was officially licensed as commercial radio station CKNX, on 1200 AM. CKNX was affiliated with CBC Radio's Dominion Network until 1962.

=== Frequency move ===
The station briefly moved to the 1230 frequency in 1941, and to its current 920 frequency a few months later. In the late 1940s and 1950s, the station's Saturday Night Barn Dance was one of the most popular and influential radio programs in Ontario.

== CKNX-TV ==
In 1955, CKNX-TV was also launched. On March 8, 1962, the building which accommodated the CKNX radio and television stations caught fire. Although nothing could be salvaged, CKNX was back on the air within a few hours, broadcasting from temporary facilities at the transmitter site and using the nearby high school gym as a TV studio. CKNX operations continued as such (with various temporary offices set up in Wingham) until they purchased new equipment and moved into a new building in 1963.

== Acquisition ==
The stations were acquired in 1971 by Blackburn Radio, who also launched CKNX-FM in 1977. Blackburn sold the television station to Baton Broadcasting in 1993, but retains ownership of the radio stations to this day. Blackburn also launched a second FM station in Wingham, CIBU, in 2005.

== FM application ==
On May 31, 2011, Blackburn Radio applied to add a new FM transmitter at Wingham to rebroadcast the programming of CKNX at 104.3 MHz. This application was denied by the CRTC on May 10, 2013.

On March 6, 2025, Blackburn submitted an application to move CKNX 920 from the AM band to the FM band. If approved, the station would operate at 104.3 MHz with an average radiated power (ERP) of 16,700 watts (maximum ERP of 28,000 watts).
