= Wingham, Ontario =

Wingham
- Community
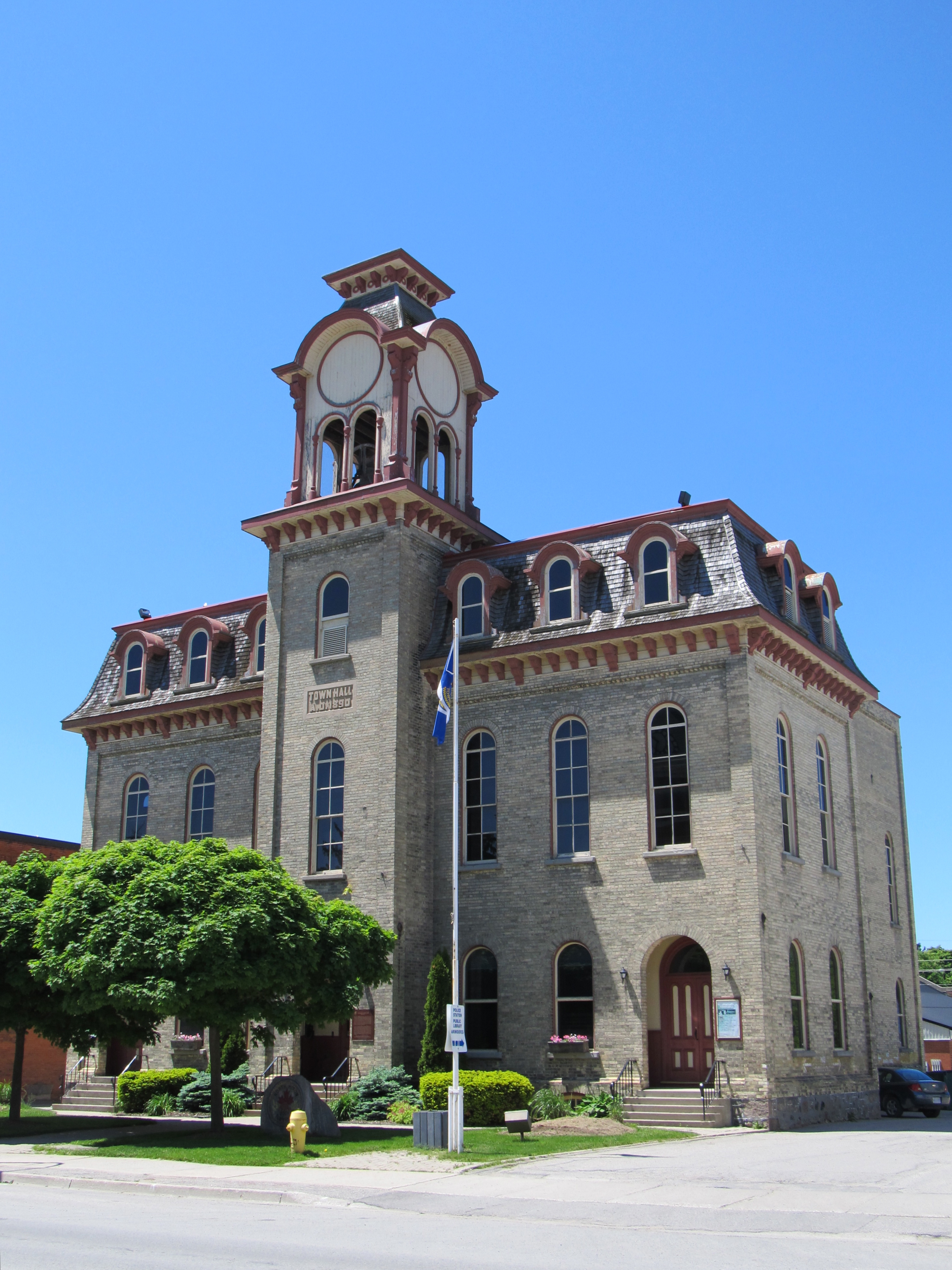
- Town hall

- Location within Huron County Location within Southern Ontario
- Coordinates: 43°53′16″N 081°18′42″W
- Country: Canada
- Province: Ontario
- County: Huron
- Municipality: North Huron
- Incorporated: 1874 (village)
- Incorporated: 1879 (town)

Area
  - Total: 2.38 km^{2} (0.92 sq mi)

Population (2016)
  - Total: 2,934
  - Density: 1,234/km^{2} (3,200/sq mi)
- Time zone: UTC-5 (Eastern (EST))
  - Summer (DST): UTC-4 (EDT)
- Postal code: N0G 2W0
- Area code: 519

Wingham (2016 census population 2,934) is a community located in the municipality of North Huron, Ontario, Canada, which is located in Huron County. Wingham became part of North Huron in 2001 when the Ontario government imposed amalgamation on the former township of East Wawanosh, the village of Blyth, and the town of Wingham.

Wingham is located at the intersection of County Roads 4 and 86. Most of Wingham is located between County Road 86 to the south and the Maitland River to the north.

== History ==
The original survey for Wingham was conducted in 1854, with 1,000 acres dedicated to the community north of what is now Highway 86 and Highway 4. The initial townsite was oriented around the Maitland River, with the assumption that its water power and transportation opportunities would make it the focal point for development. Indeed, when a basic settlement formed, it was around an early saw and shingle mill. The form of the settlement soon changed, however, when the proposed Canada North-West Railway line was surveyed to the south of the village in 1858. In anticipation of the arrival of the railway, Wingham developed into two distinct areas: an older, "stagnant" Lower Wingham which comprised the initial settlement, as well as a more dynamic Upper Wingham located near the proposed railway line. It would be over a decade until the railway finally did arrive, but in the meantime, the town had developed a number of typical pioneer industries, including a woollen mill, a tannery, and a foundry. An upper dam site was established, where a new flour mill and sawmill were constructed. During the 1860s, the main commercial thoroughfare was Victoria Street. However, the commercial centre of the settlement gradually shifted to Josephine Street by the 1870s, especially after the arrival of the Wellington, Grey and Bruce Railway in 1872.

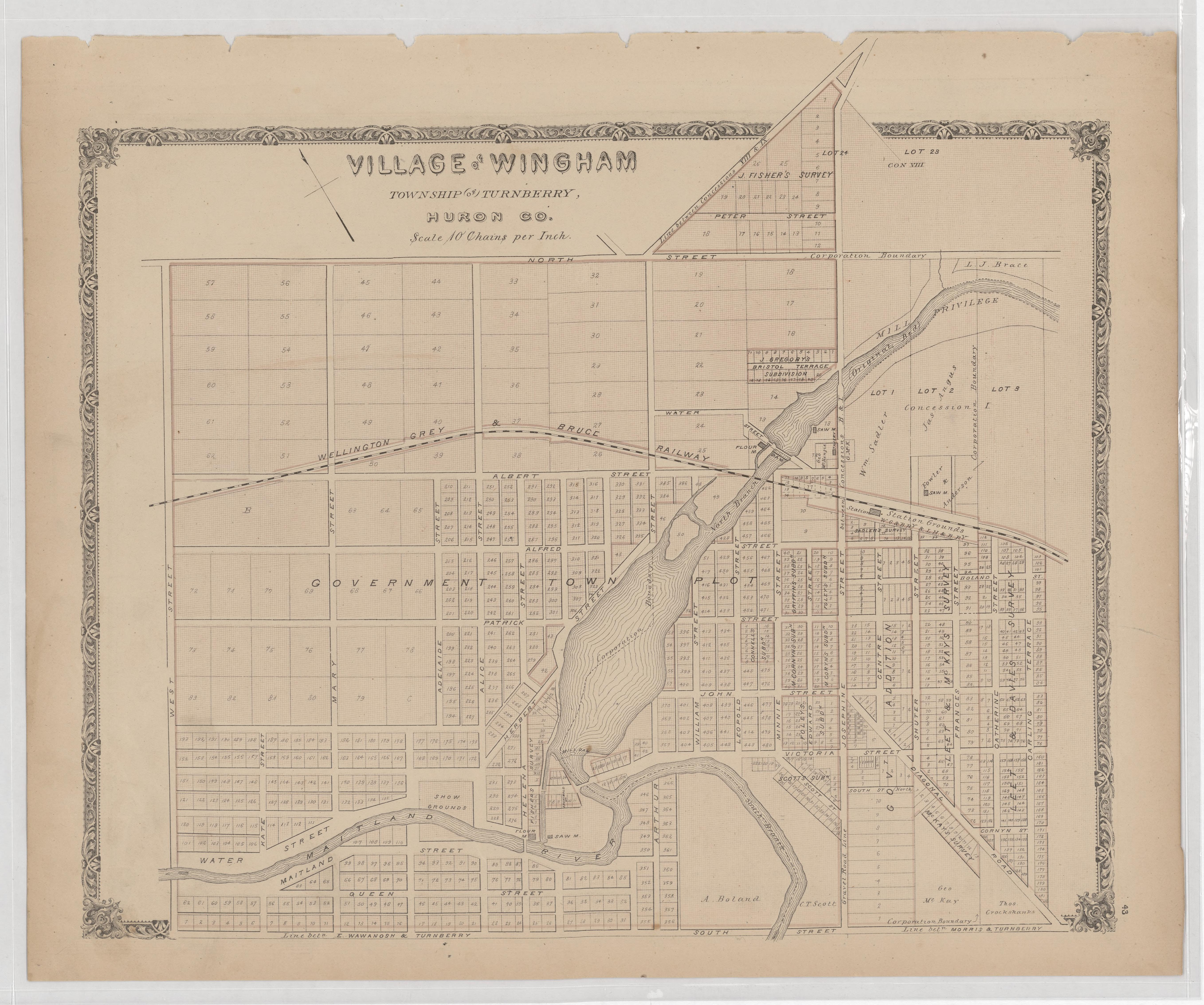
Map of the Village of Wingham, Township of Turnberry, Huron County, Ontario, Canada, H. Belden & Co., 1879

Indeed, when Wingham was incorporated as a village in 1874, its boundaries only included Upper Wingham, whose population at the time was 726; Lower Wingham, whose population was around 500, remained a part of the Township of Turnberry. The community was incorporated as a town in 1879, and the town hall was constructed and opened in 1890. The community's post office was built across the street and opened in 1907. Multiple-unit business buildings were constructed from 1878 to 1892, lining the town's main street. The community's hospital, serving Wingham and surrounding areas, dates back to 1906.

Well-known products created from Wingham businesses included:

- Hardwood chairs manufactured by Conestoga Chair Company, which opened in 1898
- Wooden doors, constructed by Lloyd-Truax. Doormaking began in Wingham in 1888 by Charles Lloyd
- Milk, processed by Sunrise Dairy, which opened in 1928

By 1910, the town's population was 2,500. Furniture manufacturing had become the town's primary export industry. This would last through much of the 20th century, with furniture, prefabricated housing, and other skilled woodworking remaining significant. There was a "brief flurry of development" in the 1950s and 1960s, and in 1981 the population stood at 2,897. The end of rail freight service to the town spelled the end for much of its woodworking industry, with many of its furniture factories closing following the end of service.

=== Railway history ===
Wingham has a "complex railway history" as noted in a Historic Sites and Monuments Board of Canada report. The first railway to arrive was the Wellington, Grey and Bruce Railway (WG&B), by then a subsidiary of the Great Western Railway. The WG&B was initially known as the Canada North-West Railway (CNWR) With work finishing up in 1871 on the WG&B mainline running between Guelph and Southampton, permission was granted for a "Southern Extension" to Kincardine, branching off from the mainline at Palmerston. This branch line would ultimately be routed through Listowel, Brussels, Wingham, Lucknow, and Ripley on its way to Kincardine. This led to the construction of Wingham's first railway station in 1872.

The second railway to arrive in Wingham was the London, Huron and Bruce Railway (LH&B) in December 1875. The LH&B was the brainchild of the first reeve of Blyth, Patrick Kelly, who promoted it heavily. It was originally intended for Blyth to be the northern terminus; however, several communities to the north, including Wingham, offered considerable subsidies for an extension, so the line was eventually terminated at a wye junction 3 kilometres (2 mi) east of Wingham. The two railways would share the original Wingham station, which functioned as a union station. Terminal facilities were built in the town after the arrival of the LH&B, which included a two-stall enginehouse, a carpenter's shop, a snowplow shed, coal facilities, and a bunkhouse.

The third and final railway to arrive was the Canadian Pacific Railway (CPR). It had taken over the Toronto, Grey and Bruce Railway, whose abortive Kincardine branch had been terminated in Teeswater in 1874 due to competition from the WG&B. In 1885, the CPR announced that a stagecoach service would connect Wingham with a point on the Teeswater line known as Glenannon (or Glenannan), where a small station was built. In 1887, Canadian Pacific built a 3.6-mile (5.8 km) spur line to Wingham from a wye connection at Glenannon, (Note: Both the Canadian Pacific junction to the northeast and the Grand Trunk junction to the southeast of the town were called "Wingham Junction" within their respective systems.) giving Wingham a direct CPR connection, along with its second railway station. The arrival of the CPR ignited a competition between it and the Grand Trunk, which renovated its existing station and maintained competitive freight rates to the town. This was followed by the construction of a new, more substantial Grand Trunk station in 1905–06. (Note: The 1906 Grand Trunk station was constructed by local builders who departed from the standard Grand Trunk "Design A" layout with the addition of two large towers, which were similar to other added towers at stations in Fergus, Mount Forest, Harriston, and Palmerston in a form of "tower competition". Grand Trunk officials rejected the towers at Wingham, which were subsequently removed.) The Grand Trunk was amalgamated into the Canadian National Railways system in 1923. The former WG&B line became known as the CN Kincardine Subdivision, while the LH&B line became known as the CN Exeter Subdivision.

In 1941, the London, Huron and Bruce line was abandoned north of Clinton Junction on the CN Goderich Subdivision, cutting off Wingham's southern connection to London. CN passenger service to the town ended in 1973. This was soon followed by the end of activity on the Canadian Pacific line, which was built with lightweight rail and had suffered washouts in the 1950s; the last CP freight customer, Wingham's Premium Forest Products, switched to CN in 1983 after CP built an industrial spur to connect it to CN's Kincardine Subdivision. In the same year, CN abandoned the section of its only remaining line from Wingham to Kincardine, leaving Wingham as the terminus. The Canadian Pacific line was finally formally abandoned in 1988, and the CN line was abandoned in 1991, almost 120 years after it had first arrived and transformed the area.

== Business and industry ==
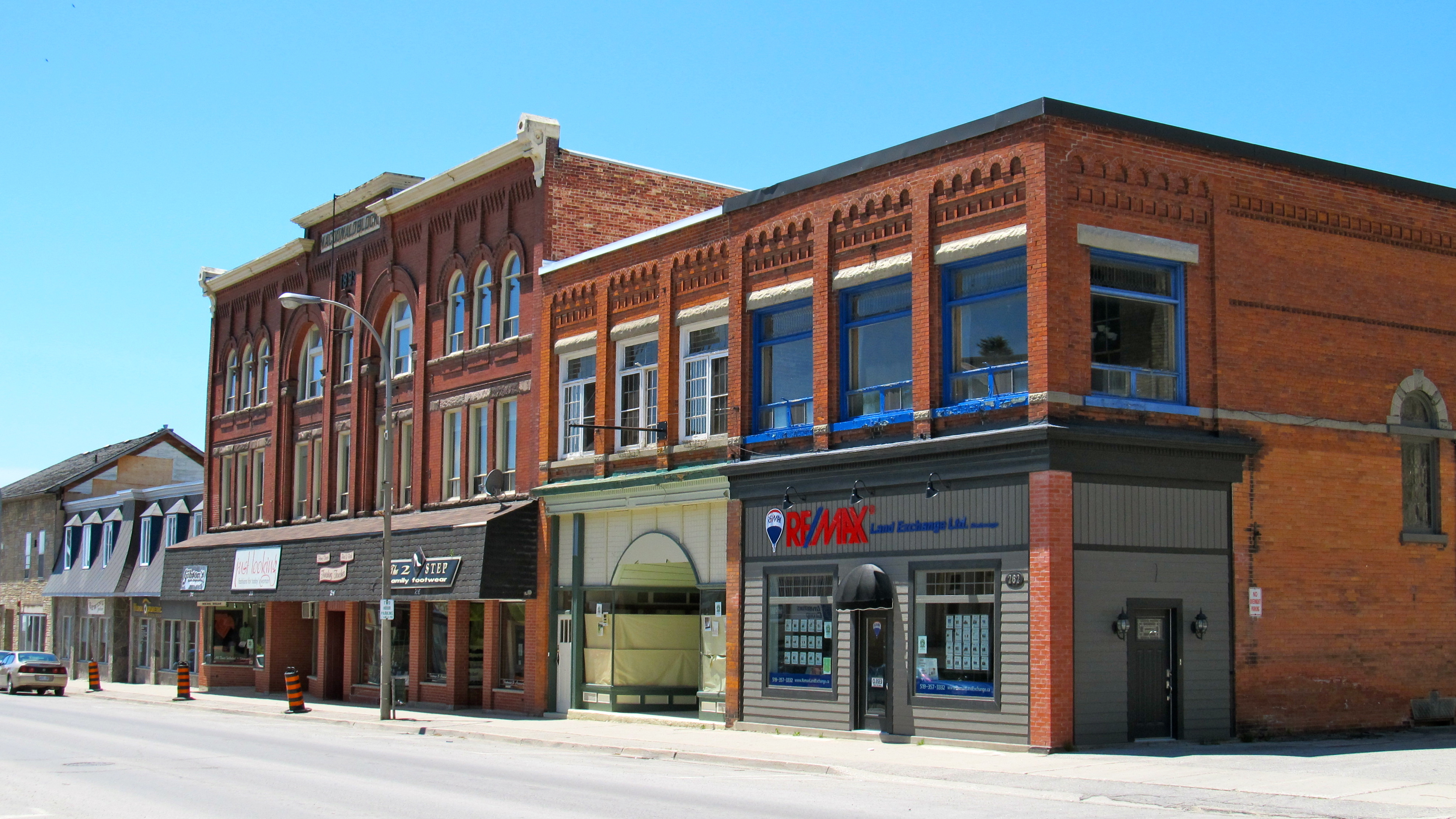
Josephine Street

Wingham has a number of manufacturing businesses, and a variety of retail and service businesses. Wingham supports two grocery stores, and a main street with retail stores and restaurants. The town has branches of the Bank of Montreal, CIBC, and TD Canada Trust banks, and a branch of Libro Financial Group credit union.

The industries with a presence in the town include:

- Wescast Industries, three manufacturing facilities for this auto-part producer.
- BI-AX International produces plastic film for use in food packaging and industry.
- Royal Homes is a manufacturer of pre-fabricated homes.
- Britespan Building Systems Inc. is a manufacturer of fabric covered steel structure buildings.

== Radio and television ==
Wingham was one of the first towns in Ontario to have a community radio station, with W.T. Cruickshank founding CKNX Broadcasting Ltd in 1926.

Wingham has three radio stations: CKNX 920, CKNX-FM 101.7, and Classic Rock 94.5, all owned by Blackburn Radio. There is also a television station CKNX channel 8, owned by CTVglobemedia. It rebroadcasts the master signal of CFPL-TV from London, with the exception of local advertising. CKNX became a rebroadcaster of CFPL London on August 31, 2009.

On April 9, 2007, it was announced that Rogers Communications had filed with the Canadian Radio-television and Telecommunications Commission to purchase all of the A-Channel stations, including CFPL, CKNX, CKX-TV, Access Alberta and several cable channels that were for sale by CHUM Limited in the wake of CTVglobemedia's acquisition of the CHUM group. CTV said it would not renew the licence for CKNX-TV in Wingham upon expiration at the end of August 2009. On May 1, 2009, Shaw Communications offered to buy the station for $1 from CTV (along with other underperforming stations in Brandon and Windsor), but scuttled the deal two months later. CKNX closed down as a separate station on August 31, 2009. Its transmitter remains in operation as an analogue rebroadcaster of CFPL-DT in London.

Wingham was also served by a CBC English TV station (Channel 45), which re-transmitted CBLT-TV Toronto via CBLN-TV London. This transmitter, along with CBC/Radio-Canada's other remaining analog transmitters, was shut down permanently on July 31, 2012, leaving over-the-air viewers in the area with no free CBC television service.

== Education ==
Public education is managed by the Avon Maitland District School Board, which oversees the following schools:

- F. E. Madill Secondary School is located in Wingham. Approximately 800 students from grades 7-12 attend; most are bused in from the surrounding area. Madill is known for its Basketball teams and its Track and Field team.
- Maitland River Elementary School is located in Wingham beside F.E. Madill Secondary School. Approximately 400-500 students attend from Junior Kindergarten to Grade 6.

The former Wingham Public School educated thousands of children on John Street, but was closed in 2013.

Catholic education is managed by the Huron-Perth Catholic District School Board. It has one elementary school, Sacred Heart School, located in the town's east end.

== Transportation ==
Wingham is located to the north of County Road 86 which connects to Kitchener-Waterloo to the east. The main thoroughfare is County Road 4, called Josephine Street within Wingham, which connects to London, Ontario to the south.

Wingham/Richard W. LeVan Aerodrome is a general aviation airport to the southeast of Wingham with fuel services and private hangars.

Wingham was served by scheduled bus service to London, Owen Sound, and Stratford until 2013, when provider Aboutown entered receivership.

== Attractions ==
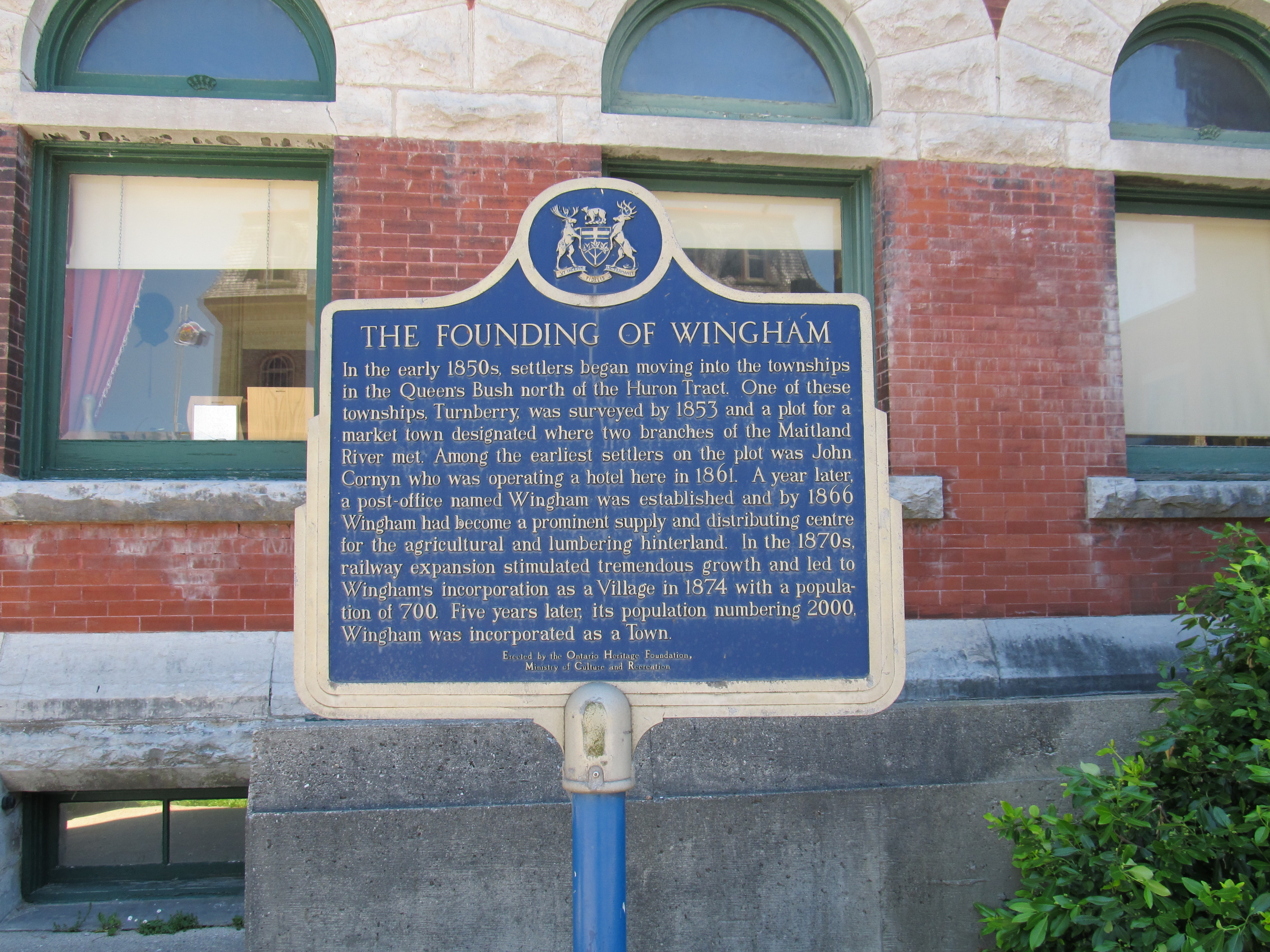
Founding plaque

The North Huron Museum provides an overview of the history of the Township of North Huron beginning in the Paleolithic era and continuing into modern times. North Wingham Museum

== Notable people ==
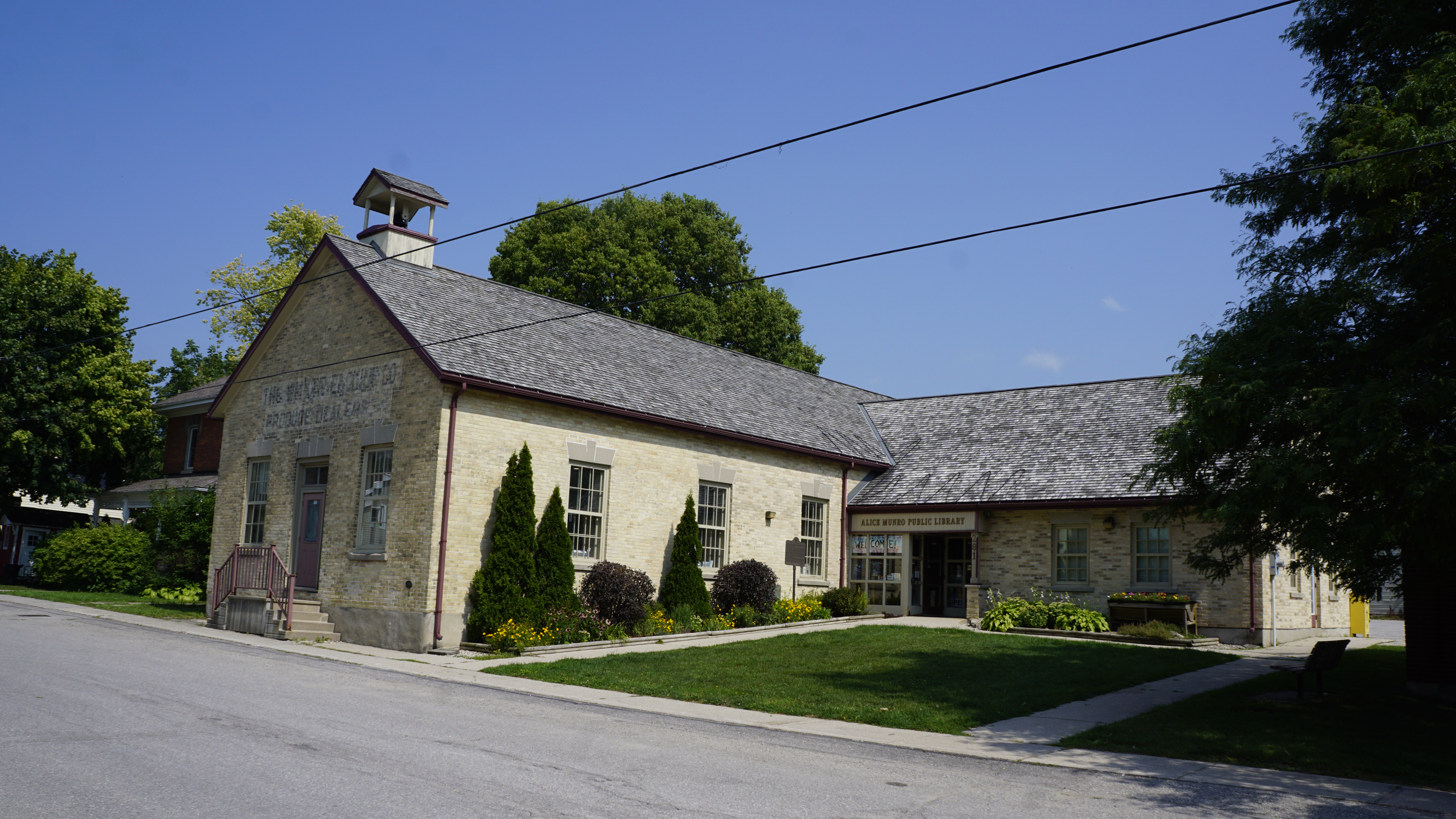
The Alice Munro Public Library, named after Alice Munro

- Dave Farrish - NHL hockey player and current assistant coach of the Colorado Avalanche
- Honoré Jackson - A leader of the North-West Rebellion
- Andrew Kaufman - Writer/film director, raised in Wingham
- Bob McDonald - Science journalist; Officer of the Order of Canada, raised in Wingham
- Alice Munro - 2013 Nobel Prize laureate for literature, born in Wingham, author of short stories set in fictional small towns akin to Wingham
- George Agnew Reid - Artist, raised near Wingham.
- Caroline Wellwood, nurse missionary in China, raised in Wingham
- Doug Wood - Canadian record holder in pole vault, raised in Wingham

=== Politicians ===
- William Aberhart - Premier of Alberta, 1935–1943. Taught public school in Wingham.
- Murray Elston - Ontario MPP, 1981–1994. Born in Wingham.
- George Johnston - Alberta MLA and Speaker, 1921–1936. Born in Wingham.
- Robert Mooney - Manitoba MLA, 1922–1953. Born in Wingham.
- George Spotton - MP, 1927–1935. Wingham businessman.
- Robert Weir - MP, Minister of Agriculture, 1930-1935. Born in Wingham.
