= Robert Gibbons (politician) =

Canadian politician (1811–1898)

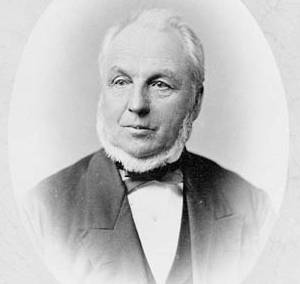
- Robert Gibbons; Source: Library and Archives Canada

Member of the Legislative Assembly of Ontario for Huron South
- In office 1867–1871

Personal details
- Born: December 24, 1811 Glasgow, Scotland
- Died: August 19, 1898 (aged 86) Goderich, Ontario
- Party: Liberal

Robert Gibbons (December 24, 1811 – August 19, 1898) was an Ontario political figure. He represented Huron South in the Legislative Assembly of Ontario as a Liberal member in 1867 and from 1871 to 1872.

He was born in Glasgow, Scotland in 1811 and came to Lanark County in Upper Canada with his family in 1820. They spent five years farming near Potsdam, New York and then Robert moved to Goderich in 1832. He farmed there, raised livestock, and worked as a butcher. Gibbons served in the local militia during the Upper Canada Rebellion. He was warden (head of a county council) for Huron County and served as mayor of Goderich in 1853 to 1855. He was elected to the Ontario legislature in 1867 but unseated on appeal in 1868 and reelected in 1871; he resigned his seat to become sheriff for Huron County in 1872. He died at Goderich in 1898.

== Electoral history ==
1867 Ontario general election: Huron South
| Party | Candidate | Votes | % |
|---|---|---|---|
| Liberal | Robert Gibbons | 1,558 | 50.16 |
| Conservative | Isaac Carling | 1,548 | 49.84 |
| Total valid votes | | 3,106 | 82.00 |
| Eligible voters | | 3,788 | |
| Liberal pickup new district. | | | |
Source: Elections Ontario

1871 Ontario general election: Huron South
| Party | Candidate | Votes | % | ±% |
|---|---|---|---|---|
| Liberal | Robert Gibbons | 1,561 | 53.55 | +3.39 |
| Conservative | Isaac Carling | 1,354 | 46.45 | −3.39 |
| Turnout | | 2,915 | 71.64 | −10.36 |
| Eligible voters | | 4,069 | | |
| Liberal hold | | Swing | | +3.39 |
Source: Elections Ontario
