= Ontario Students Against Impaired Driving =

- Abbreviation: OSAID
- Formation: December 1, 1988; 37 years ago
- Type: Independent charity, non-profit
- Location: Eastern Ontario
- Region served: Ontario
- Members: Free, open to Secondary School students
- Official language: English
- Executive director: Matt Evans
- Volunteers: 5,000 (annual)
- Website: www.osaid.ca

Ontario Students Against Impaired Driving Founded in 1987, OSAID is an anti-impaired driving initiative which is found across the province of Ontario, Canada, aimed primarily at youth involvement in combating impaired driving. and encourages the student population to practice responsible choices and to never to drive while impaired. OSAID chapter members regularly hold awareness raising activities, such as mocktail sales or events aimed at raising awareness about the dangers of driving while impaired.

OSAID describes itself as "... a provincial youth driven organization peer education, health promotion and injury prevention program that strives to promote smart healthy choices through education and public awareness to prevent tragedies caused by impaired and distracted driving."

== Mission ==
Its mission statement, as described in an introductory meeting, is, "OSAID is about teens helping teens to consider safe alternatives and new perspectives to the perceived norms about Alcohol, Illicit Drugs, and Dangerous Driving."

OSAID by the numbers:

- OSAID positively impacts students and families every year
- OSAID reaches more than 50,000 students annually

== History ==
The organization was started in 1987 as a collaboration between students, teachers and police to raise awareness to youth about the dangers of driving while impaired. In 1989, the logo was designed and the name "OSAID" was chosen. A newsletter was created and distributed among about 200 students involved with the project.

The organization began holding workshops and launching media campaigns to get its message out. Scholarships have been awarded to youth shown to be exemplary in raising awareness of driving while under the influence, and continue today.

=== Media campaigns ===
OSAID's media campaigns have been multifaceted, utilizing various forms of communication to spread their message of road safety and youth leadership. These campaigns have included short films, public service announcements (PSAs), newsletters, and educational materials like the iDrive Road Stories DVD. Their efforts have been made possible through financial support from numerous organizations, including key provincial bodies such as the Ministry of Transportation, the Ministry of Community Safety and Correctional Services, and the Ministry of Health Promotion and Sport.

Federal agencies like Transport Canada have also contributed, along with private insurers such as the Ontario Teachers' Insurance Plan (OTIP/RAEO), IBAO, Teacher Life, and Wawanesa. Additionally, individual sponsors have played a role in funding OSAID's initiatives.

In 1990, a short film entitled Life of the Party was produced by OSAID and nominated for best short education film at Canada's Short Film Festival, and in 1996 was selected as one of the top ten videos as a resource for educators by the Driver Education Advisory Committee. Public service announcements aired on television in 1991 for six months. In 1993, the Ministry of Transportation of Ontario collaborated in the poster Santa Rides with Deers, Not Beers. OSAID teamed with the Attorney General D/D Countermeasures Office to offer Arrive Alive video dances in Ontario high schools.

The 2009 iDrive Road Stories DVD, a 23-minute video created to educate youth about safe, sober driving, was produced with input from the organization.

OSAID newsletters, such as OSAID Speaks (began in 2010), have been distributed as an online resource through the OSAID website.

The "Meet the Challenge" project in 2012, produced in partnership with the Ministry of Health Promotion and Sport, took place across the province.

OSAID developed and released online "Call Me" cards to serve as a promise that teenagers would call a sober driver, if needed, rather than try to drive themselves, with an accompanying contract.

== See also ==
- Impaired driving in Canada
