= Dashwood, Ontario =

Coordinates: 43.343594°N 81.634169°W

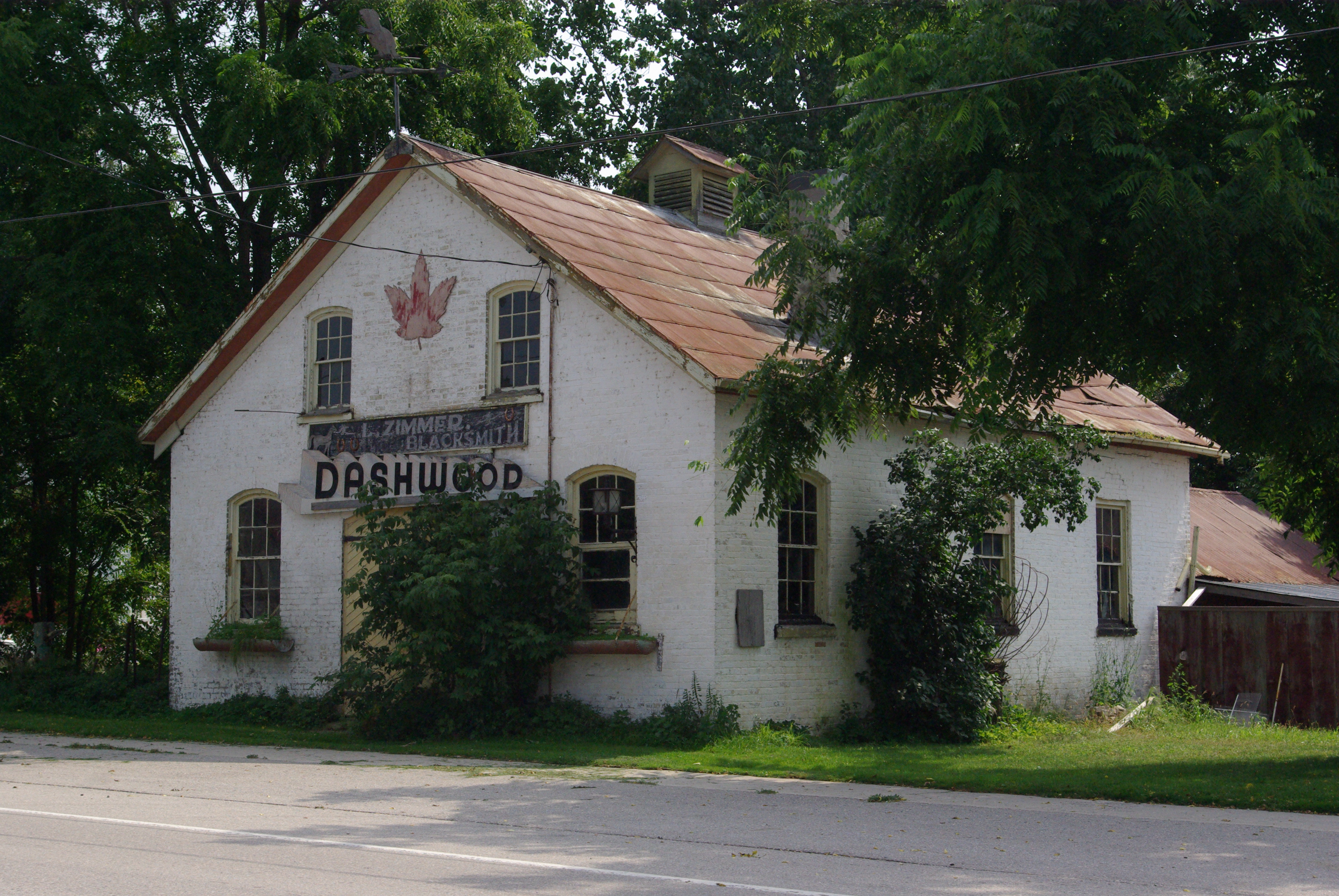
Former blacksmith shop in Dashwood, Ontario

Dashwood (original name Friedsburg) is a small, primarily residential, community in southwestern Ontario, Canada. It is a former police village, at the intersection of Bronson Line and Dashwood Road, on the boundary between the municipalities of Bluewater and South Huron. Dashwood is approximately 50 kilometres northwest of London, near the resort village of Grand Bend on the southeast coast of Lake Huron.

== History ==
Dashwood began when the brothers Noah and Absalom Fried formerly of Blenheim Township in Oxford County, resettled in the area in 1853. They first erected a sawmill, followed shortly by a grain mill, on the site of the future community serving the needs of the influx of mainly European settlers brought about by the local development of Canada Company lands earlier in the century. They had intended to build their mills at Sarepta, 2 kilometres (1.2 mi) east of the present site of Dashwood on Dashwood Road, but they changed their plans when lower cost land became available at the current site. The name of the community was changed from Friedsburg to Dashwood in December 1871, when a post office was opened, Noah Fried became the first postmaster. Although the subject of some debate Dashwood was likely named after Dashwood House, in London England, the headquarters in Britain of the once regionally important Grand Trunk Railway. Peak economic activity occurred in Dashwood in the early to mid-20th century and at its height included a number of mills, hotels, general stores, a regionally large-scale window manufacturing company and an assortment of shops and services geared to its rural surroundings.

== See also ==
- South Huron
- Huron County, Ontario
