= CKNX-TV =

Television station in Wingham, Ontario (1955–2009)

Converted to analogue rebroadcaster of CFPL-DT, London, Ontario
- Wingham, Ontario; Canada
- Channels: Analog: 8 (VHF)

Programming
- Affiliations: CBC (1955–1988); CBS (secondary, 1956–1961); Independent (1988–1998); NewNet (1998–2005); A (2005–2009)

Ownership
- Owner: CTVglobemedia; (CTV Limited)

History
- First air date: November 18, 1955
- Last air date: August 31, 2009

Technical information
- ERP: 260 kW
- HAAT: 241.7 m (793 ft)
- Transmitter coordinates: 44°5′25″N 81°12′26″W

CKNX-TV (channel 8) was a television station in Wingham, Ontario, Canada, which served mid-western Ontario as part of the A television system. Owned by CTVglobemedia (now known as Bell Media), the station maintained studios at Carling Terrace on John Street in Wingham, with transmitter on Tower Road in South Bruce. A bureau in Owen Sound closed down in late 2004.

In February 2009, CTV announced it would not renew CKNX's broadcast licence for the 2009–2010 television season and put the station up for sale. In April 2009, CTV announced a deal to sell the station along with two other sister stations in Windsor and Brandon to Shaw Communications for a dollar; however, the deal was rejected in June. As a result, CKNX closed down as a separate station on August 31, 2009, with its transmitter remaining in operation as an analogue rebroadcaster of CFPL-DT in London.

== History ==
CKNX was founded by W. T. "Doc" Cruickshank and signed on as a CBC Television affiliate on November 18, 1955. It was based in a former high school along with its sister AM radio station CKNX. After going to air, one of their early identification cards displayed the station's mascot, which was a smiling television camera wearing a large cowboy hat.

CKNX-TV logo from 1969

On March 8, 1962, the building which accommodated the CKNX radio and television stations caught fire. Although nothing could be salvaged, CKNX-TV was on the air again later that night with the help of nearby stations CFPL-DT, CKVR-DT, CKCO-DT, and CBLT-DT. CKNX operations continued as such (with various temporary offices set up in Wingham) until they purchased new equipment and moved into a new building in 1963.

Logo used while part of the BBS system from 1994 to 1998.

That year, the station expanded its coverage to Kitchener in response to CKCO-TV's affiliation with CTV. Staffers were required to be more versatile than ever to better compete, giving them well-rounded knowledge for moving up in the industry. For example, the zany host of the noon cartoon program would often become the serious anchor for the 12:30 newscast.

=== As an independent and The New NX ===
CKNX disaffiliated from the CBC on September 4, 1988, and operated an independent station for nearly ten years until CHUM Limited purchased the station from Baton Broadcasting. Under the ownership of CHUM, the station joined the NewNet system and was accordingly rebranded The New NX.

Logo used while as The New NX, used from 1998 to 2005.

The New NX's news program, NewsNow, drew the lowest viewership of all NewNet stations (82,000) which is not surprising, since it was in the smallest NewNet market. News programming aired on CKNX was simulcast from CFPL in London, though CKNX viewers still received a separate 11 p.m. news feed (Monday through Friday) which originated from the CFPL studios.

=== As A-Channel Wingham ===
On August 2, 2005, CKNX was rebranded "A-Channel", along with all of the other NewNet Stations. NewsNow at Noon was discontinued a month before the rebrand.

On July 12, 2006, CTV owner CTVglobemedia announced plans to purchase A-Channel owner CHUM Limited for CA$1.7 billion, with plans to divest itself of the A-Channel and Access Alberta stations.

Logo used while as A-Channel, used from 2005–2008.

On April 9, 2007, it was announced that Rogers Communications filed with the Canadian Radio-television and Telecommunications Commission (CRTC) to purchase all of the A-Channel stations, including CKNX, CKX-TV, Access Alberta and several cable channels being put up for sale in the wake of CTVglobemedia's pending acquisition of the CHUM group.

On June 8, 2007, the CRTC announced its approval of CTVglobemedia's purchase of CHUM Limited, but added a condition that CTVglobemedia must sell off CHUM's Citytv stations to another buyer while keeping the A-Channel stations (including CKNX), in effect cancelling the planned sale of A-Channel to Rogers Media.

All of the CHUM Limited channels (with the exception of Citytv) were taken over by CTVglobemedia on June 22, 2007. On July 26, 2007, CTVglobemedia named Richard Gray the head of news for the A-Channel stations and CKX-TV who would report to the CTVglobemedia corporate group, not CTV News, to preserve independent news presentation and management. Gray would oversee the news departments for CKVR, CHRO, CFPL, CKNX, CHWI, CIVI and CKX-TV.

=== As A Wingham ===
On August 11, 2008, CKNX and all of the A-Channel stations were renamed "A". The A soft launch began in June 2008 in A-Channel's press releases and on the station's local newscasts known as A News.

Final logo used while as A, 2008–2009.

On February 25, 2009, CTV announced that, given the ongoing structural problems facing the conventional television sector in Canada and the global economic crisis, it would not be applying to the CRTC for renewal of the licences of CKNX-TV and its sister station CHWI-TV in Wheatley/Windsor. CTV said that with the CRTC's decision to disallow fee-for-carriage, CKNX-TV and CHWI-TV—the two smallest stations in the A system—were no longer viable.

The stations' transmitters were to be shut down entirely instead of becoming rebroadcasters of London's A station, CFPL. CFPL was expected to be available on cable, and remain available on satellite, in the affected areas following the shutdown. CTV says it would continue news coverage of the Southwestern Ontario region through CFPL and CTV network station CKCO.

On April 30, 2009, Shaw Communications announced it would purchase CKNX, CHWI and CKX-TV in Brandon, Manitoba for a dollar each from CTVglobemedia, pending CRTC approval. However, it was reported on June 30, 2009, that Shaw had backed out of the deal and declined to complete the purchase, putting the stations' futures in serious doubt.

On July 8, 2009, CTV said it would not reconsider its decision to end separate local programming on CKNX, but decided to maintain the Wingham transmitter as a rebroadcaster of CFPL, pending CRTC approval. The same day, CTV announced it would retain its sister station, CHWI in Windsor until at least 2010, based on temporary increases to the Local Programming Improvement Fund. In addition, the CRTC renewed the licences for CKNX, CHWI and CKX, even though CTV had not filed renewals for these stations. As a result, on August 31, CKNX signed off for the last time as a separate station, becoming a full-time repeater of CFPL. CKNX was the eighth and final television station in Canada of the 2000s to become a rebroadcaster since the CTV-owned CBC stations in Saskatchewan and Northern Ontario became rebroadcasters of CBKT in Regina and CBLT in Toronto in October 2002. In addition, Canwest-owned CHCA-TV, an E! station in Red Deer, Alberta, closed down the same day without becoming a rebroadcaster. CTV-owned CKX-TV, a CBC Television affiliate in Brandon, Manitoba followed, closing down operations on October 2 after Bluepoint Investment Corporation reneged on the sale of CKX. Both CKX and CKNX were on-air from 1955 to 2009.

=== Future of CKNX-TV as a repeater ===
On June 27, 2016, it was announced that Bell Media filed a proposal with the CRTC to shut down 40 of its television transmitters (all rebroadcasters of other stations), due to maintenance costs, high cable and satellite viewership, and no generation of revenue; CKNX-TV is one of the transmitters to be closed down. This was part of Bell's regular periodic licence renewal process, which began on February 11, 2016. Bell Media explains the rationale for deleting these analog repeaters:

"We are electing to delete these analog transmitters from the main licence with which they are associated. These analog transmitters generate no incremental revenue, attract little to no viewership given the growth of BDU or DTH subscriptions and are costly to maintain, repair or replace. In addition, none of the highlighted transmitters offer any programming that differs from the main channels. The Commission has determined that broadcasters may elect to shut down transmitters but will lose certain regulatory privileges (distribution on the basic service, the ability to request simultaneous substitution) as noted in Broadcasting Regulatory Policy CRTC 2015–24, Over-the-air transmission of television signals and local programming. We are fully aware of the loss of these regulatory privileges as a result of any transmitter shutdown."

== Notable personalities ==
- Crawford Douglas (anchor/reporter, 1974–1979)
- Bernie McNamee
