= South Huron =

Municipality in Ontario, Canada

- Municipality (lower-tier)
- Municipality of South Huron
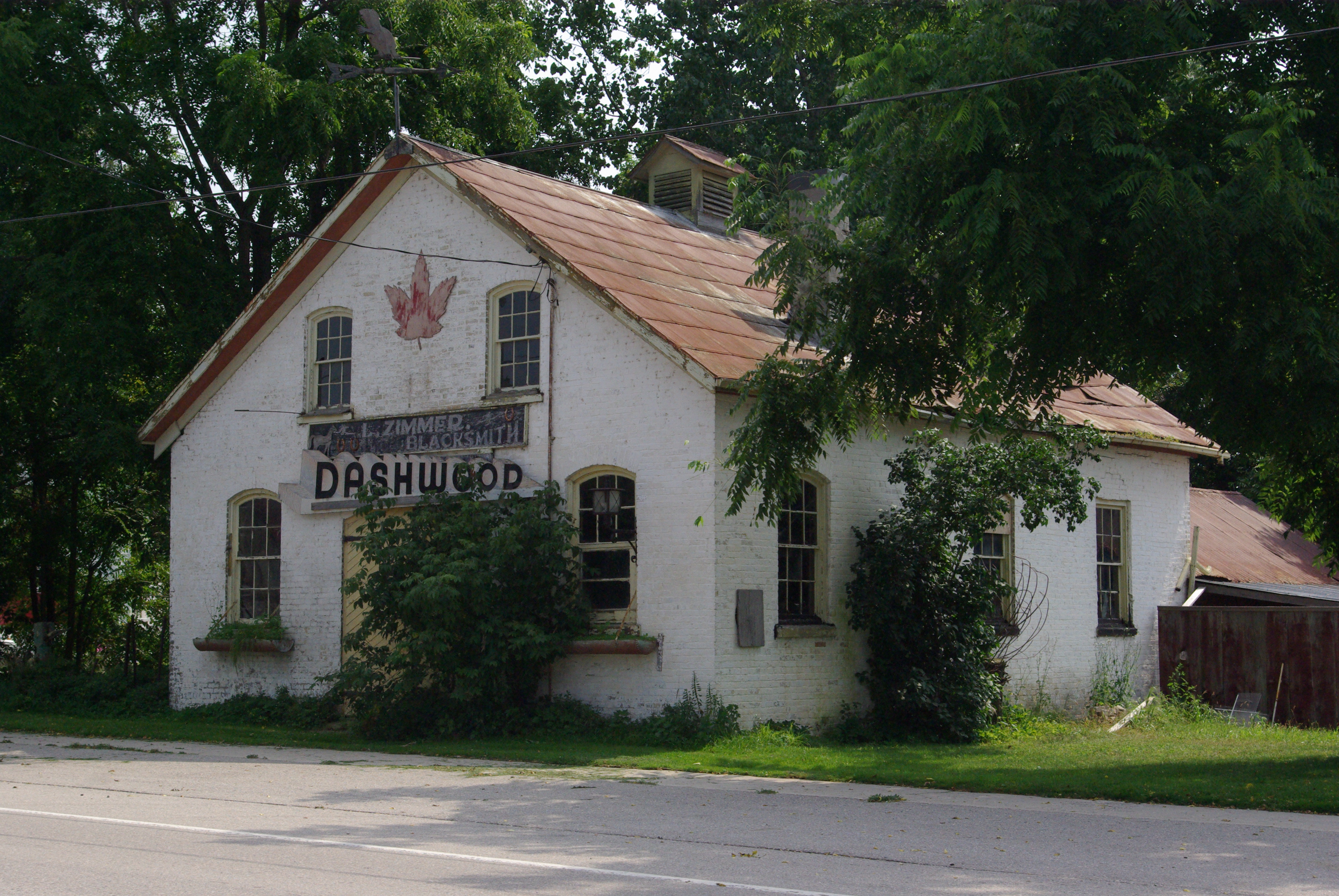
- Dashwood

- Location within Southern Ontario
- Coordinates: 43°19′N 81°30′W
- Country: Canada
- Province: Ontario
- County: Huron
- Settled: 1842
- Formed: 2001

Government
  - Mayor: George Finch
  - Fed. riding: Huron—Bruce
  - Prov. riding: Huron—Bruce

Area
  - Land: 425.12 km^{2} (164.14 sq mi)

Population (2021)
  - Total: 10,037
  - Density: 23.6/km^{2} (61/sq mi)
- Time zone: UTC-5 (EST)
  - Summer (DST): UTC-4 (EDT)
- Postal Code: N0M
- Area codes: 519, 226
- Website: www.southhuron.ca

South Huron is a municipality in the Canadian province of Ontario, located in the southern part of Huron County. It was formed by amalgamation of the townships of Stephen and Usborne with the Town of Exeter in 2001, in an Ontario-wide municipal restructuring imposed by the provincial government.

== Communities ==
Communities in South Huron include:

- Centralia
- Crediton
- Dashwood
- Elmville
- Exeter
- Huron Park
- Kirkton
- Mount Carmel
- Shipka
- Winchelsea
- Woodham

== Demographics ==
In the 2021 Census of Population conducted by Statistics Canada, South Huron had a population of 10,037 living in 4,322 of its 4,705 total private dwellings, a change of −0.6% from its 2016 population of 10,096. With a land area of 425.12 km^{2} (164.14 sq mi), it had a population density of 23.6/km^{2} (61.1/sq mi) in 2021.

Historical census populations – South Huron
Year	Pop.	±%
1996	10,229	—
2001	10,019	−2.1%
2006	9,982	−0.4%
2011	9,945	−0.4%
2016	10,096	+1.5%
2021	10,037	−0.6%
2021 Population figure based on revised count. Source: Statistics Canada

== Transportation ==
The community is home to Centralia/James T. Field Memorial Aerodrome, a public airport and former British Commonwealth Air Training Plan base. The airport has no scheduled flights, only private general aviation. (The closest airline service is London International Airport.) The airfield hosts a company that modifies private jets.

Ontario Highway 4 is the main road serving South Huron; it connects with highways 401 and 402 in London, Ontario.

== Services ==
Policing in South Huron is from the Ontario Provincial Police's Clinton detachment.

South Huron Fire Department is a mix of full-time and volunteers at three fire stations.

Huron County EMS serves South Huron from their Exeter base.

== See also ==
- Huron South
- Huron Tract
- List of townships in Ontario
