= Thomas Farrow =

Canadian politician

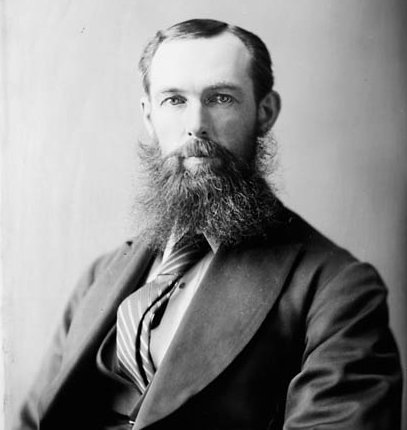

Member of the Canadian Parliament for Huron North
- In office 1872–1882
- Preceded by: Joseph Whitehead
- Succeeded by: James Bowman

Member of the Canadian Parliament for Huron East
- In office 1882–1887
- Preceded by: District created in 1882
- Succeeded by: Peter Macdonald

Personal details
- Born: March 8, 1833 Mumby, Lincoln County, England
- Died: April 15, 1916 (aged 83) Collingwood, Ontario

Thomas Farrow (March 8, 1833 – April 15, 1916) was a Canadian merchant and political figure. He represented Huron North in the House of Commons of Canada as a Liberal Conservative from 1872 to 1882 and Huron East as a Conservative member from 1882 to 1887.

He was born in Mumby, Lincoln County, England, the son of Martin Farrow, was educated there and came to Canada West in 1849. In 1858, he married Mary McDonald. He served as superintendent of schools for Wawanosh, Morris and Turnberry townships in Huron County for several years. Farrow was defeated by Peter Macdonald in his bid for reelection in 1887. He died in Collingwood at the age of 83.
