= Thomas Chisholm =

Canadian politician

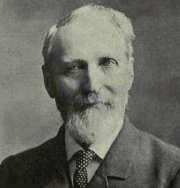

Member of the Canadian Parliament for Huron East
- In office 1904–1911
- Preceded by: Peter Macdonald
- Succeeded by: James Bowman

Personal details
- Born: April 12, 1842 Glen Williams, Canada West
- Died: October 1, 1931 (aged 89)
- Party: Conservative

Thomas Chisholm (April 12, 1842 – October 1, 1931) was a Canadian physician and politician.

Born in Glen Williams, Halton County, Canada West, the son of John Chisholm and Jane McClure, he graduated from the University of Toronto School of Medicine in 1879. He was principal of Public Schools at Belwood and Waterdown, Ontario. He was a lecturer in the Faculty of Medicine in the University of Western Ontario in London, Ontario.

He was first elected to the House of Commons of Canada for the electoral district of Huron East in the general elections of 1904. A Conservative, he was re-elected in 1908 and did not run in 1911.
