= Robert McKinley (politician) =

Canadian politician (1928–2022)

- Official 1979 portrait

Member of Parliament for Huron
- In office 8 November 1965 – 8 July 1974
- Preceded by: Elston Cardiff
- Succeeded by: Constituency abolished

Member of Parliament for Huron-Middlesex
- In office 8 July 1974 – 4 June 1979
- Preceded by: Constituency established
- Succeeded by: Constituency abolished

Member of Parliament for Huron-Bruce
- In office 4 June 1979 – 2 March 1980
- Preceded by: Constituency established
- Succeeded by: Murray Cardiff

Personal details
- Born: 14 August 1928 Zurich, Ontario, Canada
- Died: 16 October 2022 (aged 94) Clinton, Ontario, Canada
- Party: National Government; Progressive Conservative
- Spouse: Audrey McKinley (d. 2017)
- Profession: Farmer

Robert Elgin McKinley (14 August 1928 – 16 October 2022) was a Canadian politician who was a Progressive Conservative party member of the House of Commons of Canada. His career included investment and insurance brokering, business and farming.

McKinley represented the Huron electoral district (which became Huron—Middlesex and Huron—Bruce during his terms in Parliament) since first winning office in the 1965 federal election. He was re-elected in 1968, 1972, 1974 and 1979. He left national politics in 1980 as he did not campaign in that year's federal election after serving successive terms from the 27th to the 31st Canadian Parliaments. McKinley died on 16 October 2022, at the age of 94.
