= Robert Deachman =

Canadian politician

Robert J. Deachman

Member of Parliament for Huron North
- In office October 1935 – March 1940
- Preceded by: George Spotton
- Succeeded by: Elston Cardiff

Personal details
- Born: Robert John Deachman; 15 December 1878 Howick Township, Ontario, Canada
- Died: 17 February 1955 (aged 76)
- Party: Liberal
- Spouse(s): Elizabeth Grant m. 15 June 1910
- Profession: journalist

Robert John Deachman (15 December 1878 – 17 February 1955) was a Liberal party member of the House of Commons of Canada. He was born in Howick Township, Ontario and became a journalist.

Deachman attended the Ontario Agricultural College and attained a Bachelor of Science in Agriculture degree.

He was first elected to Parliament at the Huron North riding in the 1935 general election. After completing one term, the 18th Canadian Parliament, Deachman was defeated in the 1940 election by Elston Cardiff.

Deachman authored various works such as Tory Markets (c. 1935, Dadson-Merrill Press), The transportation Muddle and the Way Out (c. 1919, Western Canada Publishing) and The Wheat Board Fallacy (c. 1919, Western Canada Publishing). Deachman also contributed a preface to Frédéric Bastiat's book Economic Fallacies.
