= Saugeen Shores =

- Town (lower-tier)
- Town of Saugeen Shores
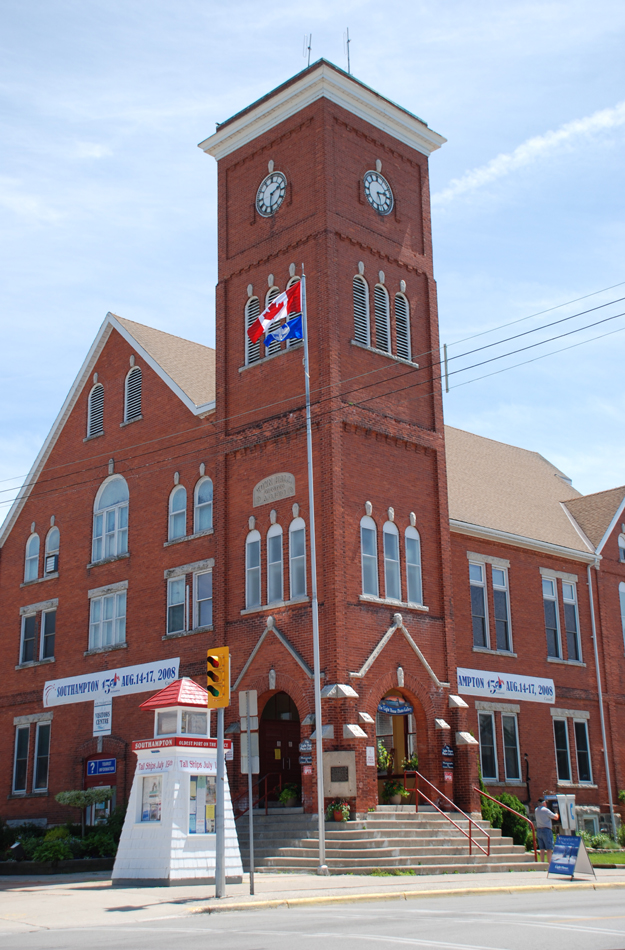
- Old Town Hall, Southampton, ON

- Location within Bruce County Location within Southern Ontario
- Coordinates: 44°26′N 81°22′W
- Country: Canada
- Province: Ontario
- County: Bruce
- Settled: ca. 1849
- Formed: 1998

Government
  - Mayor: Luke Charbonneau
  - Vice Deputy Mayor: Mike Myatt
  - Federal riding: Huron—Bruce
  - Prov. riding: Huron—Bruce

Area
  - Land: 170.19 km^{2} (65.71 sq mi)

Population (2021)
  - Total: 15,908
  - Density: 93.5/km^{2} (242/sq mi)
- Time zone: UTC-5 (EST)
  - Summer (DST): UTC-4 (EDT)
- Postal Code: N0H
- Area codes: 519 and 226
- Website: www.saugeenshores.ca

Saugeen Shores is a town in Bruce County, Ontario, Canada, formed in 1998. In addition to the two main population centres of Southampton and Port Elgin, the town includes a portion of the village of Burgoyne and the North Bruce area, straddling the municipal eastern and southern boundary respectively. In 2016, the permanent population of Saugeen Shores was 13,715, in a land area of 171.05 square kilometres (66.04 sq mi).

The primary employment categories are agriculture, small business, tourism and employment at the Bruce Power nuclear power station. The population doubles in the summer due to cottagers and campers who arrive in the area. Close to MacGregor Point Provincial Park, the town has several beaches on Lake Huron.

== History ==
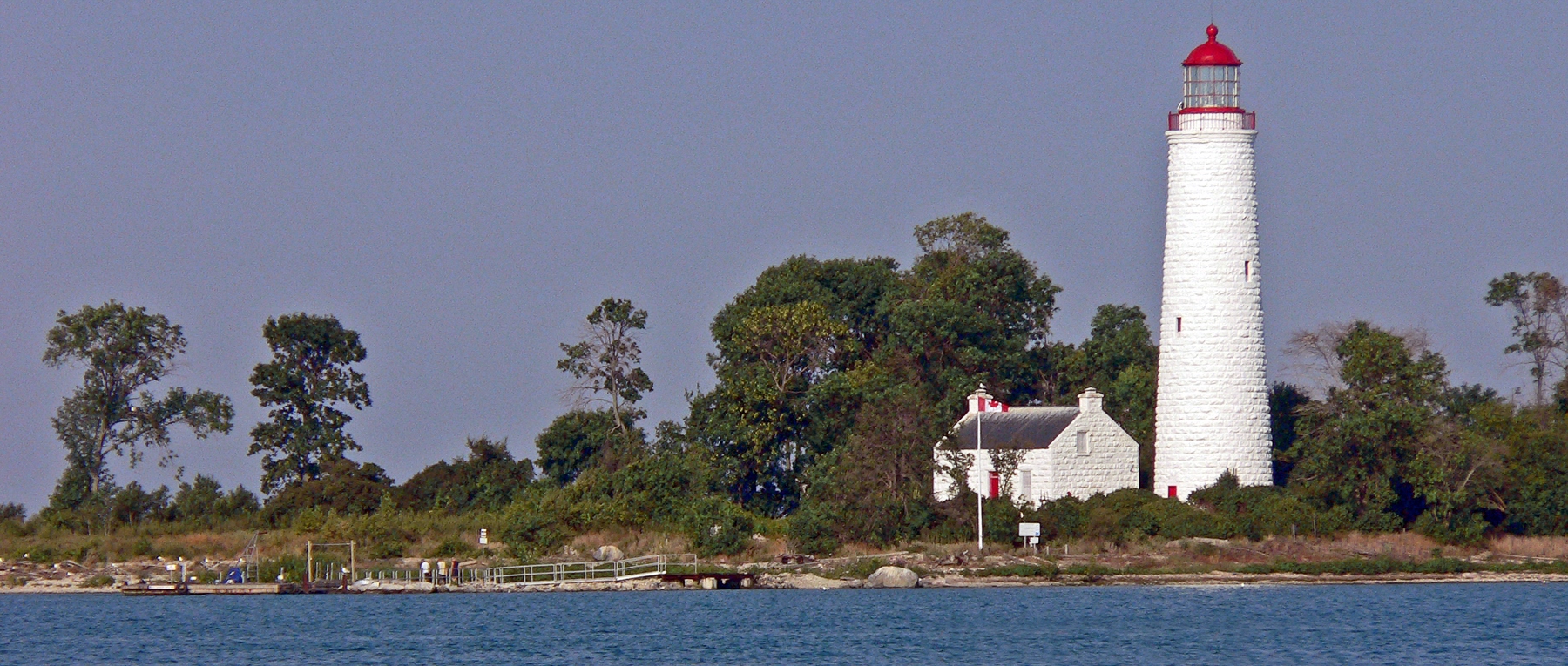
Chantry Island light station, one of those listed on the National Historic Sites of Canada

The name "Saugeen" is the corrupted form of the word Zaagiing in the language of the Chippewas of Saugeen Ojibway Territory, meaning "at the river's outlet" or "at the mouth of the river".

The area that is now Port Elgin was settled by Europeans in 1849 when Lachlan McLean ("Loch Buie") built a shanty and lived in it for the winter. For several years he ran a tavern, his patrons consisting primarily of settlers and sailors passing through the little port. In spring 1852 George Butchart built a dam and saw-mill on Mill Creek.

According to an Ontario historic plaque, Butchart sold the mill to Benjamin Shantz, who built a grist-mill, and within three years, a community of 250 people had developed around these mills. Stores, hotels and tanneries were constructed and in March 1857, a village plot named Port Elgin was laid out. The enterprise of its businessmen, notably Henry Hilker, Samuel Bricker and John Stafford, contributed to the development of the settlement, which had a population of over 600 by 1867. The arrival of the Wellington, Grey and Bruce Railway in 1872 further stimulated the growth of the community and it was incorporated as a village in 1874 with a population of about 950." By 1854, the community had three houses, a tavern, and a mill. Shops, churches, schools, and roads followed, and ten years later, the population totalled six hundred and thirty. Early industries included a steam sawmill, foundry, and woolen mill. In 1873, the railway arrived, allowing Southampton and Port Elgin products to travel out into the world.

Southampton was founded by Captains John Spence and William Kennedy in 1848.

Commercial fishing and coastal trade drove the economy, with the Saugeen River and Lake Huron making for ideal transportation before roads had been built. Its name was changed from Saugeen in 1858. The Chantry Island Lightstation Tower (off Southampton) was completed in April 1859, guiding sailors clear of the underwater boulders that make navigation dangerous. Southampton was incorporated as a town in 1904; at the time, its population was 2,400. The economic base included furniture factories, a tannery and a sawmill. The town built a hospital in 1947, a post office in 1952, a library in 1956, an arena in 1961 (replaced in 1977) and a new firehall in 1974.

On January 30, 1998, the provincial government amalgamated the Towns of Southampton and Port Elgin, together with Saugeen Township, to form the Town of Port Elgin-Saugeen-Southampton. On December 17, 1998, the Province renamed the entity as the Town of Saugeen Shores.

The town's Official Plan (most recently completed in 2014) includes the following comment about the land area: "The Chippewas of the Saugeen First Nation and the Chippewas of Nawash First Nation have filed a Native Land Claim for the islands in the Saugeen River, the lands that border the north side of the Saugeen River and the shoreline from the mouth of the Saugeen River northerly around the Bruce Peninsula."

The community was once home to Bluewater Speedway, a 1/3 mile dirt Stock car racing track located across the road from the current Westlinks development, on Bruce Road 17. The Speedway was in operation from 1952 until 1960.

== Demographics ==
Port Elgin
Year	Pop.	±% p.a.
1871	750	—
1901	1,313	+1.88%
1911	1,235	−0.61%
1921	1,291	+0.44%
1931	1,305	+0.11%
1941	1,395	+0.67%
1951	1,558	+1.11%
1961	1,632	+0.47%
1971	2,855	+5.75%
1981	6,131	+7.94%
1991	6,857	+1.13%

Saugeen Shores
Year	Pop.	±% p.a.
2001	11,388	—
2006	11,720	+0.58%
2011	12,661	+1.56%
2016	13,715	+1.61%

In the 2021 Census of Population conducted by Statistics Canada, Saugeen Shores had a population of 15,908 living in 6,905 of its 8,548 total private dwellings, a change of 16% from its 2016 population of 13,715. With a land area of 170.19 km^{2} (65.71 sq mi), it had a population density of 93.5/km^{2} (242.1/sq mi) in 2021.

Canada census – Saugeen Shores community profile

	2021	2016	2011
Population	15,908 (+16.0% from 2016)	13,715 (8.3% from 2011)	12,661 (8.0% from 2006)
Land area	170.19 km^{2} (65.71 sq mi)	171.05 km^{2} (66.04 sq mi)	170.97 km^{2} (66.01 sq mi)
Population density	93.5/km^{2} (242/sq mi)	80.2/km^{2} (208/sq mi)	74.1/km^{2} (192/sq mi)
Median age	46.8 (M: 44, F: 49.2)	49.5 (M: 47.8, F: 51.0)	49.1 (M: 48.3, F: 49.8)
Private dwellings	8,548 (total) 6,905 (occupied)	7,655 (total)	7,228 (total)
Median household income	$103,000	$87,916

References: 2021 2016 2011

Visible Minorities and Indigenous population
Group		2021 Census		2016 Census		2011 Census		2006 Census	
Group		Population	% of total	Population	% of Total	Population	% of Total	Population	% of Total
Indigenous	First Nations	415	2.7	245	1.8	No data		310	2.7
Indigenous	Métis	260	1.7	180	1.4	No data		310	2.7
Visible Minority		1,190	7.6	620	4.6	No data		425	3.7
All other		13,780	88.0	12,380	92.2	No data		10,820	93.6
Total		15,645	100.0	13,425	100.0	No data		11,555	100.0

Population by mother tongue
Group	2021 Census		2016 Census		2011 Census		2006 Census	
Group	Population	% of total	Population	% of Total	Population	% of Total	Population	% of Total
English	14,140	89.3	12,410	91.7	11,450	92.0	10,600	91.7
French	240	1.5	215	1.6	190	1.5	185	1.6
English and French	80	0.5	30	0.2	15	0.1	15	0.1
All other	1,370	8.7	885	6.5	800	6.4	755	6.6
Total	15,830	100.0	13,540	100.0	12,455	100.0	11,555	100.0

Mobility over previous five years
Group	2021 Census		2016 Census		2011 Census		2006 Census	
Group	Population	% of total	Population	% of Total	Population	% of Total	Population	% of Total
At the same address	8,865	60.0	8,240	64.9	No data		7,350	66.0
In the same municipality	1,990	13.5	2,040	16.0	No data		1,575	14.1
In the same province	3,420	23.1	2,195	17.3	No data		1,900	17.1
From another province	280	1.9	85	0.7	No data		185	1.7
From another country	230	1.5	135	1.1	No data		125	1.1
Total aged 5 or over	14,785	100.0	12,700	100.0	No data		11,140	100.0

== Government ==
Saugeen Shores Council includes a mayor, a deputy mayor, a vice deputy mayor and six councillors. The following were elected in 2018:

Saugeen Shores Council (2018)
Position		Name
Mayor		Luke Charbonneau (acclaimed)
Deputy Mayor		Don Matheson
Vice Deputy Mayor		Mike Myatt
Councillors	Port Elgin Ward	Kristan Shrider; Jami Smith
Councillors	Saugeen Ward	Matt Carr; Dave Myette
Councillors	Southampton Ward	Cheryl Grace; John Rich

== Economy ==
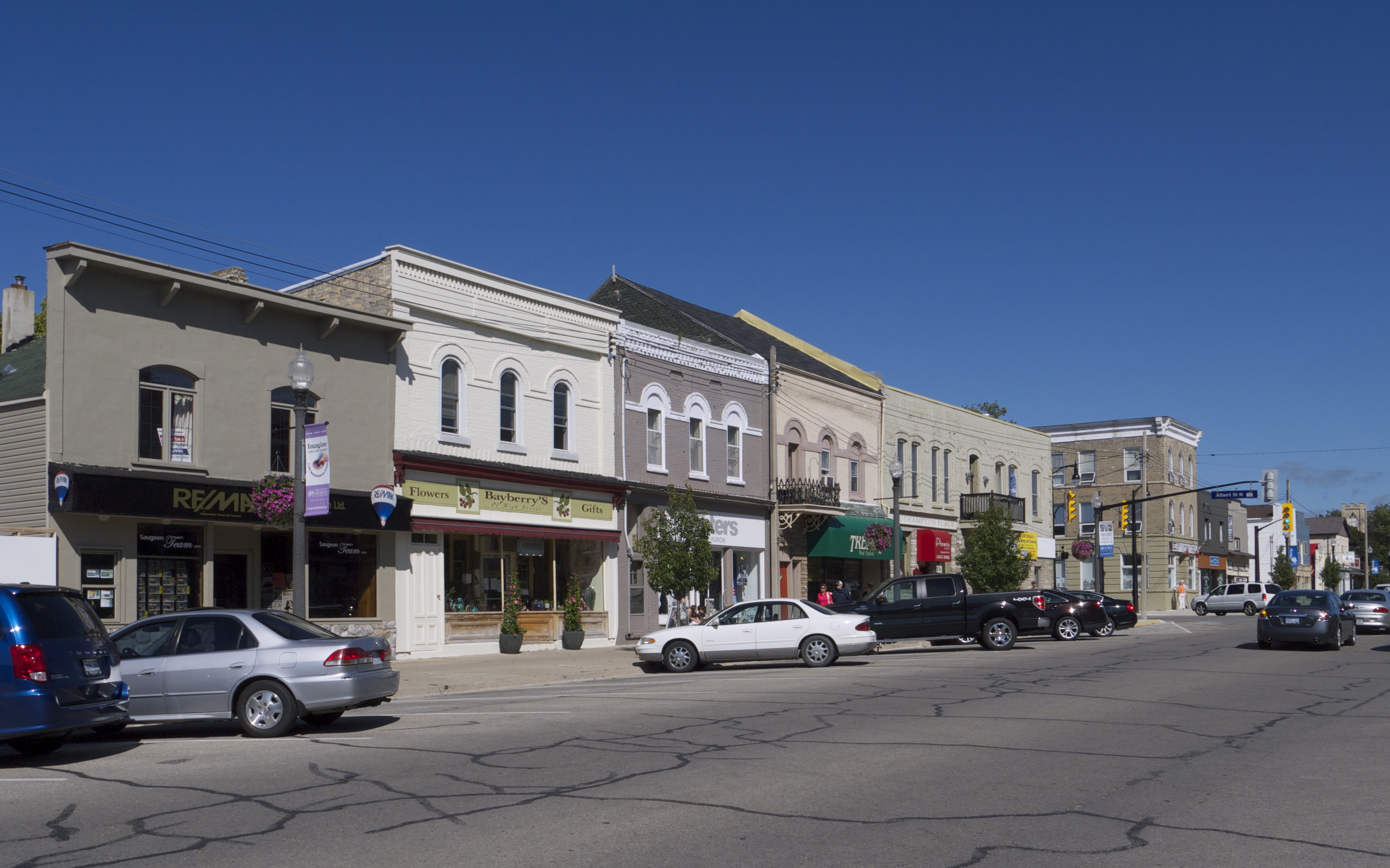
High Street, Southampton

The major economic activities in this region are agriculture, small business, electricity generation and tourism.

The Town's Official Plan (2014) recognizes the value of a broad objective. "Saugeen Shores will continue to be a leader in Bruce County in providing a place for individuals, families, retirees, culture, tourism, business and industrial opportunities."

A new Saugeen Shores' new Economic Development Advisory Committee (EDAC) was formed in 2017 including council members from Port Elgin and Southampton, as well as citizens. The town offered this comment about the plans for the group: "The Committee's set of responsibilities has yet to be finalized but among them will be to... make recommendations respecting implementation of the Community Improvement Plans (CIP), Streetscape plans and Facade Improvement Studies in both Port Elgin and Southampton including capital improvements.... One of its most important roles will be to advise Council on the development of policy and programs related to economic vitality with a view to enhancing prosperity through coordinated public investment fostering private development and retention of existing jobs".

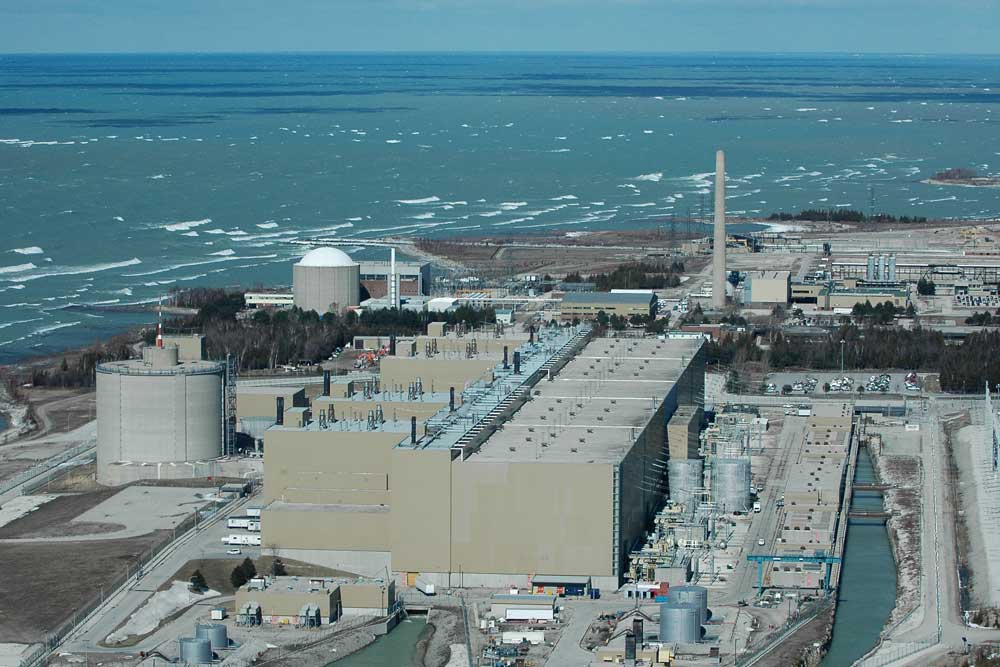
Bruce Nuclear employs many who live in the general area

A major employer of the workforce living in Saugeen Shores, the Bruce Nuclear Generating Station in Tiverton, Ontario, started a $13 billion refurbishment program in 2016 which will provide employment for many residents and maintain demand for other services. According to Bruce Power, this multi-year plan "will generate between 1,500 and 2,500 jobs on site annually – and 18,000 across Ontario directly and indirectly – while injecting up to $4 billion annually into Ontario’s economy".

=== Agriculture ===
Agriculture is the longest standing economic practice in the region. Intensive livestock operations include beef and dairy, cattle and hogs. Over a third of Ontario's beef industry is based in Bruce County. Two-thirds of the land within Saugeen Shores is excellent for cash crops. Fresh produce grown locally is sold locally too.

Beef and dairy farming are the primary agricultural activities with orchards, berries, and some large market gardens also in operation.

=== Small business ===
Southampton resembles a quaint village with a variety of retail stores, boutiques, restaurants, gift shops, and automotive garages. Port Elgin's main street features varied retail uses plus gift shops, restaurants, grocery stores, boutiques, and novelty shops.

The Port Elgin Business Park has land for industrial and commercial uses. Businesses already located here are in the transportation, fuel, technology, recreation and automotive sectors. The Municipal Offices, Community Complex, Police Department and Bruce County Library Headquarters are also here.

=== Electricity generation ===
Saugeen Shores and Ontario's energy sector have a long-standing relationship via the region's largest employer. Bruce Power, the licensed operator of the Bruce Nuclear Generating Station, forms the core of the municipality's economic base by providing highly skilled, well paid jobs. More than a third of its 3,500 employees reside in Saugeen Shores.

=== Tourism ===
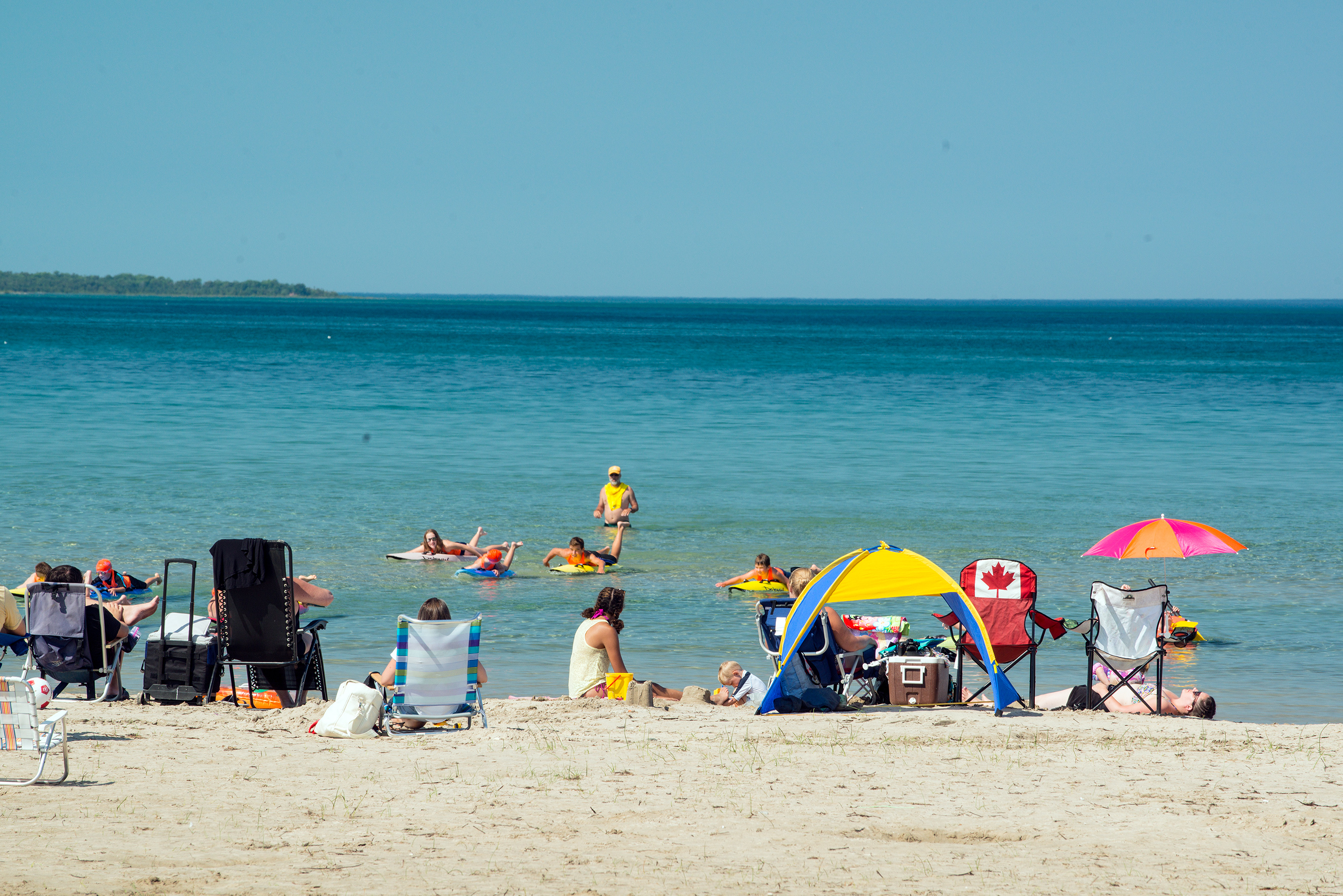
Beach at Southampton, Ontario

The long sandy beach attracts visitors who are primarily families; many rent or own cottages in the area. (Young singles tend to prefer Sauble Beach some 18 kilometers north of Southampton.) The entire Saugeen Shores beach of the Lake Huron shore faces west so it is famous for its sunsets on the water. Cottage Life magazine rated the area highly in its article "10 Spectacular Places to Watch a Sunset in Ontario": "With clear skies, a dry atmosphere, and an unobstructed view of the skyline, many of the west-facing towns along the shores of Lake Huron have the perfect conditions for a breathtaking sunset."

The area also features Port Elgin's busy harbour, Southampton's serene Chantry Island, to the Saugeen river winding its way through the countryside of Saugeen Township. Summer residents are a longstanding feature of Saugeen Shores. In addition to cottages, the communities are also home to a number of trailer parks, hotels and two municipal tourist camps. The local population more than doubles during the summer, substantially benefitting local businesses. Highlights include the Chantry Island Imperial Lighthouse tours; the Bruce County Museum and Cultural Centre; walking, running, and cycling trails.

The Bruce County Museum & Cultural Centre provides displays about local history and in summer especially, offers adult and children's programming and special events. These are listed in the Shoreline Beacon community newspaper. The museum has been enlarged over the years. In addition to a settlers' cabin, the facility houses numerous historic artifacts from the area, genealogical records, county newspapers, photographs, and municipal documents.

The Chantry Island lighthouse in Southampton, now completely renovated, was completed in 1859, first lit on April 1, with Duncan McGregor Lambert as the first keeper. The tower and the keeper's home have been extensively renovated. From late-May to mid-September, tours of Chantry Island are available from only one company, reaching the island on a small boat that leaves from the ticket office by the fishing boat docks. The tower and the keeper's home have been extensively renovated but the island is a federal bird sanctuary and access is otherwise prohibited.

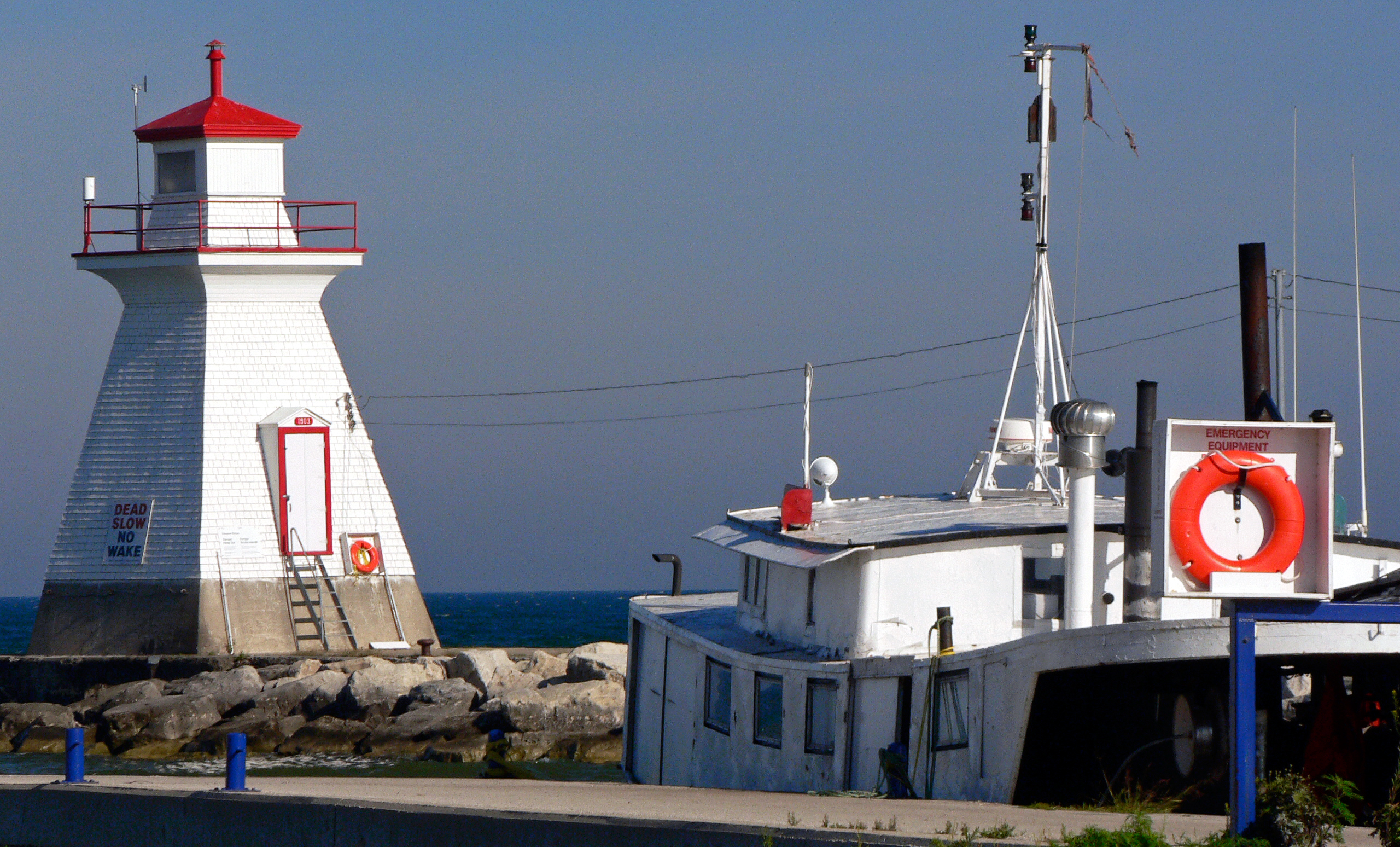
Harbour Range lighthouse, designated under the Heritage Lighthouse Protection Act

Three other lighthouses have been designated under the federal Heritage Lighthouse Protection Act in 2012: McNab Point and both the Front and Rear Range lights at the Saugeen River Front.

The TripAdvisor travel web site's users who have visited Port Elgin recommend the nearby MacGregor Point Provincial Park, the Saugeen Rail Trail walking/cycling route, the Brucedale Conservation Area with small camp sites, and the several nearby golf courses.

The three top-rated attractions in Southampton according to TripAdvisor user reviews are the Southampton Board Walk (along the lakefront), the Bruce County Museum & Cultural Centre and the Southampton Art School and Gallery. The fourth on the list is the tour of Chantry Island Lighthouse. The site also recommends canoeing and kayaking opportunities on the Saugeen River, the walking trail around Fairy Lake (downtown) and the various golf courses in the area.

==== Saugeen Rail Trail ====
After the railways ceased to service the area, the tracks were removed and the beds were vacant and overgrown. According to the Saugeen RailTrail Association, the group of volunteers was formed in 1990 and convinced Port Elgin, Southampton and Saugeen Township to acquire sections of the then unused rail bed. Over the years, the bed has been developed as trails for walking and cycling. The trail connects Southampton and Port Elgin. The trail also connects to the 80 kilometre long Bruce County Trail Network which leads to towns such as Paisley, Walkerton, Mildmay and Kincardine.

The trailhead can be accessed at River Street in Port Elgin, a few blocks north of the town centre and east of Hwy 21. There are other access points in both towns, some with parking. The trail is not groomed for cross country skiing during the winter but is used frequently for that purpose. Maps of the trails are available on the web site of the Saugeen Railtrail Association.

== Education ==
Education is administered by the Bluewater District School Board. Schools in Saugeen Shores include École Port Elgin Saugeen Central School, Saugeen District Senior School, Northport Elementary School, St. Joseph School, and G.C. Huston. As well as other private education facilities, such as the Port Elgin Montessori School and The Learning Academy.

== Health care ==
The town's hospital is in Southampton, Saugeen Memorial. Many physicians' practices are at the Saugeen Shores Medical Building and the Dr Earl Health Centre. The hospital is part of the Grey Bruce Health Services' network of hospitals in northern Bruce and in Grey County. Facilities include 16 beds, a 24-hour emergency department, surgery, acute medical care and outpatient services. According to the local Health Care Services, other facilities include:

- Chaplaincy Services
- Diagnostic Imaging Department including x-ray, ECG, Holter monitoring, ultrasound
- Inpatient Medical Care (Acute Care)
- Laboratory Services
- Physiotherapy
- Surgical Services

The hospital also houses other community health providers. Day surgery services are offered and include ear, nose and throat surgery.

== Retirement and assisted living ==
Saugeen Shores has two retirement and assisted living facilities, and one nursing home. Long Term Care programs are also available to provide in home support allowing elderly residents to live at home as long as possible.

The Town of Saugeen Shores includes senior service groups and clubs as well as aid providers and senior homes that offer full services. Relevant providers include Home and Community Support Services Grey Bruce, two assisted living residences, the Hampton Court Retirement Lodge (Southampton) and Kingsway Arms at Elgin Lodge (Port Elgin) and Southampton Care Centre long-term care home. Social and other services for seniors are available at PARC 55+ (Port Elgin) and Chantry Senior Centre (Southampton).

As well, the Saugeen Shores Chamber of Commerce webpage offers a full listing of seniors' leisure groups and clubs.

== Religious places ==
=== Churches ===
Nineteen churches across a large area, representing most major denominations, serve the municipality's spiritual needs.

=== Mosques ===
Saugeen Shores has one mosque at the Maple Square Mall in Port Elgin.

== Recreation ==
- The Rail Trail is popular with walkers, cyclists, and joggers, cross country skiers and for snowshoeing, Additional trails are continually being developed under the Town's Parks and Trails Master Plan.
- A multitude of snowmobile, cross county ski, mountain bike, and ATV trails throughout Bruce and Grey Counties attract enthusiasts. Nearby, the Bruce Trail traverses the length of the scenic Bruce Peninsula.
- MacGregor Point Provincial Park is an all-season destination for camping, hiking, swimming, wildlife and bird watching. In winter, visitors can camp in yurts, cross-country ski, hike, or go skating.
- The Saugeen River, stretching 102 kilometres from Hanover to Southampton, is popular with canoeists and kayakers from across Ontario. Access points and parks provide facilities along the way.
- For fishers, Lake Huron has salmon, trout, pickerel, and whitefish. The Chantry Chinook Classic Salmon Derby is held each year, usually from about mid July to the second week of August.
- Saugeen Shores and boating are synonymous. Whether sailing or power boating, Saugeen Shores' main harbour can accommodate with 274 slips and all amenities. http://www.saugeenshores.ca/municipal/recreation.php?PageID=181
- Saugeen Shores has five golf courses, over 15 tennis courts, fitness centres, public pool, two arenas, skate park, BMX track, and many organized sports. There are numerous community and service organizations, senior centres and activities, parks, a dog park and many community events.

== Arts, culture, and heritage ==
- Saugeen Shores is home to two theatre groups, the community focused Performing Arts of Saugeen Shores (PASS) and Bruce County Playhouse.
- Pumpkinfest, attracting more than 60,000 visitors, is the premier cultural event held the first weekend of October.
- In September, the Canadian Big Band Celebration recalls the Big Band Era. Port Elgin and Southampton band shell concerts entertain music lovers throughout the summer. Concerts are held in various venues year round. http://www.canadianbigband.ca/
- Since 1957, thousands of students have explored their creativity at the Southampton Art School, one of Ontario's oldest, most respected seasonal art schools. From painting to sculpture, over 900 students attend classes from May to October. http://www.southamptonartschool.com/
- Each summer, the Shoreline Artists' annual Studio Tour provides a tantalizing glimpse into area artists' workspaces. For 40 years, the Annual Southampton Craft Show in July has drawn a wide variety of vendors. Other craft shows occur throughout the summer and the rest of the year. http://www.shorelineartists.com/

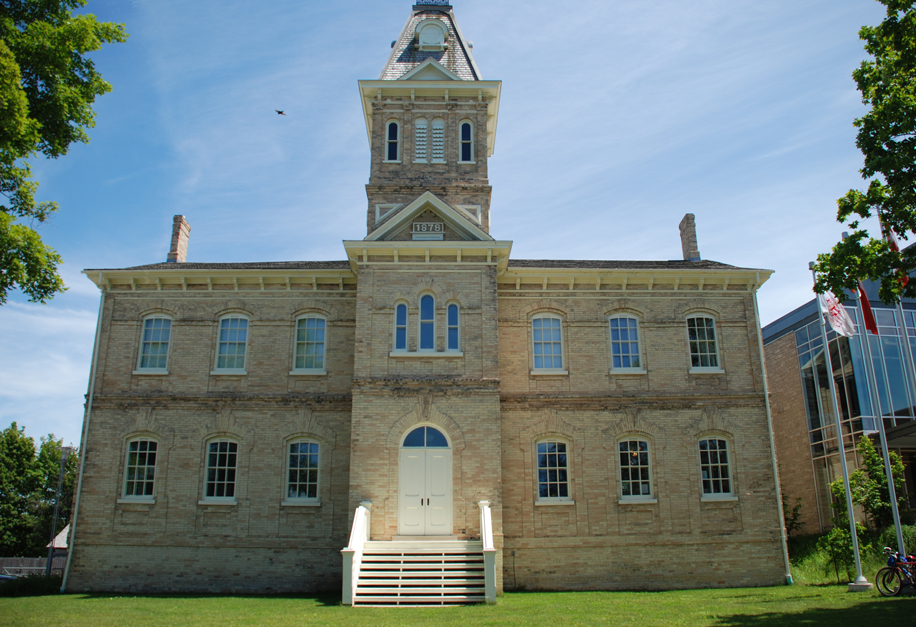
33 Victoria Street, the Old Public School, now part of the Bruce County Museum and Cultural Centre.

- Musicians of all ages participate in the week-long Southampton Summer Music Camp http://summermusic.com
- Saugeen Shores houses three public library branches (belonging to the Bruce County Public Library), one in Southampton, one in Port Elgin, and the Bruce County Public Library Headquarters located between the two communities along Highway 21.
- The Municipal Heritage Committee's goal is preserving the community's heritage and has implemented a successful "Heritage Property Plaque Program" and self-guided historic walking tours. The Bruce County Museum & Cultural Centre houses the County Archive and artifacts. The Chantry Island keepers' house and gardens have been restored and open seasonally for tours; the island is now a bird sanctuary. Many groups work to preserve the community's heritage, including the Generalogical, Historical, and Marine Heritage Societies.

== Notable people ==
Historically significant people with connections to what is now Saugeen Shores include the following:

- John Bell (explorer), originally from Scotland, was a Hudson's Bay Company fur trader and explorer who worked extensively in the Mackenzie District and in what is now the Yukon Territory. He established Fort McPherson, Northwest Territories. After retiring in 1860, he settled in Saugeen Township where he farmed until his death.
- Robert Hanbidge, a lawyer and politician from the area, became Lieutenant Governor of Saskatchewan in 1963.
- David Milne an artist, was born in Burgoyne but moved to Paisley at age 8. He became a school teacher and taught in the area before leaving to study art in New York in 1903. Many of his paintings are in the National Gallery of Canada's collection.

== See also ==
- Bruce County
- List of townships in Ontario
