= Murray Cardiff =

Canadian politician

Member of Parliament for Huron—Bruce
- In office 1980–1993
- Preceded by: Robert McKinley
- Succeeded by: Paul Steckle

Personal details
- Born: 10 June 1934 Grey Township, Ontario, Canada
- Died: 31 October 2013 (aged 79) Listowel, Ontario, Canada
- Party: Progressive Conservative
- Profession: Farmer

Murray Cardiff (10 June 1934 – 31 October 2013) was a Progressive Conservative party member of the House of Commons of Canada. He was born in Grey Township, Ontario and was a farmer by career.

He represented the Ontario riding of Huron—Bruce where he was first elected in the 1980 federal election. He won re-election in the 1984 and 1988 federal elections, therefore becoming a member in the 32nd, 33rd and 34th Canadian Parliaments.

Cardiff left federal politics after his defeat in the 1993 federal election to Paul Steckle of the Liberal party. He died in hospital at Listowel, Ontario on 31 October 2013.

He is the grandson of former member of parliament Elston Cardiff, who represented Huron-North and later Huron.

== Electoral record (partial) ==
1993 Canadian federal election: Huron—Bruce
Party	Candidate	Votes	%	±%	Expenditures
Liberal	Paul Steckle	21,845	44.11	–	$38,357
Progressive Conservative	Murray Cardiff	13,852	27.97		$43,681a
Reform	Len Lobb	10,464	21.13		$35,469
New Democratic	Tony McQuail	2,064	4.17		$16,652
Christian Heritage	Henry Zekveld	782	1.58		$2,364
Libertarian	Allan Dettweiler	272	0.55		$0
Natural Law	Rick Alexander	243	0.49		$0
Total valid votes/expense limit		49,522	100.00	–	$57,202
Total rejected ballots		307			
Turnout		49,829	72.52		
Electors on the lists		68,712			
a Does not include unpaid claims.
Source: Thirty-fifth General Election, 1993: official voting results, published by the Chief Electoral Officer of Canada. Financial figures taken from official contributions and expenses provided by Elections Canada.
