= John Warwick King =

Canadian politician

John W. King

Member of Parliament for Huron North
- In office December 1921 – January 1927
- Preceded by: James Bowman
- Succeeded by: George Spotton

Personal details
- Born: John Warwick King; 26 December 1856 Smiths Falls, Canada West
- Died: 14 January 1927 (aged 70) Bluevale, Ontario
- Party: Progressive
- Spouse(s): Annie Olive Schoales m. 8 August 1899
- Profession: farmer, teacher

John Warwick King (26 December 1856 – 14 January 1927) was a Progressive party member of the House of Commons of Canada. He was born in Smiths Falls, Canada West and became a farmer and teacher.

King attended public school at Bluevale. For 17 years he was a public school teacher in the province, then became an agriculturalist. King once served as treasurer Turnberry Township.

He was first elected to Parliament at the Huron North riding in the 1921 general election then re-elected there in 1925 and 1926.

King died on 14 January 1927 of a heart attack at his home in Bluevale, before the end of his term in the 16th Canadian Parliament. His wife, née Annie Olive Schoales, died in May 1926.
