= Huron—Bruce (federal electoral district) =

Federal electoral district in Ontario, Canada

Coordinates: 44.0°N 81.4°W

Ontario electoral district
- Interactive map of riding boundaries from the 2004 federal election

Federal electoral district
- Legislature: House of Commons
MP
Ben Lobb
Conservative
- District created: 1952
- First contested: 1953
- Last contested: 2021
- District webpage: profile, map

Demographics
- Population (2011): 104,842
- Electors (2015): 79,533
- Area (km²): 5,896
- Pop. density (per km²): 17.8
- Census division(s): Bruce, Huron
- Census subdivision(s): Saugeen Shores, Kincardine, South Huron, Brockton, Huron East, Goderich, Central Huron, Huron-Kinloss, Bluewater, Ashfield–Colborne–Wawanosh

Huron—Bruce (formerly known as Huron and Huron—Middlesex) is a federal electoral district in Ontario, Canada, that has been represented in the House of Commons of Canada since 1953.

== History ==
The riding was created in 1952 from parts of Huron North and Huron—Perth ridings. It consisted of the township of Hibbert in the county of Perth, and the townships of Hullett, McKillop, Stanley, Tuckersmith, Hay, Stephen, Usborne, Grey, Morris, Colborne, Goderich, Ashfield, East Wawanosh and West Wawanosh in the county of Huron.

In 1966, it was redefined to consist of the County of Huron excluding the Village of Lucknow, and the Village of Ailsa Craig and the Townships of Biddulph and McGillivray in the County of Middlesex.

It was known as "Huron" until 1974. It was known as "Huron—Middlesex" from 1974 to 1976.

In 1976, it was renamed "Huron—Bruce", and defined to consist of the County of Huron and the Townships of Carrick, Culross, Huron and Kinloss in the County of Bruce.

In 1987, the Bruce County portion was redefined as the part of the County of Bruce lying west of and excluding the townships of Carrick, Brant and Elderslie, west of and including the Village of Paisley, west of and excluding the Townships of Elderslie and Arran, and west of and including the Township of Saugeen and the Town of Southampton.

In 2003, the Bruce County portion was redefined as the part of the County of Bruce lying southwest of and excluding the Township of Arran-Elderslie, and west of and including the Town of Saugeen Shores.

This riding was left unchanged after the 2012 electoral redistribution and the 2022 electoral redistribution.

== Demographics ==
Canada census – Huron-Bruce community profile

	2021	2016	2011
Population	112,929 (6.0% from 2016)	106,570 (1.6% from 2011)	104,842 (0.5% from 2006)
Land area	5,598.50 km^{2} (2,161.59 sq mi)	5,601.68 km^{2} (2,162.82 sq mi)	5,601.94 km^{2} (2,162.92 sq mi)
Population density	20.2/km^{2} (52/sq mi)	19.1/km^{2} (49/sq mi)	18.7/km^{2} (48/sq mi)
Median age	46.0 (M: 44.8, F: 47.6)	46.5 (M: 45.4, F: 47.6)	45.6 (M: 44.6, F: 46.5)
Private dwellings	55,077 (total)	52,577 (total)	51,450 (total)
Median household income	$86,000	$71,410

Notes: NHS Profile, Statistics Canada
References: 2021 2016 2011

Visible Minorities and Aboriginals
Group		2021 Census		2016 Census		2011 Census	
Group		Population	% of total	Population	% of total	Population	% of total
Aboriginal	First Nations	1,530	1.4	1,040	1.0	N/A	
Aboriginal	Métis	1,010	0.9	730	0.7	N/A	
Visible Minority		3,535	3.2	2,360	2.3	N/A	
All other		104,860	94.5	100,025	96.0	N/A	
Total		110,935	100.0	104,155	100.0	N/A	

Population by mother tongue
Group	2021 Census		2016 Census		2011 Census	
Group	Population	% of total	Population	% of total	Population	% of total
English	101,055	90.4	95,540	91.0	94,325	91.1
French	850	0.8	855	0.8	950	0.9
English and French	270	0.2	145	0.1	120	0.1
All other	9,590	8.6	8,440	8.1	8,105	7.9
Total	111,765	100.0	104,980	100.0	103,500	100.0

Mobility over previous five years
Group	2021 Census		2016 Census		2011 Census	
Group	Population	% of total	Population	% of total	Population	% of total
At the same address	69,755	66.8	69,020	70.4	N/A	
In the same constituency	9,775	9.3	12,470	12.7	N/A	
In the same province	22,760	21.8	15,110	15.4	N/A	
From another province	1,190	1.1	750	0.8	N/A	
From another country	1,005	1.0	680	0.7	N/A	
Total aged 5 or over	104,485	100.0	98,030	100.0	N/A	

== Members of Parliament ==
This riding has elected the following members of Parliament:

Parliament	Years	Member	Party
Huron; Riding created from Huron North and Huron—Perth
22nd	1953–1957	Elston Cardiff	Progressive Conservative
23rd	1957–1958	Elston Cardiff	Progressive Conservative
24th	1958–1962	Elston Cardiff	Progressive Conservative
25th	1962–1963	Elston Cardiff	Progressive Conservative
26th	1963–1965	Elston Cardiff	Progressive Conservative
27th	1965–1968	Robert McKinley	Progressive Conservative
28th	1968–1972	Robert McKinley	Progressive Conservative
29th	1972–1974	Robert McKinley	Progressive Conservative
Huron—Middlesex
30th	1974–1979	Robert McKinley	Progressive Conservative
Huron—Bruce
31st	1979–1980	Robert McKinley	Progressive Conservative
32nd	1980–1984	Murray Cardiff	Progressive Conservative
33rd	1984–1988	Murray Cardiff	Progressive Conservative
34th	1988–1993	Murray Cardiff	Progressive Conservative
35th	1993–1997	Paul Steckle	Liberal
36th	1997–2000	Paul Steckle	Liberal
37th	2000–2004	Paul Steckle	Liberal
38th	2004–2006	Paul Steckle	Liberal
39th	2006–2008	Paul Steckle	Liberal
40th	2008–2011	Ben Lobb	Conservative
41st	2011–2015	Ben Lobb	Conservative
42nd	2015–2019	Ben Lobb	Conservative
43rd	2019–2021	Ben Lobb	Conservative
44th	2021–2025	Ben Lobb	Conservative
45th	2025–present	Ben Lobb	Conservative

== Election results ==
View source data.
Graph of election results in Huron—Bruce (minor parties that never got 2% of the vote or didn't run consistently are omitted)

=== Huron—Bruce (1976–present) ===
2025 Canadian federal election
Party	Candidate	Votes	%	±%	Expenditures
Conservative	Ben Lobb	37,027	53.2	+2.20	
Liberal	James Rice	28,936	41.5	+15.34	
New Democratic	Melanie Burrett	2,300	3.3	–11.44	
Green	Gregory J McLean	927	1.3	N/A	
Independent	Justin L Smith	273	0.4	–0.46	
Independent	Caesar salad Pella	194	0.3	N/A	
Total valid votes/expense limit		69,657	99.5	+0.1	
Total rejected ballots		352	0.5	-0.1	
Turnout		70,009	76.1	+6.1	
Eligible voters		92,013			
Conservative hold		Swing		–6.57	
Source: Elections Canada

2021 Canadian federal election
Party	Candidate	Votes	%	±%	Expenditures
Conservative	Ben Lobb	31,170	50.9	+2.4	$83,925.78
Liberal	James Rice	16,015	26.2	-6.9	$96,832.95
New Democratic	Jan Johnstone	9,056	14.8	+2.6	$23,930.53
People's	Jack Stecho	4,437	7.3	+5.5	$509.89
Independent	Justin L. Smith	519	0.8	N/A	$2,279.23
Total valid votes/expense limit		61,197	99.4	–	$116,852.78
Total rejected ballots		357	0.6		
Turnout		61,554	70.0		
Eligible voters		87,978			
Conservative hold		Swing		+4.7	
Source: Elections Canada

2019 Canadian federal election
Party	Candidate	Votes	%	±%	Expenditures
Conservative	Ben Lobb	29,512	48.5	+3.56	none listed
Liberal	Allan Thompson	20,167	33.1	-6.61	$82,810.20
New Democratic	Tony McQuail	7,421	12.2	-0.75	$25,745.80
Green	Nicholas Wendler	2,665	4.4	+2.00	$0.00
People's	Kevin M. Klerks	1,102	1.8		$2,074.00
Total valid votes/expense limit		60,867	100.0		
Total rejected ballots		398			
Turnout		61,265	71.1		
Eligible voters		86,147			
Conservative hold		Swing		+5.09	
Source: Elections Canada

2015 Canadian federal election
Party	Candidate	Votes	%	±%	Expenditures
Conservative	Ben Lobb	26,174	44.94	-10.01	$148,259.85
Liberal	Allan Thompson	23,129	39.71	+23.21	$65,446.81
New Democratic	Gerard Creces	7,544	12.95	-12.39	$53,256.52
Green	Jutta Splettstoesser	1,398	2.40	-0.33	$3,499.97
Total valid votes/Expense limit		58,245	100.00		$215,527.47
Total rejected ballots		232	0.40		
Turnout		58,477	72.77		
Eligible voters		80,355			
Conservative hold		Swing		-16.61	
Source: Elections Canada

2011 Canadian federal election
Party	Candidate	Votes	%	±%	Expenditures
Conservative	Ben Lobb	29,255	54.95	+10.1	–
New Democratic	Grant Robertson	13,493	25.34	+10.3	–
Liberal	Charlie Bagnato	8,784	16.50	-16.5	–
Green	Eric Shelley	1,455	2.73	-2.6	–
Independent	Dennis Valenta	254	0.48	0.0	–
Total valid votes		53,241	100.0	–	
Total rejected ballots		247	0.5	–	
Turnout		53,488	68.8	–	
Eligible voters		77,743	–	–	

2008 Canadian federal election
Party	Candidate	Votes	%	±%	Expenditures
Conservative	Ben Lobb	22,202	44.8	+6.8	$59,966
Liberal	Greg McClinchey	16,346	33.0	-5.0	$74,928
New Democratic	Tony McQuail	7,426	15.0	-1.3	$37,499
Green	Glen Smith	2,617	5.3	+1.9	
Christian Heritage	Dave Joslin	747	1.5	-0.4	$5,359
Independent	Dennis Valenta	242	0.5	0.0	$3,622
Total valid votes/Expense limit		49,580	100.0	$83,704	

2006 Canadian federal election
Party	Candidate	Votes	%	±%
Liberal	Paul Steckle	21,260	39.8	-10.0
Conservative	Ben Lobb	20,289	38.0	+6.9
New Democratic	Grant Robertson	8,696	16.3	3.2
Green	Victoria Serda	1,829	3.4	+0.4
Christian Heritage	Dave Joslin	1,019	1.9	0.0
Independent	Dennis Valenta	270	0.5	
Total valid votes		53,363	100.0	

2004 Canadian federal election
Party	Candidate	Votes	%	±%
Liberal	Paul Steckle	25,538	49.8	-0.1
Conservative	Barb Fisher	15,930	31.1	-11.7
New Democratic	Grant Robertson	6,707	13.1	+6.9
Green	Dave Vasey	1,518	3.0	
Christian Heritage	Dave Joslin	958	1.9	+1.3
Marijuana	Glen Smith	638	1.2	
Total valid votes		51,289	100.0	

Note: Conservative vote is compared to the total of the Canadian Alliance vote and Progressive Conservative vote in 2000 election.

2000 Canadian federal election
Party	Candidate	Votes	%	±%
Liberal	Paul Steckle	21,547	49.9	-1.4
Alliance	Mark Beaven	10,343	24.0	+2.9
Progressive Conservative	Ken Kelly	8,138	18.9	-0.7
New Democratic	Christine Kemp	2,669	6.2	-0.3
Independent	Dave Joslin	249	0.6	-1.1
Canadian Action	Philip Holley	225	0.5	
Total valid votes		43,171	100.0	

Note: Canadian Alliance vote is compared to the Reform vote in 1997 election.

1997 Canadian federal election
Party	Candidate	Votes	%	±%
Liberal	Paul Steckle	24,240	51.3	+7.6
Reform	Doug Fines	9,925	21.0	+0.1
Progressive Conservative	Colleen Schenk	9,223	19.5	-8.2
New Democratic	Jan Johnstone	3,037	6.4	+2.2
Christian Heritage	Dave Joslin	781	1.7	-0.3
Total valid votes		47,206	100.0	

1993 Canadian federal election
Party	Candidate	Votes	%	±%
Liberal	Paul Steckle	21,629	43.8	+8.4
Progressive Conservative	Murray Cardiff	13,714	27.8	-14.8
Reform	Len Lobb	10,357	21.0	
New Democratic	Tony McQuail	2,093	4.2	-12.2
Christian Heritage	Henry Zekveld	953	1.9	-3.7
Libertarian	Allan Dettweiler	404	0.8	
Natural Law	Rick Alexander	242	0.5	
Total valid votes		49,392	100.0	

1988 Canadian federal election
Party	Candidate	Votes	%	±%
Progressive Conservative	Murray Cardiff	20,042	42.6	-22.2
Liberal	Ken Dunlop	16,629	35.3	+11.6
New Democratic	Tony McQuail	7,746	16.5	+5.5
Christian Heritage	Tom Clark	2,633	5.6	
Total valid votes		47,050	100.0	

1984 Canadian federal election
Party	Candidate	Votes	%	±%
Progressive Conservative	Murray Cardiff	23,969	64.8	+17.2
Liberal	Bruce McDonald	8,802	23.8	-17.6
New Democratic	Valerie Bolton	4,075	11.0	-0.1
Libertarian	Joe Yundt	158	0.4	
Total valid votes		37,004	100.0	

1980 Canadian federal election
Party	Candidate	Votes	%	±%
Progressive Conservative	Murray Cardiff	16,520	47.5	-11.7
Liberal	Graeme Craig	14,364	41.3	+8.2
New Democratic	Tony McQuail	3,864	11.1	+3.5
Total valid votes		34,748	100.0	

1979 Canadian federal election
Party	Candidate	Votes	%	±%
Progressive Conservative	Robert E. McKinley	21,122	59.2	0.0
Liberal	Graeme Craig	11,818	33.1	-1.7
New Democratic	Moira Couper	2,729	7.7	+1.7
Total valid votes		35,669	100.0	

=== Huron—Middlesex (1974–1976) ===
1974 Canadian federal election
Party	Candidate	Votes	%	±%
Progressive Conservative	Robert E. McKinley	17,186	59.2	-5.1
Liberal	John Lyndon	10,103	34.8	+5.7
New Democratic	Shirley Weary	1,752	6.0	-0.3
Total valid votes		29,041	100.0	

=== Huron (1952–1974) ===
1972 Canadian federal election
Party	Candidate	Votes	%	±%
Progressive Conservative	Robert E. McKinley	18,921	64.3	+9.7
Liberal	Charles H. Thomas	8,570	29.1	-11.8
New Democratic	Shirley Weary	1,852	6.3	+1.8
Independent	T. Edward Bain	85	0.3	
Total valid votes		29,428	100.0	

1968 Canadian federal election
Party	Candidate	Votes	%	±%
Progressive Conservative	Robert E. McKinley	14,652	54.6	+5
Liberal	Maitland E. Edgar	10,960	40.9	-3.4
New Democratic	Shirley M. Weary	1,212	4.5	-1.6
Total valid votes		26,824	100.0	

1965 Canadian federal election
Party	Candidate	Votes	%	±%
Progressive Conservative	Robert E. McKinley	10,670	49.6	-5
Liberal	Mait Edgar	9,537	44.3	-1.1
New Democratic	J. Carl Hemingway	1,311	6.1	
Total valid votes		21,518	100.0	

1963 Canadian federal election
Party	Candidate	Votes	%	±%
Progressive Conservative	Elston Cardiff	12,224	54.6	+2.9
Liberal	Gordon McGavin	10,169	45.4	+4.3
Total valid votes		22,393	100.0	

1962 Canadian federal election
Party	Candidate	Votes	%	±%
Progressive Conservative	Elston Cardiff	11,562	51.7	-13.4
Liberal	Ernie Fisher	9,177	41.1	+6.2
New Democratic	J. Carl Hemingway	1,148	5.1	
Social Credit	Earl Dougals	466	2.1	
Total valid votes		22,353	100.0	

1958 Canadian federal election
Party	Candidate	Votes	%	±%
Progressive Conservative	Elston Cardiff	14,108	65.1	+6.9
Liberal	William G.Cochrane	7,550	34.9	-6.9
Total valid votes		21,658	100.0	

1957 Canadian federal election
Party	Candidate	Votes	%	±%
Progressive Conservative	Elston Cardiff	12,323	58.2	+5.9
Liberal	Andrew Y. McLean	8,860	41.8	-5.9
Total valid votes		21,183	100.0	

1953 Canadian federal election
Party	Candidate	Votes	%
Progressive Conservative	Elston Cardiff	11,045	52.3
Liberal	Andrew Y. McLean	10,092	47.7
Total valid votes		21,137	100.0

== See also ==
- List of Canadian electoral districts
- Historical federal electoral districts of Canada
