= Joseph Whitehead (Canadian politician) =

Canadian politician

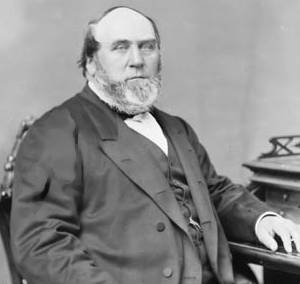
Joseph Whitehead Source: Library and Archives Canada

Joseph Whitehead (1814 – March 12, 1894) was a Canadian railway pioneer and political figure. He represented Huron North in the 1st Canadian Parliament as a Liberal member.

He was born in Guisborough, Yorkshire, England in 1814. Whitehead was a fireman and engineer on railways in Britain, serving as fireman for George Stephenson's Locomotion in 1825. He later became involved in railway construction, helping to build the Caledonian Railway in Scotland. He came to Canada West in 1850 and helped build sections of the Great Western Railway and a section of the Grand Trunk Railway between Buffalo and Goderich. He also served as mayor for the town of Clinton, Ontario. Whitehead won contracts to build two sections of the transcontinental railway, the section between Cross Lake and Kenora and a branch line between Emerson and Saint Boniface, Manitoba. He built a sawmill at Saint Boniface to supply lumber during construction of the rail line. In 1877, he brought the first steam locomotive to Manitoba, The Countess of Dufferin, transporting it by boat up the Red River to Winnipeg. For a time, he worked in the timber trade in Manitoba, but later retired to Clinton, where his descendants still live as of 2018. He died there in 1894.

Parliament of Canada
Preceded by The electoral district was created by the British North America Act, 1867.	Member of Parliament for Huron North; 1867–1872	Succeeded by Thomas Farrow
