= MacGregor Point Provincial Park =

Provincial park in Ontario, Canada

- IUCN category II (national park)
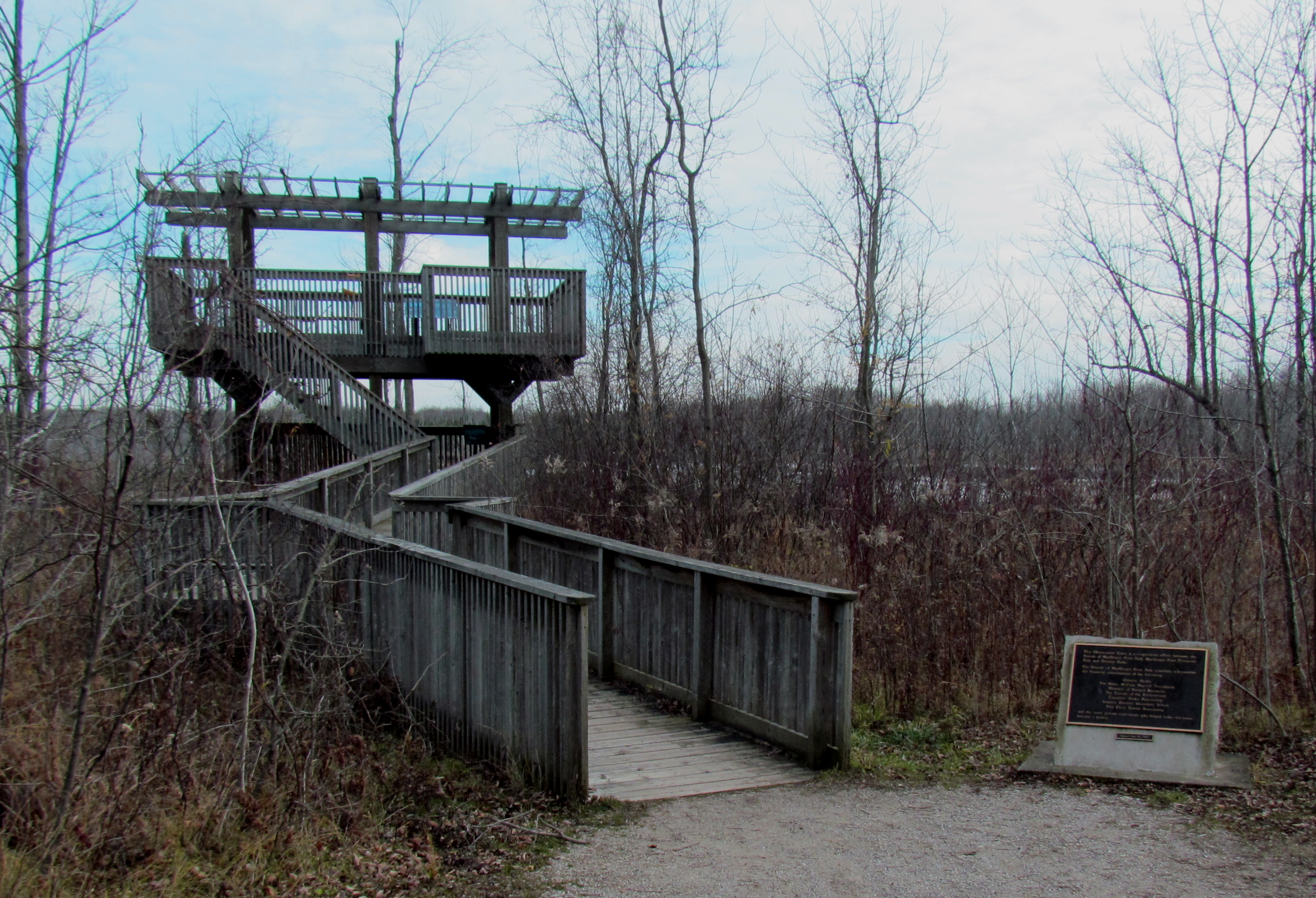
- Observation Tower for bird watching

- Location within Southern Ontario
- Interactive map of MacGregor Point Provincial Park
- Location: MacGregor Point, Lake Huron
- Nearest city: Port Elgin, Ontario
- Coordinates: 44°24′31″N 81°26′45″W
- Area: 12.04 km^{2} (4.65 sq mi)
- Established: 1975
- Visitors: 216,994 (in 2022)
- Governing body: Ontario Parks
- Website: ontarioparks.ca/park/macgregorpoint

MacGregor Point Provincial Park is a park located on Lake Huron, off of Bruce Road 33 near Port Elgin, Ontario, Canada.

The varied habitat found within the park includes a seven-kilometre stretch of coast, coastal wetlands, forests, and dunes. Although the beaches in the park can be used for swimming, better beaches can be found at Port Elgin or nearby Inverhuron Provincial Park. Recreational activities include hiking, cycling, canoeing, and kayaking. Some carnivorous plants grow in the park. Rare dwarf lake iris and the elusive spotted turtle appear in the spring. Migrating birds, including the black-crowned night heron and the great egret, have been spotted as well.

The park is an all-season destination for camping, hiking, swimming, wildlife and bird watching. In winter, visitors can camp in yurts, cross-country ski, hike, or go skating.

Yurt camping is available in this park in the Birch Boulevard section of Algonquin Campground along with regular electrical sites that are available year-round.

At the end of May and beginning of June, the Huron Fringe Birding Festival is held in the park.

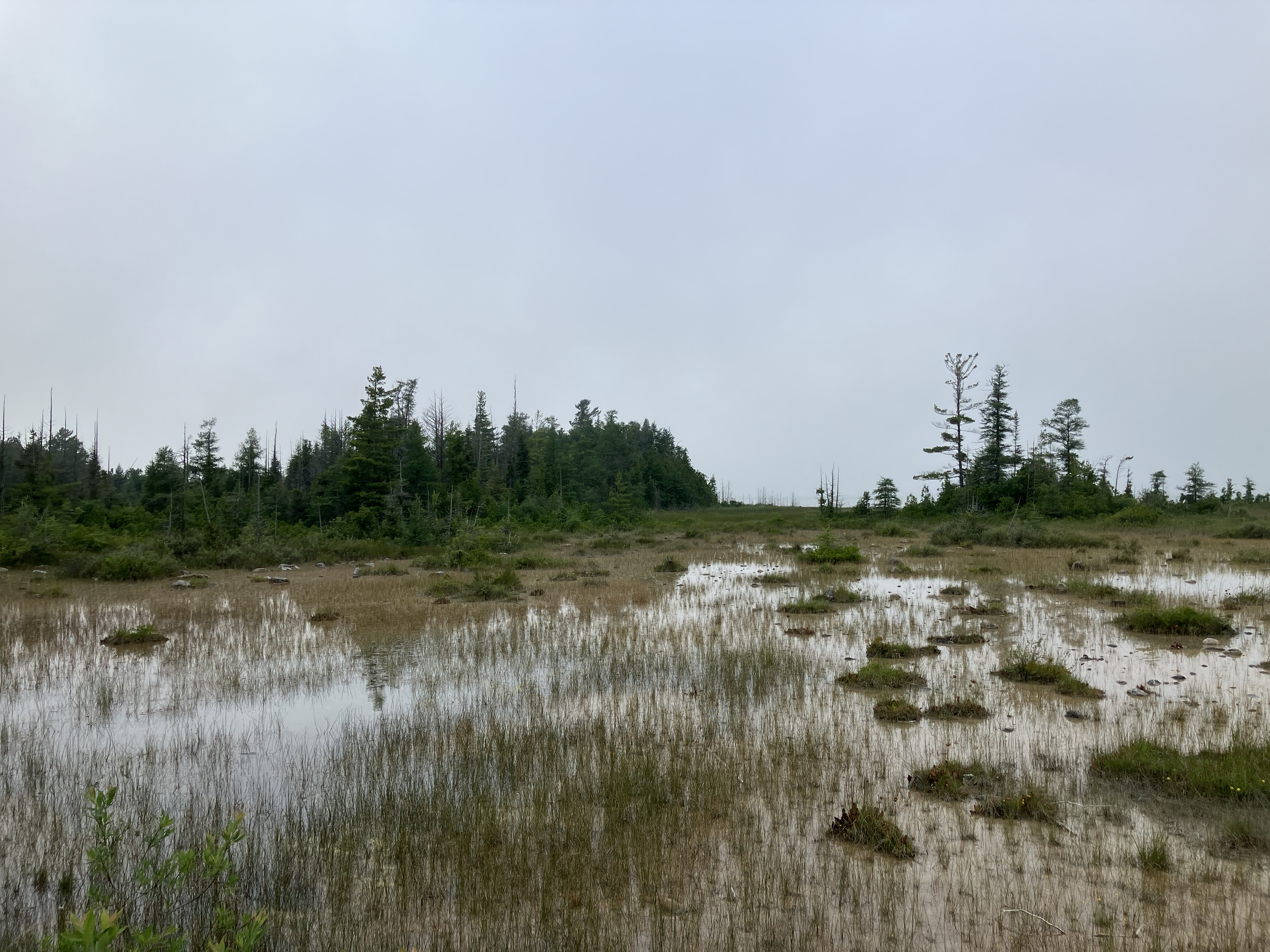
Pitcher Plant Marl at MacGregor Point Provincial Park

This provincial park was created in 1975 after nearby Inverhuron Provincial Park was initially closed. The majority of the facilities in the park were developed over the last half of the 1970s including the visitor center, which is due for expansion in the near future. The full list of facilities is as follows: Camping, Electrical Campsites, Flush Toilets, Laundry, Showers, Day Use Area, Group Camping, Playground, Park Store, Visitor Centre.
