= Ben Lobb =

Canadian politician (born 1976)

Ben Lobb MP
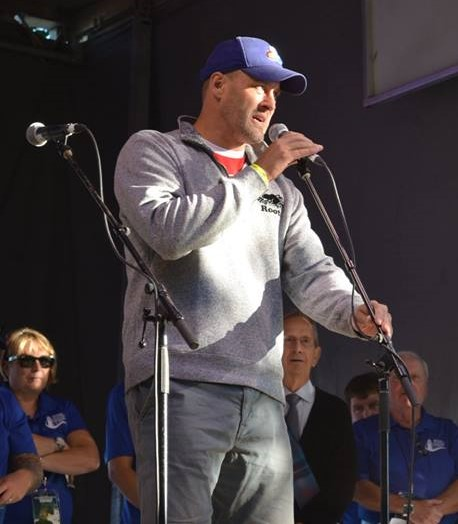

Member of Parliament for Huron—Bruce
- Incumbent
- Assumed office October 14, 2008
- Preceded by: Paul Steckle

Personal details
- Born: September 10, 1976 (age 50) Huron County, Ontario, Canada
- Party: Conservative
- Education: Lee University

Benjamin Thomas Lobb MP (born September 10, 1976) is a Canadian politician, who has represented the federal riding of Huron-Bruce in the House of Commons since 2008. He is a member of the Conservative Party of Canada.

== Early life ==
Ben was born and raised in Clinton, Ontario. He attended Lee University in Cleveland, Tennessee where he earned his B.Sc. in business administration.

Prior to being elected, Lobb worked in the Finance Department for D2L and also at Wescast Industries in Wingham, Ontario.

== Political career ==
Lobb was first elected to the Canadian House of Commons in 2008 and has subsequently been re-elected in 2011, 2015, 2019, 2021, and 2025. Since first being elected, Lobb has served on a number of committees, including as Chair of the Standing Committee on Health. Lobb was named the Shadow Minister for Digital Government on October 13, 2022 by Conservative Leader Pierre Poilievre.

In February 2021, Lobb was the sole Conservative MP to vote in favour of an NDP-proposed motion to take a first step towards developing a national pharmacare system. The bill, proposed by Peter Julian, would have established the conditions for federal financial contributions to provincial drug insurance plans.

In the 44th Parliament, Lobb introduced Private Member's Bill, C-234 also known as An Act to amend the Greenhouse Gas Pollution Pricing Act. Lobb's Bill sought to remove the carbon tax off propane and natural gas for agriculture functions such as heating livestock barns and drying grains. The Bill progressed to the Senate and was returned to the House of Commons with amendments, but died with the prorogation of Parliament. Lobb also jointly-seconded Bill C-350, An Act to amend the State Immunity Act, the Criminal Code and the Immigration and Refugee Protection Act.

Each summer, Lobb runs a minor baseball camp for youth in his riding to foster their skills development in the sport. The two-day camps in Clinton and Kincardine regularly have a headlining instructor who previously played in MLB.

At the time of the 2025 Canadian federal election, he lived in Point Clark, Ontario.

== Electoral record ==
2025 Canadian federal election: Huron—Bruce
Party	Candidate	Votes	%	±%	Expenditures
Conservative	Ben Lobb	37,027	53.2	+2.20	
Liberal	James Rice	28,936	41.5	+15.34	
New Democratic	Melanie Burrett	2,300	3.3	–11.44	
Green	Gregory J McLean	927	1.3	N/A	
Independent	Justin L Smith	273	0.4	–0.46	
Independent	Caesar salad Pella	194	0.3	N/A	
Total valid votes/expense limit		69,657	99.5	+0.1	
Total rejected ballots		352	0.5	-0.1	
Turnout		70,009	76.1	+6.1	
Eligible voters		92,013			
Conservative hold		Swing		–6.57	
Source: Elections Canada

2021 Canadian federal election: Huron—Bruce
Party	Candidate	Votes	%	±%	Expenditures
Conservative	Ben Lobb	31,170	50.9	+2.4	$83,925.78
Liberal	James Rice	16,015	26.2	-6.9	$96,832.95
New Democratic	Jan Johnstone	9,056	14.8	+2.6	$23,930.53
People's	Jack Stecho	4,437	7.3	+5.5	$509.89
Independent	Justin L. Smith	519	0.8	N/A	$2,279.23
Total valid votes/expense limit		61,197	99.4	–	$116,852.78
Total rejected ballots		357	0.6		
Turnout		61,554	70.0		
Eligible voters		87,978			
Conservative hold		Swing		+4.7	
Source: Elections Canada

2019 Canadian federal election: Huron—Bruce
Party	Candidate	Votes	%	±%	Expenditures
Conservative	Ben Lobb	29,512	48.5	+3.56	none listed
Liberal	Allan Thompson	20,167	33.1	-6.61	$82,810.20
New Democratic	Tony McQuail	7,421	12.2	-0.75	$25,745.80
Green	Nicholas Wendler	2,665	4.4	+2.00	$0.00
People's	Kevin M. Klerks	1,102	1.8		$2,074.00
Total valid votes/expense limit		60,867	100.0		
Total rejected ballots		398			
Turnout		61,265	71.1		
Eligible voters		86,147			
Conservative hold		Swing		+5.09	
Source: Elections Canada

2015 Canadian federal election
Party	Candidate	Votes	%	±%	Expenditures
Conservative	Ben Lobb	26,174	44.94	-10.01	–
Liberal	Allan Thompson	23,129	39.71	+23.21	–
New Democratic	Gerard Creces	7,544	12.95	-12.39	–
Green	Jutta Splettstoesser	1,398	2.40	-0.33	–
Total valid votes/Expense limit		58,245	100.00		$214,719.74
Total rejected ballots		232	0.40		
Turnout		58,477	72.77		
Eligible voters		80,355			
Conservative hold		Swing		-16.61	
Source: Elections Canada

2011 Canadian federal election
Party	Candidate	Votes	%	±%	Expenditures
Conservative	Ben Lobb	29,255	54.95	+10.1	–
New Democratic	Grant Robertson	13,493	25.34	+10.3	–
Liberal	Charlie Bagnato	8,784	16.50	-16.5	–
Green	Eric Shelley	1,455	2.73	-2.6	–
Independent	Dennis Valenta	254	0.48	0.0	–
Total valid votes		53,241	100.0	–	
Total rejected ballots		247	0.5	–	
Turnout		53,488	68.8	–	
Eligible voters		77,743	–	–	
Conservative hold		Swing		-0.1	

2008 Canadian federal election
Party	Candidate	Votes	%	±%	Expenditures
Conservative	Ben Lobb	22,202	44.8	+6.8	$59,966
Liberal	Greg McClinchey	16,346	33.0	-5.0	$74,928
New Democratic	Tony McQuail	7,426	15.0	-1.3	$37,499
Green	Glen Smith	2,617	5.3	+1.9	
Christian Heritage	Dave Joslin	747	1.5	-0.4	$5,359
Independent	Dennis Valenta	242	0.5	0.0	$3,622
Total valid votes/Expense limit		49,580	100.0	$83,704	
Conservative gain from Liberal		Swing		+5.9	

2006 Canadian federal election
Party	Candidate	Votes	%	±%
Liberal	Paul Steckle	21,260	39.8	-10.0
Conservative	Ben Lobb	20,289	38.0	+6.9
New Democratic	Grant Robertson	8,696	16.3	3.2
Green	Victoria Serda	1,829	3.4	+0.4
Christian Heritage	Dave Joslin	1,019	1.9	0.0
Independent	Dennis Valenta	270	0.5	
Total valid votes		53,363	100.0	
