= Paul Steckle =

Canadian politician

Paul Daniel Steckle

Member of Parliament for Huron—Bruce
- In office 25 October 1993 – 14 October 2008
- Preceded by: Murray Cardiff
- Succeeded by: Ben Lobb

Personal details
- Born: 10 May 1942 (age 83) Zurich, Ontario, Canada
- Party: Liberal
- Spouse: Kathy Steckle (d. 2025)
- Profession: Businessman, farmer

Paul Daniel Steckle (born 10 May 1942) is a former Canadian Member of Parliament for Huron—Bruce and a member of the Liberal Party of Canada.

== Political positions ==
Born in Zurich, Ontario, Steckle served as a Councillor in Stanley Township, Ontario from 1970 to 1980 and was subsequently elected as Reeve from 1980 to 1985. In 1993, Steckle was first elected to the House of Commons of Canada as a Liberal from the riding of Huron-Bruce in the 1993 election. He continued to represent the riding of Huron-Bruce until his retirement in 2008.

During his tenure, Steckle played a significant role in contributing to the committee process and served as a member on a number of different Standing Committees. Steckle also served in the role of Vice-Chair of the Standing Committee on Agriculture and Agri-Food and the Standing Committee on Fisheries and Oceans as well as Co-Chair and Chair of the Standing Committee on Agriculture and Agri-Food.

During the 35th Canadian Parliament, Steckle was opposed to Bill C-68, An Act Respecting Firearms and Other Weapons (now the Firearms Act). In opposition to this Bill, he stated in the House of Commons "that we have adequate controls in place but we are simply not enforcing them" and that "Canadians must bear the responsibility of using their firearms in a responsible manner. The Government of Canada should not be asked to shoulder this burden. We must congratulate firearms owners in this nation for their initiatives into the area of the safe handling of firearms, not condemn them for their efforts." Steckle was one of three Liberal backbenchers who voted with the opposition against Bill C-68 and as a result, Steckle was subsequently removed from his assignment on the Standing Committee of Agriculture and Agri-Food.

== Criticism ==
In 2004, Steckle mailed a controversial Christmas card which featured members of the Steckle family wearing camouflage hunting gear in front of a corn field sitting on and around two four-wheel-all-terrain vehicles while holding rifles. In response to the controversy surrounding the card, Steckle stated "I had to think, is this really a news issue? It must be a really slow news day." He further noted that "his family enjoys hunting and the photograph seemed like a natural choice." In an interview with the London Free Press, Steckle stated that the Christmas card "was never done with an intent to raise an issue."

== Controversial views ==
On many occasions in and outside of the House of Commons, Steckle reiterated his opposition to same-sex marriage indicating his support for the then current definition of marriage as between one man and one woman. On 4 June 2003, he called "upon Parliament to use all possible legislative and administrative measures, including invoking section 33 of the charter, the notwithstanding clause, if necessary, to preserve and protect the current definition of marriage as between one man and one woman." In 2005, Steckle voted against Bill C-38, An Act respecting certain aspects of legal capacity for marriage for civil purposes (now the Civil Marriage Act). Although Steckle remains an opponent of same-sex marriage, he has acknowledged that the legislation is unlikely to be changed stating that "[w]e’ve had that fight" and that "[t]he law is the law, and I have to accept that. I’m a legislator and I have to accept the majority rule." On 7 December 2006, Steckle voted in favour of a "Conservative motion to reopen the debate on the definition of marriage. The motion called on the government ‘to introduce legislation to restore the traditional definition of marriage without affecting civil unions and while respecting existing same-sex marriages.’"

In the first and second session of the 39th Canadian Parliament, Steckle introduced a Private Members Bill entitled Bill C-338, An Act to amend the Criminal Code (procuring a miscarriage after twenty weeks of gestation).

Steckle was a strong supporter of Steven Truscott and believed him to have been wrongly convicted. As a Member of Parliament he lobbied successive Ministers of Justice to reopen the case and Justice Minister Irwin Cotler eventually referred the matter to the Ontario Court of Appeal where Truscott was acquitted and the Court ruled that his conviction was a miscarriage of justice.

== Character ==
During his time as a Member of Parliament, Steckle was known for putting his constituents first and not simply voting along party lines. As a result, in the local media, this eventually earned him the title of being a maverick. "Priority: the People" was his self-proclaimed motto throughout his time as a federal Member of Parliament.

Over the years of his tenure, there was a recurring and false rumour that he might cross the floor to sit with the conservative party caucus. Steckle directly addressed the issue during the controversial same-sex marriage debate when he affirmed "he would ‘absolutely not’ consider crossing the floor." Steckle’s occasional willingness to vote against his own party on certain issues such as the gun registry, same-sex marriage and Canada's military role in Afghanistan may have contributed to this recurring rumour as he indicated that "‘up until 1993, very few MPs voted against their own party.’"

In 2007, Greg McClinchey, Steckle's former aide, published a biography on Paul Steckle, entitled Stickin’ to His Guns. The book is a "through-the-keyhole" look at the private elements of Paul Steckle’s public life.

On 6 March 2007, Steckle announced that he would not run for re-election.

== Electoral record (partial) ==
1993 Canadian federal election: Huron—Bruce
Party	Candidate	Votes	%	±%	Expenditures
Liberal	Paul Steckle	21,845	44.11	–	$38,357
Progressive Conservative	Murray Cardiff	13,852	27.97		$43,681a
Reform	Len Lobb	10,464	21.13		$35,469
New Democratic	Tony McQuail	2,064	4.17		$16,652
Christian Heritage	Henry Zekveld	782	1.58		$2,364
Libertarian	Allan Dettweiler	272	0.55		$0
Natural Law	Rick Alexander	243	0.49		$0
Total valid votes/expense limit		49,522	100.00	–	$57,202
Total rejected ballots		307			
Turnout		49,829	72.52		
Electors on the lists		68,712			
a Does not include unpaid claims.
Source: Thirty-fifth General Election, 1993: official voting results, published by the Chief Electoral Officer of Canada. Financial figures taken from official contributions and expenses provided by Elections Canada.
