= Port Elgin, Ontario =

Port Elgin
- Community
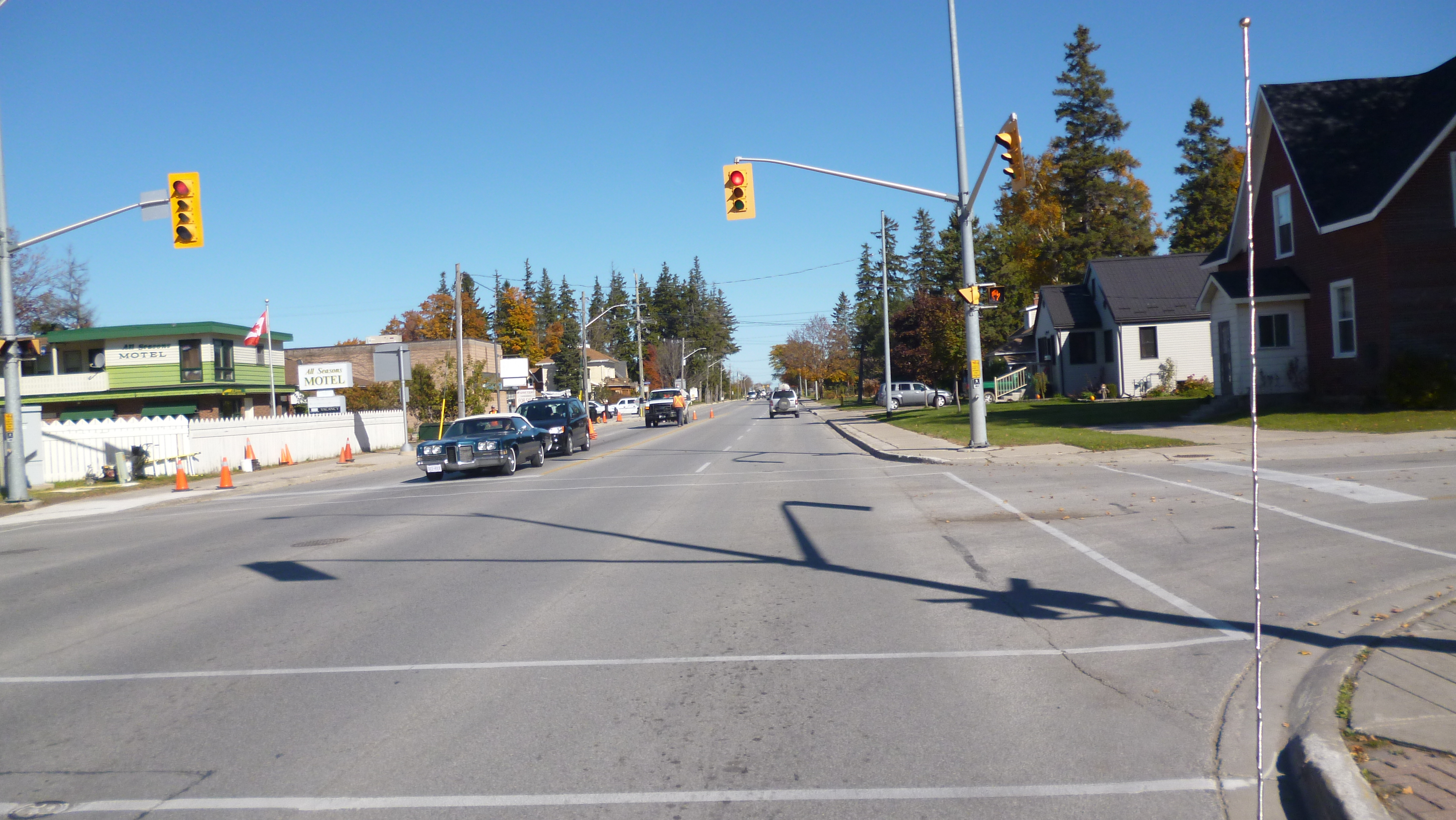

- Location within Bruce County Location within Southern Ontario
- Coordinates: 44°26′02″N 81°23′34″W
- Country: Canada
- Province: Ontario
- County: Bruce County
- Municipality: Saugeen Shores

Area
  - Total: 5.36 km^{2} (2.07 sq mi)

Population (2016)
  - Total: 7,862
- Time zone: UTC-5 (EST)
  - Summer (DST): UTC-4 (EDT)
- Postal codes: N0H 0A0 & N0H 2C0
- Area codes: (519) and (226)

Port Elgin is a community in the town of Saugeen Shores, Ontario, Canada. Originally named Normanton the town was renamed Port Elgin when it was incorporated in 1874, after James Bruce, 8th Earl of Elgin, a former Governor General of the Province of Canada.

Although road signs indicate the name Port Elgin, it is no longer an entity, per se. In 1998, the Town of Southampton, the Town of Port Elgin and Saugeen Township were amalgamated to form the Town of Port Elgin-Saugeen-Southampton. On December 17, 1998, the Province renamed the new municipality as the Town of Saugeen Shores.

Unlike "beach towns" such as Sauble Beach, this is a four seasons community where most businesses are open all year and activities for locals are available most months. The primary employment categories are agriculture, small business, tourism and work at the Bruce Power nuclear power station. Close to MacGregor Point Provincial Park and Southampton, the community has several beaches on Lake Huron.

Although the seasonal population is significantly higher due to the many cottages and campgrounds in the area, the permanent population was 6,880 in 2016 in the town's land area of 5.36 square kilometres according to the most recent Census.

== History ==
The area that is now Port Elgin was first settled in 1849, by Lachlan McLean ("Loch Buie") who first built a shanty and later ran a tavern, serving settlers and sailors passing through the little port. In spring 1852 George Butchart built a dam and saw-mill on Mill Creek.

According to a Government of Ontario historic plaque, Butchart sold the mill to Benjamin Shantz who subsequently built a grist-mill and within three years a community of 250 people had developed around these mills. Stores, hotels and tanneries were constructed and in March 1857, a village plot named Port Elgin was laid out. The enterprise of its businessmen, notably Henry Hilker, Samuel Bricker and John Stafford, contributed to the development of the settlement, which had a population of over 600 by 1867. The arrival of the Wellington, Grey and Bruce Railway in 1872 further stimulated the growth of the community and it was incorporated as a Village in 1874 with a population of about 950. Early industries included a steam sawmill, foundry, and woolen mill.

By 1869 the population was 650 and there was connection by steamship to Southampton and to Goderich. The first shipping pier was built in 1857. In 1873, the railway arrived, allowing Southampton and Port Elgin products to travel far from Lake Huron.

Agriculture prospered and the shipping industry benefitted from the natural harbour. Timber, coal, general merchandise and passengers arrived by ship. Warehouses for storing grain were constructed, and a tannery opened for business, becoming the second-largest in Ontario. By the 1880s, tourism was becoming a factor in the economy; passenger boats, largely from the U.S., began visiting this area. In the 1900s, industry in the area declined in the 1900s and the harbour began getting fewer ships as the other modes of transportation improved.

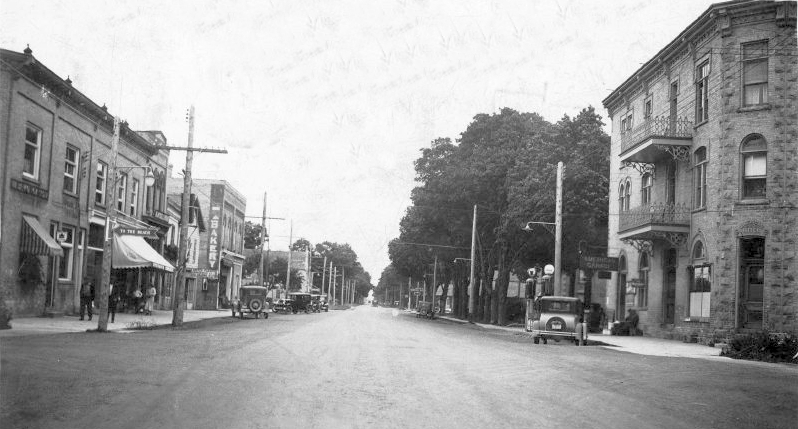
View of the north end of the business district of Port Elgin in 1933

Tourism became more important in the early 1900s. Development began to be directed in that direction; for example, the harbour was modified for pleasurecraft, the town was beautified and an increasing number of cottages were built. The library was built in 1908 with assistance from the Carnegie Fund, a secondary school was completed in 1889, with additions made in 1939. The school was replaced with a more modern structure in 1975.

The Government of Ontario also erected another historic plaque in Port Elgin, titled The "Nodwell" Indian Village Site. "This important Iroquoian village site was discovered about 1900, and named after the family which then owned the property. Subsequent archaeological examinations have uncovered a mid-14th century village, consisting of twelve longhouses, from 42 to 139 feet in length, protected by a double palisade. It was probably occupied for about 10 to 20 years by a group of some 500 people who were predecessors of the Huron and Petun Indians. Although primarily farmers who grew corn, tobacco and probably pumpkins and sunflowers, they also engaged in considerable fishing and hunting. A large number of artifacts have been retrieved from this site including fragments of pottery cooking vessels, smoking pipes, arrow heads, adzes, awls and netting needles."

=== Historical timeline, 1849 to 1906 ===
Although specific dates vary depending on the source, the following are excerpted from a reliable source, History of the County of Bruce, Ontario, Canada, by Norman Robertson, published in 1906.

- 1849: The first settler in the bush is Lachlan ("Loch Buie") McLean.
- 1852: George Butchart, an early Bruce pioneer, erects a dam and sawmill on Mill Creek.
- 1854: The first commercial store and post office are opened in the community called Normanton; other buildings include three houses, a tavern and an unfinished log house.
- 1855: A grist mill is completed. By now, the community consists of five houses and two taverns.
- 1856: A steam sawmill is erected by Samuel Bricker.
- 1857-58: A commercial pier is built by private enterprise for landing passengers and goods. (Previously, a large scow rowed out to steam ships in order to transport visitors and goods.) The piers of the harbor would continue expanding until at least 1899.
- 1859-60: A small foundry and brick works are opened. A woollen mill is already operating.
- 1866: The population is about 630. There are five churches, two schools, a large Town Hall, four stores, three hotels, a job printing office, a brewery, two tanneries, a woollen factory, a foundry, two sawmills, a grist mill, a pottery, many retailers of handicrafts and one physician.
- Circa 1869: Electric telegraph reaches the community.
- 1873: The village is incorporated on June 7, to be effective in 1874, with a population of 941. The name is changed from Normanton to Port Elgin. The railway has arrived and is helping to increase trade with other areas.
- 1889: The first high school opens.
- 1905: A large sawmill opens; work begins on a spur line from the railway station to the mill.
- 1906: Port Elgin is becoming more popular as a summer resort. "The splendid beach, the bracing breezes that blow from off Lake Huron, and the mineral spring and baths are attracting each season an increased number of visitors."

== Economy ==
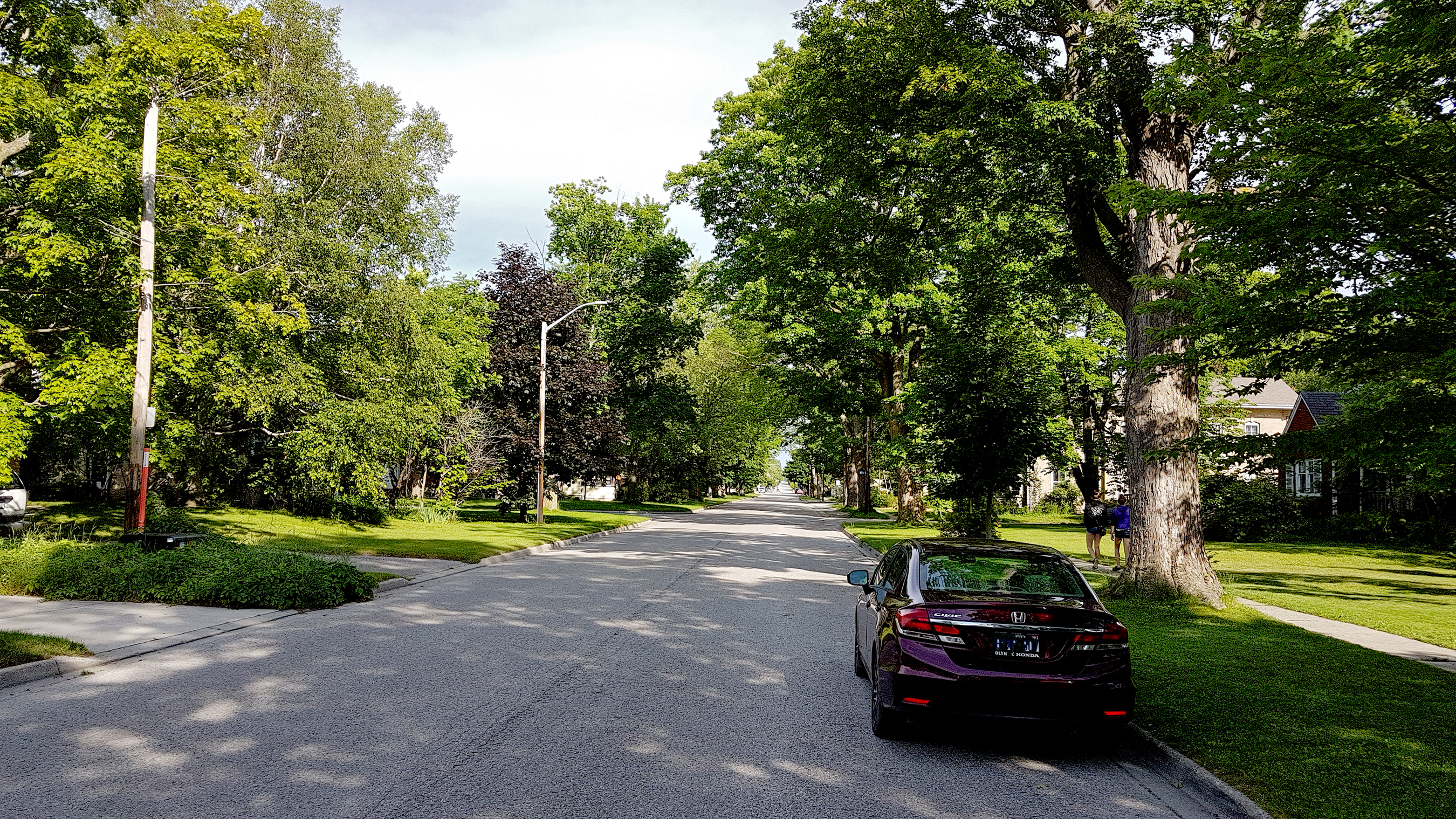
While tourism is the primary industry, the community has many year-round residents, some living on the tree-lined streets that run from downtown to the beach area

In addition to serving the many farmers in the area, the original economic development of Port Elgin during the 19th century was based on its harbour facilities on Lake Huron constructed in 1857–1858. This made the village a distribution centre for the surrounding agricultural region. The increasing urbanization of Ontario and the increased importance of the road network for transporting goods resulted in a declining economy and population. More recently, tourism and the nearby Bruce Nuclear Generating Station, which is a major employer of the workforce living in Saugeen Shores, have dominated the local economy.

The nuclear station in nearby Tiverton, Ontario started a $13 billion refurbishment program in 2016 which will provide employment for many residents and maintain demand for other services. According to Bruce Power, this multi-year plan "will generate between 1,500 and 2,500 jobs on site annually – and 18,000 across Ontario directly and indirectly – while injecting up to $4 billion annually into Ontario’s economy".

== Tourism ==
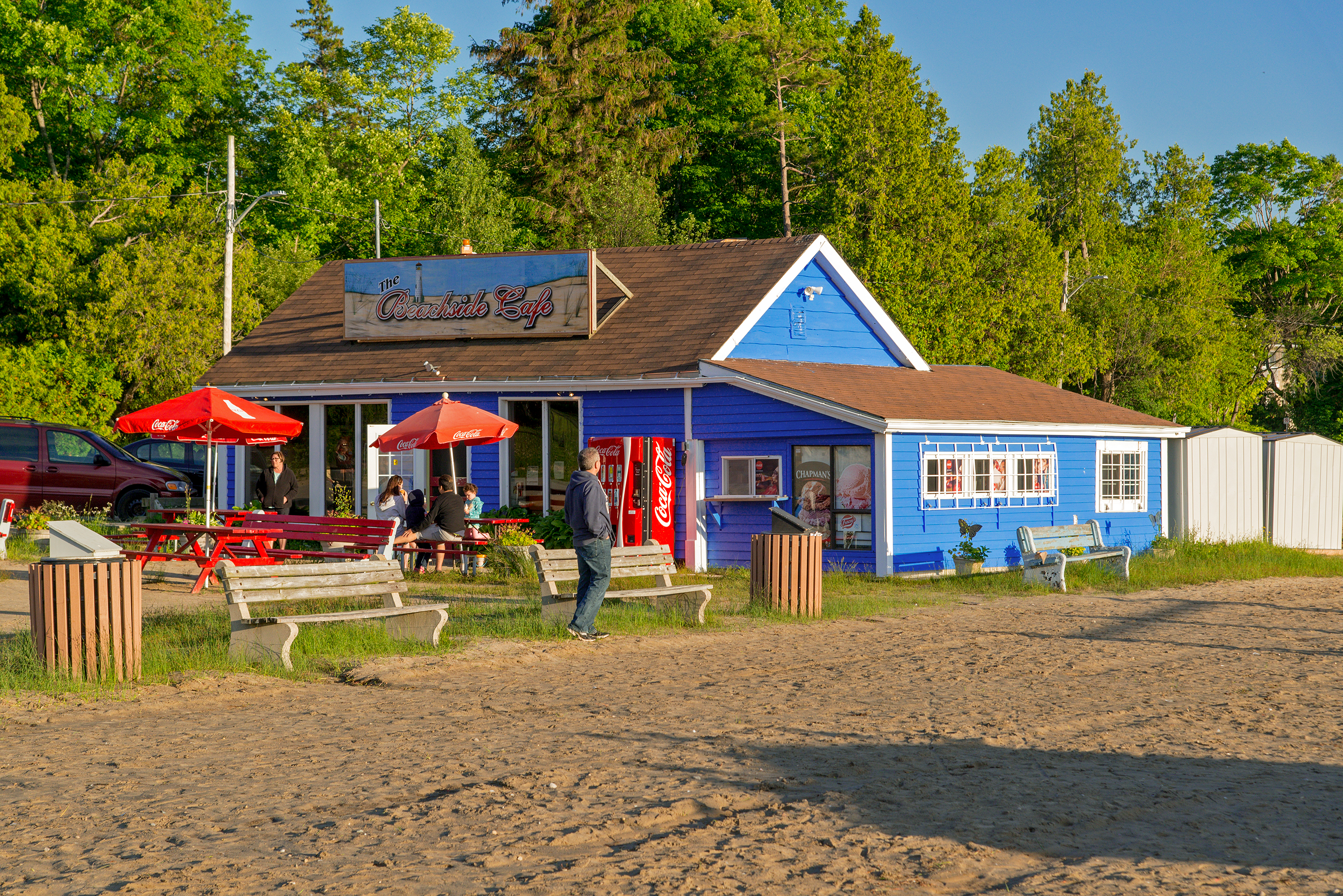
Most tourists visit to take advantage of the beach

The long, sandy beach attracts visitors who are primarily families; many rent or own cottages in the area. (Young singles tend to prefer Sauble Beach some 18 kilometres north of Southampton.) Port Elgin is renowned for its beautiful sunsets. There is a common urban legend in Port Elgin that National Geographic selected the town as having the world's best sunsets. This has since been proven wrong. However, in 2007 CBC Television held a competition to discover the Seven Wonders of Canada. While not being in the top seven, Saugeen Shores and its sunsets were one of the finalists. Cottage Life magazine also rates Port Elgin highly in its article 10 spectacular places to watch a sunset in Ontario. "With clear skies, a dry atmosphere, and an unobstructed view of the skyline, many of the west-facing towns along the shores of Lake Huron have the perfect conditions for a breathtaking sunset. Port Elgin, a Saugeen Shores community, has been earning rave reviews for years. For the best view, take a leisurely walk along the beach out to the harbour break wall."

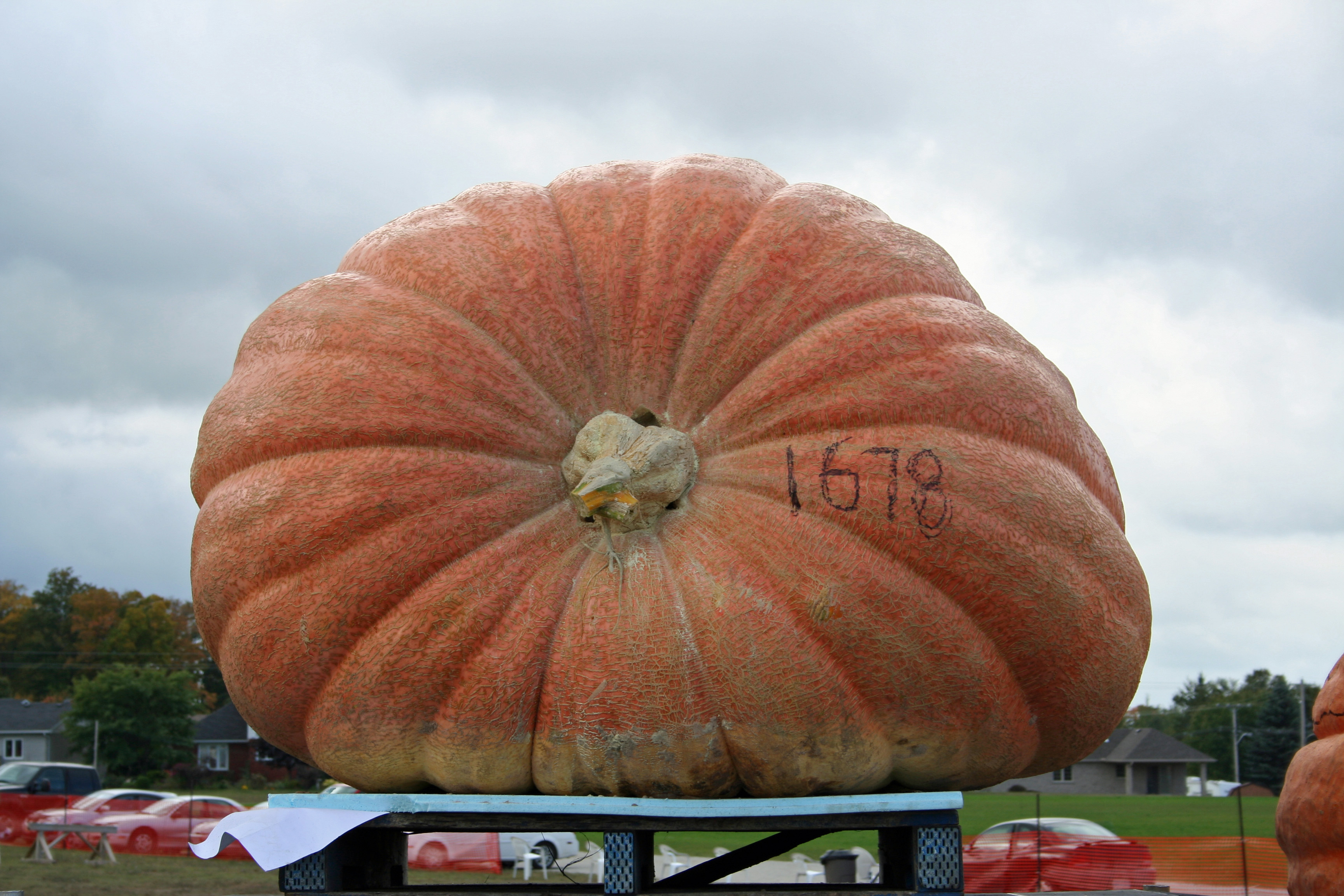
1,678 pounds (761 kg) pumpkin entered by Jane and Phil Hunt in the 2009 Port Elgin Pumpkinfest

Every year, on the first weekend in October, Port Elgin hosts a Pumpkinfest. Pumpkinfest is a competition between farmers to grow the largest pumpkin and other common farm crops. In 2004, a new record for the world's largest pumpkin (656 kg) was set at the festival. A new record (761 kg) was again set in 2009. The record was broken in 2016 with an 851 kg (1,877 lb.) vegetable. The previous Canadian record for a pumpkin was 824.86 kg (1818.5 lbs.). Pumpkinfest also features a large classic car show on both days of the festival. Pumpkinfest offers many activities for children, such as a junior fire fighter obstacle course, the kiddie carnival, and amusement rides.

The TripAdvisor travel web site recommends the nearby MacGregor Point Provincial Park, the Saugeen Rail Trail walking/cycling route, the Brucedale Conservation Area with small camp sites, and the several nearby golf courses.

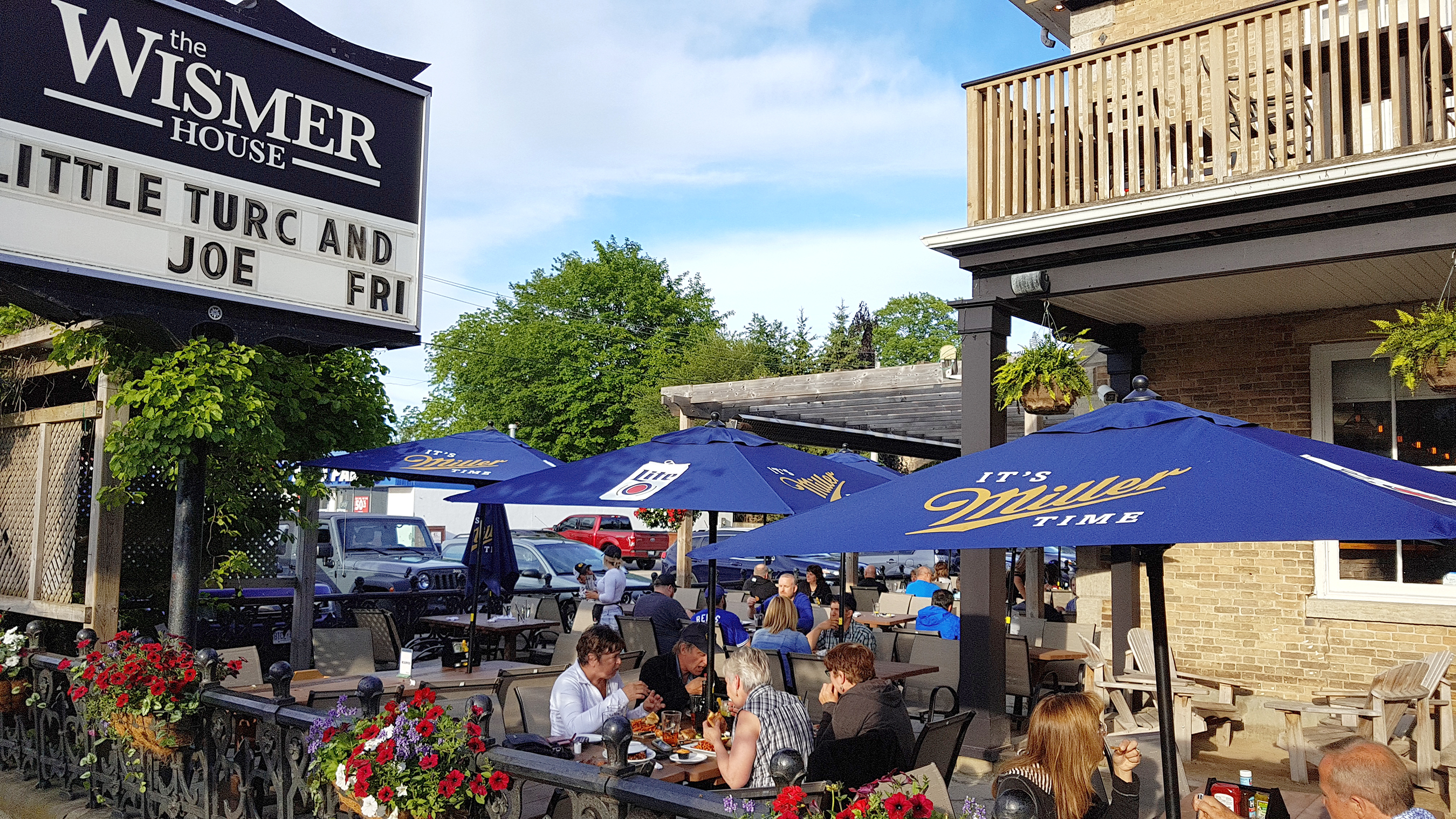
One of the many restaurants serving the numerous tourists during the warm months

MacGregor Point Provincial Park is an all-season destination for camping, hiking, swimming, wildlife and bird watching. In winter, visitors can camp in yurts, cross-country ski, hike, or go skating.

=== Saugeen RailTrail ===
After the railways ceased to service the area, the tracks were removed and the beds were vacant and overgrown. According to the Rail Trail Association, a group of volunteers founded the group in 1990 and convinced Port Elgin, Southampton and Saugeen Township to acquire sections of the then unused rail bed. Over the years, the bed has been developed as trails for walking and cycling. The trail connects Southampton and Port Elgin. The trail also connects to the 80 kilometre long Bruce County Trail Network which leads to towns such as Paisley, Walkerton, Mildmay and Kincardine.

The trailhead can be accessed at River Street in Port Elgin, a few blocks north of the town centre and east of Hwy 21. There are other access points in both towns, some with parking. The trail is not groomed for cross country skiing during the winter but is used frequently for that purpose. Maps of the trails are available on the web site of the Saugeen RailTrail Association.

== Health care ==
The Town of Saugeen Shores has one hospital, Saugeen Memorial in Southampton. Many Port Elgin physicians' practices are at the Dr Earl Health Centre. The hospital is part of the Grey Bruce Health Services' network of hospitals in northern Bruce and in Grey County. According to the Health Care services, facilities include 16 beds, a 24-hour emergency department, surgery, acute medical care and outpatient services.

== Media ==
- Cable television is provided by Eastlink TV and Bruce Telecom
- CFPS-FM 97.9 "The Bruce" - rock music
- CIYN-FM-2 90.9 "Shoreline Classics" - classic rock music
- CKNX-FM 101.7 "The One" - local, regional and national news and adult contemporary music
- CIBU-FM 94.5 "The Bull" - local, regional and national news and classic rock music

== Bus Transportation ==
- First Student Canada (buses from Kincardine/Port Elgin, Ontario)
- Ross Young Bus Lines (buses from Tiverton, Ontario) (serving the Bruce County area)

== Notable people ==
- Josh Cassidy - paralympian and record holder for wheelchair race at Boston Marathon
- Kevin Czuczman - NHL hockey player
- Louie DeBrusk - NHL hockey player
- Norm Locking - NHL hockey player
- Brett MacLean - NHL hockey player
- Adam Mitchell - professional hockey player
- Roy Roedger - hockey player
