= Huron East =

Former federal electoral district in Ontario, Canada

Ontario electoral district

Defunct federal electoral district
- Legislature: House of Commons
- District created: 1882
- District abolished: 1914
- First contested: 1882
- Last contested: 1911

Huron East was a federal electoral district represented in the House of Commons of Canada from 1882 to 1917. It was located in the province of Ontario. This riding was created from parts of Huron Centre, Huron North and Huron South ridings.

The East Riding of the county of Huron was initially defined to consist of the townships of Howick, Turnberry, Grey and Morris, the town of Wingham, and the villages of Brussels, Blyth and Wroxeter.

In 1903, it was expanded to include the township of Wawanosh East.

The electoral district was abolished in 1914 when it was merged into Huron North riding.

== Members of Parliament ==
This riding has elected the following members of Parliament:

Parliament	Years	Member	Party
Riding created from Huron Centre, Huron North and Huron South
5th	1882–1887	Thomas Farrow	Conservative
6th	1887–1891	Peter Macdonald	Liberal
7th	1891–1896	Peter Macdonald	Liberal
8th	1896–1900	Peter Macdonald	Liberal
9th	1900–1904	Peter Macdonald	Liberal
10th	1904–1908	Thomas Chisholm	Conservative
11th	1908–1911	Thomas Chisholm	Conservative
12th	1911–1917	James Bowman	Conservative
Riding dissolved into Huron North

== Election results ==
1882 Canadian federal election
Party	Candidate	Votes
Conservative	Thomas Farrow	1,631
Unknown	William Sloan	1,571

1887 Canadian federal election
Party	Candidate	Votes
Liberal	Peter Macdonald	2,088
Conservative	Thomas Farrow	2,027

1891 Canadian federal election
Party	Candidate	Votes
Liberal	Peter Macdonald	2,037
Conservative	Wm. J. R. Holmes	1,729

1896 Canadian federal election
Party	Candidate	Votes
Liberal	Peter Macdonald	2,079
Conservative	E. L. Dickinson	1,920

1900 Canadian federal election
Party	Candidate	Votes
Liberal	Peter Macdonald	2,002
Conservative	Edmund Lindsay Dickinson	1,862

1904 Canadian federal election
Party	Candidate	Votes
Conservative	Thomas Chisholm	2,189
Liberal	Peter Mcdonald	2,005

1908 Canadian federal election
Party	Candidate	Votes
Conservative	Thomas Chisholm	2,177
Liberal	Archibald Hislop	2,094

1911 Canadian federal election
Party	Candidate	Votes
Conservative	James Bowman	2,020
Liberal	Archibald Hislop	1,822

== See also ==
- List of Canadian electoral districts
- Historical federal electoral districts of Canada
