= Elston Cardiff =

Canadian politician

Lewis Elston Cardiff

Member of Parliament for Huron North
- In office March 1940 – August 1953
- Preceded by: Robert Deachman
- Succeeded by: Constituency abolished

Member of Parliament for Huron
- In office August 1953 – December 1965
- Preceded by: Constituency established
- Succeeded by: Robert McKinley

Personal details
- Born: 22 January 1889 Brussels, Ontario, Canada
- Died: 16 April 1969 (aged 80)
- Party: National Government; Progressive Conservative
- Profession: Farmer

Lewis Elston Cardiff (22 January 1889 – 16 April 1969) was a Progressive Conservative party member of the House of Commons of Canada. He was born in Brussels, Ontario and initially chose farming as his career.

From 1932 to 1940, Elston Cardiff was Reeve of Ontario's Morris Township. After this he entered federal politics with his election at the Huron North riding in the 1940 general election. He became a member of Parliament under the National Government party banner which was used by the Conservative Party at that time. Cardiff became a Progressive Conservative member when that party adopted this new name in 1942.

Cardiff was re-elected to successive Parliament terms at Huron North in 1945 and 1949. He was then re-elected in Huron riding after electoral district boundary changes, winning in 1953, 1957, 1958, 1962 and 1963. The 26th Canadian Parliament marked his final term in office and Cardiff did not seek another term in the 1965 election.

During his time in federal office, Cardiff was party Whip in 1957 and 1958. For two years from November 1959 he served as Parliamentary Secretary to the Minister of Agriculture, then from January to April 1962 as Parliamentary Secretary to the Minister of National Health and Welfare.

His grandson, Murray Cardiff later served as member for Huron—Bruce.
