= Zurich, Ontario =

Community in Ontario, Canada

Coordinates: 43.421445°N 81.625843°W

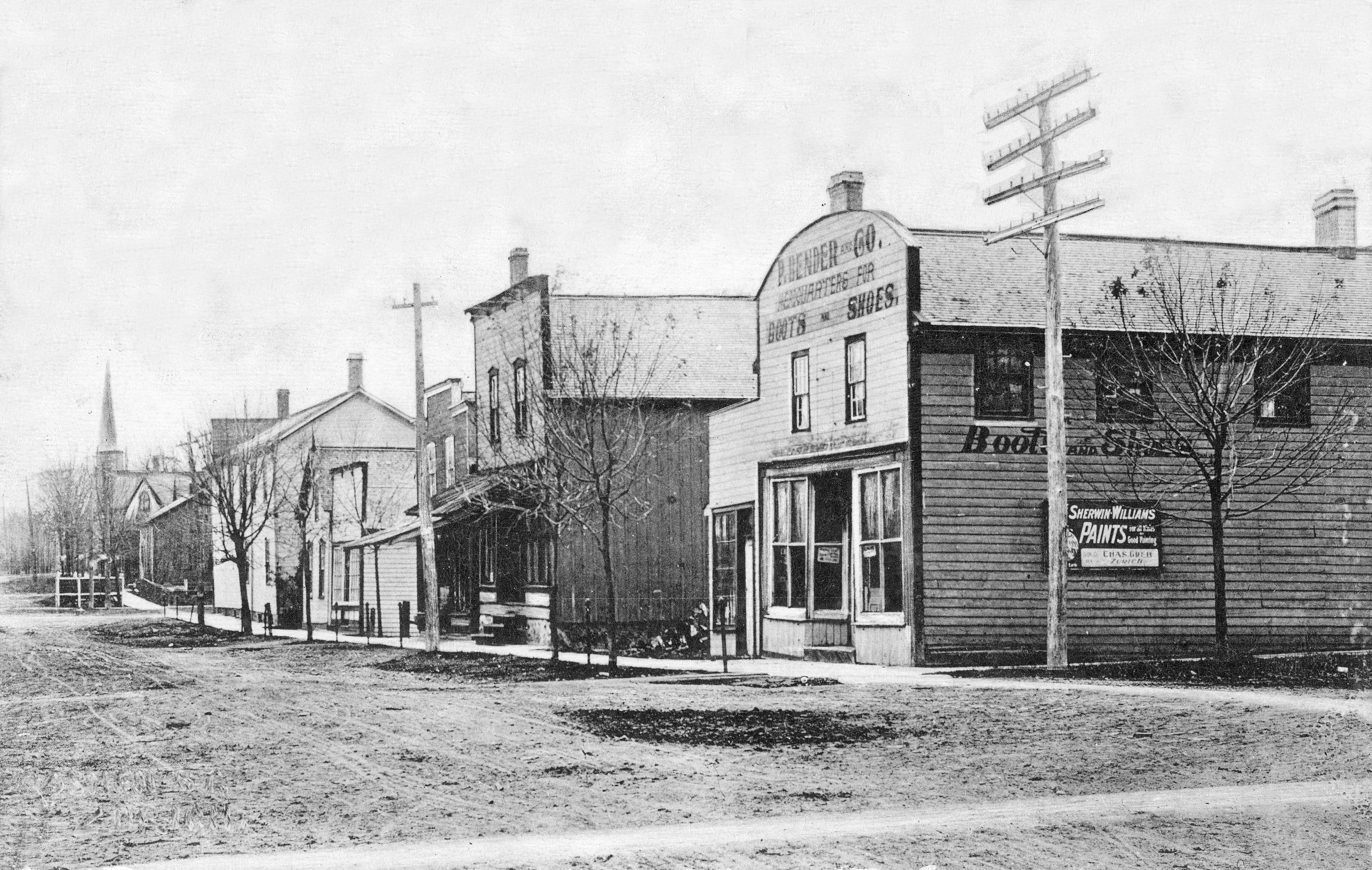
Goshen Street in Zurich, 1910

Zurich is a community in southwestern Ontario, Canada, in the Municipality of Bluewater in Huron County, about six kilometres inland from Lake Huron, on Ontario's west coast. Zurich was founded in 1856 and is known for its Swiss heritage, as is reflected in some of the architecture.

On the fourth weekend in August, Zurich has its annual Bean Festival. The annual Bean Festival in Zurich is the highlight of the year with many local and international vendors attending. It includes many traditional carnival rides. Also, there is a classic and vintage car show spanning the entire festival from Friday to Sunday. Traditionally, a "cruise night" encompasses all of Huron County on Fridays.

== Demographics ==
In the 2021 Census of Population conducted by Statistics Canada, Zurich had a population of 941 living in 399 of its 410 total private dwellings, a change of 2.6% from its 2016 population of 917. With a land area of 0.85 km^{2} (0.33 sq mi), it had a population density of 1,107.1/km^{2} (2,867.3/sq mi) in 2021.

== Notable people ==
- Babe Siebert (1904–1939), member of the Hockey Hall of Fame.
- Paul Steckle, former Member of Parliament for Huron-Bruce.

== See also ==
- List of unincorporated communities in Ontario
