= James Bowman (Canadian politician) =

Canadian politician (1861–1940)

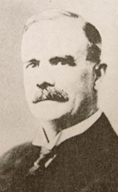
- James Bowman in 1918

Member of the Canadian Parliament for Huron East (1911–1917) Huron North (1917–1921)
- In office 1911–1921
- Preceded by: Thomas Chisholm
- Succeeded by: John Warwick King

Personal details
- Born: October 31, 1861 Morris Township, Canada West
- Died: May 2, 1940 (aged 78)
- Party: Conservative Party (1911–1917); Unionist (1917–)
- Occupation: farmer

James Bowman (October 31, 1861 – May 2, 1940) was a politician and farmer. Born in Morris Township, Canada West, he was later elected to the House of Commons of Canada in 1911 as a member of the Conservative Party to represent the riding of Huron East, succeeding over rival Archibald Hyslop.

Bowman was re-elected in the 1917 election as a Unionist to represent Huron North. Prior to his federal political experience, he was reeve of Morris Township (1897–1898) and councillor (1892–1896) then councillor of Huron County, Ontario (1899–1905).
