= Inverhuron Provincial Park =

Provincial park in Ontario, Canada

- IUCN category II (national park)
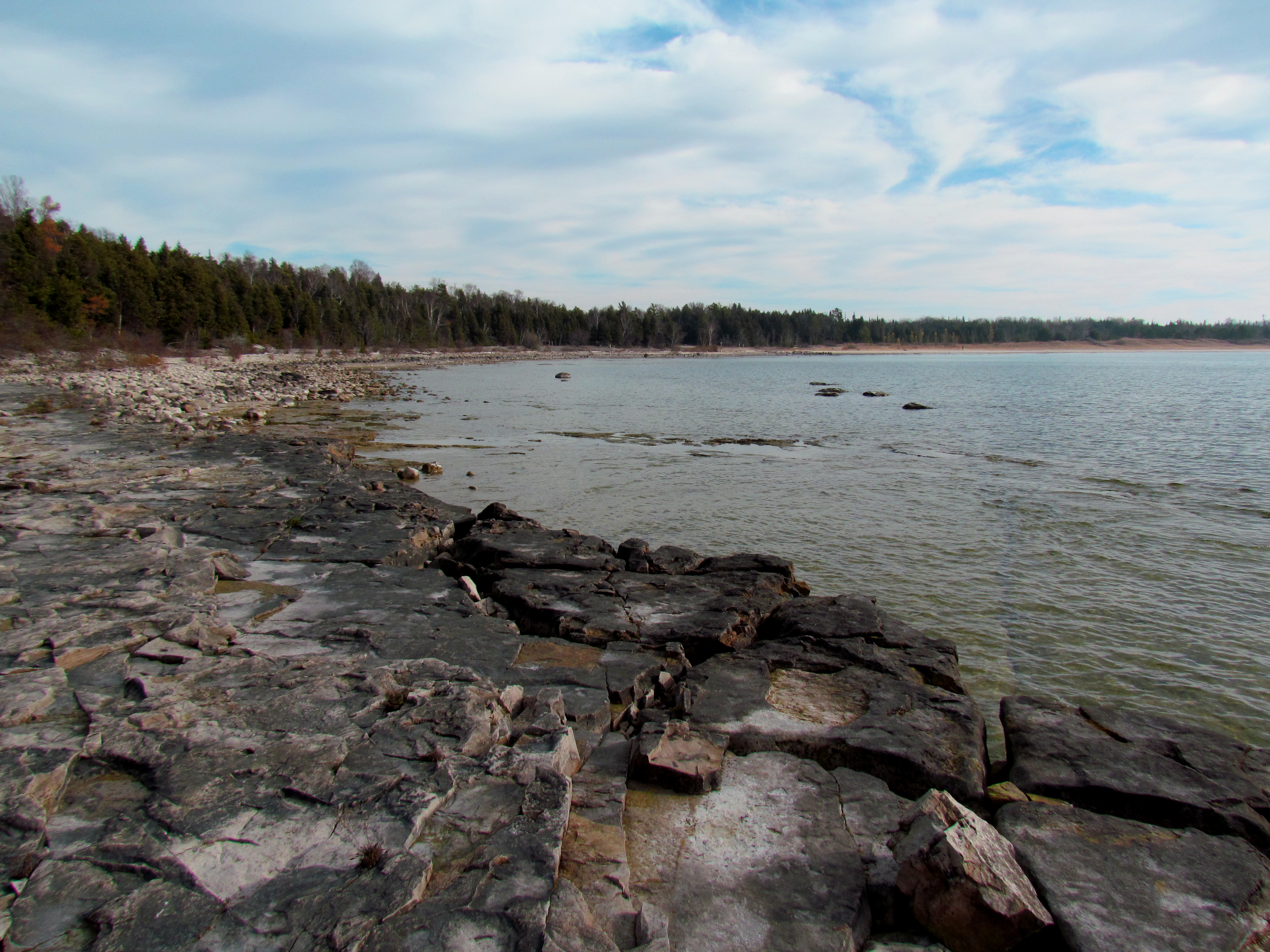
- Shoreline and beach area, Lake Huron

- Location within Bruce County Location within Southern Ontario
- Interactive map of Inverhuron Provincial Park
- Location: Bruce County, Ontario, Canada
- Nearest city: Tiverton
- Coordinates: 44°17′59″N 81°35′17″W
- Area: 288 ha (710 acres)
- Established: 1956
- Visitors: 132,251 (in 2022)
- Governing body: Ontario Parks
- Website: ontarioparks.ca/park/inverhuron

Inverhuron Provincial Park is a provincial park located on the shores of Lake Huron beside the small village of Inverhuron, Ontario, near Tiverton, Ontario, Canada. The park opened in 1956.

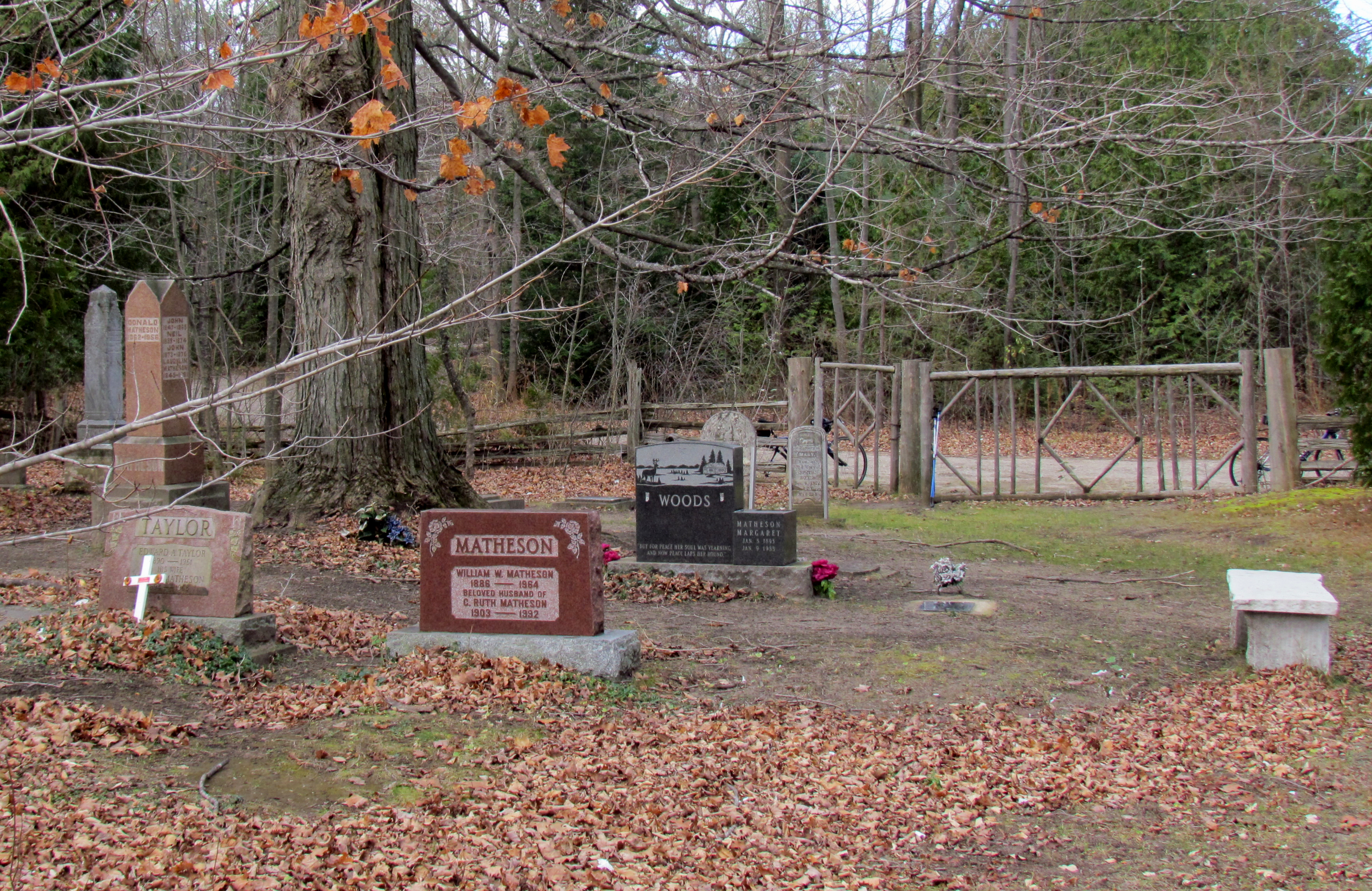
Pioneer cemetery inside park

With the construction of a heavy water "deuterium oxide" plant at the Bruce Nuclear Power Development, Ontario Hydro purchased the park from the Ministry of Natural Resources in 1973 for issues of safety and security.

== See also ==
- List of Ontario Parks
