= George Spotton =

Canadian politician (1877–1936)

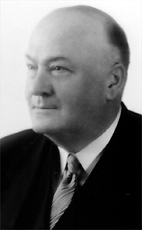
George Spotton

George Spotton (March 23, 1877 – April 20, 1936) was a Canadian Member of Parliament between 1927 and 1935.

Spotton received a bachelor's degree in history from Queen's University, graduating in 1895.

During World War I he briefly served in the Canadian Army (now the Canadian Forces) as a broadcast journalist.

He was born to Margaret Hickson and James Spotton in the township of Howick, Ontario. He died of lung cancer at the age of 59.

== Political career ==
Spotton was elected as a member of parliament for the Huron North, Ontario region, where he ran as a Conservative. He advocated less autonomy for provinces and the implementation of a Canadian cultural program. This program was scrapped at the time, but revived almost a century later by the Liberals. George Spotton is rarely recognized as a pioneer of Canadian cultural issues, mainly because of his unpopular stance on relations with the United States, in which he pushed for stronger ties with their Southern neighbour. In his political views he was also a staunch monarchist, well known for his belief that the only true Canadian men were those with British backgrounds. He also argued fervently against the contemporaneous influx of immigrants from Eastern Europe on the basis that they showed little interest in Canada and Canadian politics.

== Election campaign ==
In his 1927 election campaign George Spotton held the motto "We Will Win" and though he won, garnering 1,915 votes, it was hardly an endorsement of leadership of any level. He polled about 1,891 votes only half of the eligible voters in Horwick county. George Spotton was then accused of corrupt election practise when several voters said they were shaken down by police for money, this was later discovered to be an attempt to mudsling at George Spotton. He was not the only member facing trouble. His brother in-law was charged with criminal corruption, but cleared for the same reasons.

This election campaign turned into a political drama of sorts reminiscent of the novel All the King's Men. With leaders on either side facing off in a bitter election campaign attacking the integrity of everyone involved.

== Business career ==
Spotton Business College

In addition to a political career, George Spotton was also involved in business and business training. Founder of the Spotton Business College, he provided business training for local townspeople. First established in Wingham, Ontario, it grew to twelve franchises in six cities. These colleges operated for thirty-five years. George Spotton also provided free tuition for the children of soldiers serving overseas during World War I.
