= Huron North (federal electoral district) =

Former federal electoral district in Ontario, Canada

Ontario electoral district

Defunct federal electoral district
- Legislature: House of Commons
- District created: 1867, 1914
- District abolished: 1882, 1952
- First contested: 1867
- Last contested: 1949

Huron North was a federal electoral district represented in the House of Commons of Canada from 1867 to 1882, and from 1917 to 1953. It was located in the province of Ontario. It was created by the British North America Act 1867 which divided the County of Huron into two ridings: Huron North and Huron South.

The North Riding consisted of the Townships of Ashfield, Wawanosh, Turnberry, Howick, Morris, Grey, Colborne, Hullett, and the Village of Clinton and McKillop.

In 1872, the County of Huron was divided into three ridings when Huron Centre was created. The townships of Grey, Colborne, Hullett, and the Village of Clinton and McKillop, were transferred from Huron North to the new riding.

The electoral district was abolished in 1882 when it was redistributed between the newly created Huron East and Huron West ridings.

In 1914, Huron North was re-created from Huron East and Huron West when Huron county was again divided into two ridings. The new riding consisted of the townships of Wawanosh East, Wawanosh West, Colborne, Ashfield, Turnberry, Morris, Howick, and Grey, the towns of Goderich and Wingham, and the villages of Blyth, Brussels and Wroxeter.

In 1924, it was redefined to consist of the part of the county of Huron lying north of and including the town of Goderich and the townships of Colborne, Wawanosh (East and West), Morris and Grey.

In 1934, it was redefined to consist of the townships of Goderich, Colborne, Ashfield, Wawanosh (East and West), Morris, Grey, Turnberry and Howick, and the town of Clinton in the county of Huron.

The electoral district was abolished in 1952 when it was redistributed between Huron and Wellington—Huron ridings.

== Members of Parliament ==
This riding elected the following members of the House of Commons of Canada:

Parliament	Years	Member	Party
1st	1867–1872	Joseph Whitehead	Liberal
2nd	1872–1874	Thomas Farrow	Liberal–Conservative
3rd	1874–1878	Thomas Farrow	Liberal–Conservative
4th	1878–1882	Thomas Farrow	Liberal–Conservative
Riding dissolved into Huron East and Huron West
Riding re-created from Huron East and Huron West
13th	1917–1921	James Bowman	Government (Unionist)
14th	1921–1925	John Warwick King	Progressive
15th	1925–1926	John Warwick King	Progressive
16th	1926–1927†	John Warwick King	Progressive
16th	1927–1930	George Spotton	Conservative
17th	1930–1935	George Spotton	Conservative
18th	1935–1940	Robert Deachman	Liberal
19th	1940–1945	Elston Cardiff	National Government
20th	1945–1949	Elston Cardiff	Progressive Conservative
21st	1949–1953	Elston Cardiff	Progressive Conservative
Riding dissolved into Huron and Wellington—Huron

== Election results ==
=== 1867–1882 ===
1867 Canadian federal election
Party	Candidate	Votes
Liberal	Joseph Whitehead	1,940
Conservative	John Holmes	1,318
Unknown	Dr. Sloan	675
Eligible voters		5,173
Source: Canadian Parliamentary Guide, 1871

1872 Canadian federal election
Party	Candidate	Votes
Liberal–Conservative	Thomas Farrow	1,550
Liberal	James Somerville	1,359

1874 Canadian federal election
Party	Candidate	Votes
Liberal–Conservative	Thomas Farrow	1,655
Unknown	? Leckie	1,510

1878 Canadian federal election
Party	Candidate	Votes
Liberal–Conservative	Thomas Farrow	1,933
Unknown	? Sloan	1,849

=== 1917–1953 ===
1917 Canadian federal election
Party	Candidate	Votes
Government (Unionist)	James Bowman	4,799
Opposition (Laurier Liberals)	Archibald Hislop	2,770

1921 Canadian federal election
Party	Candidate	Votes
Progressive	John Warwick King	5,243
Conservative	George Spotton	4,057
Liberal	William Henry Frasier	2,426

1925 Canadian federal election
Party	Candidate	Votes
Progressive	John Warwick King	5,340
Conservative	George Spotton	5,170

1926 Canadian federal election
Party	Candidate	Votes
Progressive	John Warwick King	5,892
Conservative	Hugh John Alexander MacEwan	5,547

On Mr. King's death, 14 January 1927:

By-election on 12 September 1927
Party	Candidate	Votes
Conservative	George Spotton	4,595
Liberal	Archibald Hislop	4,407
Progressive	Sheldon Bricker	2,673

1930 Canadian federal election
Party	Candidate	Votes
Conservative	George Spotton	6,160
Liberal	William Henry Robertson	5,927

1935 Canadian federal election
Party	Candidate	Votes
Liberal	Robert John Deachman	6,508
Conservative	George Spotton	5,925
Reconstruction	William James Henderson	1,572

1940 Canadian federal election
Party	Candidate	Votes
National Government	Elston Cardiff	5,937
Liberal	Robert John Deachman	5,897

1945 Canadian federal election
Party	Candidate	Votes
Progressive Conservative	Elston Cardiff	7,083
Liberal	Douglas Ross Nairn	5,273
Co-operative Commonwealth	Morley Francis Mills	586

1949 Canadian federal election
Party	Candidate	Votes
Progressive Conservative	Elston Cardiff	6,986
Liberal	Robert Scott Hetherington	6,465
Co-operative Commonwealth	Harry Charles Burrows	497

== See also ==
- List of Canadian electoral districts
- Historical federal electoral districts of Canada
