= Peter Macdonald (Canadian politician) =

Canadian politician

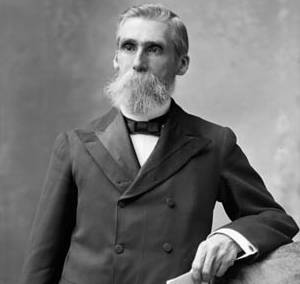
Peter Macdonald Source: Library and Archives Canada

Peter Macdonald (August 14, 1835 – March 24, 1923) was a physician and political figure in Ontario, Canada. He represented Huron East in the House of Commons of Canada from 1887 to 1904 as a Liberal member.

He was born in Pictou County, Nova Scotia, the son of Scottish immigrants, James and Margaret Macdonald. The family came to Huron County, Canada West in 1846, and MacDonald later went to Toronto in pursuit of an education in medicine. While there, he met Margaret Ross, and the two were married in 1865. He graduated from Trinity College with a degree medical in 1872 and set up practice in Wingham. Macdonald served as a member of the town council for Wingham; he was reeve in 1879 and mayor in 1881. He also served as chairman of the school board and coroner for Huron County. Macdonald was deputy speaker and chairman of Committees of the Whole from 1901 to 1904. He ran unsuccessfully for reelection to the House of Commons in 1904.

Macdonald's daughter Annie Caroline went to Japan in 1904 as a representative of the YWCA and later became involved in prison reform there.
