= Stratford Transit =

Bus service facility provider in Ontario, Canada

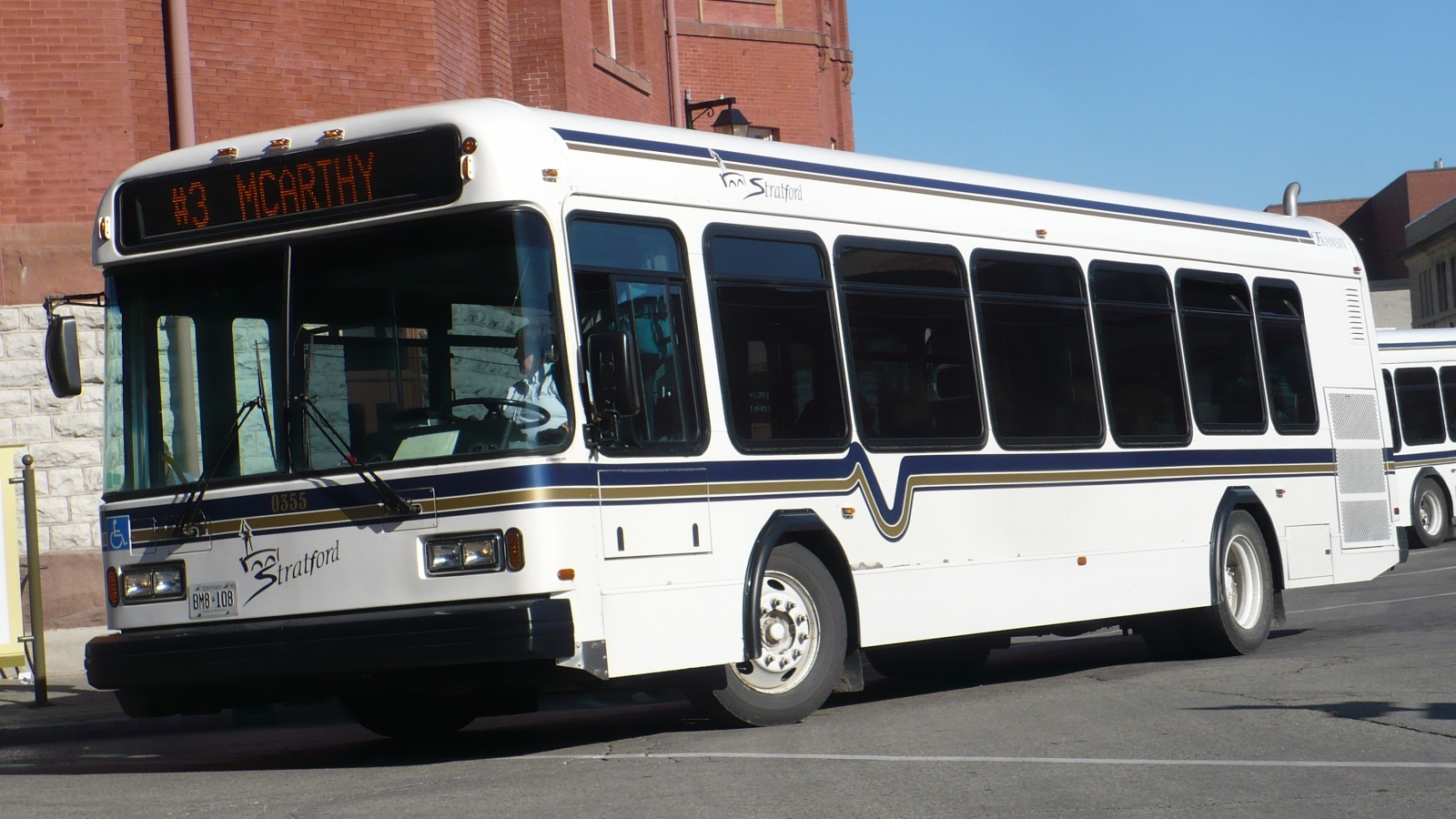
- Founded: 1952
- Locale: Stratford, Ontario
- Service area: Urban area
- Service type: Bus service
- Routes: 7
- Hubs: 1
- Fleet: 14
- Operator: City of Stratford
- Website: City of Stratford Transit

Stratford Transit provides the local bus service in Stratford, a city in Southwestern Ontario, Canada. The system is owned and operated by the city as part of the Community Services Department.

== Services ==
Seven bus routes operate on loops throughout the community on a 30-minute schedule that converge at the Cooper bus terminal on Downie St. Service runs on Monday to Friday from 6:00 am to 9:30 pm. Weekend bus service runs on an on-demand booking system, where a rider can request a bus through a mobile app, online portal, or by calling.

=== Regular routes ===
No.	Name	Service area
1	Huron	Huron Street, Stratford Coliseum, Agricultural Grounds, Stratford Northwestern Secondary School, St. Michael Catholic Secondary School and the northwest area.
2	East End	Railway station, Festival Marketplace Mall and the east end of the city, along Highway 8
3	McCarthy	Kiwanis Community Centre and the area of the city north of Lake Victoria
4	Queensland	Central Secondary School, Stratford General Hospital and the southwest area, south of the Avon River
5	Devon	Art Gallery, Festival Theatre, Queen's Park and the area north of Ontario Street
6	Downie	Downie Street and the southeast area
7	Industrial	Lorne East Business Park, and southern area

=== Paratransit ===
Parallel Transit is the name of the city service that provides door-to-door accessible transportation only for individuals who are disabled. Registration and pre-approval is needed and 48-hour advance booking is required.

== See also ==
- Public transport in Canada
