= Clinton, Ontario =

Clinton
- Unincorporated community
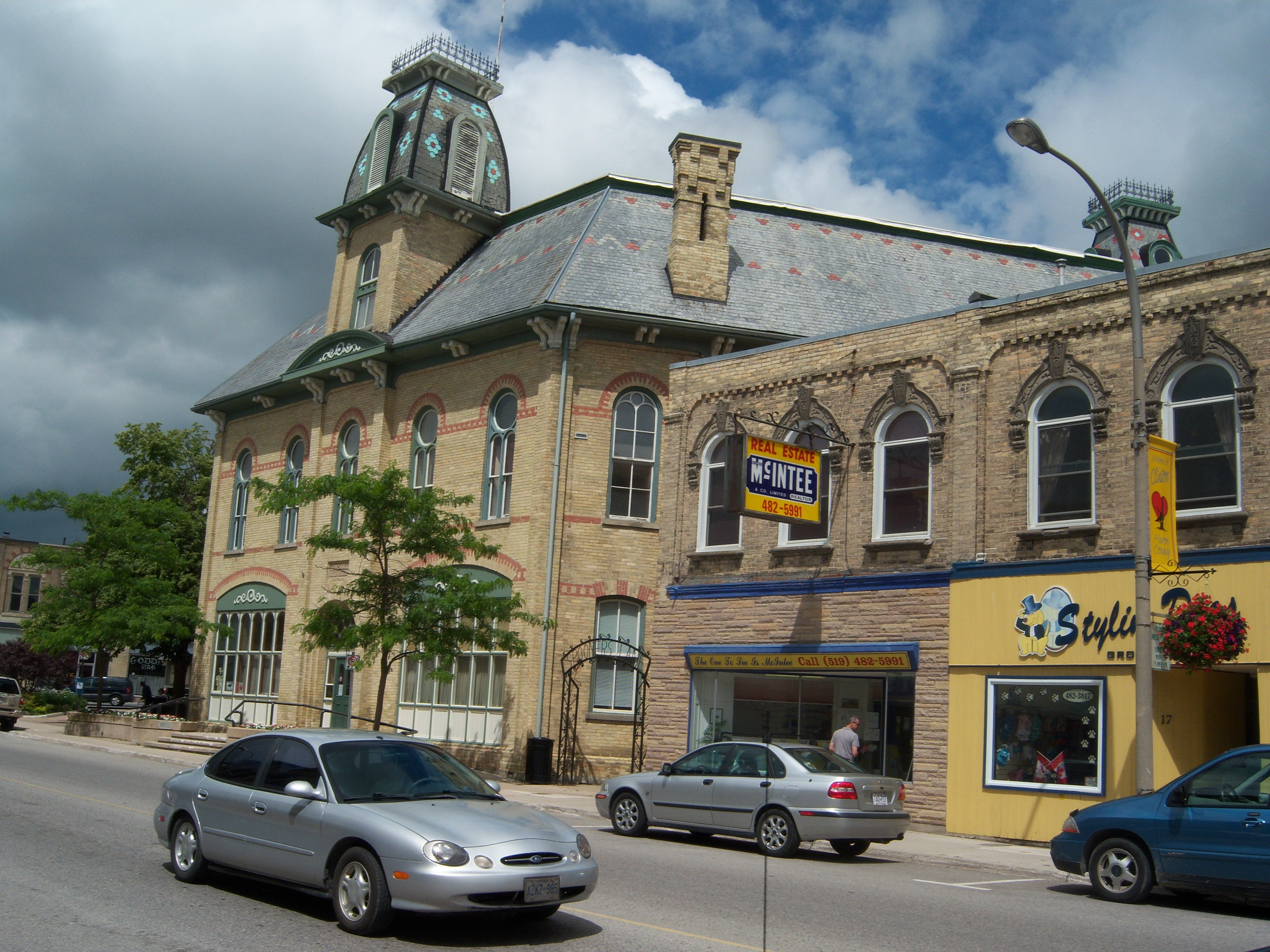

- Location within Ontario
- Coordinates: 43°36′57″N 81°32′22″W
- Country: Canada
- Province: Ontario
- County: Huron
- Municipality: Central Huron

Clinton is a community in the Canadian province of Ontario, located in the municipality of Central Huron. Clinton was established in 1831, when Jonas Gibbings and brothers Peter and Stephen Vanderburg cleared out a small area to start. Clinton started to grow in 1844 when William Rattenbury laid out the plans to begin making a village. In 1954, Clinton's population was 2,625 people. Today, it has an estimated population of 3,203.

Clinton is known as Canada's home of radar and there is a large radar antenna in the downtown because of its association with RCAF Station Clinton during World War II. Clinton was known as "The Corners" or "Rattenbury Corner" in its earlier days.

== History ==
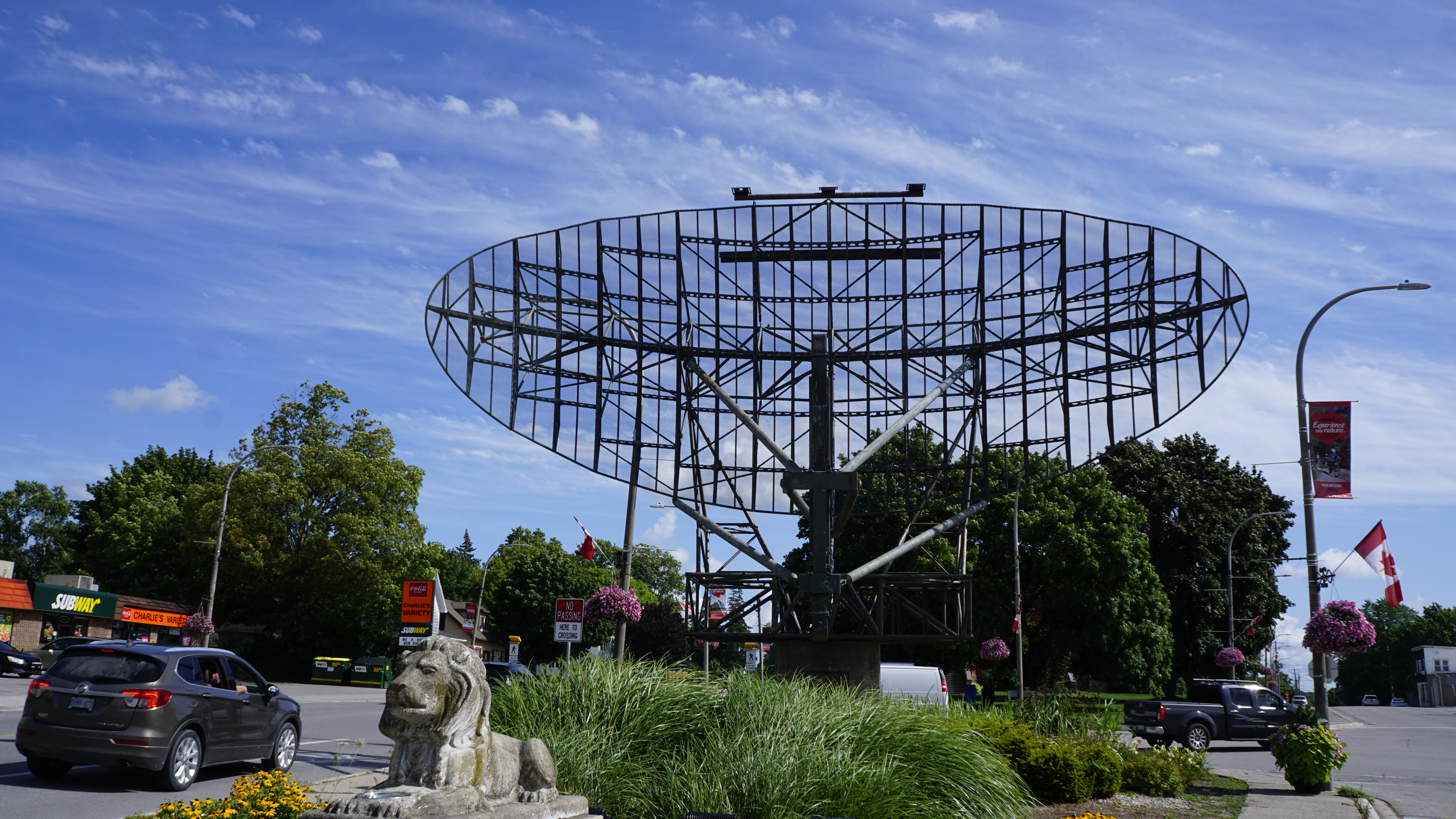
Radar Monument

Clinton was established in 1831, when Jonas Gibbings and brothers Peter and Stephen Vanderburg cleared out a small area to start. It was named after Sir Henry Clinton, who distinguished himself during the Peninsular War. Clinton started to grow in 1844 when William Rattenbury laid out the plans to begin making a village. Soon after, people began buying land from Rattenbury as well as the Gibbings.

Clinton was the home of the highly influential 19th-century ethnologist and anthropologist Horatio Hale, who involved himself locally in real estate development and other business and educational endeavours. Several of the streets in the centre of the town were personally named by him. Hale is interred in the municipal cemetery north of the community.

In 1858, the Buffalo and Lake Huron Railway set up a stop in Clinton. The station was dismantled and moved to 196 Dunlop Street as a private residence.

In 1863, the first fire department was set up, with 40 men volunteering for duty.

In 1868, William Doherty established the W. Doherty Piano and Organ Co, which manufactured a substantial number of pianos and reed organs in Clinton until the 1930s. Doherty operated a storefront on the main street until 1875, when the company opened a large factory in the town. The factory burned down in 1898 and was quickly rebuilt in time to manufacture organs for the year's CNE.

The population in 1869 was 1,500.

In 1875, Clinton was incorporated as a town.

In 1879, Clinton's original town hall burned, destroying the town's library and other municipal facilities.

In 1907, a fire burned a substantial business section of the town - with the town's first hotel going up in flames, along with a threshing company, a barn and 20 houses.

In 1959, the Clinton area was shocked by the murder of 12-year-old Lynne Harper. Her remains were discovered in a local woodlot near RCAF Station Clinton on June 11, 1959. A local youth, Stephen Truscott (aged 14 years at the time), was falsely convicted of the crime and sentenced to be executed. After a 48-year struggle to clear his name, Truscott was finally acquitted by the Ontario Court of Appeal on August 28, 2007.

In 1978, a protest by church members demanded that three titles be censored from high-school reading lists: Margaret Laurence's The Diviners, J. D. Salinger's The Catcher in the Rye, and John Steinbeck's Of Mice and Men. A meeting with the Huron County Board of Education, based in Clinton, was attended by prominent Canadian writers including the local resident Alice Munro along with local church members. The school board voted to ban The Diviners from the five high schools within its jurisdiction because of sexual references and objectionable language. This event prompted the Book and Periodical Council of Canada to form a Freedom of Expression Committee later that year and was the driving factor behind a library-driven Freedom to Read week, which continues to occur across Ontario libraries.

== Demographics ==
Demographics
	0-14	15-64	65+	Total	% of population
Male	260	880	315	1,450	
Female	255	940	400	1,595	
Total	515	1,820	715	3,045	100
Source: Stats Canada 2016

== Transportation ==
Clinton is at the junction of Highway 4 (Victoria Street), Highway 8 (Huron Street and Ontario Street) and County Road 4 (Albert Street).

== Education ==
Public education in Clinton is managed by the Avon Maitland District School Board, who oversee Central Huron Secondary School and Clinton Public School (elementary). Catholic education is the responsibility of the Huron-Perth Catholic District School Board, who manage St. Anne's Catholic Secondary School and St. Joseph's Catholic School (elementary). Due to Clinton's central location in the county, most students are bused into the schools from surrounding areas. Huron Christian School is a private school offering Christian education for students from kindergarten to grade eight.

The School On Wheels, a school car that visited remote Northern Ontario communities to educate children who would otherwise not have access to school, is permanently on display in Clinton as a museum about education.

== Media ==
The local paper of Clinton is the Clinton News-Record located at 53 Albert Street. Founded by Cheryl Heath in 1865 the News-Record is currently owned by Postmedia.

The local radio stations include 104.9 The Beach as well as:

- CKNX-FM 101.7 "The One" - local, regional and national news and adult contemporary music
- CIBU-FM 94.5/91.7 "Classic Rock" - local, regional and national news and classic rock music

== Notable people ==
- Sybil Courtice (1884–1980), missionary teacher in Japan from 1910 to 1942
- Gregory Gallant, pen name Seth, (born 1962) comic book artist and writer
- Tim Grant, commanded Canadian forces in Afghanistan.
- Horatio Hale (1817–1896) influential early ethnologist and anthropologist
- James Mellon Menzies (1885–1957), missionary and archaeologist
- John Muirhead (1877–1954) politician Manitoba, Canada
- William Mustard (1914–1987) cardiac surgeon
- Alice Munro (1931-2024) Nobel Prize winning author
- Ryan O'Reilly (born 1991), Canadian ice hockey player and Stanley Cup champion
- William Dillon Otter, first Canadian-born Commander of the Canadian Army.
- Joseph Whitehead (1814–1894) Canadian railway pioneer and political figure, former mayor of Clinton, area's first MP.
