= Goderich District Collegiate Institute =

Location
- 260 South Street; Goderich, Ontario, N7A 3M5; Canada
- Coordinates: 43.7346°N 81.7120°W

Information
- School type: High School
- Motto: Palman non sine pulvere (no palm without dust)
- Founded: 1841; 185 years ago
- School board: Avon Maitland District School Board
- Superintendent: Helena Finch
- Principal: Lucy Langis
- Grades: 7 to 12
- Language: English
- Area: Goderich Vicinity
- Colours: Blue & White
- Mascot: A Viking
- Team name: Vikings
- Website: gdcivikings.ca

Goderich District Collegiate Institute (G.D.C.I.) is the only high school in the town of Goderich, Ontario. It is home to the Goderich Vikings.

== School history ==
G.D.C.I. was established as a Grammar School in 1841, and was privately run for over 30 years. In 1874, the local School Board purchased a site at the corners of Picton Street, Wellington Street, and Elgin Avenue in Goderich, and opened the new G.D.C.I. in 1875. Its enrollment grew to 200 students within six years. At its peak, it has had enrollment of up to 1000 students. G.D.C.I. is now home to 536 students from around Goderich and area.

This building was expanded three times and eventually replaced in 1951 with the building on South Street that students attend today. There have been several additions, such as the West Gym which was added in 1965, along with the Technical wing and the library. The latest renovations include the science labs and geography rooms which were added in 1990, as well as a complete redesign to expand the library. The front foyer and main office had extensive renovations in 2005 to enlarge the student services area incorporate the main office into what was the board room and a portion of the front foyer.

In 2010, the school began to house grades 7 and 8. This followed the merging of Victoria Public School and Robertson Public School into one, Goderich Public School, during the 2009–2010 school year.

== The arts ==
=== Drama ===
Since 2002, the Drama club has won 71 awards, which includes awards to the company, and individual actors, musicians, directors.

=== Music ===
G.D.C.I. has numerous bands, including Jazz and Concert.

== Notable alumni ==
- Matthew Robert Blake (1876–1937) – Canadian politician and soldier

== See also ==
- Education in Ontario
- List of secondary schools in Ontario
- CHSS, an affiliated public school in Clinton, ON.
- St. Anne's Catholic Secondary School, the associated Catholic school in Clinton, ON.
