= GDCI =

GDCI may refer to:

- Goderich District Collegiate Institute
- Gasoline Direct Injection Compression Ignition, also known as Partially premixed combustion
- Google Doodle Champion Island Games
