= Stratford Central Secondary School =

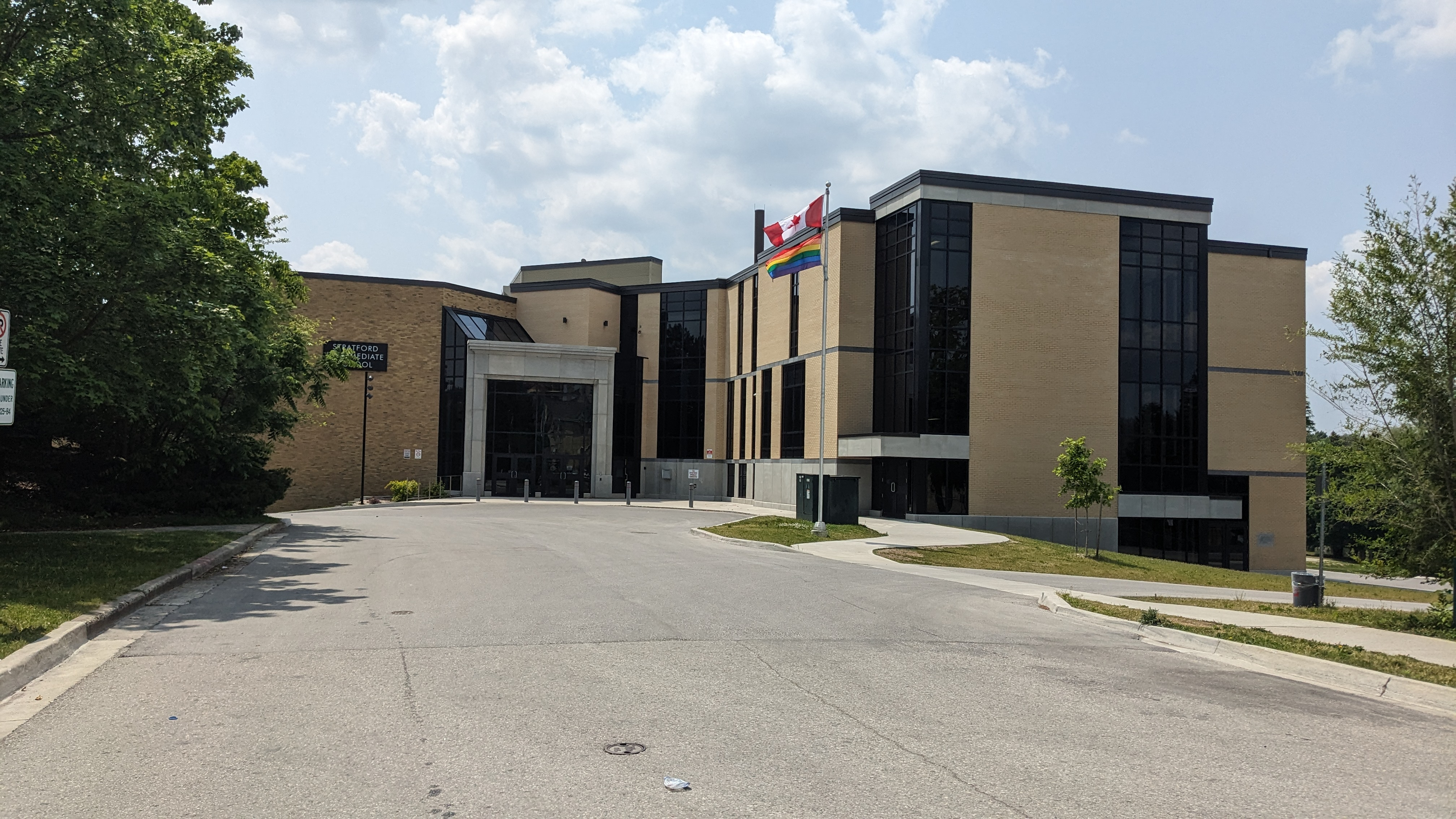
- Street view of school

Location
- 60 St. Andrew Street; Stratford, Ontario; Canada
- Coordinates: 43.371030°N 80.987185°W

Information
- Other names: Central
- Former name: Stratford Collegiate Vocational Institute
- School type: Secondary, Middle School
- Founded: 1844; 182 years ago
- Status: Permanently Closed
- Closed: 2019
- School board: Avon Maitland District School Board
- Grades: 7-12
- Language: English and French
- Colours: Red/burgundy, green, and white
- Mascot: Gunther the Ram
- Team name: Central Rams
- Website: scss.amdsb.ca

Stratford Central Secondary School was a public high school and middle school in Stratford, Ontario, Canada.

The school was originally called Stratford Collegiate Institute.

In 2020, the building was renamed Stratford Intermediate School, and became a school for Grades 7 and 8. Secondary students from the former school were moved to Stratford Northwestern Secondary School, which was renamed Stratford District Secondary School.

== Extracurricular Activities ==
=== Clubs ===
Stratford Central at closing had 18 different clubs, associations, and councils.

=== Music Ensembles ===
Stratford Central had numerous music ensembles, including:

- Symphonic Band (Grade 10–12)
- Concert Band (Grade 9)
- Jazz Band (Grade 11–12)
- Central singers (School choir)
- Guitar Ensemble
- Rams Horns (Brass Quintet)
- Marching Band

== Notable alumni ==
- Princess Basmah Bani Ahmad, royal princess of Jordan
- Graham Abbey, actor
- James Reaney, poet and playwright
- Stanley Stewart, writer
- Lloyd Robertson, news anchor
- Stewart Reynolds, web personality
- Britta Johnson, composer and lyricist

== See also ==
- Education in Ontario
- List of secondary schools in Ontario
