= Jeanne Sauvé Catholic School =

Coordinates: 43.36876°N 80.97952°W

Location
- 8 Grange Street; Stratford, Ontario, N5A 3P6; Canada

Information
- Other names: Jeanne Sauvé, JS
- Motto: Together on the Journey: Encounter, Accompany, Transform, Go Forth
- Religious affiliation: Roman Catholic
- Established: September 1993; 32 years ago
- School board: Huron-Perth Catholic District School Board
- Principal: Sharon Stephens
- Grades: K-8
- Enrollment: 250
- Colours: Red and blue
- Website: Official website

Jeanne Sauvé Catholic School is a French-language immersion elementary school in Stratford, Ontario Canada. It is part of the Huron-Perth Catholic District School Board. It has been called "truly outstanding" by David Johnson, Professor of Economics at Wilfrid Laurier University in his 2005 study "Ontario's Best Public Schools: An Update to Signposts of Success". The school is named after Jeanne Sauvé, Canada's first woman to serve as both Governor General and Speaker of the House.

== History ==
The building was first home to St. Michael Catholic Secondary School and functioned as a high school from September 1986 to September 1993. The building was renamed and became an elementary school that year, graduating its first cohort in the summer of 1994. Since it was a high school, the school had a larger gym than typical for an elementary school. Due to increased enrolment, the gym was reduced and the performance stage was converted into a classroom in July 2014.

== Notable alumni ==
- Alonzo Holt
- Justin Bieber Attended from first grade through third grade.
