= Avon Maitland District School Board =

Public schools in Ontario, Canada

Avon Maitland District School Board AMDSB

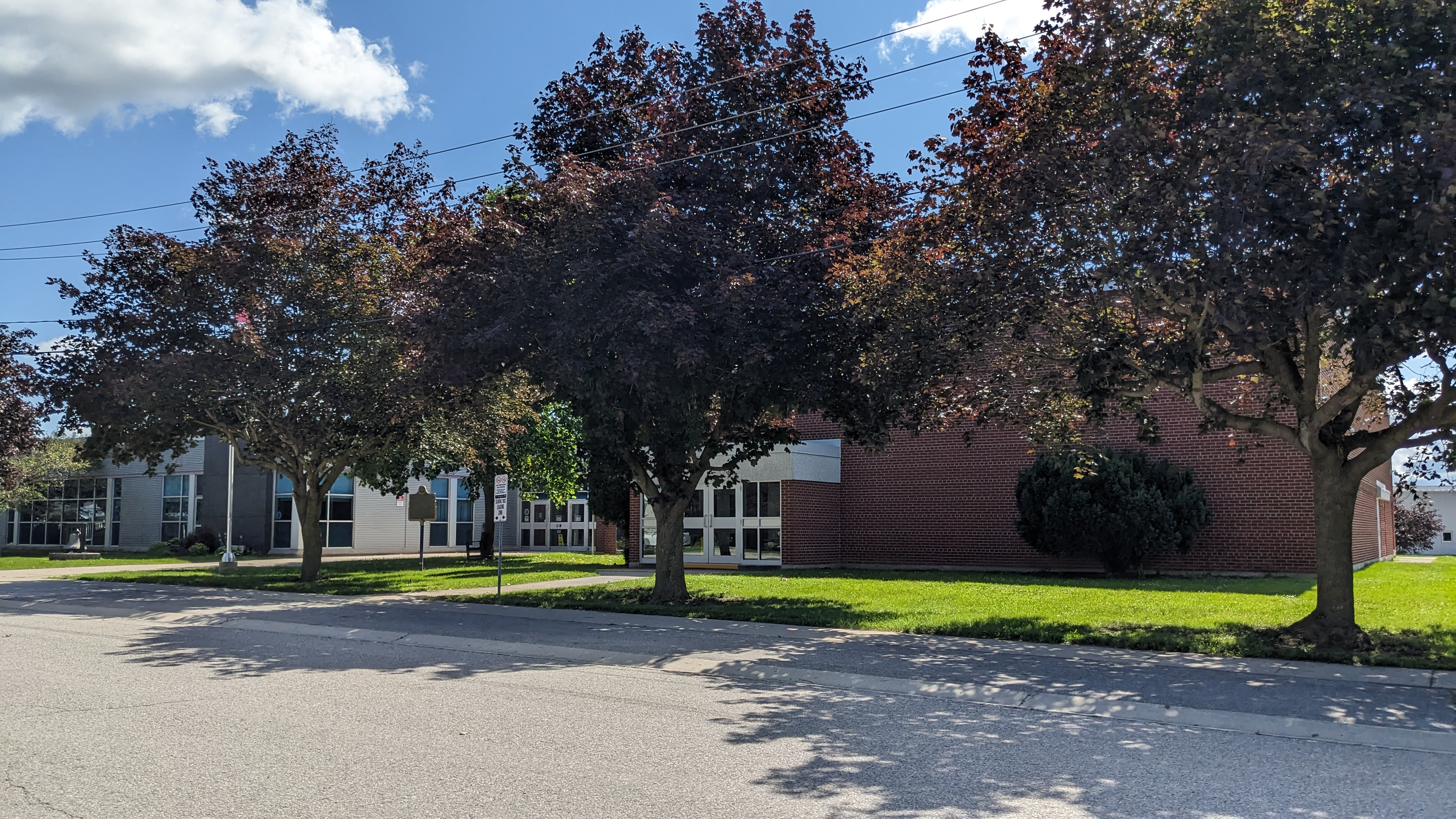
- Administrative building

Location
- 62 Chalk St.N, Seaforth, Ontario All of Huron and Perth Counties Canada
- Coordinates: 43°33′17″N 81°23′19″W

District information
- Chair of the board: Nancy Rothwell
- Director of education: Dr. Graham Shantz
- Schools: 39
- Budget: CA$ 256.15 million ([2022-23])

Other information
- Elected trustees: N. Rothwell, M. Bannerman, S. Armstrong-Marshall, D. Briant, J. Cohen, R. Hunking, D. Logue, P. Smith, B. Whitaker
- Website: www.amdsb.ca

The Avon Maitland District School Board (known as English-language Public District School Board No. 8 prior to 1999) administers public school education in Huron and Perth Counties, including the city of Stratford, in southern Ontario.

Secondary school enrollment and Fraser Institute provincial rankings are as follows:

AMDSB secondary schools
Name	Location
Central Huron Secondary School	Clinton
F.E. Madill Secondary School	Wingham
Goderich District Collegiate Institute	Goderich
Listowel District Secondary School	Listowel
Mitchell District High School	Mitchell
South Huron District High School	Exeter
St. Marys District Collegiate & Vocational Institute	St. Marys
Stratford District Secondary School	Stratford

Roman Catholic education in the area is administered by the Huron Perth Catholic District School Board.

== See also ==
- List of school districts in Ontario
- List of high schools in Ontario
