= Sybil Courtice =

Canadian missionary

- Born: Sybil Ruthena Courtice; May 2, 1884; Goderich Township, Ontario, Canada
- Died: February 16, 1980 (aged 95); Ontario, Canada
- Occupation: Missionary

Sybil Ruthena Courtice (May 2, 1884 – February 16, 1980) was a Canadian missionary and music educator in Japan from 1910 to 1942. She was elected president of the Canadian Association of Tokyo and Yokohama in 1935.

== Early life and education ==
Courtice was born in Potter's Hill, Ontario Goderich Township May 2, 1884 and raised in Clinton, Ontario, the daughter of Edmund Courtice and Mary Trevina Wade (Minnie) Courtice. Her father ran a grocery store. She attended Clinton Collegiate Institute and Victoria College, and graduated from The Royal Conservatory of Music in London, Ontario. In 1908 she entered the National Methodist Training School in Toronto and graduated from the 2 year program in 1910. It was the required program to be appointed as a Methodist missionary by the Woman's Missionary Society at the time.

== Career ==
Courtice gave piano recitals, taught music and was a church organist as a young woman. She was a missionary in Japan beginning in 1910, under the auspices of the Canadian Methodist Woman's Missionary Society, and after 1926 under appointment by the Woman's Missionary Society of The United Church of Canada. She taught at the Toyo Eiwa Jogakko in the Azabu section of Tokyo, and was the school's music director and principal. She also taught at Shizuoka Eiwa Girls' School. She had a prolonged furlough in Canada from 1913 to 1917, because of illness. She was in Canada again on furlough in 1932 and from 1939 to 1940. She was a contributor to the Japan Christian Quarterly.

As war loomed in the 1930s, she wrote that "we do not love war, but we do love the Japanese people." She was secretary-treasurer of the Women's Missionary Society in Japan in the late 1930s. In 1935, she was elected president of the Canadian Association of Tokyo and Yokohama. During World War II Courtice was held in an internment camp with other Western women, including about twenty French-Canadian nuns, and was assigned as the camp commandant's interpreter, because his wife and daughter had been her students.

She was repatriated to Canada in 1943. For the rest of the war she worked with Italian and Japanese residents of Montreal, and lectured about her experiences. She returned to Japan in 1946, to help rebuild the Toyo Eiwa Jogakko school. She wrote a report, The United Church Re-enters Japan, and retired in 1949. In retirement in Canada, she lectured about her work and about Japan.

== Publications ==
- The United Church Re-enters Japan (1946)

== Personal life ==
Courtice lived with her sister Hattie in their later years; Hattie died in 1972, and Courtice died in 1980, at the age of 95, at a nursing home in Clinton, Ontario. The United Church of Canada Archives has holdings related to Courtice, including photographs and articles.
