= St. Anne's Catholic Secondary School =

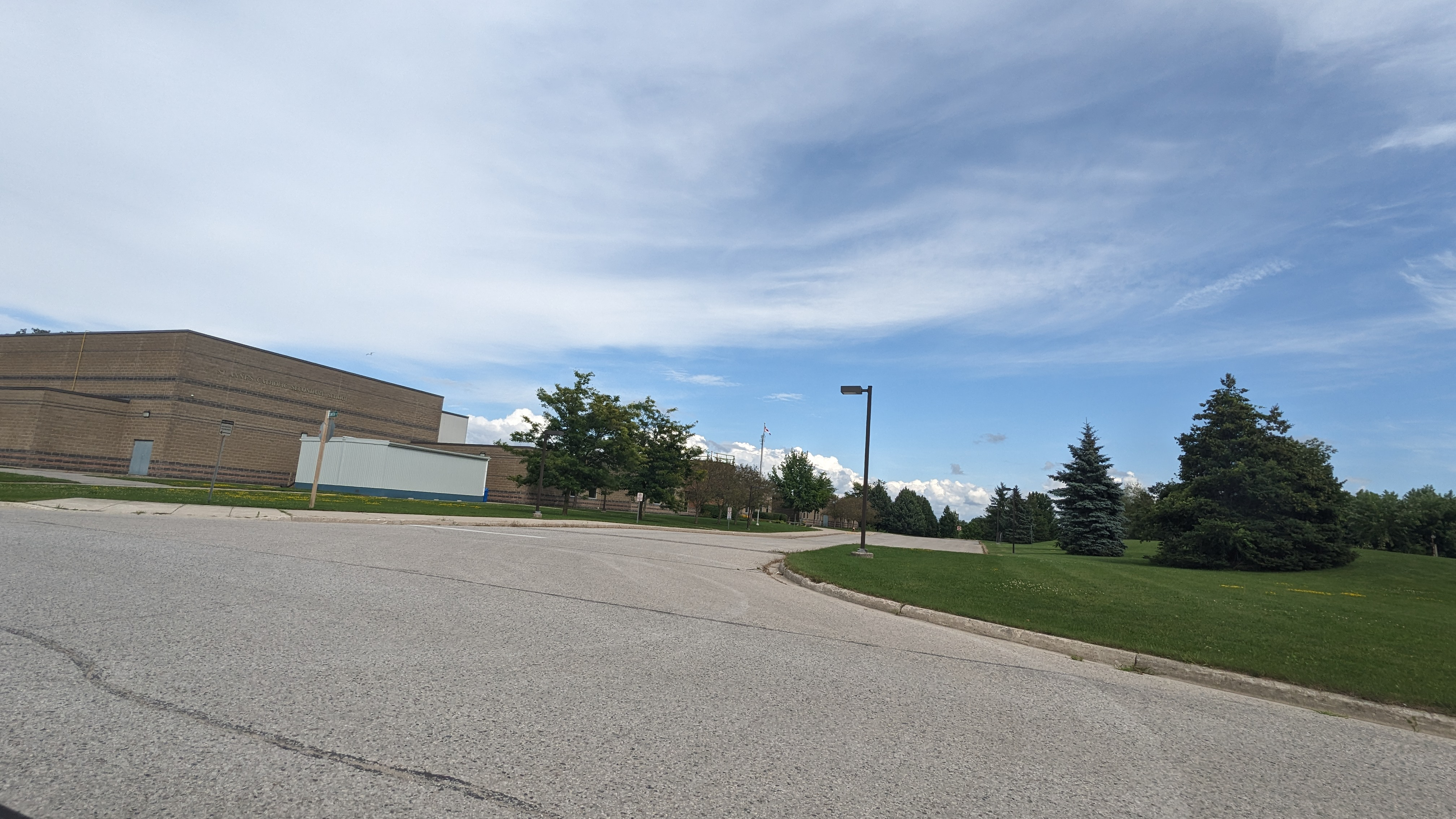
- Exterior of the school

Location
- 353 Ontario St. Clinton, Ontario, N0M 1L0; Canada; 43.61403°N 81.52866°W

Information
- Type: Separate Catholic School
- Motto: In alis aquilae ("On eagle's wings")
- Religious affiliations: St. Peter's Roman Catholic Parish, Goderich
- Established: 1995
- Principal: Chris Grace
- Grades: 9 to 12
- Enrollment: 600 (in 2009)
- Colours: Navy Blue and Burgundy
- Mascot: Eagle, Eagor the Eagle
- Website: http://www.huronperthcatholic.ca/stannes/Pages/default.aspx

St. Anne's Catholic Secondary School (or St. Anne's CSS for short) is a Catholic high school in Clinton, Ontario. It is noted for its sports teams and exceptional grades that are usually at or above the provincial expectations. It serves students from grades nine to twelve. The motto of St. Anne's is "in alis aquilae" which is Latin for "on eagle's wings". This motto is taken from the Book of Isaiah, Chapter 40.

== Origins ==
Construction began in 1995. When the school opened, only 139 students were enrolled, but from a wide catchment across Huron County, including Clinton, Goderich, Bayfield, Wingham and Blyth. The enrolment for the year of 2009 stood at about 600 students. St. Anne's is a rural school and as such, it fills a unique need of catering to those who wish to enter agriculture. St. Anne's is also the only Catholic high school in the county to offer a full French-Immersion high school career.

The school is under the jurisdiction of the Ontario Ministry of Education and is one of two high schools in the Huron-Perth Catholic District School Board (HPCDSB).

== Partner schools ==
St. Anne's is part of a larger family of schools in the area. The elementary schools which act as "feeder schools" are St. Mary's School in Goderich, St. Joseph's Catholic Elementary School in Clinton, St. James School in Seaforth, Precious Blood School in Exeter, Our Lady of Mount Carmel School in Mount Carmel, Sacred Heart School in Wingham, and St. Boniface School in Zurich. St. Michael Catholic Secondary School is the other high school in the school board. It serves Perth County and is in Stratford.

== Faith ==
St. Anne's and the other schools in the board are all Catholic. The families are generally members of the Roman Catholic Church in the Dioceses of London. However, students of all other faiths are allowed in the school but must respect the Catholic aspect (this is why most students are of Christian denominations). All students must take a religion course each school year. To graduate, students need four religion course credits. This course is offered in both French and English.

St. Anne's is part of several parish families within the Diocese of London: St. Peter's Parish, located in three worship sites including Goderich, Clinton and Kingsbridge; St. Boniface Parish, Zurich; Sacred Heart Parish, Wingham; Precious Blood Parish, Exeter; Our Lady of Mount Carmel Parish, Mount Carmel; St. James Parish, Seaforth. The Priest from this parish is the Priest of the school.

== See also ==
- Education in Ontario
- List of secondary schools in Ontario
