= Mitchell District High School =

Secondary school in Ontario, Canada

Coordinates: 43.4755°N 81.1890°W

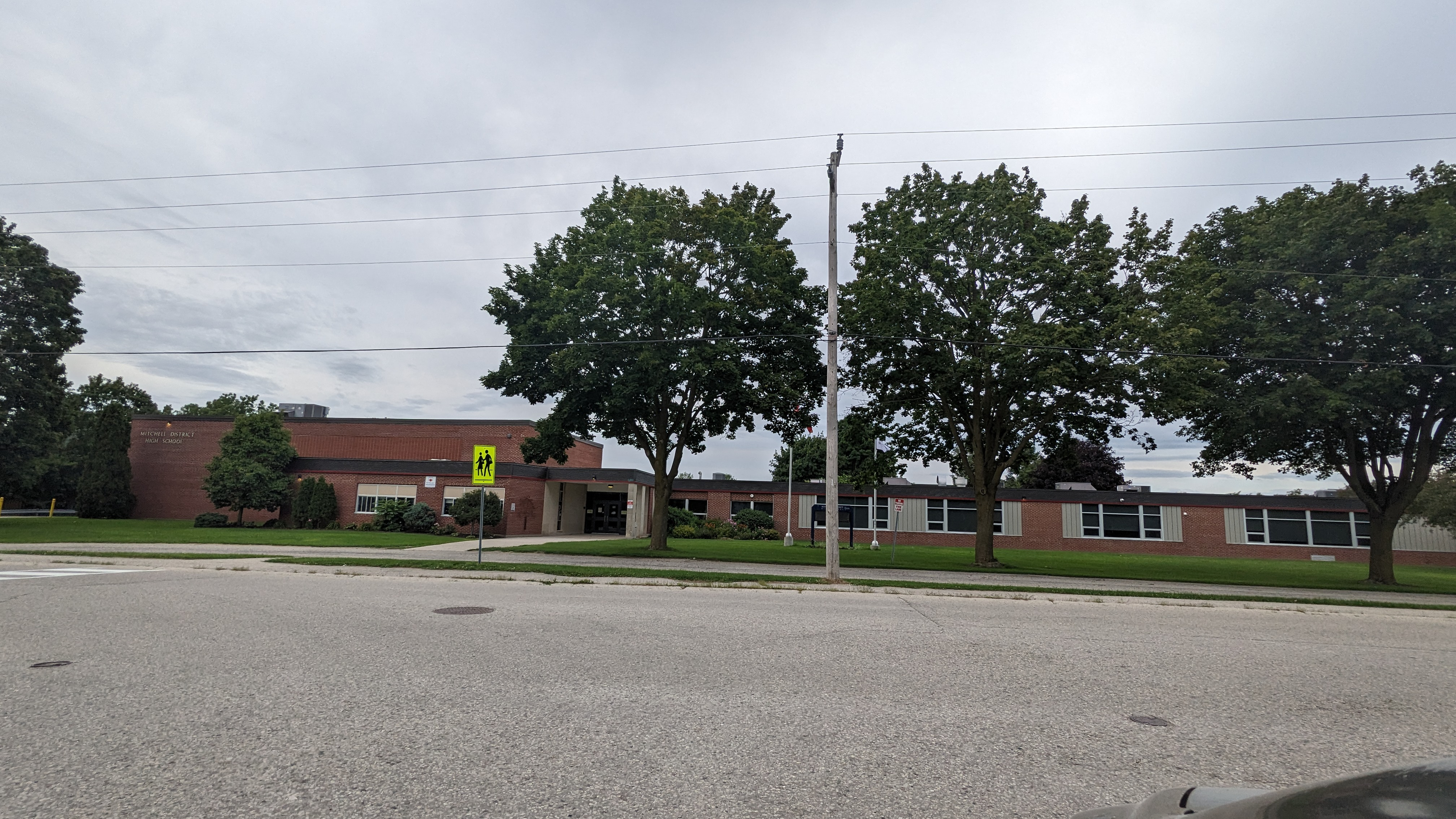

Location
- 95 Frances St RR 5 Mitchell, Ontario N0K1N0; Canada

Information
- Established: 1954; 72 years ago
- School board: Avon Maitland District School Board
- School number: 927120
- Principal: Derek Laidlaw
- Vice-Principal: Sana Zareey
- Grades: 7-12
- Enrollment: 349 (2024)
- Website: mdhs.amdsb.ca

Mitchell District High School is a high school in Mitchell, Ontario, Canada. It opened in 1954, and is operated by the Avon Maitland District School Board. The school had approximately 349 students in the 2024.

== See also ==
- Education in Ontario
- List of secondary schools in Ontario
