= Mitchell, Ontario =

Community in West Perth, Ontario, Canada

Mitchell
- Village
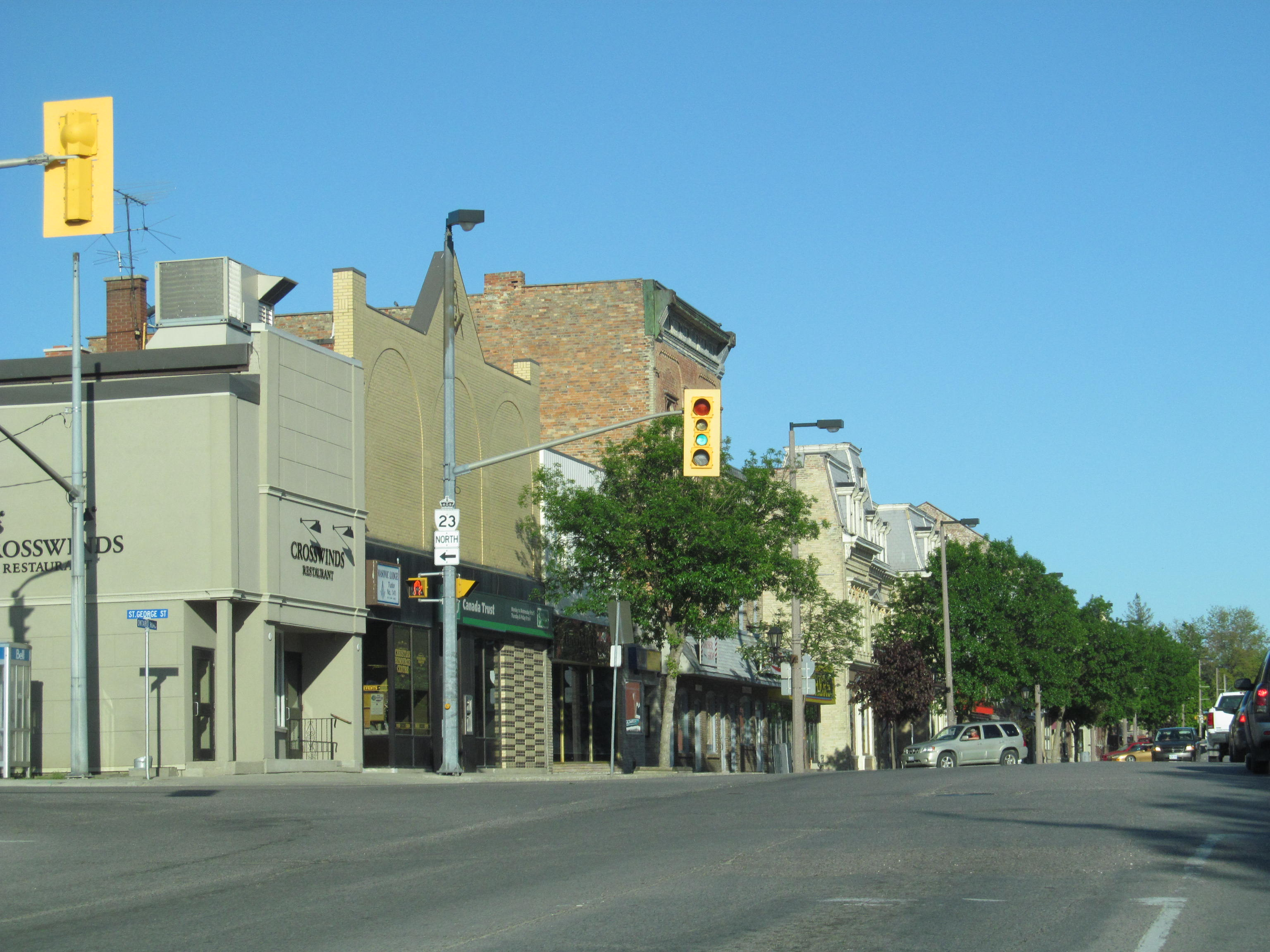
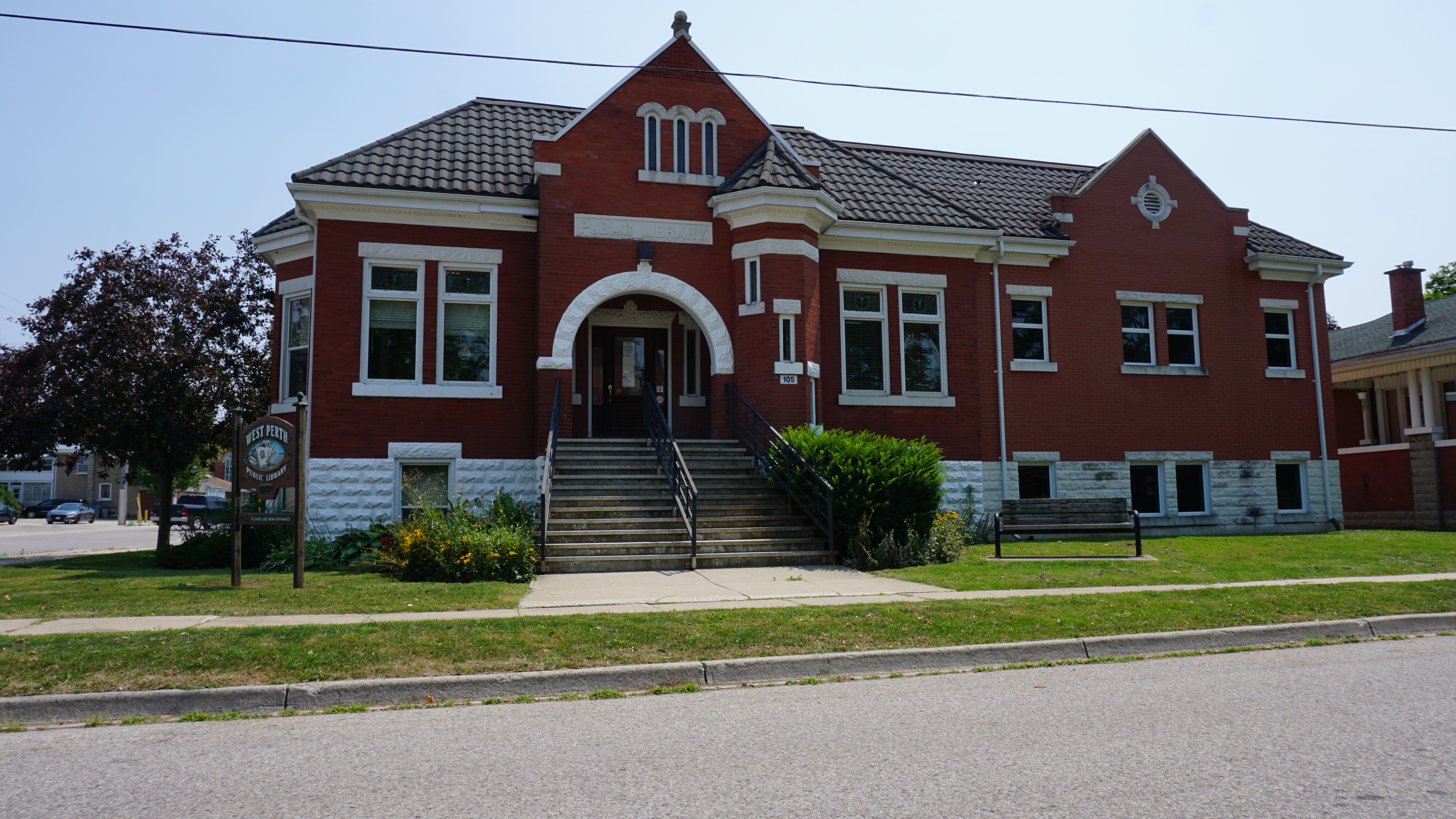
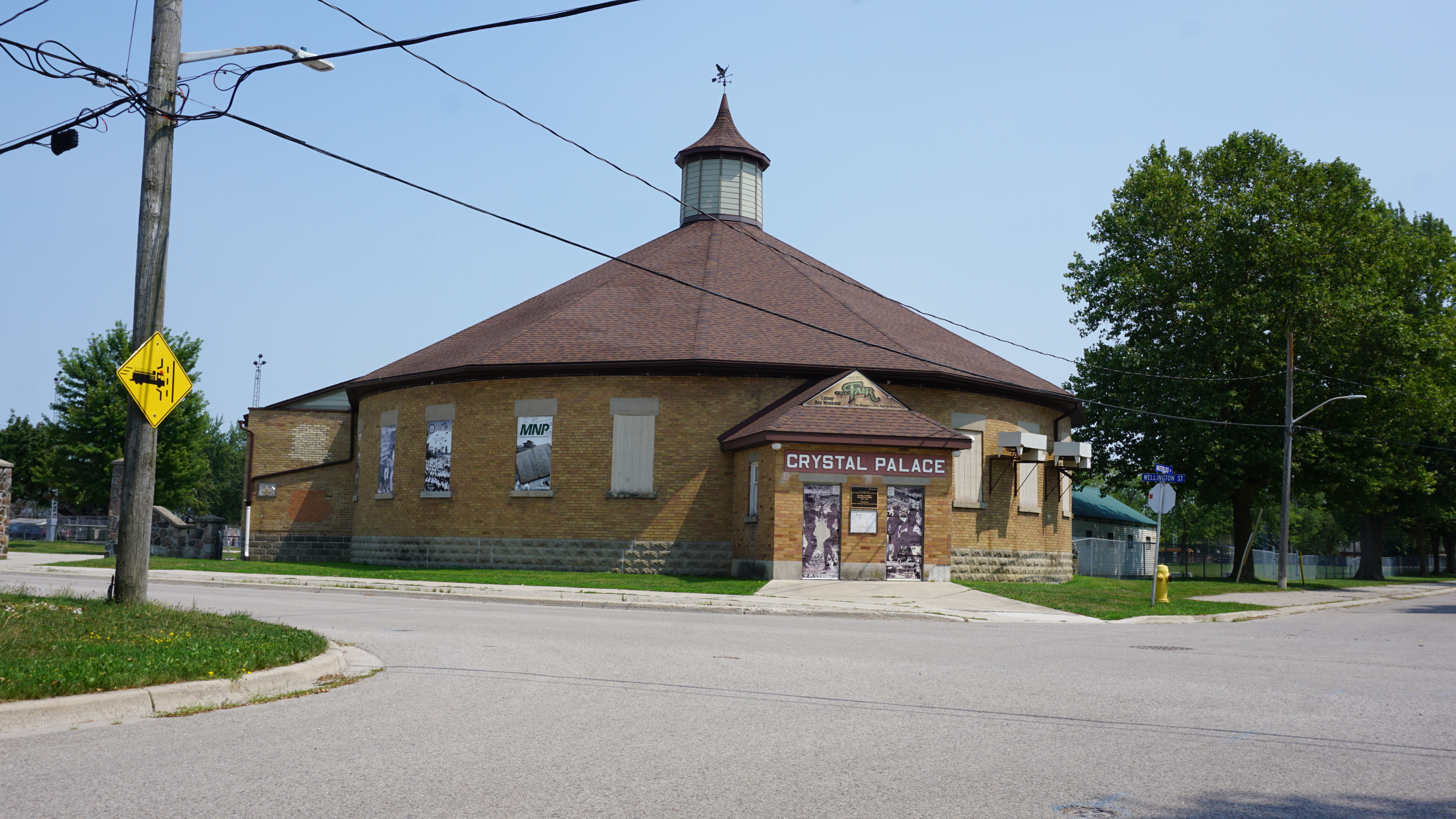
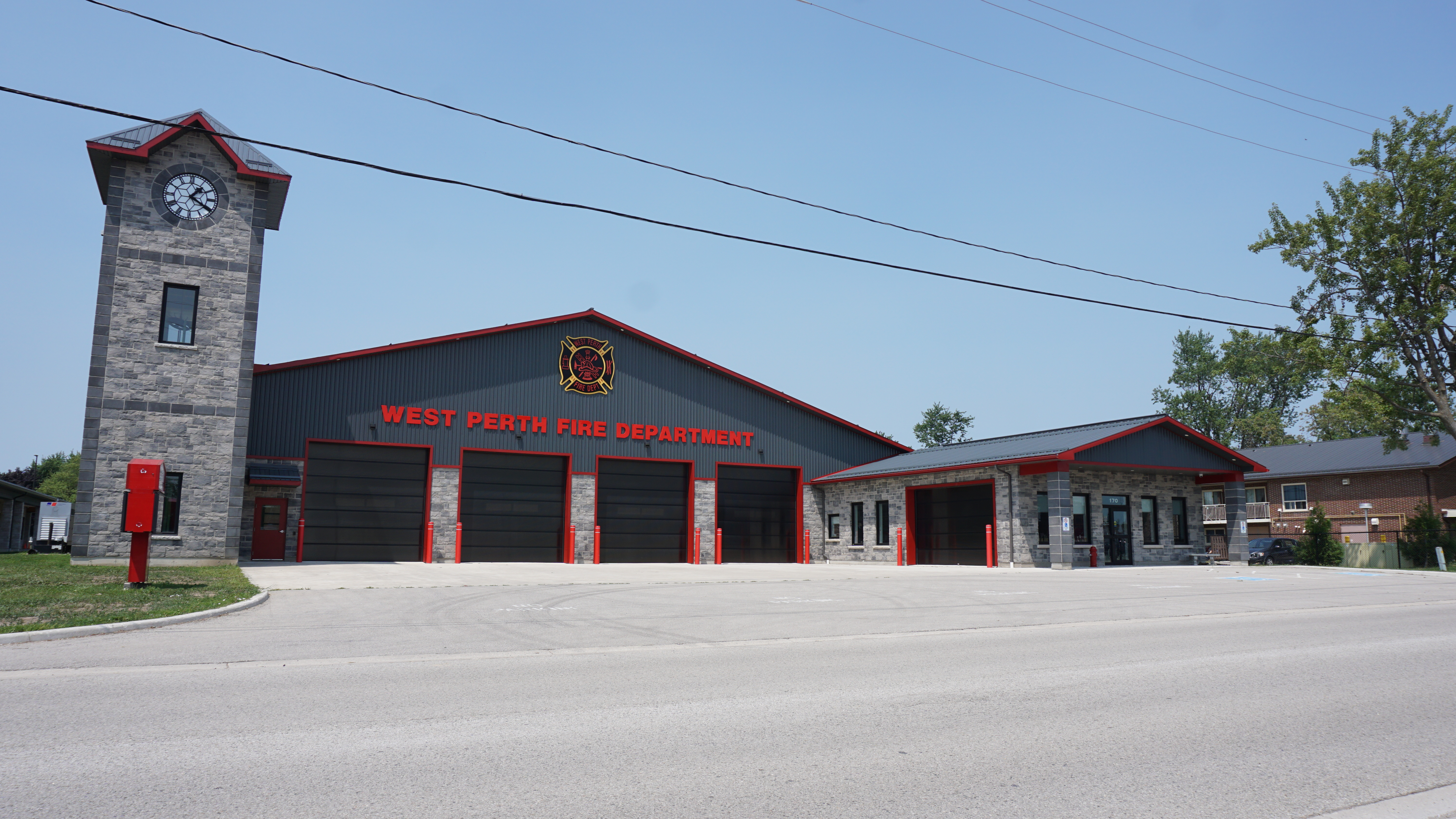
- Ontario Road West Perth Public Library Crystal Palace West Perth Fire Hall
- Interactive map of Mitchell
- Country: Canada
- Province: Ontario
- County: Perth
- Township: West Perth

Area
  - Total: 5.08 km^{2} (1.96 sq mi)

Population (2021)
  - Total: 4,868
  - Density: 958/km^{2} (2,480/sq mi)
- Time zone: UTC-5 (EST)
  - Summer (DST): UTC-4 (EDT)
- Postal code: N0K 1N0
- Area codes: 519, 226

Mitchell is a community in the municipality of West Perth, part of Perth County, Ontario, Canada. It is located at the intersection of Ontario Highways 8 and 23, 20 kilometres (12 mi) northwest of Stratford, and 60 kilometres (37 mi) north of London. Mitchell is no longer a separate entity. On January 1, 1998, the town amalgamated with the neighbouring Townships of Logan, Fullarton, and Hibbert to form the new Municipality of West Perth. As of 2016, the former town of Mitchell has a population of 4,573 in a land area of 4.81 square kilometres (1.86 sq mi); it has 1,827 occupied private dwellings.

== History ==
Mitchell was named for a settler of the same name who built a small shanty on the nearby Thames River. "Perhaps the only place name in Ontario named for a negro". Post office opened in 1842.

According to a historic plaque erected by the Province, the Canada Company laid out a town plot (Mitchell) on the Huron Road in 1836. In 1837 a log building was built by William Hicks along Huron Road; this was the first settlement in the area. A sawmill was built in 1842, and in 1845, stores and other mills opened. By 1851 the population had reached 150. Mitchell was incorporated as a Village in 1857, after the railway reached the area. Mitchell became a Town in 1874, with a population of 2000. The first mayor was Thomas Matheson. A waterworks system was built in 1889; roadways and sidewalks were paved. Electricity arrived in 1889. By 1901, the population had grown to 2,200. In 1918, a large new elementary school was necessary. A high school was built soon after.

== Economy ==
The town's major employers include Parmalat Canada (the former Stacey Brothers creamery), a producer of dairy products, and Cooper Standard Automotive, the Canadian centre for the American company's automotive parts research and development program. Mitchell is an agricultural service centre, surrounded by high-quality farmland. Great Lakes Specialty Meats, a pork producer, has expanded significantly with assistance from Agriculture and Agrifood Canada. In 2011, Mitchell's average per person income was $40,688.

== Municipal government ==
Mitchell is part of the Municipality of West Perth and governed accordingly. The Municipality has a Mayor, Deputy Mayor and nine Councillors; three of these represents the Mitchell Ward. The current Mitchell councillors are Phillip O'Donnell, Murray Rose and Doug Feltz. The Mayor is Walter McKenzie, and the Deputy Mayor is W. Dean Trentowsky.

== Sports ==
Mitchell has a number of hockey, baseball, and ringette teams, and is home to the Mitchell Hawks, a junior hockey team that plays in the PJHL.

Mitchell is the birthplace of professional ice hockey player Howie Morenz. He began his career with the Mitchell Juveniles, 1917–18, and moved to Stratford where he played with several teams there. In 1923 he joined the Montreal Canadiens of the National Hockey League. He remained in the League for 14 years, 12 with Montreal. In 1950 Morenz was voted the outstanding hockey player of the half century by Canadian Press. He was one of the initial nine inductees into the Hockey Hall of Fame.

== Education ==
In the educational sector, Mitchell has two schools, Upper Thames Elementary and Mitchell District High School. Upper Thames Elementary School is a school from J.K. to 6. This school was built in 1970 to serve the rural population (from the former Townships of Logan, Fullarton, and Hibbert), and replaced numerous one and two room schoolhouses in the rural areas. In recent years, grade 7 and 8 children from the former Town of Mitchell started attending MDHS, with all town children now attending since the closure of Mitchell Public School in 2010.

Mitchell District High School, otherwise known as MDHS, is a secondary school serving grades 7-12.

== Wildlife ==
Mitchell is located in southwestern Ontario, which has many small rivers and forests patched throughout the landscape. The Thames River runs through the heart of Mitchell, and dense brush and forests run along the northern and southern edges of the town.

Mitchell is also home to the West Perth Wetlands, a location frequented by migratory bird species. It has become a popular spot for Birders from all over Ontario and parts of the U.S. The site was converted from a decommissioned sewage lagoon and includes two ponds that provide two distinct habitats for birds, a shallow front pond for shorebirds and dabbling ducks and a deeper back pond for ducks, swans and geese to swim.
