= St. Michael Catholic Secondary School =

Canadian Catholic secondary school

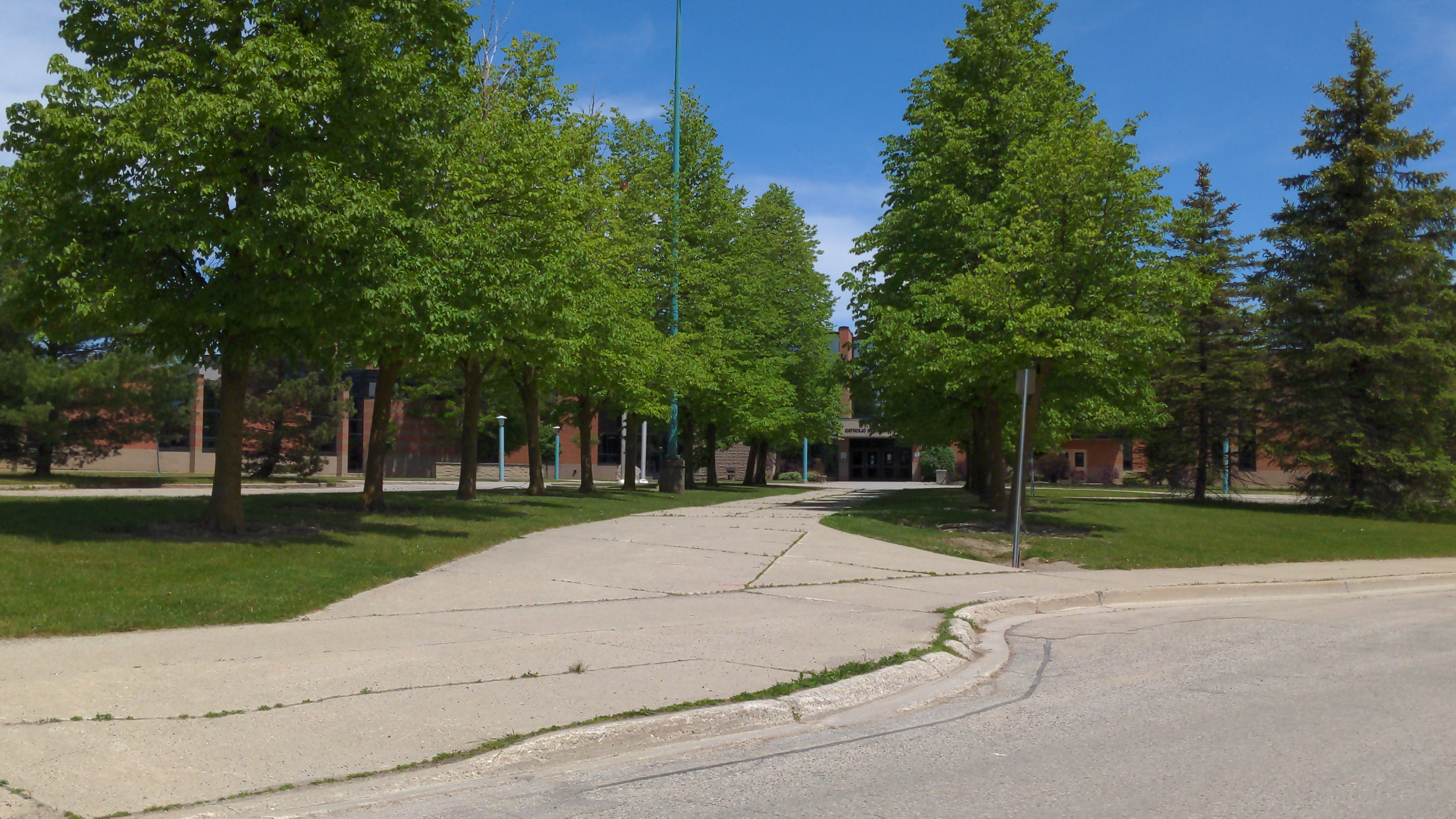

Location
- 240 Oakdale Avenue; Stratford, Ontario, N5A 7W2; Canada

Information
- Other names: St. Mike's, SMCSS
- School type: Separate secondary school
- Motto: Act justly, Love tenderly, Walk humbly with God (Мicah 6:8)
- Religious affiliation: Roman Catholic
- Patron saint: St. Michael
- Established: September 1986; 40 years ago
- School board: Huron-Perth Catholic District School Board
- Area trustee: Tina Doherty
- Principal: Carolyn Bell
- Grades: 9–12
- Enrollment: ~1,000
- Colours: Blue and Gold
- Mascot: Mikey the Warrior
- Nickname: Warriors
- Website: Official website

St. Michael Catholic Secondary School, known locally as St. Mike's, is a Catholic secondary school located in Stratford, Ontario.

The school is one of two secondary schools in Stratford, the other being Stratford District Secondary School. St Mike's is one of two secondary schools in the Huron-Perth Catholic District School Board, the other school being St. Anne's Catholic Secondary School. The school opened in September 1986 on Grange Street, now the home of Jeanne Sauvé Catholic Elementary School, with approximately 60 students. The school moved to the Oakdale Avenue location in September 1993, with an addition to the building being added in 2006.

Approximately 1,000 students attend on an annual basis. The building is unique as it shares a library with Stratford District Secondary School, the city's public high school. A multi-use sports area named Stratford Education Recreation Complex (SERC) surrounds the buildings.

== Athletics ==
St. Mike's is well known for its athletic programs and has had high levels of success. With frequent attendance at OFSAA events, with varying levels of success through the years.

Each year, the students of St. Michael participate in an event called "March for Mike's," where each student is asked to raise at least $40 (CAD). The funds are distributed among all student groups and sports teams to decrease the cost for students to join student groups.

== Clubs and Extracurriculars ==
St. Michael has diverse extracurricular activities that contribute to the school's overall atmosphere. The school supports a band program comprising two bands (jazz and concert band). St. Michael also has a continued tradition of staging a musical and play each academic year, providing experience in the dramatic arts.

== Notable alumni ==
- Justin Bieber (class of 2012) - Singer/Songwriter
- Boyd Devereaux (class of 1995) - former National Hockey League Player
- Rem Murray (class of 1991) - former National Hockey League Player

== See also ==
- Education in Ontario
- List of secondary schools in Ontario
