= Stratford District Secondary School =

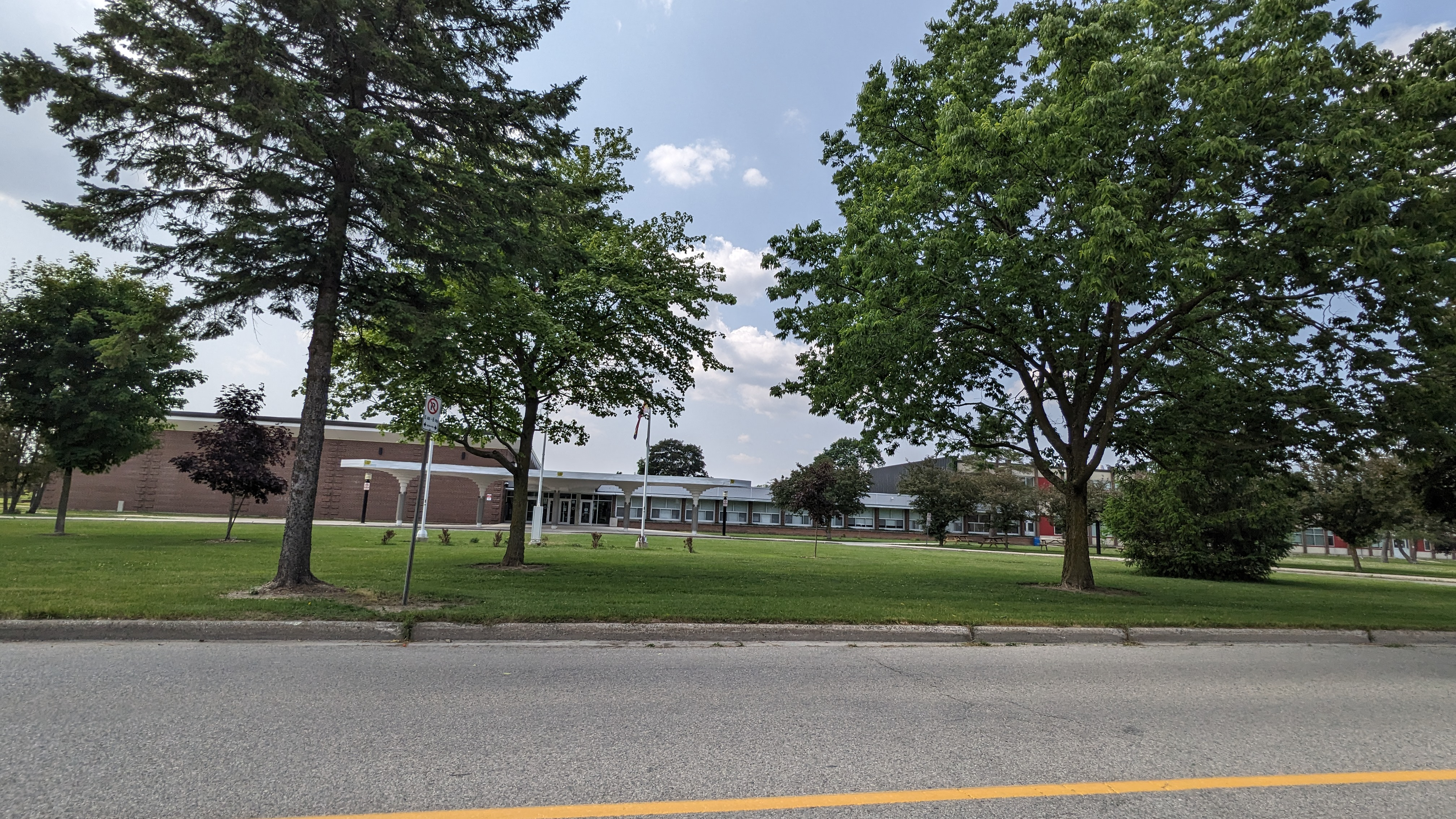
- Street view of the school

Location
- 428 Forman Avenue; Stratford, Ontario; Canada; 43.38497°N 80.99335°W

Information
- Type: Public High School
- Established: 2020
- School board: Avon Maitland District School Board
- Grades: 9-12
- Campus: Suburban
- Colours: Black & Gold
- Team name: Golden Bears
- Newspaper: The Black and Gold
- Website: https://sdss.amdsb.ca/

Stratford District Secondary School is a public secondary school in Stratford, Ontario, Canada.

Students can study a full range of courses to prepare for university, college, apprenticeship and the workforce, along with Five Specialist High Skills Majors (SHSM) courses: Health & Wellness, Energy, Transportation, Manufacturing and Hospitality & Tourism.

In 2014, the school had an enrollment of 1,150 students in grades 7–12.

2014 extra-curricular activities included a wide range of athletics and clubs including Me To We, Fly Fishing Club, Concert Band, Drama Club, E-Team and spring baseball.

In 2025, the school has an enrollment of 1,460 students in grades 9-12.

2025 extra-curricular activities included a wide range of athletics and clubs including baseball, basketball, cross country, rugby, soccer, swimming, tennis, volleyball, Board Game Club, Culinary Club / The Avocado (formerly Screaming Avocado), Debate Club, Golden Bears Broadcasting, Retro Video Game Club, SDSS Music, Stratford Law, Stratford Robotics, and many more.

== Northwestern (1963 - 2020) ==
Stratford Northwestern Secondary School opened in 1963. In September 2003, following the closure of Juliet Public School and King Lear Public School, Grade 7 and 8 students began attending the newly formed Stratford Northwestern Public School.

The school curriculum included unique courses such as cosmetology, horticulture and culinary classes. The culinary class operates an in-school restaurant called The Screaming Avocado, which opened in 2004, where gourmet foods are prepared and served by students as a healthy, balanced alternative to the cafeteria food offered. The Screaming Avocado grows many of its own ingredients in the school's courtyard and greenhouse. The concept has been cited as a potential model for healthier school food practices at other schools. Food Network Canada featured a 13-episode series in 2007 called Fink which followed the adventures of the Northwestern Culinary Club's trip to Italy.

Northwestern was the host school for iCASE, the International Canadian Academy of Sports Excellence offering a combined academic and baseball training program.

In 2020, students from Stratford Central Secondary School were moved to Stratford Northwestern Secondary School, and the school was renamed Stratford District Secondary School. At the same time, Central was renamed Stratford Intermediate School.

== Notable alumni ==
- Justin Bieber attended grades 7 & 8 at Stratford Northwestern.

== See also ==
- Education in Ontario
- List of secondary schools in Ontario
