= Tim Grant (general) =

- Military career
- Allegiance: Canada
- Branch: Canadian Army
- Service years: 1977–2008
- Rank: Major General
- Commands: Land Force Western Area; 1 Canadian Mechanized Brigade Group; Lord Strathcona's Horse (Royal Canadians)
- Conflicts: NATO intervention in Bosnia and Herzegovina; War in Afghanistan
- Awards: Officer of the Order of Military Merit; Meritorious Service Cross; Canadian Forces' Decoration

Major General Timothy James Grant, OMM, MSC, CD is a former (retired 2008) senior officer of the Canadian Army and a retired senior civil servant with the Government of Alberta.

== Education ==
Grant attended the University of Guelph, graduating in 1977 with a Bachelor of Science. Upon graduation he enrolled in the Canadian Forces through the Direct Entry Officer programme, becoming an armour officer. Grant is a graduate of the All-arms Tactics Course (UK), Command and Staff College, the Advanced Military Studies Course and the National Security Studies Course.

== Career ==
During Grant's career he filled many staff positions, such as Chief of Staff, Land Force Western Area and participated in two tours at National Defence Headquarters with the Joint Operations Directorate. Grant was actively involved in planning Canada's contribution to the "Campaign Against Terrorism" which included the first deployment of the Canadian Forces in Afghanistan.

Grant was in command of numerous Canadian Forces units throughout his career, ranging from a single troop to the brigade level in both Canada and in Germany (with NATO). He served as an exchange officer at the Royal Australian Armour Centre.

As commanding officer of Lord Strathcona's Horse (Royal Canadians), he was deployed with his battle group to Bosnia in 1997 with NATO's SFOR. Later, he returned to Bosnia to command the Canadian Forces contingent. Grant was in command of the 1 Canadian Mechanized Brigade Group from 2003 until 2005, which included a deployment to Kabul as part of the International Security Assistance Force and the first Canadian-led Provincial Reconstruction Team to Kandahar.

From November 2006 until August 2007, holding the rank of brigadier general, Grant was in command of all Canadian Forces in Afghanistan. Grant was promoted to major general after he finished his tour in Afghanistan and took the position of Deputy Commander Canadian Expeditionary Force Command in October 2007. He retired from the Canadian Armed Forces in August 2008, immediately joining the civil service of the Government of Alberta, and as of 2023 has been a deputy minister in various ministries since October 2011.
