= Brittlestar =

Comedian and communications consultant

- Born: Stewart Reynolds; Stratford, Ontario
- Occupations: Comedian and marketeer
- Website: www.brittlestar.com

Brittlestar is the stage name of Stewart Reynolds, a Stratford, Ontario-based comedian, writer, communications consultant, and online television show host.

His campaign for KFC Canada was the world's most watched branded video on Facebook in the summer of 2017.

== Family life ==
Reynolds was born to Scottish immigrants Bette (b. 1947) and Stuart (d. 2024), and is based in Stratford, Ontario. Bette appeared on the 13th season of The Voice UK.

== Career ==
As a comedian, Reynolds brands himself as "the internet’s favourite dad." Recurring themes in his work are parodies of Canadian politicians, 1980s nostalgia, and support for public health messages about the COVID-19 pandemic. He uses his influence to support charitable causes including the Christmas Wish Tree program and Women's Crisis Services of Waterloo Region.

Reynolds co-hosts a daily online morning show called The Morning Show Thing with his wife Shannon.

In the Summer of 2017, Reynolds' media campaign for KFC Canada was the global most popular branded video on Facebook.

In April 2022, Reynolds collaborated on comedy videos with Gurdeep Pandher and in December 2022 he released a Christmas music video with actor Emma Rudy Put On Another Christmas Song.

== Selected publications ==
- Nineteen Fifty Now, 2018, short story
- Shortcuts, 2017, ISBN 978-1522001317
- Lessons from Cats for Surviving Fascism, 2024, ISBN 978-1538778005
