= Central Huron Secondary School =

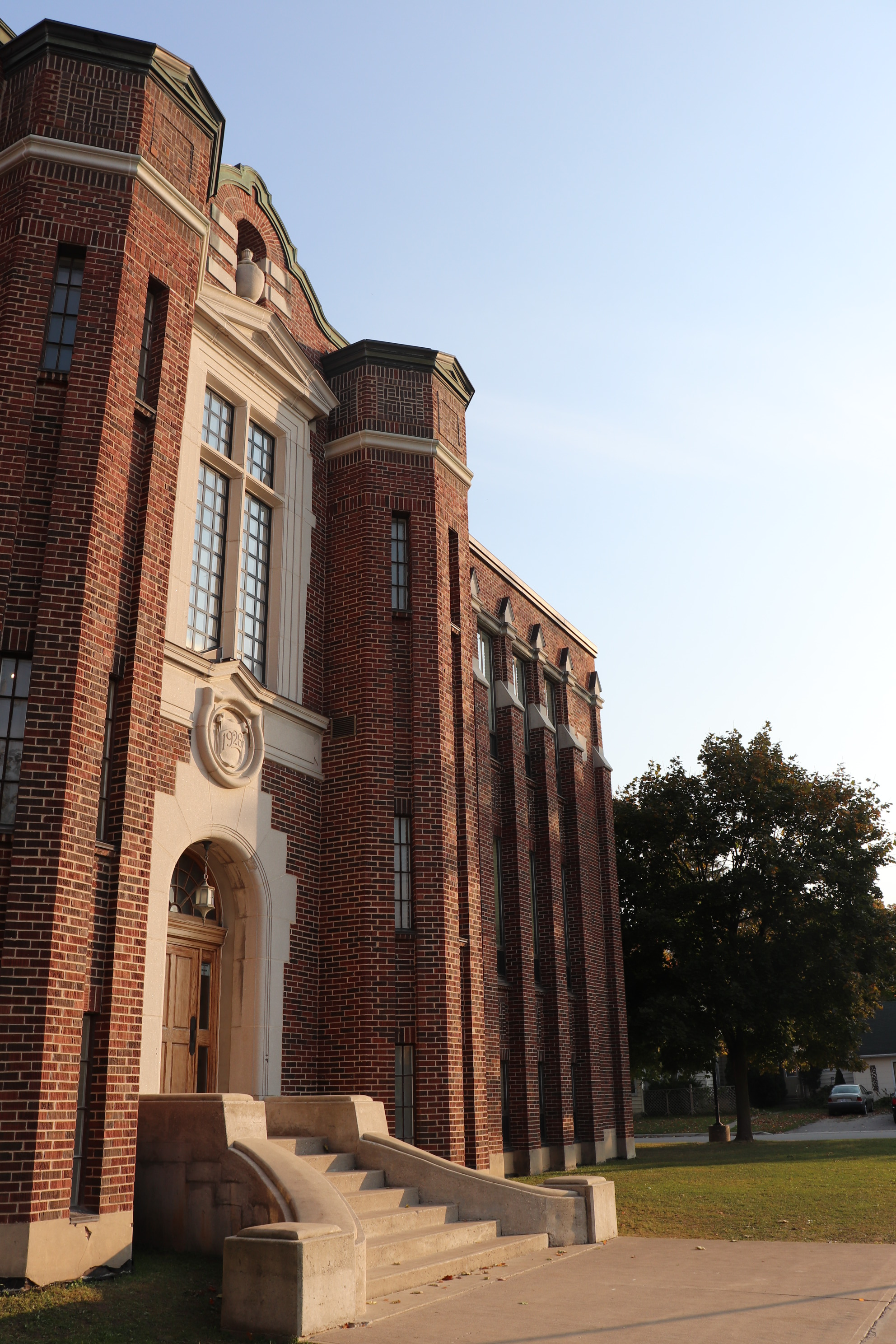

Location
- 165 Princess Street, East; Clinton, Ontario, N0M 1L0; Canada

Information
- School type: High School
- Motto: 'Hinc Lucem' ('From this place, Light')
- Founded: 1866
- School board: Avon Maitland District School Board
- Principal: Scott Richardson
- Grades: 9 - 12
- Enrolment: 600
- Language: English
- Colours: Red, Blue
- Mascot: Phoenix
- Team name: Phoenix
- Website: chss.amdsb.ca

Central Huron Secondary School ('CHSS') is a secondary school in Clinton, Ontario. The school opened in 1866.

Central Huron Secondary School ('CHSS') is a secondary school in Clinton, On. The school opened in 1866. Although High School classes had been held in the Clinton Masonic Lodge as early as the mid-1850s, it was not until 1866 that Clinton High School was formally established. In 1877, the original Clinton High School building was erected. It was a structure built in the Second Empire style with a centre block tower and mansard roof. The school was officially designated a Collegiate in 1885 because it offered courses in classical studies (Greek and Latin). A new building constructed in 1926 replaced the original school. The 1926 building was built in the Tudor style and is the oldest school building still in use as an educational institution in Huron County. The school was known as Clinton Collegiate Institute until 1946 when it was changed to Clinton District Collegiate Institute. It was renamed Central Huron Secondary School in 1962. In 2002, it amalgamated with the former Seaforth District High School.

== Notable alumni ==
- Robert H. Coats (born July 25, 1874, in Goderich Twp.-d. Feb. 7, 1960) (class of 1892). Economic Historian and founder of Dominion Bureau of Statistics (Stats Can.). Coats building in Ottawa is named after him.
- George Robson Coldwell (born 4 July 1858, Durham County, ON – d. 24 January 1924, Brandon, Man.) (attended Clinton High School in early 1870s), lawyer, founder Brandon Manitoba Opera House; Manitoba Minister of Education, 1908–1915.
- William James Dunlop (born June 24, 1881, in Durham, ON-d. Feb. 2, 1961 in Toronto) (class of 1899). Instructor, Canadian Officer Training Corps, 1915–16; editor Canadian Historical Review; Ontario Minister of Education, 1951–59; Minister Without Portfolio, 1959–61; Grand Master of the Masonic Lodge of Canada in the Province of Ontario, 1937–38.
- Horatio Hale (born May 3, 1817, in New Port, New Hampshire-d. Dec. 28, 1896 in Clinton, Ont.). Hale was born in New Hampshire. He was a relative of American patriot Nathan Hale. His mother Sarah Hale edited Godey's Lady Book and is believed to have written the children's rhyme 'Mary Had A Little Lamb.' Hale graduated from Harvard University in 1837 with a law degree. He became interested in native languages and was appointed philologist on the Wilkes Scientific and Exploration Expedition (1838-1842) that explored the Antarctic and Polynesian regions. Hale was instrumental in cataloging the scientific specimens from the expedition that would later form the basis of the Natural History Museum at the Smithsonian in Washington, D.C. He wrote several anthropological works on the Polynesian and Native North American peoples. He married Margaret Pugh from Clinton, Ontario in 1855 and relocated there the following year. He was a founder and first Chair of the newly established Clinton Collegiate Institute in 1877. He died in Clinton in 1896.
- Honore Jaxon (née Henry Jackson) (born May 13, 1861, in Toronto-d. Jan. 10, 1952 in New York City) (class of 1879). Jackson moved to Manitoba and although an English speaking Methodist, he identified with the Metis cause, converted to Catholicism and adopted the name Honore Jaxon. He became Metis leader Louis Riel's English Secretary. Jaxon was captured by Canadian forces at the Battle of Batoche in May 1885. He was tried for treason but declared not guilty by reason of insanity. He escaped the asylum to Chicago. Jaxon became the first Canadian convert to the Bahá'í Faith. He died penniless and homeless in New York City on January 10, 1952.
- Emily Kate Johnston (born May 19, 1984, London, ON---) (Class of 2002) Johnston is the author of the best selling young adult novel The Story of Owen: Dragon Slayer of Trondheim. (2014). The setting for Johnston's novel is Central Huron Secondary School and Huron County.
- Russell Temple Kelley (b. Sept. 10, 1877 in Bruce Co.-d. Feb. 20, 1952 in Hamilton, ON) (Class of 1896)Kelley founded the Kelley Advertising Agency; President of the United Nations Society of Canada; Director of the Canadian Chamber of Commerce; President of the National Council of the Y.M.C.A; President of the Ontario Lacrosse Association; Ontario Minister of Health 1946–1950; Minister Without Portfolio 1950–1952.
- Benjamin T. Lobb (b. Sept. 10, 1976 in Goderich Twp- ) (class of 1995) elected Member of Dominion Parliament for Huron Bruce 2008–present.
- Kenneth W. MacKenzie (b. Feb 3, 1862 in Lucknow, ON–d. October 9, 1929 in Edmonton, Alta.) (attended Clinton Collegiate in the 1870s), teacher, Edmonton City Councillor, two-term Mayor of Edmonton, Alta 1899–1901, President Edmonton Board of Trade (1903); President Associated Boards of Trade for Western Canada, 1908).
- Bobby Mair (born January 5, 1986, in London, ON-) (class of 2005)stand-up comedian based in London, U.K; has made regular appearances on television shows Never Mind the Buzzcocks, Sweat the Small Stuff, and Virtually Famous. Mair co-stars with wife and fellow comedian Harriet Kemsley in television series Bobby and Harriet Get Married.
- Hon. William Melville Martin P.C., K.C., LL.D. (born August 23, 1876, in Norwich, ON-d. June 22, 1970, Saskatoon) (class of 1894) Second Premier of Saskatchewan 1916–1922; Chief Justice of Saskatchewan Court of Appeals 1948–61; Grand Master of Saskatchewan Masonic Order, 1927.
- Sir John Cunningham McLennan, K.B.E; F.R.S; F.R.S.C. (born 14 April 1867 in Ingersoll, ON-d. October 9, 1935, Abbeville, France) (class of 1883) Teacher, author of A Laboratory Course in Comprehensive Physics (1895); first Canadian Ph.D. in physics at University of Toronto in 1900; pioneer researcher in electro-magnetism, and radiation; elected Fellow of the Royal Society of Canada, 1903; Chair of Royal Navy Board of Inventions and Research, 1915–1919; elected Fellow of Royal Society (Great Britain); awarded Order of the British Empire, 1917; President of the Royal Canadian Institute, 1916–17; author of 150 academic publications; Knighted by His Majesty King George V, 1935. Lord Rutherford called McLennan 'the acknowledged leader of science in Canada' in his obituary in The Times of London (taken from Robert Craig Brown in the Dictionary of Canadian Biography.
- Hon. Carol Mitchell (b. Clinton, ON., 1957) (class of 19--) Warden of Huron County 1999–2000; elected Member of Provincial Parliament 2003; Provincial Minister of Agricultural, Food and Rural Affairs, 2010–2011.

=== Notable alumni from the former Seaforth District High School ===
- Howard Hillen Kerr(b. December 24, 1900 McKillop Twp., ON-d. June 16, 1984, Toronto, ON) (Seaforth Class of 1919) founding principal of Ryerson Polytechnical Institute, 1948–1966; Chair of the Council of Regents for Colleges of Applied Arts and Technology, 1966–69.

== See also ==
- Education in Ontario
- List of secondary schools in Ontario
