= Stratford, Ontario =

City in Ontario, Canada

Stratford
- City (single-tier)
- City of Stratford
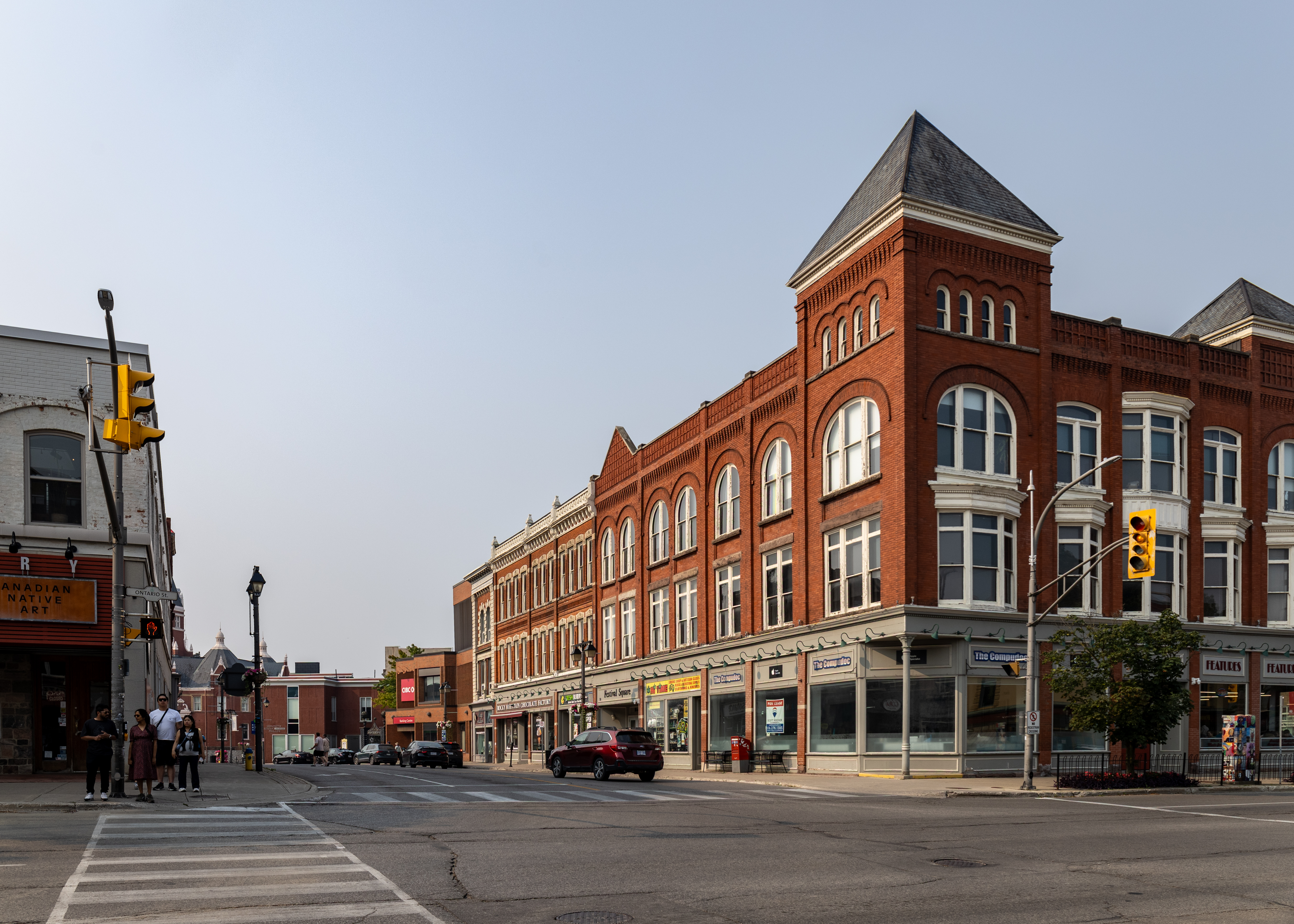
- Downie Street at Ontario Street

- Logo
- Nickname: Festival City
- Motto: Industria et Ars ("Industry and Art")
- Location within Perth County Location within Southern Ontario Location within Ontario Location within Canada
- Coordinates: 43°22′15″N 80°58′55″W
- Country: Canada
- Province: Ontario
- Settled: 1832
- Incorporated: 1858 (town)
- Incorporated: 1886 (city)
- Named for: Stratford-upon-Avon, England

Government
  - Mayor: Martin Ritsma
  - Council: Stratford City Council
  - MPs: John Nater (CPC)
  - MPPs: Matthew Rae (PC)

Area
  - Land: 30.02 km^{2} (11.59 sq mi)
- Elevation: 345 m (1,132 ft)

Population (2021)
  - Total: 33,232
  - Density: 1,107/km^{2} (2,870/sq mi)
- Time zone: UTC−5 (EST)
  - Summer (DST): UTC−4 (EDT)
- Forward sortation area: N4Z, N5A
- Area codes: 519, 226, and 548
- Website: www.stratfordcanada.ca

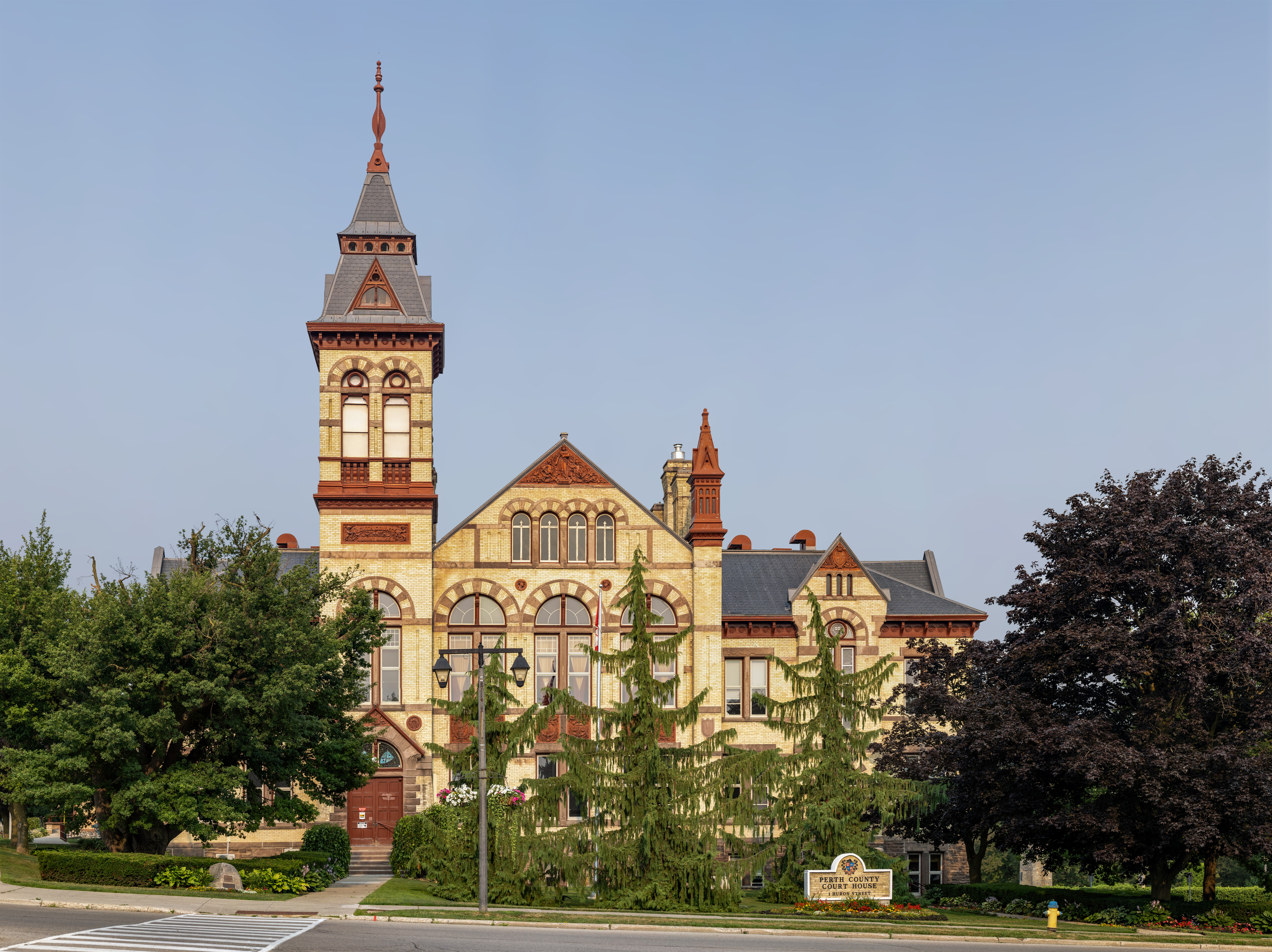
Perth County Courthouse, Stratford, Ontario

Stratford is a city on the Avon River geographically within (but administratively separated from) Perth County in southwestern Ontario, Canada, with a 2021 population of 33,232 in a land area of 30.02 square kilometres (11.59 sq mi). Stratford is the seat of Perth County, which was settled by English, Irish, Scottish and German immigrants, in almost equal numbers, starting in the 1820s but primarily in the 1830s and 1840s. Most became farmers; even today, the area around Stratford is known for mixed farming, dairying and hog production.

The area was settled by Europeans in 1832, and the town and river were named after Stratford-upon-Avon, England. Stratford was incorporated as a town in 1859 and as a city in 1886. The first mayor was John Corry Wilson Daly. The swan has become a symbol of the city. Each year, twenty-four white swans are released into the Avon River. The town is noted for the Stratford Festival, which performs Shakespearean plays and other genres from May to October.

== History ==
In 1832, the development of an area called "Little Thames" as the market centre for the eastern Huron Tract began. By 1834 a tavern, sawmill and grist mill had opened, and by 1835 a post office, called Stratford, was operating. The Smith's Canadian Gazetteer of 1846 describes Stratford as follows: "Stratford contains about 200 inhabitants. Post Office, post three times a-week. Professions and Trades.—Two physicians and surgeons, one grist and saw mill, one tannery, three stores, one brewery, one distillery, one ashery, two taverns, two blacksmiths, one saddler, two wheelwrights, three shoemakers, two tailors. Settlement was slow until the early 1850s when the railway arrived.

Furniture manufacturing and railway locomotive repairs were the most important parts of the local economy by the twentieth century. In 1933 a general strike, started by the furniture workers and led by the Communist-backed Workers' Unity League, marked the last time the army was deployed to break a strike in Canada. The Grand Trunk Railway (later CNR) locomotive repair shops were the major employer for many years, employing 40% of the population.

=== Timeline ===
- 1828 - Settlement began.
- 1832 - Thomas Mercer Jones, an agent of the Canada Company, named the village "Stratford" and renamed the portion of the Thames River running through it the "Avon River." The first sawmill, hotel (Shakespeare Hotel) and gristmill opened.
- 1834 - The community had a tavern, sawmill and grist mill; in 1835 the first post office opened.
- 1849 - The Perth County News was Stratford's first weekly newspaper.
- 1853 - Perth County was created, with Stratford as its county seat.
- 1854 - Stratford was incorporated as a village.
- 1856 - Stratford became a railway town with the arrival of the Grand Trunk and Buffalo-Lake Huron railways.
- 1859 - Stratford was incorporated as a town.
- 1864 - The 17-year-old American telegraph operator Thomas Edison briefly lived at 46 Ontario Street.
- 1871 - A major railway repair yard opened (the town's major employer by 1901) and helped accelerate the town's population growth.
- 1885 - Stratford was incorporated as a city with a population of 9,000.
- 1887 - The second and current Perth County Courthouse opened; it has received praise for its High Victorian architecture, with several Queen Anne features, and Richardsonian Romanesque elements.
- 1898 - The massive red brick town hall, in the Victorian "Picturesque" style, with a prominent clock tower, began construction.
- 1900 - January 29 Stratford City Hall opens; along with its 800-seat auditorium with a balcony and stage.
- 1903 - The first public library opened, built with C$15,000 of financial assistance from American steel magnate Andrew Carnegie.
- 1908 - The Stratford Normal School opened to train teachers; in 1953 it was renamed the Stratford Teachers' College. The school trains nearly 14,000 teachers before closing in 1973.
- 1909 - The GTR (later CNR) locomotive repair shops building was completed; it is 16,800 square metres (182,000 square feet) in size.
- 1918 - A gift from J.C. Garden, a pair of mute swans come to live in Stratford. The swan population would expand over subsequent years.
- 1920s - Stratford is already a major furniture manufacturing centre; nearly one-sixth of furniture made in Canada was shipped from Stratford. (All major manufacturing ceased by 2006.)
- 1933 - The army was called in to attempt to end a general strike (mostly of furniture workers) and remove communist leaders, but fails, marking the last time military force was used on a labour strike in Canada.
- 1936 - The Shakespearean Gardens were created, primarily through the efforts of R, Thomas Orr.
- 1953 - The Stratford Shakespearean Festival Theatre opened through the efforts of a Stratford journalist, Tom Patterson.
- 1957 - The Festival moved into its first permanent structure, the Festival Theatre.
- 1964 - The CNR shops closed and laid off numerous employees.
- 1976 - The Stratford City Hall was designated a National Historic Site of Canada.
- 1979 - an F4 tornado tore through the community. The tornado travelled for 39 kilometres and levelled approximately 10 houses.
- 1992 - The Stratford Armoury was recognised as a Federal Heritage building on the Register of the Government of Canada Heritage Buildings.
- 1993 - Stratford's former Canadian National Railways (VIA Rail) Station was designated a Federal Heritage building.
- 1997 - Nations in Bloom crowned Stratford the "Prettiest City in the World."
- 2003 - The Stratford Festival of Canada celebrated its 50th season. A record 672,925 patrons visited and 18 plays were held. Following the 50-year record volume of playgoers, the Avon Theatre underwent a complete renewal and the Studio Theatre, a fourth theatre space seating 250 people more, was added.

== Geography ==
=== Climate ===
Stratford has a humid continental climate type (Köppen: Dfb). The highest temperature ever recorded in Stratford was 38.9 °C (102 °F) in July 1936. The coldest temperature ever recorded was −35 °C (−31 °F) in January 1882. Stratford has warm summers that are lengthy by Canadian standards with cool nights and long, cold, and snowy winters. Precipitation is very high year round.

Climate data for Stratford, 1981−2010 normals, extremes 1865−present (Note: Climate data was recorded in the City of Stratford from January 1865 to August 1959 and at the Stratford Wastewater Treatment Plant from October 1959 to present.)
Month	Jan	Feb	Mar	Apr	May	Jun	Jul	Aug	Sep	Oct	Nov	Dec	Year
Record high °C (°F)	15.6 (60.1)	15.5 (59.9)	26.5 (79.7)	29.4 (84.9)	33.0 (91.4)	36.0 (96.8)	38.9 (102.0)	38.3 (100.9)	37.2 (99.0)	29.5 (85.1)	23.9 (75.0)	18.0 (64.4)	38.9 (102.0)
Mean daily maximum °C (°F)	−2.6 (27.3)	−1.2 (29.8)	3.5 (38.3)	11.3 (52.3)	18.3 (64.9)	23.6 (74.5)	25.8 (78.4)	24.7 (76.5)	20.6 (69.1)	13.3 (55.9)	6.2 (43.2)	0.1 (32.2)	12.0 (53.6)
Daily mean °C (°F)	−6.0 (21.2)	−5.0 (23.0)	−0.7 (30.7)	6.4 (43.5)	12.7 (54.9)	17.9 (64.2)	20.2 (68.4)	19.2 (66.6)	15.3 (59.5)	9.0 (48.2)	3.1 (37.6)	−2.8 (27.0)	7.4 (45.3)
Mean daily minimum °C (°F)	−9.5 (14.9)	−8.7 (16.3)	−4.9 (23.2)	1.5 (34.7)	7.0 (44.6)	12.1 (53.8)	14.5 (58.1)	13.6 (56.5)	10.0 (50.0)	4.6 (40.3)	−0.1 (31.8)	−5.8 (21.6)	2.9 (37.2)
Record low °C (°F)	−35.0 (−31.0)	−34.4 (−29.9)	−30.6 (−23.1)	−16.7 (1.9)	−7.2 (19.0)	−2.2 (28.0)	2.8 (37.0)	−0.6 (30.9)	−6.7 (19.9)	−11.1 (12.0)	−23.9 (−11.0)	−31.1 (−24.0)	−35.0 (−31.0)
Average precipitation mm (inches)	96.5 (3.80)	70.5 (2.78)	66.0 (2.60)	80.2 (3.16)	91.7 (3.61)	76.5 (3.01)	102.1 (4.02)	83.9 (3.30)	102.3 (4.03)	89.7 (3.53)	104.9 (4.13)	105.2 (4.14)	1,069.6 (42.11)
Average rainfall mm (inches)	28.8 (1.13)	28.9 (1.14)	39.9 (1.57)	74.7 (2.94)	91.4 (3.60)	76.5 (3.01)	102.1 (4.02)	83.9 (3.30)	102.3 (4.03)	88.4 (3.48)	87.0 (3.43)	47.2 (1.86)	851.2 (33.51)
Average snowfall cm (inches)	67.7 (26.7)	41.6 (16.4)	26.1 (10.3)	5.5 (2.2)	0.3 (0.1)	0.0 (0.0)	0.0 (0.0)	0.0 (0.0)	0.0 (0.0)	1.3 (0.5)	17.9 (7.0)	58.1 (22.9)	218.5 (86.0)
Average precipitation days (≥ 0.2 mm)	18.9	13.6	13.0	13.0	13.0	10.5	11.1	11.2	12.8	14.2	15.9	17.7	165.0
Average rainy days (≥ 0.2 mm)	4.2	4.1	6.6	11.4	12.9	10.5	11.1	11.2	12.8	14.2	11.8	6.9	117.7
Average snowy days (≥ 0.2 cm)	15.6	10.6	7.1	2.2	0.12	0.0	0.0	0.0	0.0	0.50	4.7	12.1	53.0
Source: Environment Canada

== Demographics ==
In the 2021 Census of Population conducted by Statistics Canada, Stratford had a population of 33,232 living in 14,743 of its 15,388 total private dwellings, a change of 5.6% from its 2016 population of 31,470. With a land area of 30.02 km^{2} (11.59 sq mi), it had a population density of 1,107.0/km^{2} (2,867.1/sq mi) in 2021.

Canada census – Stratford, Ontario community profile

	2021	2016	2011
Population	33,232 (5.6% from 2016)	31,465 (1.8% from 2011)	30,903 (1.2% from 2006)
Land area	30.02 km^{2} (11.59 sq mi)	28.28 km^{2} (10.92 sq mi)	26.95 km^{2} (10.41 sq mi)
Population density	1,107.0/km^{2} (2,867/sq mi)	1,112.5/km^{2} (2,881/sq mi)	1,146.0/km^{2} (2,968/sq mi)
Median age	46.0 (M: 43.6, F: 48.4)	45.4 (M: 43.4, F: 47.3)	43.8 (M: 41.7, F: 45.7)
Private dwellings	15,388 (total)	14,302 (total)	13,892 (total)
Median household income

References: 2021 2016 2011

Historical populations
Year	Pop.	±%
1841	200	—
1871	4,313	+2056.5%
1881	8,239	+91.0%
1891	9,500	+15.3%
1901	9,959	+4.8%
1911	12,946	+30.0%
1921	16,094	+24.3%
1931	17,742	+10.2%
1941	16,923	−4.6%
1951	18,785	+11.0%
1961	20,467	+9.0%
1971	24,508	+19.7%
1981	26,262	+7.2%
1991	27,666	+5.3%
1996	28,987	+4.8%
2001	29,676	+2.4%
2006	30,461	+2.6%
2011	30,886	+1.4%

Population by mother tongue
Group	2016 Census		2011 Census		2006 Census		2001 Census		1996 Census	
Group	Population	% of total	Population	% of total	Population	% of Total	Population	% of Total	Population	% of Total
English	28,370	91.8	28,085	92	27,485	91.6	26,585	91.2	26,085	91.5
French	200	.6	225	0.7	200	0.7	210	0.7	125	0.4
English and French	45	.1	35	0.1	20	0.1	40	0.1	45	0.1
All other	2,300	7.4	2,170	7.1	2,320	7.7	2,345	8	2,290	8
Total	30,915	100	30,515	100	30,025	100	29,185	100	28,550	100

Mobility over previous five years
Group	2011 Census		2006 Census		2001 Census		1996 Census	
Group	Population	% of total	Population	% of Total	Population	% of Total	Population	% of Total
At the same address			17,110	60.3	15,205	55.3	14,530	54.6
In the same municipality			6,885	24.3	11,420	41.6	7,780	29.2
In the same province			3,700	13.0	11,420	41.6	3,680	13.8
From another province			395	1.4	850	3.1	430	1.6
From another country			290	1.0	850	3.1	205	0.8
Total aged 5 or over			28,380	100.0	27,475	100.0	26,625	100.0

== Economy ==
The city is in a successful agricultural area and has some auto parts manufacturing, but tourism is still the most significant aspect. According to an estimate by the Conference Board of Canada, it generates $140 million in economic activity, $65 million in taxes and 3,000 direct and indirect jobs. For the past few years however, the town has been working to attract more technical industries with former Mayor Dan Mathieson spearheading the effort. The Royal Bank of Canada opened a $300 million data centre here, Starwood Hotels is experimenting with a new type of call centre, and the University of Waterloo has opened a satellite campus with about 500 students specializing in digital media and information technology, and as the home of the technology forum Canada 3.0 and various technology companies.

== Arts and culture ==
=== Stratford Festival ===
The Stratford Shakespeare Festival began in 1953 when, on July 13, actor Alec Guinness spoke the first lines of the first play produced by the festival.

The performances during the first four seasons took place in a concrete amphitheatre covered by giant canvas tent on the banks of the River Avon. The first of many years of Stratford Shakespeare Festival production history started with a six-week season, opening on 13 July 1953, with Richard III and then All's Well That Ends Well both starring Alec Guinness. The 1954 season ran for nine weeks and included Sophocles' Oedipus Rex and two Shakespeare plays, Measure for Measure and The Taming of the Shrew. Young actors during the first four seasons included several who went on to great success in subsequent years, Douglas Campbell, Timothy Findley, Don Harron, William Hutt and Douglas Rain.

The new Festival Theatre was dedicated on 30 June 1957, with seating for over 1,800 people; none are more than 65 feet from the thrust stage. Over the years, additional theatrical venues were added: the Avon Theatre, the Tom Patterson Theatre (originally Shakespeare 3 Company) and the Studio Theatre. The annual festival now draws hundreds of thousands of theatre goers and tourists to the area each year. Acclaimed actors including Alec Guinness, Christopher Plummer, Dame Maggie Smith, William Hutt, Martha Henry and William Shatner have performed at the festival. The Canadian novelist and playwright Timothy Findley performed in the first season, and had an ongoing relationship with the festival, eventually moving to Stratford in 1997.

From 1956 to 1961 and 1971 to 1976, the Stratford Festival also staged the separate Stratford Film Festival, which was credited as one of the first North American film festivals ever to schedule international films. That festival collapsed after the 1976 launch of the Festival of Festivals, now known as the Toronto International Film Festival, impacted both the Stratford Film Festival's funding and its audience.

=== Music ===
The Stratford Summer Music Festival has been held for seven seasons and features indoor and outdoor performances by international, classical, and world music artists as well as young Canadian performers around downtown Stratford.

The Stratford Concert Band, a local wind ensemble, was founded as the Grand Trunk Railway Employees Band, and renamed the Canadian National Railway Employees' Band in 1907. The band performs free outdoor concerts at the Kiwanis Pavilion Bandshell in Upper Queen's Park throughout the summer.

=== Pride and the 2SLGBTQIA+ Community ===
Stratford is home to year-round 2SLGBTQIA+ programming and events.

Since 2018, Stratford has been home to pride festivities during the month of June (for Pride Month). Planned and implemented by Stratford-Perth Pride, pride month in Stratford typically includes a pride parade, drag show, family-friendly pride in the park event, and flag raisings. In November 2021, Stratford-Perth Pride launched its first annual Trans Pride Week - a week of celebrations honouring the trans and nonbinary community.

Stratford is also home to the Stratford Pride Community Centre (SPCC). The SPCC is a physical space located in downtown Stratford for the 2SLGBTQIA+ community to visit during drop-in hours and attend social events. The SPCC also hosts Stratford's Winter Pride event which takes place in February of each year.

Since 2021, Stratford District Secondary School (SDSS) and Stratford Intermediate School (SIS) has been putting their yearly budget toward including 2SLGBTQIA+ community to help those students feel included.

== Attractions ==
Numerous visitors arrive in Stratford each week during the May to October Festival season. National Geographic Traveler considers the theatres to be "nirvana" and also praises other aspects of the town. "During the festival—which stages everything from Shakespeare to Sondheim to new Canadian plays—you can stay in theatre-themed B&Bs, hang out with actors post-show at local bars, go on backstage tours, and attend dozens of other events with other theatre-mad folk. Stratford itself is the type of walkable wholesome town Rodgers and Hammerstein might write a musical about."

In addition to the festival, several annual events attract visitors. Stratford Summer Music, in its 17th year, runs for about a month. In 2016, the event, run by the town, offered 85 concerts, a third of them free or "pay what you can". The 2016 budget was $800,000 with funding provided by agencies such as the Ontario Cultural Attractions Fund. Smaller event are held in other months, including winter and the Swan Weekend in April, to attract off-season visitors. Fans of Stratford-born musician Justin Bieber frequently visit the town, and Stratford Tourism has produced a "Bieber-iffic Map" showing sites associated with his life in Stratford. In 2018, the Stratford Perth Museum opened "Steps to Stardom," an exhibit documenting Bieber's early career in Stratford. Some town locals are known to refer to Stratford as "the big S", drawing in fans year after year.

Stratford is also known for its Wright Business Park and hosts tech conferences like the 2025 AI Summit with speaker Avery Swartz.

== Sports ==
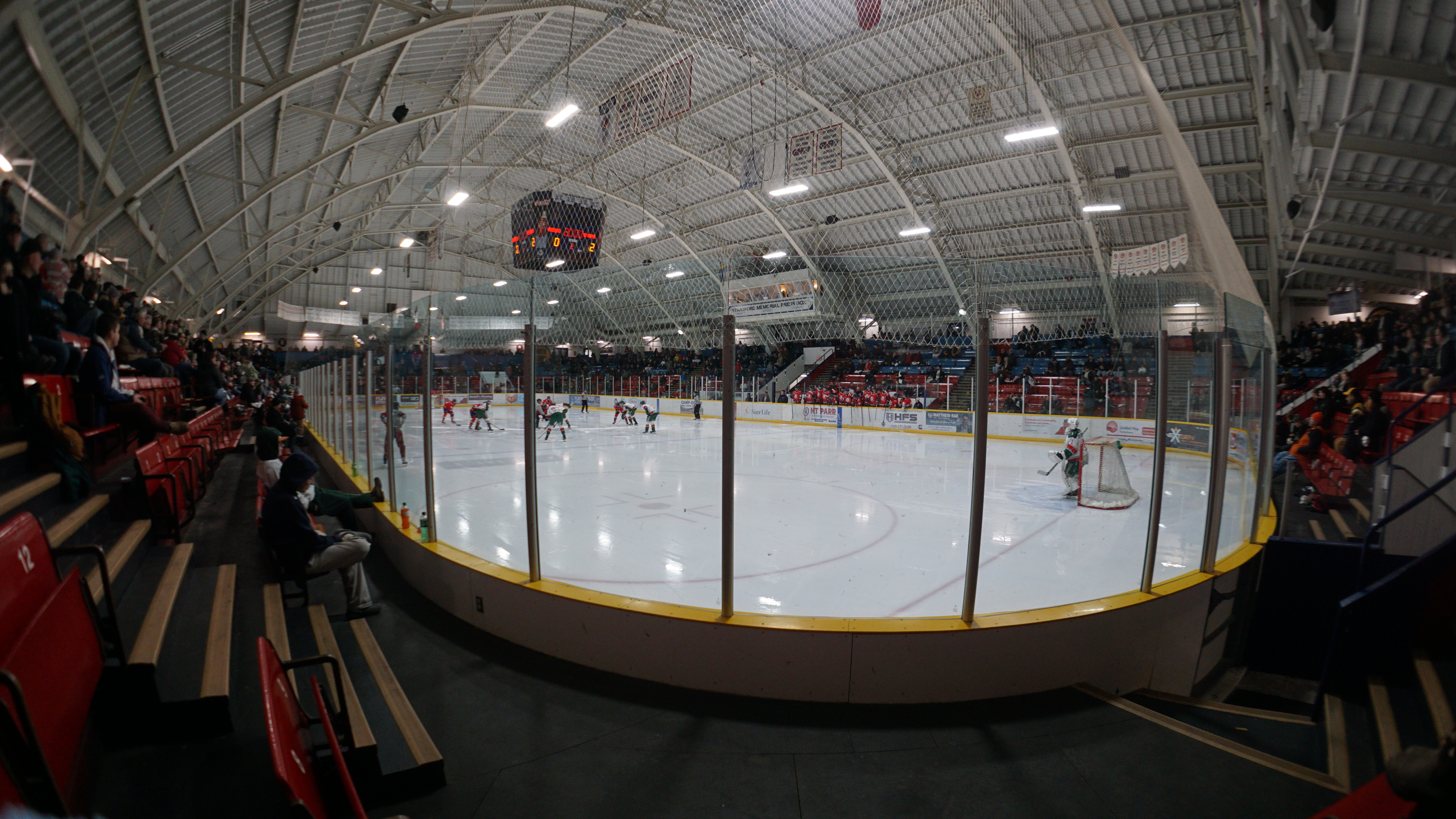
Stratford Warriors home game

Stratford is home of the OHA Midwestern Junior B hockey team, the Stratford Warriors. The Warriors have produced notable NHL players such as Ed Olczyk, Craig Hartsburg, Garth Snow, Rob Blake, Chris Pronger, Nelson Emerson, Tim Taylor, Greg de Vries, Jeff Halpern, Rem Murray and Boyd Devereaux and won several Sutherland Cup championships. Stratford hosted Tim Hortons Hockey Day in Canada on January 30, 2010. Stratford used to also have an Intercounty Baseball League Team called the Stratford Nationals, and a soccer team in the Kitchener and District Soccer League. House League sports are also available in the Stratford area. There is the Stratford Rotary Hockey League, Hoops For Fun Basketball, Stratford Minor Baseball, the Stratford Soccer House League and the Stratford Dragon Boat Club. It's the home of the Stratford Sabrecats, and Stratford is also home to the Black Swans rugby club. The Chess Federation of Canada has its administrative office in Stratford.

== Government ==
The city is governed by an elected city council, with a mayor and ten councilors, elected every four years. Sub-committees of council make recommendations to the standing committees of council that are then forwarded to city council for a final decision. The current mayor is Martin Ritsma.

=== Police ===
The city is served by the Stratford Police Service. The police board consists of two members of city council, a citizen appointed by council, and two citizens appointed by the Lieutenant Governor of Ontario. Stratford's first constable was hired in 1854. As of 2018, the Police Service has 56 sworn members and 22 civilians.

Other areas of Perth County receive services from the Ontario Provincial Police, Perth County Detachment in Sebringville with satellite offices in Listowel and Mitchell.

== Transportation ==
=== Road ===
Stratford is not on a 400-series highway, but is at the junctions of Highways 7 (Ontario St.), 8 (Huron St.), and the former 19 (Now Perth Road 119, Mornington St.).

=== Bus ===
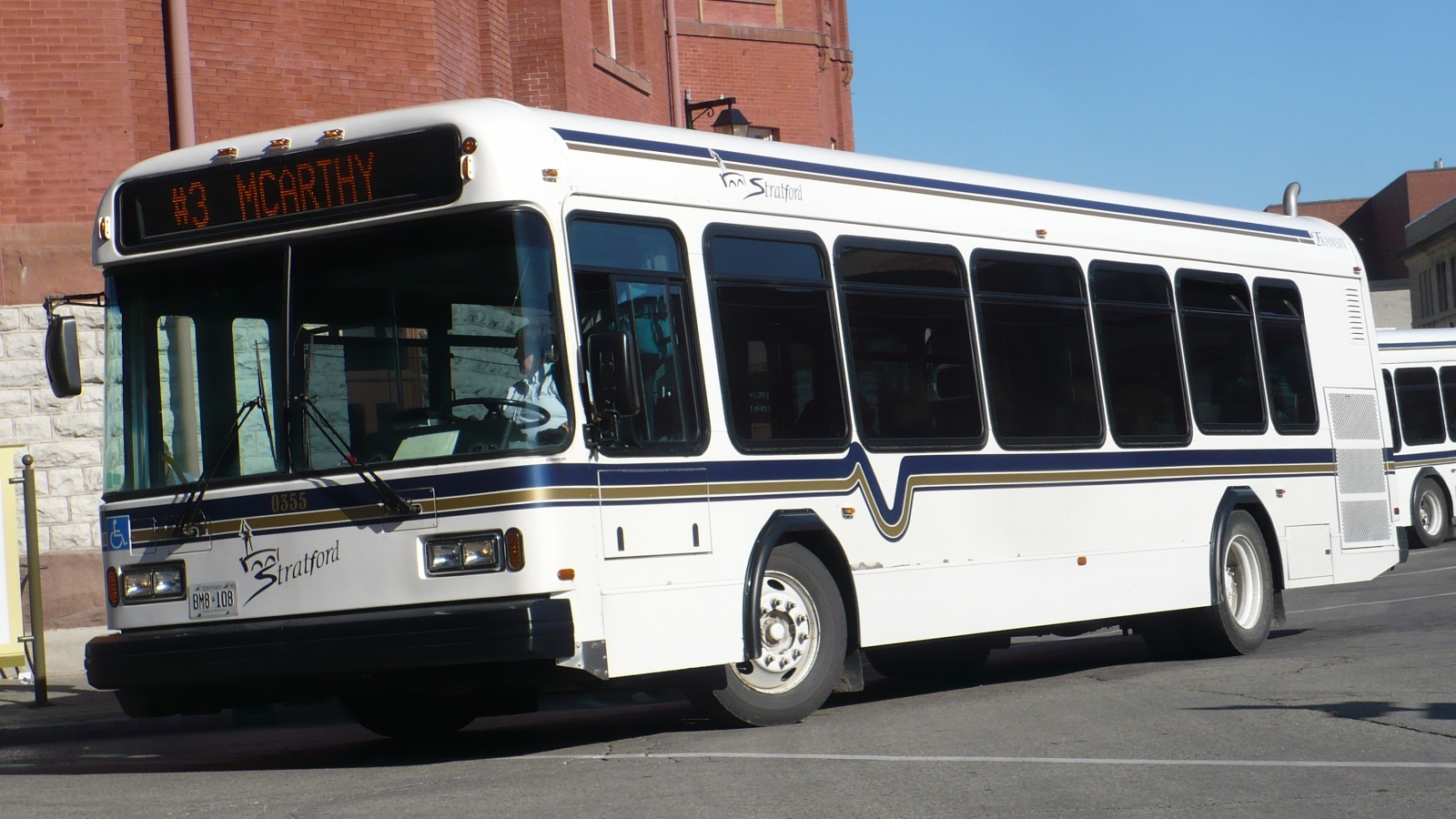
Stratford Transit bus in 2008

Within the city, Stratford Transit provides the local bus service, which runs every half-hour five days a week. On weekends, the city uses an on-demand booking system which sends a bus to a stop that the rider requests. All bus routes in Stratford begin and end at the transit terminal located on Downie Street, close to the downtown core. The terminal is home to eight bus bays and public washrooms.

FlixBus began serving Stratford as of February 2026, stopping at the Cooper bus terminal.

=== Rail ===
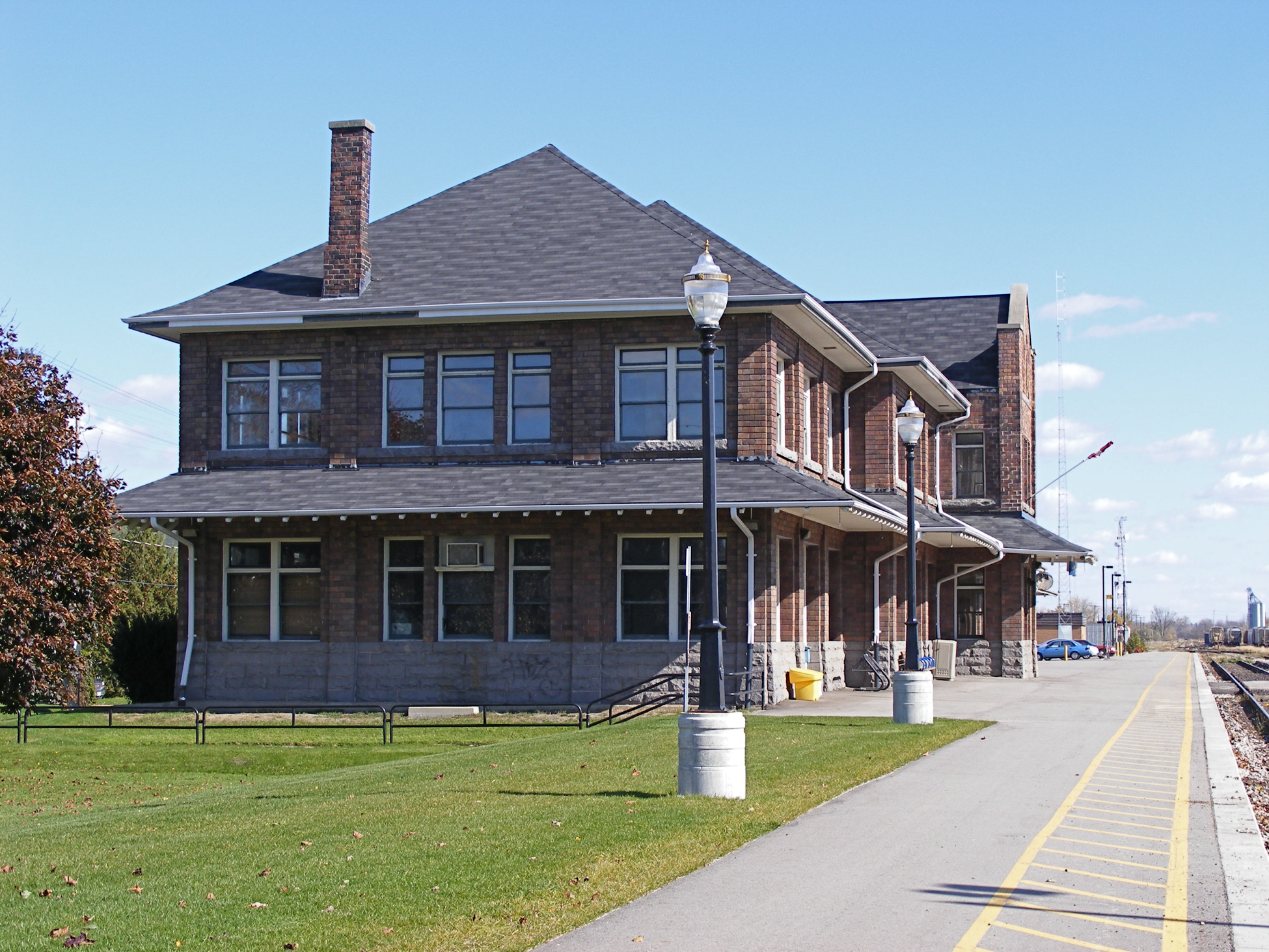
The Stratford train station in 2010

Historically, the city was a railway junction. Today, the Canadian National Railway, and the Goderich-Exeter Railway provide freight links, and Via Rail Canada is the passenger carrier. VIA's rail service in Stratford is based from the Stratford railway station, and is situated on the Toronto–Sarnia segment of the Québec City-Windsor Corridor; Via serves Stratford with two trains daily (one eastbound to Toronto Union Station, and one westbound to Sarnia via London). In April 2026, GO Transit announced they will be servicing Stratford with two trains daily on the Kitchener line, that started July 6. This effectively brings back GO service to Stratford, as there was a Toronto–London pilot project servicing Stratford which was cancelled in late 2023.

=== Air ===
The Stratford Municipal Airport (CYSA) is located just north of the city and provides only general aviation, with the closest full service airports in Waterloo (Region of Waterloo International Airport) and London (London International Airport).

== Education ==
Public education in Stratford is provided by the Avon Maitland District School Board and Huron-Perth Catholic District School Board with both boards offering education in English, as well as French immersion up to grade eight (with the public Avon Maitland board also offering both languages through high school). The city has two secondary schools: Stratford District Secondary School, and St. Michael's Catholic Secondary School.

Stratford is also home to the Stratford Chef School, a prestigious culinary school and the focus of the Food Network Canada series Chef School.

=== University of Waterloo Stratford School ===
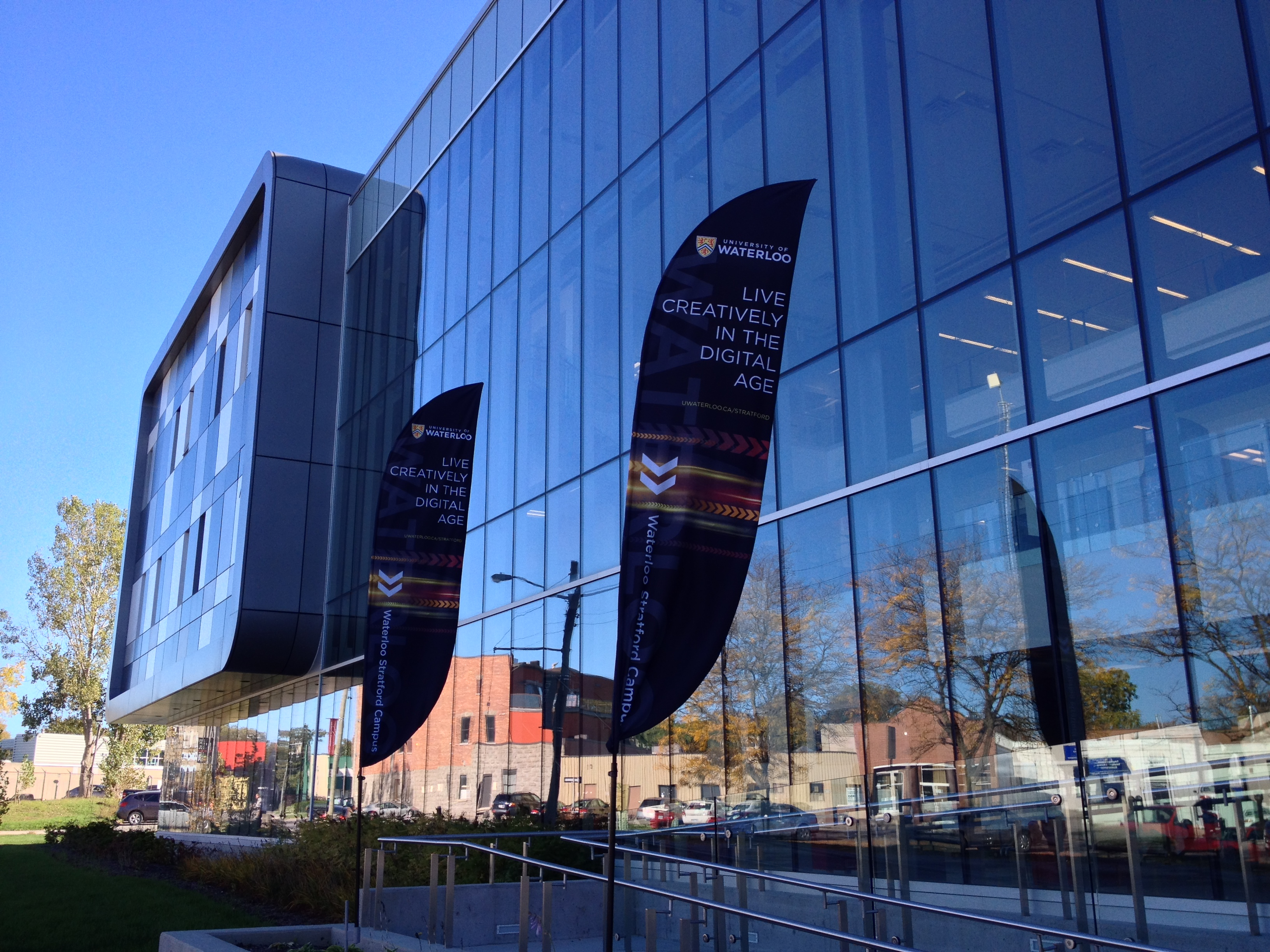
Glass building of the University of Waterloo Stratford campus

Founded in June 2009, the University of Waterloo Stratford School of Interaction Design and Business is part of the faculty of arts, established to provide programs that focus on digital media, digital technologies, content creation and user experience. September 2010 marked the official opening of the Stratford campus.

This location offers undergraduate, graduate and advanced education programs and research opportunities as well as opportunities for research and commercialization.

=== Stratford District Secondary School ===
The building was founded in 1963 under the name Stratford Northwestern. The name was changed in 2020 along with Stratford Intermediate School (formerly known as Stratford Central).

=== St. Michael Catholic Secondary School ===
Founded in 1990, St. Michael CSS is the only Catholic high school in Stratford but is one of five Catholic schools in Stratford.

== Media ==
=== Newspapers ===
- The Beacon Herald
- Stratford Times
- The Stratford Gazette - This newspaper closed in November, 2017.

=== Magazines ===
- "Stratford Living Quarterly Magazine" www.stratfordliving.ca
- "Stratford Living Seasons"

=== Radio ===
- CJCS-FM 107.1 FM
- CHGK-FM 107.7 FM

== Notable people ==
=== Actors ===
- Cynthia Dale, wife of former CBC News anchor Peter Mansbridge
- Colm Feore
- Graham Greene
- Joe Dinicol
- Shawn Roberts
- Sheila McCarthy
- Patricia Hamilton

=== Musicians ===
- Justin Bieber, pop music singer/songwriter
- Dayna Manning
- John Till
- Loreena McKennitt
- Richard Manuel
- Esthero
- Britta Johnson, composer, lyricist, and playwright
- James Westman, classical singer

=== Sports ===
- Craig Hartsburg, former NHL player and former NHL head coach
- Greg de Vries, former NHL player, resides part-time in Stratford
- Joey Hishon, former NHL player
- Nick Libett, former NHL player
- Jared McCann, currently plays for the Seattle Kraken of the NHL
- Jacob Middleton, NHL player currently with the Minnesota Wild
- Steve Miller, former NHL linesman
- Howie Morenz, former NHL player
- Rem Murray, former NHL player
- Tim Taylor, former NHL player was born in Stratford
- Rob Thomson, Major League Baseball manager with the Philadelphia Phillies
- Julia Wilkinson, Canadian Olympic swimmer

=== Other ===
- Stewart Reynolds, aka “Brittlestar”, comedian, author
- R. J. Anderson, author
- Tom Patterson, founder of the Stratford Festival. Patterson also helped found the Canadian Theatre Centre and the National Theatre School.
- Richard Monette, artistic director of the Stratford Festival of Canada from 1994 to 2007.
- David Ridgen, filmmaker, podcast host of Someone Knows Something born in Stratford
- Peter Mansbridge, journalist, former CBC chief news anchor; husband of actress Cynthia Dale
- Lloyd Robertson, former CBC and CTV chief news anchor; born and raised in Stratford
- Tony Parsons, news anchor
- William D. Connor, Lieutenant Governor of Wisconsin from 1907 to 1909
- Thomas Edison briefly worked as a telegraph operator in 1863 for the Grand Trunk Railway at Stratford's railway station at age 16
- John Davis Barnett, Assistant Mechanical Superintendent of the Grand Trunk Railroad and Mechanical Superintendent of the Midland Railway and librarian.
- Michael G. Turnbull, the assistant architect of the United States Capitol, was born in Stratford and lived there until the age of eleven, when his family emigrated to the United States.
- Norman Bethune made Stratford his temporary home in the early part of 1917.
- Robert B. Salter
- Agnes Macphail, the first woman to be elected member of the House of Commons of Canada, attended teachers college in Stratford in 1909–10.
- Jennie Kidd Trout, first woman in Canada to become a licensed medical doctor
- Basmah Hamzah, Aerobatic pilot; married to Prince Hamzah bin Al Hussein of Jordan.

== Sister cities ==
Stratford is a member of the Stratford Sister Cities program which was created to promote friendship and cultural exchange between participating countries. Participation is restricted to places called "Stratford" that have a Shakespeare Theatre or Festival. A reunion is held every second year by a different member.

The five principal sister cities of Stratford, Ontario, are:

- Stratford upon Avon, England, United Kingdom, namesake of the city
- Stratford, Victoria, Australia
- Stratford, New Zealand
- Stratford, Connecticut, United States
- Stratford, Prince Edward Island, Canada
