= Huron-Perth Catholic District School Board =

Catholic school board

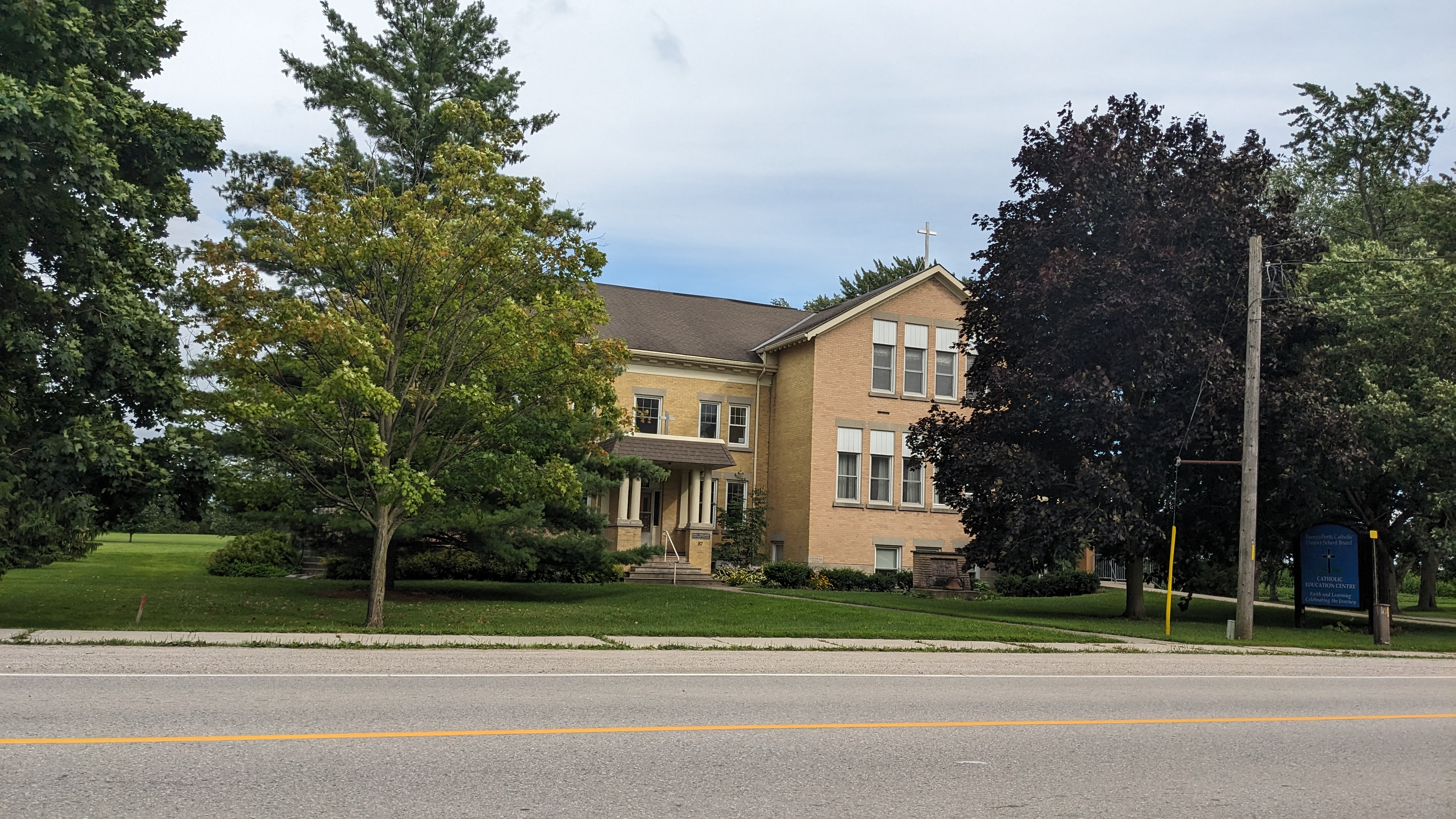
- Catholic Education Centre

Address
- 3927 Perth Rd 180 West Perth, Ontario, N0K 1E0; Canada
- Coordinates: 43.5004°N 81.28889°W

District information
- Type: School Board
- Established: 1847
- Chair of the board: Mary Helen Van Loon
- Director of education: Karen Tigani
- Schools: 18 (16 elementary, 2 secondary)
- District ID: B67016

Students and staff
- Students: 4,500 (approx.)

Other information
- Vice-Chair of the Board: Tina Doherty
- Website: Official website

The Huron-Perth Catholic District School Board (known as English-language Separate District School Board No. 36 prior to 1999) is a Catholic school board operating Catholic schools in the Huron and Perth areas of Southwestern Ontario, Canada.

The board is currently current chaired by Mary Helen Van Loon while Tina Doherty serves as the vice-chair of the board.

== List of schools ==
=== Secondary schools ===
- St. Anne's Catholic Secondary School
- St. Michael Catholic Secondary School

=== Elementary schools ===
- Jeanne Sauvé (Stratford)
- Our Lady of Mt. Carmel, Dashwood
- Precious Blood, Exeter
- Sacred Heart, Wingham
- St. Aloysius, Stratford
- St. Ambrose, Stratford
- St. Boniface, Zurich
- St. Columban, Dublin
- St. James, Seaforth
- St. Joseph's, Clinton
- St. Joseph's, Stratford
- St. Mary's, Goderich
- St. Patrick's, Dublin
- St. Patrick's, Kinkora
- Holy Name of Mary, St. Marys

== See also ==
- List of school districts in Ontario
- List of high schools in Ontario
