= 2011 Goderich tornado =

Weather event in Ontario, Canada

2011 Goderich, Ontario tornado
- The tornado approaching Goderich

Meteorological history
- Formed: August 21, 2011 4:00 PM EDT

F3 tornado
- on the Fujita scale

Overall effects
- Fatalities: 1
- Injuries: 37
- Damage: $130 million
- Areas affected: Goderich and rural Huron County, Ontario, Canada
- Part of tornado outbreaks of 2011

The 2011 Goderich, Ontario tornado was an intense F3 tornado generated by an isolated supercell which unexpectedly tore across Huron County, Ontario, Canada on the afternoon of Sunday, August 21, 2011. Beginning as a tornadic waterspout over Lake Huron, the tornado ripped through the lakeside town of Goderich severely damaging the historic downtown and homes in the surrounding area. One person died and 37 more were injured as a result. This was the strongest tornado to hit Ontario in over fifteen years, since the April 20, 1996, tornado outbreak in Williamsford, Arthur, and Violet Hill.

== Meteorological synopsis ==
There was little hint of what was to come that day as far as severe weather was concerned. Both Environment Canada in Toronto and the Storm Prediction Center in Oklahoma outlined the risk for non-severe thunderstorms that day across the lower Great Lakes. Lapse rates yielded limited instability for severe weather, with a secondary cold front acting as a trigger. Given the much colder air aloft (freezing levels near 700 hPa) coupled with surface heating there was the risk for small hail and gusty outflow winds, which was also mentioned. Though some upper-level wind field parameters were sufficient for tornadic activity, they were marginal at best when coupled with the synoptic pattern at hand (a highly atypical pattern compared to previous major tornado events in the lower Great Lakes region). Goderich is also located in the "lake shadow" of Lake Huron, which is much less likely to be hit by tornadoes than other parts of Southwestern Ontario where lake convergence fronts collide.

By 11:00 am that morning, showers and thunderstorms began to develop over southwestern Ontario. Initially they were weak, but began to intensify in some localized areas. Hail and heavy rain came down with a line of storms tracking from northwest of Kitchener toward the Brampton area early that afternoon. There were reports of localized flooding and marginally damaging wind gusts associated with these storms. A brief tornado was also reported in Gananoque at 12:45 pm. Later confirmed as an F1, this tornado caused minor damage in an area 1.5 kilometres long and 60 metres wide. Environment Canada issued a severe thunderstorm watch for most of southern Ontario as a result. The town of Goderich and surrounding areas of Huron County were included.

At around the same time, an intense thunderstorm had developed over northern Michigan in Alcona County. Hail of up to two inches in diameter was reported to the National Weather Service and a velocity couplet appeared on Doppler weather radar at around 1:30 pm. A tornado warning was subsequently issued, but the storm moved out over the relatively warm waters of Lake Huron shortly after. It weakened for a time, but began to intensify once again as it crossed the border into Canada by 3:00 pm. Strong rotation began to develop on the southwest side of this thunderstorm as resolved by velocity images on the Exeter, Ontario radar, and a textbook-style hook echo soon appeared on reflectivity images too (see image to left). With the powerful storm closing in on Goderich from the northwest at approximately 75 km/h, Environment Canada issued a tornado warning at 3:48 pm. The meteorologists estimated the storm would make landfall there in approximately ten minutes.

Later on that day after this tornado, an EF2 tornado was confirmed in western New York, near Conquest. An EF1 tornado also occurred in Grafton County, New Hampshire.

== Tornado summary ==
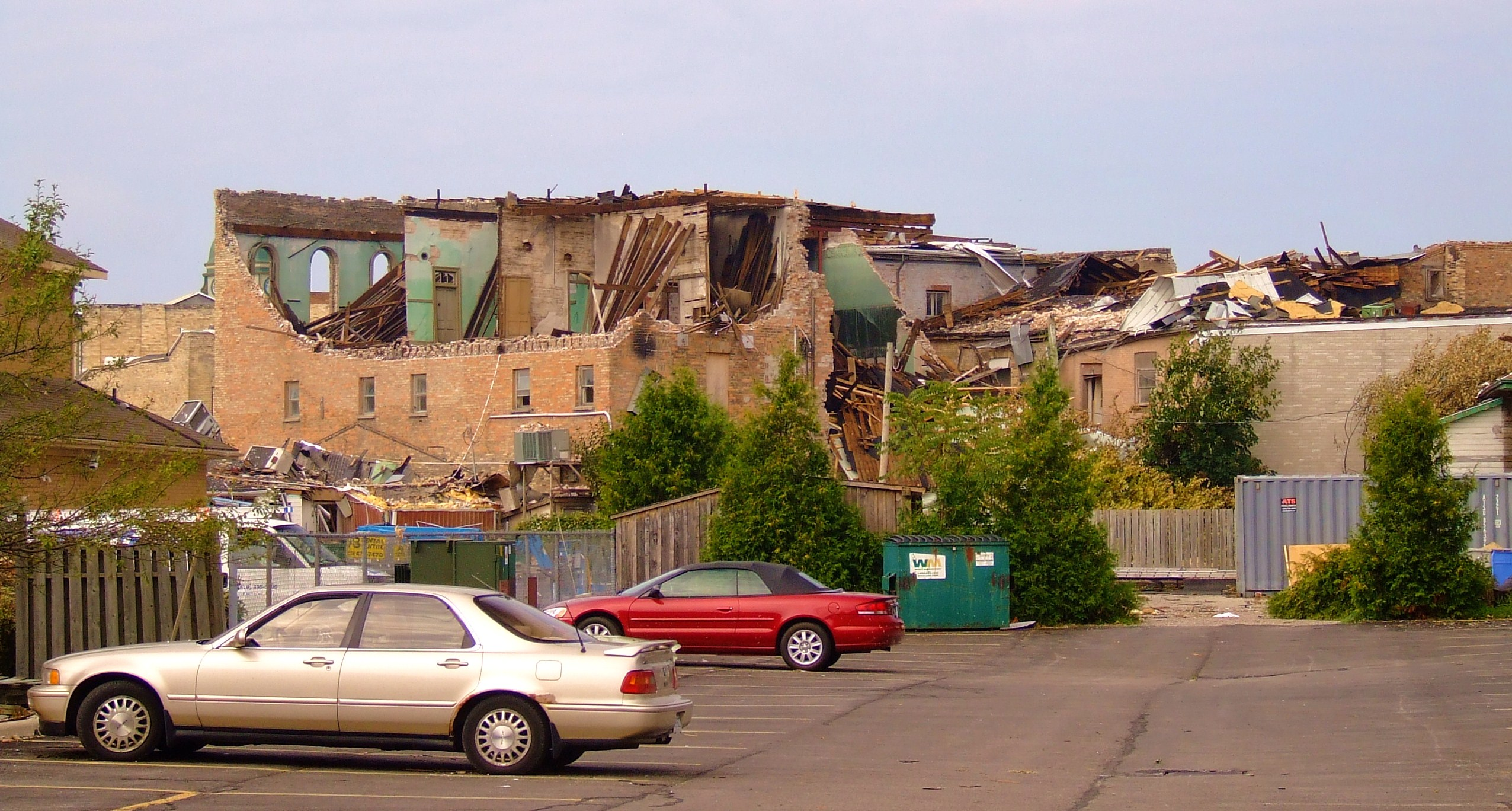
Severely damaged, historic brick buildings in downtown Goderich

In the minutes prior, the tornadic supercell was closing in on the Lake Huron shoreline. Photos and video of these initial moments reveal no funnel, merely a thick, rotating wall of rain curtains. Not unlike the Barrie tornado in 1985, this storm was also heavily rain-wrapped. At this point, the only sign of the approaching tornado was a loud roar; some witnesses falsely interpreted it to be the engine from a nearby freighter (Cooper and Cove, 2011).

Moving on to land by 3:55 pm, the tornado made its first destructive appearance at the Sifto Salt mine located on Indian Island at the mouth of the Maitland River. It tore large portions of roof from the salt storage domes and brick outbuildings at the facility. Pieces of sheet metal were also ripped from some of the higher-profile structures, such as the salt evaporator. A 61-year-old crane operator was killed when his boom collapsed. After crossing the river, the tornado tore more sheet metal from the upper portion of a nearby grain elevator before plowing up the bluff overlooking Lake Huron, in a swath several hundred metres wide.

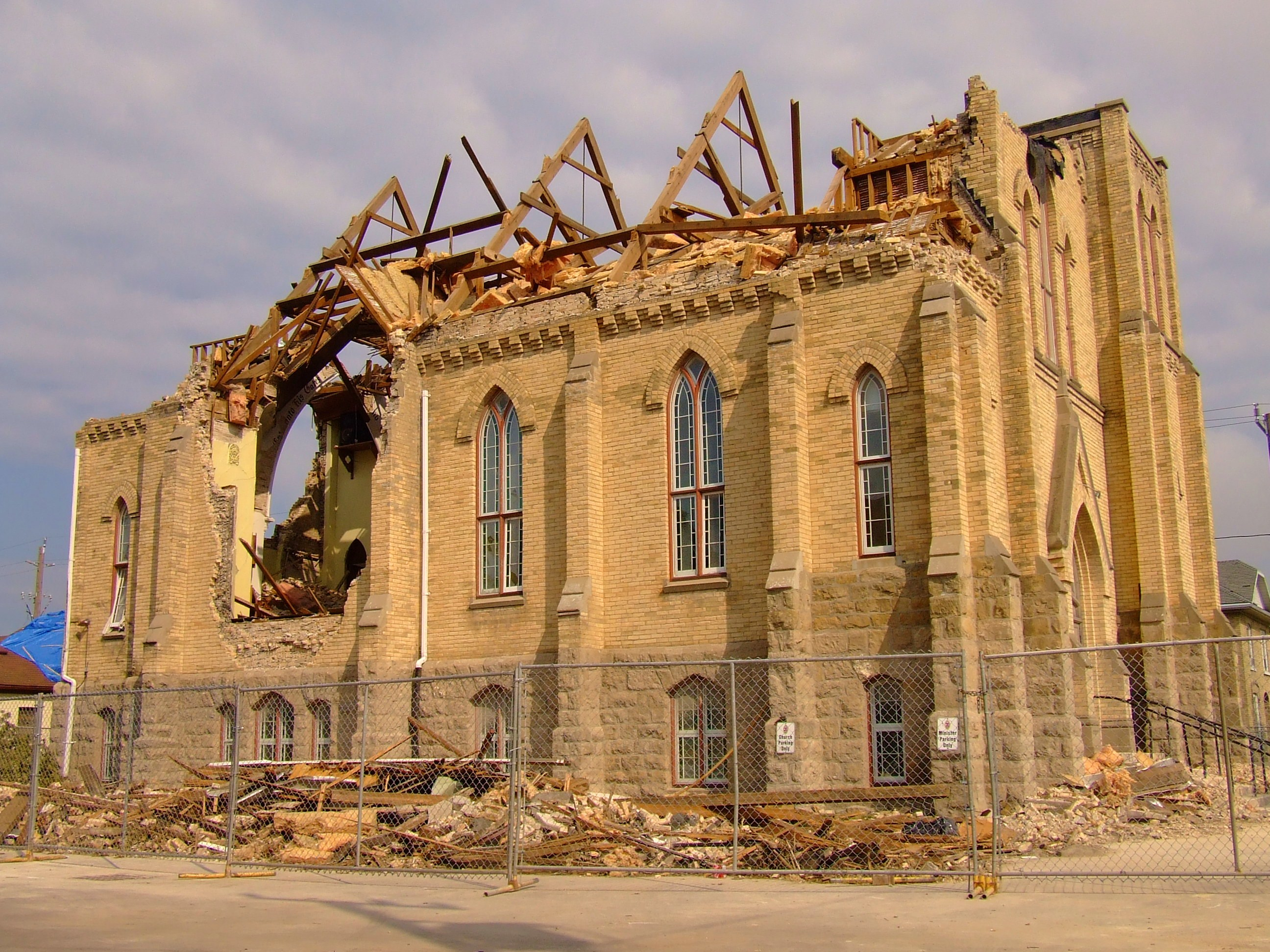
The Victoria Street United Church in Goderich following the tornado, which was later demolished

The tornado then moved into the neighbourhood immediately northwest of Goderich's downtown core. Hardest hit was the Waterloo Street and St. Georges Crescent area, which was closest to the immediate edge of the bluff. Power poles and trees were snapped or uprooted in addition to many homes either losing their roofs or sustaining further structural damage after initial roof loss. Most buildings in the historic octagonal downtown, housing century-old brick buildings, suffered blown out windows or much worse. This included the sturdy and relatively unscathed Huron County courthouse, which also suffered major interior damage (Cooper and Cove, 2011). Others were not so lucky as roofs were completely torn off, leaving little structural integrity to face the wind. The upper floors of several of these buildings were completely destroyed. The remaining loose brick and mortar fascia collapsed, crushing vehicles and other similarly sized objects. Vehicles parked in more open areas were subsequently overturned or impaled by flying debris, trees were removed of most of their limbs with sheet metal and other foreign objects wrapped around them. Immediately surrounding the downtown, a church built in 1878 (see photograph to left) at the intersection of Kings Highway 21 and St. David Street was severely damaged. A carwash facility adjacent to the church suffered a similar fate. Three people were injured at the carwash when the roof was torn off and the bays underneath became exposed to the wind. A van with two people inside had its windows smashed out when debris wrapped itself around it. Another man on a Harley-Davidson motorcycle had both his legs broken when he became pinned between his bike and a collapsed wall from one of the bays. The three had been seeking shelter from the storm at that time, mainly from the golfball to baseball size hail that preceded the tornado.

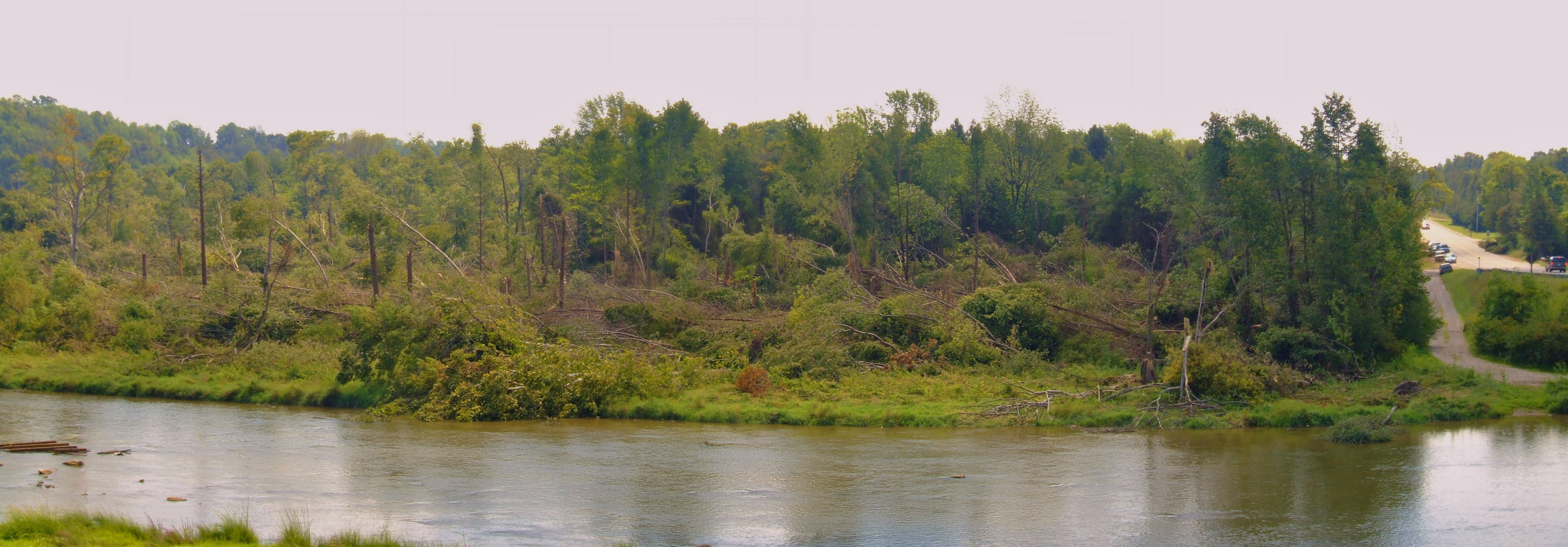
Tract of trees near the Maitland River decimated by the tornado

Crossing Kings Highway 21, the tornado moved into the easternmost residential areas of Goderich, north of Elgin Street. More homes sustained significant damage here, with most of those affected receiving some form of roof or window damage. Those with clapboard siding had pock marks and some of their paint stripped. Other homes lost vast portions of their roofs and commercial buildings near Oxford Street and Maitland Road had partial roof removal and exterior wall damage. Some of these walls partially collapsed, crushing more vehicles. Timber power poles were snapped, and concrete light posts were partially toppled near this location. Moving to the east-southeast, the tornado left Goderich, on its way toward the hamlet of Benmiller approximately 8 kilometres away. Now emerging from the rain curtains as a menacing, stovepipe-shaped funnel, and roughly following the Maitland River, the tornado's path widened. In this mostly rural area, there was extensive tree damage in a swath about 1 kilometre wide. Passing through Benmiller it caused extensive damage to several more structures, including the Benmiller Inn. Large swaths of trees were downed on both sides of the Maitland River, as well as in town. Witnesses also reported that the tornado briefly reversed the river's flow as it approached (Cooper and Cove, 2011). Structural debris from Benmiller was deposited into the river, and the damage became more erratic as the tornado crossed uneven terrain; structures on higher ground were more severely damaged.

Leaving Benmiller, the tornado entered into a more rural area once again, as it began to enter its final stages. Many tree limbs were removed by the tornado in addition to it toppling the trees themselves. The damage path also became more evident as it passed through open cornfields, downing large swaths of corn in an area about 200 metres wide. Crossing Sharpes Creek Line (Huron Road 31) there was more tree and corn damage by the tornado, though it was becoming increasingly weaker and sporadic in nature. The tornado eventually dissipated in the open fields between Base Line (Huron Road 8) and London Road (Kings Highway 4), southwest of the village of Londesborough, after some 15 to 20 kilometres on the ground.

== Aftermath ==
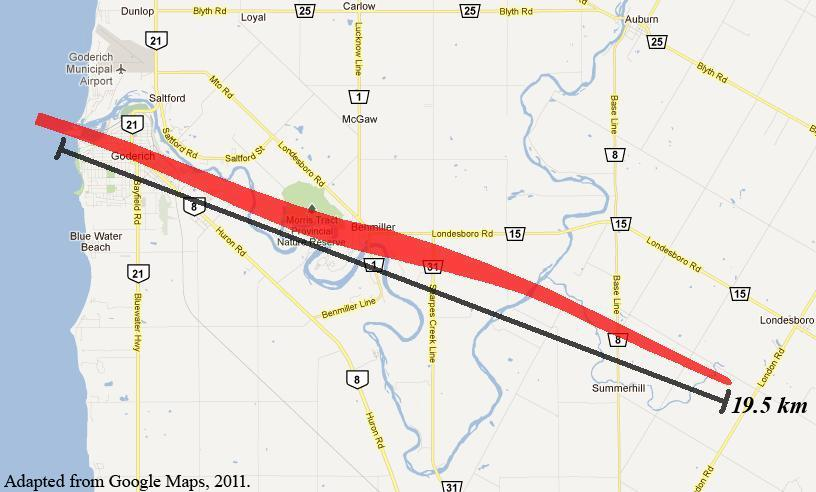
A map of the tornadoes track

Following the tornado, one person was dead and 37 more were injured along the tornado's track from Lake Huron to near Londesborough. In the hours after the disaster, the Ontario Provincial Police closed all roads leading into Goderich in order to allow streets to be cleared of debris, and to deal with the numerous gas leaks across the town of 8,000. Town officials quickly declared a state of emergency as urban search and rescue teams combed the town for missing individuals. No one was left unaccounted for in spite of the severe damage. The day after the storm, Ontario Premier Dalton McGuinty visited Huron County and pledged $5 million in disaster assistance from the province of Ontario, half of which was allotted to the town of Goderich. Local hardware stores also donated many of their products to assist in the recovery effort.

News reports later estimated that in Goderich, one hundred houses, 25 buildings and thousands of 150-plus-year-old trees were seriously damaged or destroyed.

In the days following the storm, as power was restored, roads became passable, and damaged structures shored up, local public works crews established fencing and concrete barriers around the entire perimeter of historic downtown Goderich to prevent looting and trespassing. These measures were also enforced by the Ontario Provincial Police, who barred anyone other than those contracted for cleanup efforts to stay out of the area. By the end of August, the question of restoration of many of the oldest structures in Goderich was one of major debate. The town square was finally reopened on Friday, September 9. However, several of the historic structures (including the opera house on Kingston Street, the church on Victoria Street, and a studio on Montreal Street) were all razed in October. The recovery process is ongoing, and will take many months or potentially years to fully complete, amid significant controversy regarding insurance settlements for private property owners. The Insurance Bureau of Canada estimates the tornado caused $75 million in damage, but the Mayor of Goderich estimates the total bill will top $100 million.

A city relief fund has also been set up, entitled the Goderich Disaster Relief Fund, in which anyone can make a donation at chartered banks and the Goderich Community Credit Union. Early in 2012, this latter effort is expected to match the assistance issued by the province, owing to contributions from those all over Canada and the United States. In addition, a book immortalizing the disaster, entitled Not Like Any Other Sunday, has been published and is available as of December, 2011. All proceeds go to relief efforts such as the Victim Services of Huron County and the Goderich Trees reforestation project.

In the months following the tornado disaster, Huron County officials began discussing the use of tornado sirens. The community of Clinton in the Central Huron Municipality implemented its volunteer fire department's siren to be used for severe weather, which is now one of the few Ontario communities to do so. Huron County asked for a government grant to purchase 30 tornado sirens for communities across the county, but the grant request was denied. Officials are now working on a plan to use the remaining fire department and Cold War air raid sirens for severe weather.

=== Rebuilding The Square area ===
After the tornado, a news report described The Square area as follows: "The roofs of several buildings ringing the square were torn off. The green space around the courthouse at the centre of the square was littered with tree limbs and trees that had been ripped out of the ground."

A year later, 152 of the 170 downtown businesses had reopened but reconstruction of the courthouse, some historic buildings and the trees in the area took much longer.

A visitor to the area nearly four years after the event found that the park had re-opened with a new band shell. New trees, greenery, a statue and a water feature had been installed in front of the court house. Much of the area around the park had been reconstructed including commercial building on Kingston Street and The Square. The last work to be completed was the Kingston block of commercial buildings on Kingston Street and The Square. Although the farmers' market and flea market had closed before the tornado, it re-opened again.

A postgraduate researcher from Wilfrid Laurier University visited the downtown area in May 2016 and described it as absolutely gorgeous. "The only visible signs of the tornado's aftermath were some fallen trees and debris in a cemetery."

== See also ==
- 1985 Barrie tornado - An F4 tornado that struck Barrie, Ontario becoming one of the deadliest in Canada.
- Edmonton tornado - A deadly F4 tornado that struck Edmonton, Alberta, killing 27 people in 1987.
