= North Huron Citizen =

Canadian newspaper in Ontario

- Type: Weekly newspaper
- Owner(s): North Huron Publishing
- Publisher: Deb Sholdice
- Editor: Shawn Loughlin
- Headquarters: 405 Queen St Blyth, Ontario, N0M 1H0
- Website: https://www.huroncitizen.ca/

The North Huron Citizen is a weekly newspaper covering the communities of Blyth and Brussels, Ontario, along with the townships of Huron East, North Huron, Morris-Turnberry and Central Huron. It is a community owned newspaper started in 1985, after the Brussels Post and the Blyth Standard ceased operations. In 2016, it was selected as the Best All Around newspaper with a circulation of 1,250 to 1,999 by the Canadian Community Newspaper Awards.

== History ==
The North Huron Citizen has been reporting news from Blyth, Brussels, and surrounding rural areas in Huron County, Ontario since 1985.
