= Phyllis Deakin =

British journalist with The Times

Phyllis Deakin (1899–1997) was born in Sheffield. She was the first woman journalist with The Times. During the second World War she was one of the first six British accredited women war correspondents, along with Phyllis Davies and C. W. Shepherd.

In 1943 she founded the Women's Press Club and was its first chair. She was also one of the founders of the Federation of Business and Professional Women's Club, and was secretary for ten years.
