= Brussels, Ontario =

Brussels
- Unincorporated Community
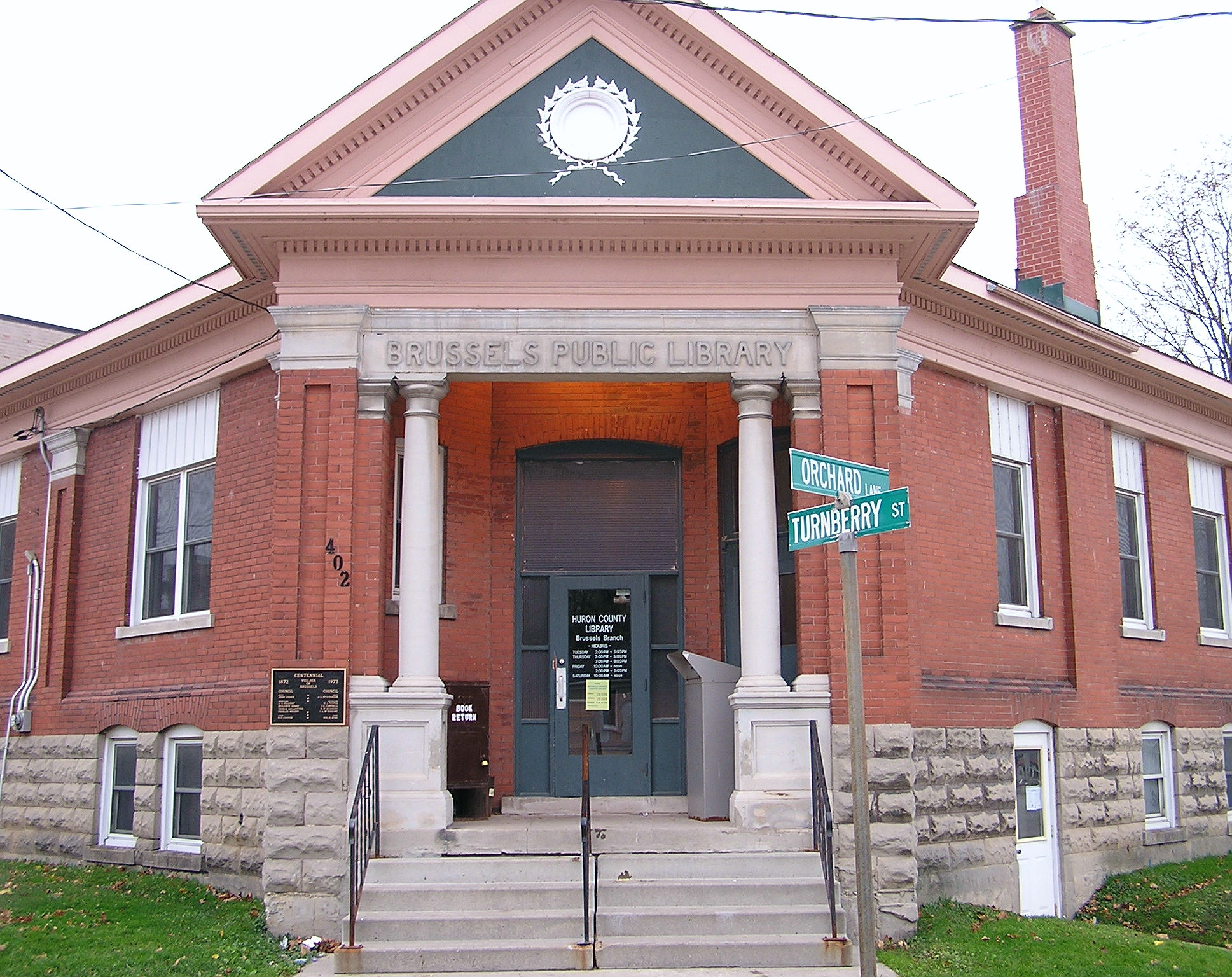
- Brussels Public Library
- Motto: Ontario's Prettiest Village
- Location within Huron County Location within Southern Ontario
- Coordinates: 43.7444°N 81.2498°W
- Country: Canada
- Province: Ontario
- Settled: 1855; 171 years ago (as Ainleyville)
- Established: December 24, 1872; 153 years ago

Government
  - Municipality: Huron East
  - Federal riding: Huron—Bruce
  - Prov. riding: Huron—Bruce

Population (2021)
  - Total: 993
  - Density: 1,142.4/km^{2} (2,959/sq mi)
- Time zone: UTC-5 (EST)
  - Summer (DST): UTC-4 (EDT)
- Forward sortation area: N0G

Brussels is a community within the Municipality of Huron East in Huron County, Ontario, Canada. It held village status prior to 2001. The most recent population estimate was 993 residents in 2021.

== History ==
Brussels was settled in 1854, when William Ainley purchased 200 acres of land alongside the Maitland River. Originally, Ainley named the settlement after himself, and it was known as Ainleyville until it was incorporated as Brussels in 1872.

The Ronald Streamer, a piece of firefight equipment, was made in Brussels.

On January 1, 2001, it was amalgamated with Grey Township, McKillop Township, Tuckersmith Township and the village of Seaforth into the Municipality of Huron East.

== Geography ==
Brussels is located in the Huron East, and lies on the municipal border with the Morris-Turnberry; both municipalities are located in Huron County.

The town is split by two Huron County roads; 12 and 16. Huron County Road 12, called Turnberry Street (in-town) and Brussels Line (out-of-town) runs north–south through the town while Huron County Road 16 runs west–east through the town with a distinct name depending on the direction. The road is named Morris Road (out-of-town) or Orchard Line (in-town) when traveling west from the town; the road is named Newry Road (out-of-town) or Queen Street (in-town) when travelling east from the town.

The Maitland River runs through the town in a south to north direction which has resulted in the construction of a dam in the community. The river and low-land areas of the dam typically floods every spring from increased rainfall and snow melt.

Brussels is 85 km (53 mi) north of London and 69 km (43 mi) west of Kitchener. It is also 39 km (24 mi) east of the closest coastal community, Goderich on the shorelines of Lake Huron.

As Brussels is a rural community, farmland surrounds the town on all sides with scattered bushes amongst the fields.

=== Climate ===
Brussels consists of a humid continental climate with four distinct seasons. The climate generally falls into the Dfb climate subtype.

== Demographics ==
In the 2021 Census of Population conducted by Statistics Canada, Brussels had a population of 993 living in 422 of its 444 total private dwellings, a change of −14.2% from its 2016 population of 1,158. With a land area of 0.87 km^{2} (0.34 sq mi), it had a population density of 1,141.4/km^{2} (2,956.2/sq mi) in 2021.

== Media ==
=== Newspapers ===
The Brussels Post was a newspaper organization formed in 1884 in the town of Brussels. The newspaper organization was in operation from 1884 through to 1929 before ceasing operations. The operations started back up in 1937 through to 1983 when The Brussels Post was discontinued. Four years after The Brussels Post ceased operations, the North Huron Citizen formed.

In the early days of The Brussels Post, the operations were weekly.

While sources claim that The Brussels Post was formed in 1885, the earliest known digitalized paper from January 2, 1885, states that it is the 26th paper or 26th week, indicating that the first paper would have been issued around July 4, 1884.

After the discontinuing of The Brussels Post in 1981, The Citizen, provided by North Huron Citizen was formed. The Citizen is the newspaper still distributed around the community as of 2022. Similar to The Brussels Post, the newspaper is issued weekly.

While the head-office for the North Huron Citizen is located in the nearby community of Blyth, Ontario, there was a small office located in the Brussels downtown core. The sub-office was closed in 2022.

== Notable people ==
- Allan Blair, professor, experimentalist
- Darwin McCutcheon, professional ice hockey player
- Elston Cardiff, politician
- Frances Beatrice Taylor, poet, journalist
- Harry Dean Ainlay, former mayor of Edmonton, Alberta
- Jack McIntyre, professional ice hockey player
- Janet Cardiff, artist

== See also ==
- Municipality of Huron East
- List of unincorporated communities in Ontario
