= McGaw, Ontario =

Ghost town in Huron County, south of Carlow, Ontario, Canada

Coordinates: 43°44′53″N 81°37′48″W

McGaw is a ghost town in the municipality of Ashfield–Colborne–Wawanosh in Huron County, south of Carlow, Ontario, Canada.

A small railway town on the outskirts of Goderich, McGaw sat on the now-defunct Guelph and Goderich Railway. Once a bustling station that saw Prohibition era bootleggers and soldiers returning from World War 1, with the advent of trucking networks the reliance on railway transportation resulted in the closure of McGaw. The station was torn down in the 1960s; cattle pens were still operating but closed before the line was abandoned. The last train operated on tracks in McGaw was in December 1988.
