= St. Augustine, Ontario =

Community in Ontario, Canada

Coordinates: 43.844°N 81.504°W

Location of St. Augustine in Ontario

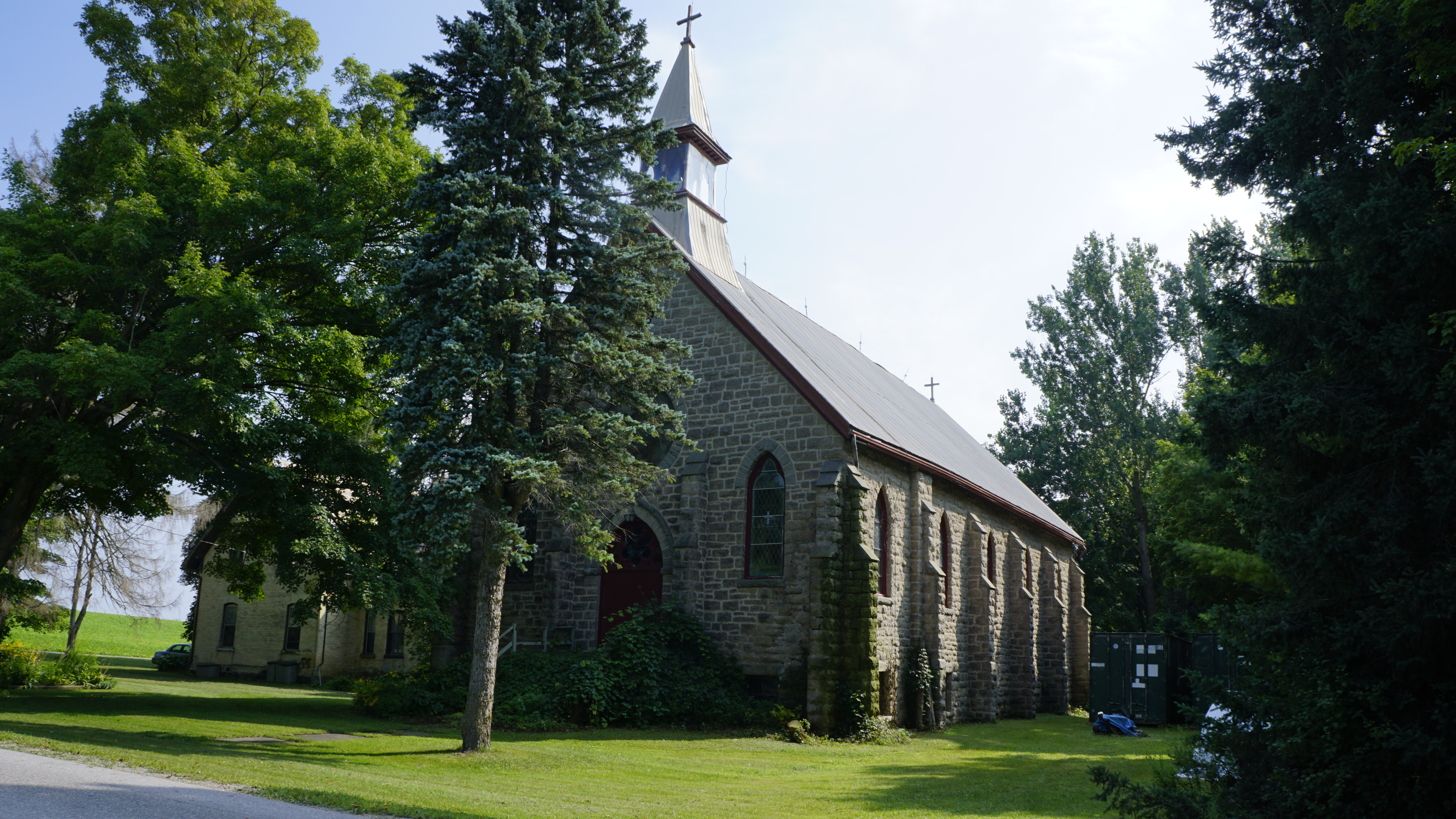
Former St. Augustine Church

St. Augustine is a community in the municipality of Ashfield-Colborne-Wawanosh, Huron County, Ontario. St. Augustine is east of Dungannon, south of St. Helens and north of Auburn.
