= Mafeking (disambiguation) =

Mafeking or Mahikeng is the capital of the North West province of South Africa.

Mafeking may also refer to:

- Mafeking, Victoria, a locality near Willaura in Australia
- Mafeking, Manitoba, an unincorporated hamlet in Canada
- Mafeking, Ontario, a former hamlet in Canada
- Mafeking, Trinidad and Tobago, a village in Trinidad and Tobago

== See also ==
- Siege of Mafeking in the Second Boer War
