= Donnybrook, Ontario =

Donnybrook
- Unincorporated rural community
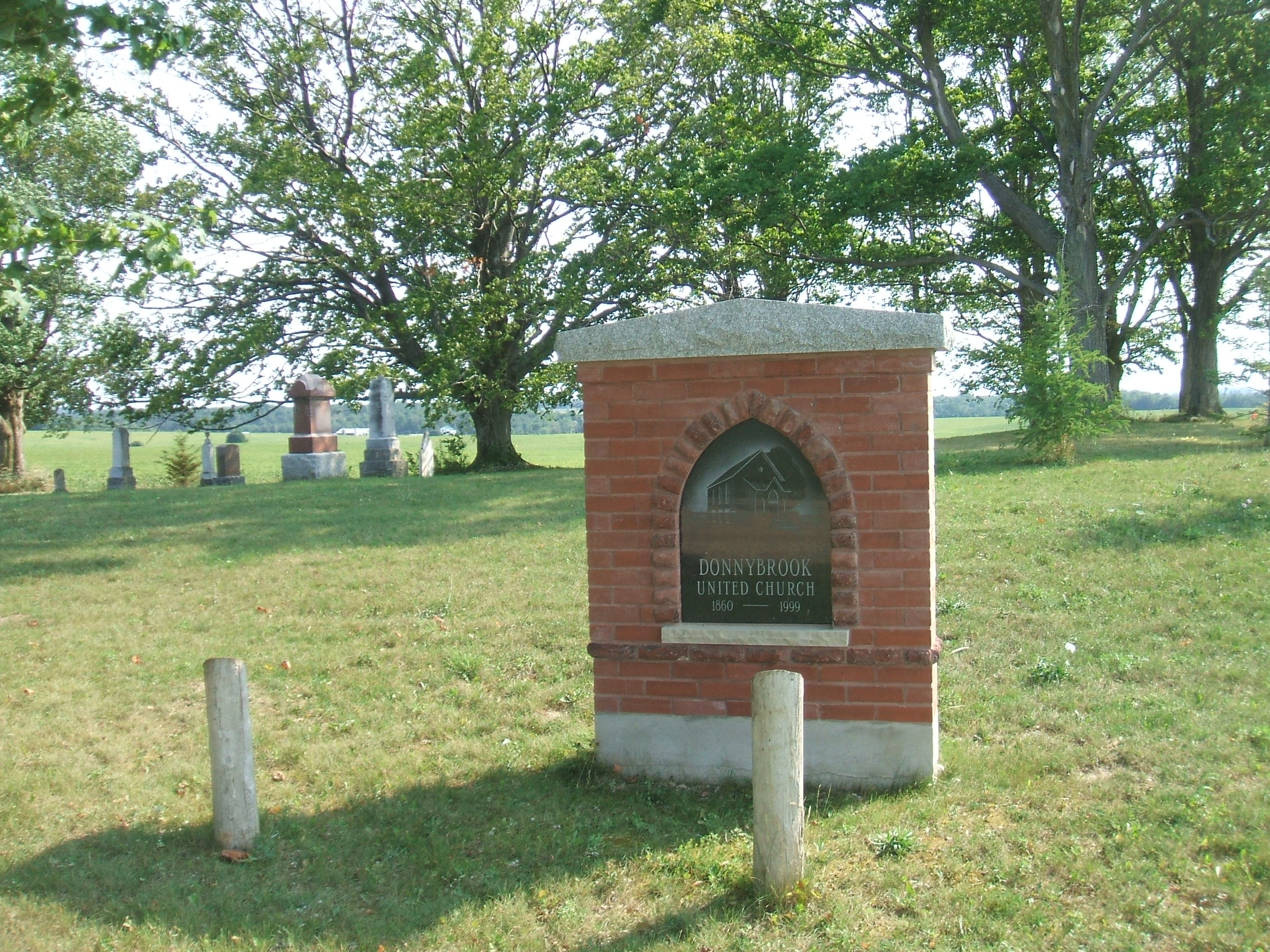
- Donnybrook Cemetery

- Location in Ontario Donnybrook (Canada)
- Coordinates: 43°50′11″N 81°28′55″W
- Country: Canada
- Province: Ontario
- County: Huron
- Township: North Huron
- Time zone: UTC-5 (Eastern (EST))
  - Summer (DST): UTC-4 (EDT)
- GNBC Code: FAZFH

Donnybrook is an unincorporated rural community in North Huron, Huron County, Ontario, Canada.

== History ==
Donnybrook was founded in the 1860s on the corner of what are now Huron County Road 22 and the Glen's Hill Road. At its peak, it had a hotel, tavern, general store, a blacksmith shop, a woodworking shop, an Orange Lodge, and a church. By the end of the 1890s, most of Donnybrook's businesses were closed. The church survived until 1999, but currently, all that remains in Donnybrook is the church's cemetery.
