= Kingsbridge, Ontario =

Coordinates: 43.9331°N 81.6998°W

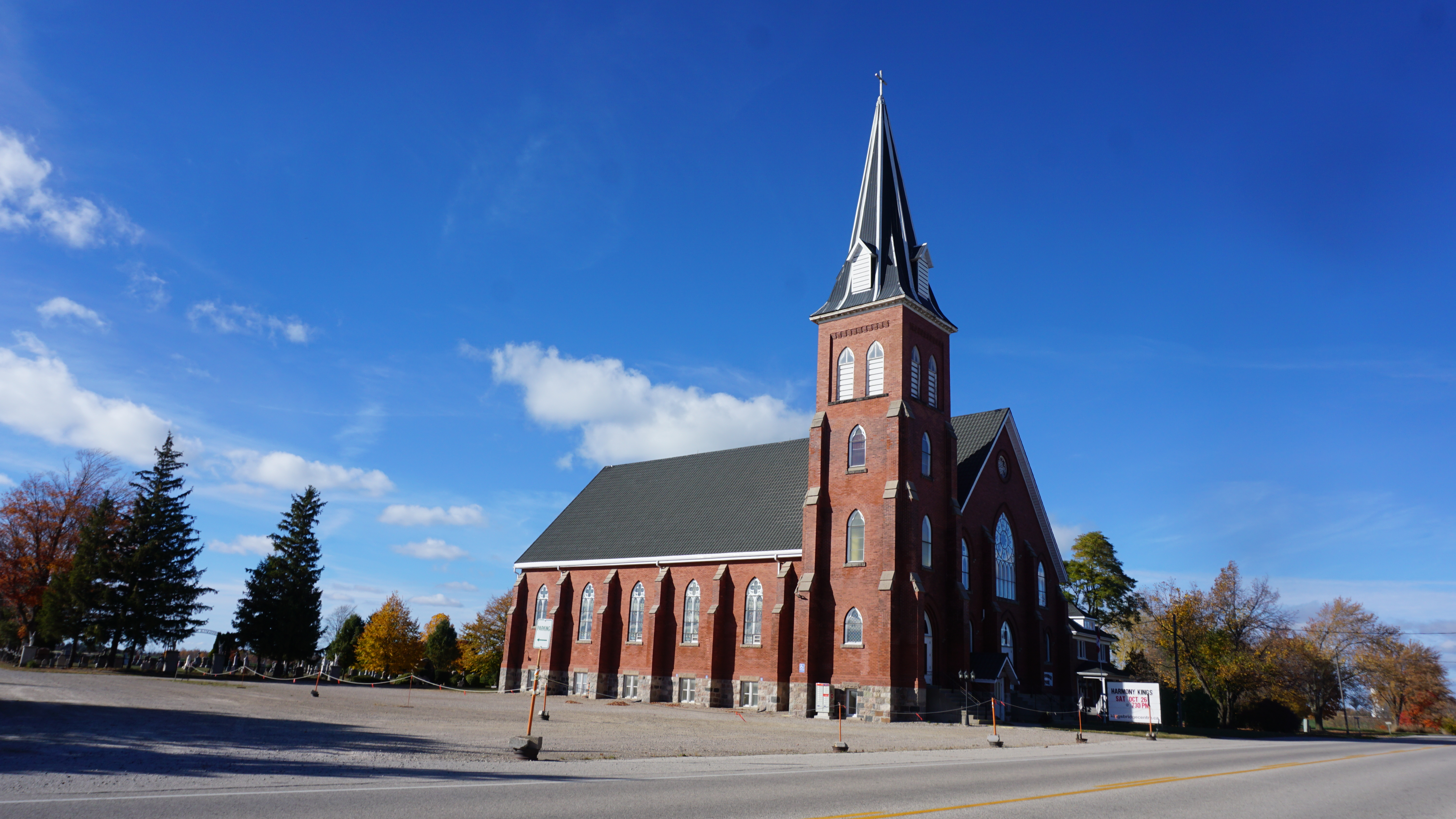
The Kingsbridge Centre on Highway 21

Kingsbridge, Ontario is a small rural community in southwestern Ontario within the municipality of Ashfield–Colborne–Wawanosh in Huron County. It is approximately 22 kilometres north of Goderich on the Bluewater Highway where it intersects with Kingsbridge Line. The area around Kingsbridge was settled in 1839 by Irish immigrants from County Kerry, Ireland. During the 1840s and 1850s many more Irish families, mostly from Kerry, although some from Counties Clare, Cork, and Tipperary, settled in the vicinity. Kingsbridge was named for John King, who constructed a bridge in the area in the 1850s. The community's primary landmarks include St. Joseph's Church, an elementary school, and the former St. Joseph's convent. The community overlooks Lake Huron and is surrounded by rich farmland.

== History ==
=== Religion ===
The first priest to visit the area was missionary Father Giveney, who baptized children and held the first mass in what is now Port Albert. Mass was said in Morgan King's cabin until the first church was erected. Father Wassereau built the first church, a white frame structure without a floor, around 1860, and it stood until the church was rebuilt in 1887. As the population in the area greatly increased, more capacity was needed, and the new church was larger and included a belfry. The current red brick church was completed in 1905, and held its first mass on October 22, a tradition that ended on October 21, 2012, when the church was closed by the London diocese due to the building being "unsafe". A group of local citizens formed a charity, the St. Joseph's Kingsbridge Community, which has effectively purchased the church and rectory, and will be using them for cultural events, in order to preserve the rich history and strong community.

=== School ===
A small Catholic school was built next to the Church, and was running for many years, but closed in June 2006 due to the low number of students. The building still stands, but is privately owned.

== Kingsbridge Wind Power Project ==
The Kingsbridge Wind Power Project is a 39.6 MW wind farm that is located in and around the area of Kingsbridge. It consists of 22 turbines and provides power for approximately 12,500 homes.
