= The Women's Press Club =

British press club for women

- Formation: 1943; 83 years ago
- Founders: Phyllis Deakin
- Defunct: 1968
- Type: Private members' club
- Headquarters: 52 Carey Street, London
- Region served: UK and the British Empire
- Members: Female journalists
- Official language: English
- Leader: Phyllis Deakin, founder

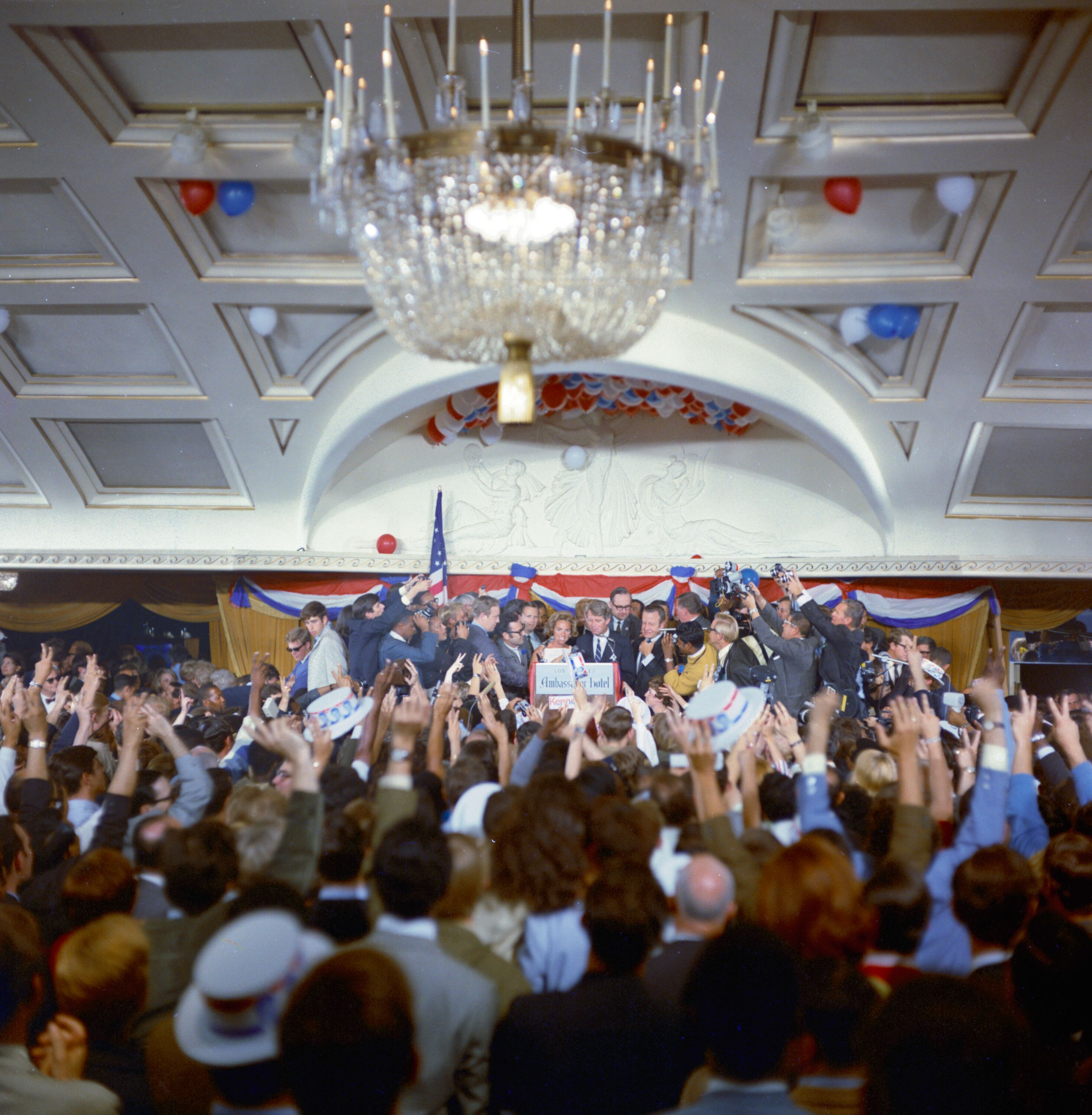
Senator Robert F. Kennedy speaking at the Ambassador Hotel on June 4, 1968

The Women's Press Club (established 1943) was created in response to the prohibition of women from the men-only London Press Club. It was founded by journalist Phyllis Deakin and ran for 25 years, when, for financial reasons, it changed its name and began to accept men into its membership. Prominent members included Phyllis Davies, Rebecca West and Marjorie Proops.

== History ==
The club's establishment was inspired by Eleanor Roosevelt's visit to England in 1943, when women on Fleet Street, with the exception of a few female magazine editors, were denied access to her. Phyllis Deakin of The Times had expressed her "annoyance with the then official male-only Press Club's refusal to admit women" and insisted that women should set up their own club, saying, "As the men won't have us, we should have a club of our own.. What about it?"

Sixty-two women attended an initial meeting at The Falstaff, Fleet Street on 1 April 1943. The club was officially founded in August of that year, for women working in journalism, either on the editorial staff of a newspaper or magazine, or as an established freelancer. There were 200 members at the club's inception. Clementine Churchill was guest of honour at the opening luncheon, this being only the second time she had met a large group of female journalists (the first being in America).

By 1944, membership had increased to 270. The club planned to move into permanent premises – which included accommodation for women from Britain and around the Empire – on Carey Street, London, but the move was delayed by several months because of "fly-bomb attacks". In 1945 a "christening party", attended by Lady Bonham Carter, Brendan Bracken and William Berry, 1st Viscount Camrose, was held to mark the official opening of the premises.

By 1950, membership had risen to 500. In 1958, Queen Elizabeth The Queen Mother, the club's president, made an "informal visit". It was reported as being "the first time a member of the Royal family has met journalists in this way." In 1967, suffering from financial issues, the club took the decision to allow men to join, and to change its name to the Writers and Press Club. Marjorie Proops of the Daily Mirror became the renamed club's first president in 1968.

== Notable activities ==
- In 1946, the Women's Press Club suggested Buckingham Palace employ a female press secretary to exclusively look after press matters for the Queen and princesses. By July 1947 the new position had been filled. In 1957, the club wrote a letter of protest to Buckingham Palace regarding the appointment of a 'non-journalist' as assistant press secretary.
- In 1959, Eleanor Roosevelt was made an honorary member of the club.
- In 1962, while visiting the USA, members of the club were invited on a tour of the White House.
- In 1964, the Prime Minister, Alec Douglas-Home attended a reception to celebrate the club's 21st birthday.

== Members ==
=== Committee members ===
- Lady Margaret Rhondda – President
- Margaret Lane, Countess of Huntingdon – President
- Julia Cairns - President
- Rebecca West – President
- Mary Grieve – President
- Josephine Ripley – President
- Alison Settle – President
- Phyllis Deakin – Chair
- Evelyn Drury – Chair
- Georgina Coleridge (Homes and Gardens) – Chair
- Nancy Martin – Chair
- Diana Sherwin – Chair
- Hilda Grosvenor – Secretary

=== Other members ===
- Anne Bolt
- M Lovell Burgess
- Jean Cleland (Woman's Journal)
- Ida Cole
- Margaret Connor
- Wendy Cooper (Birmingham Post)
- Anne Robertson Coupar
- Phyllis Davies (Daily Mail)
- Eileen Elias
- Dorothy Giles
- Suzanne Harrison (Evening Mail)
- H Grosvenor Hill (Provincial Newspapers)
- Rose Marie Hodgson (The Daily Telegraph)
- Alice Hope (Northampton Chronicle & Echo)
- Barbara Hosking (Government press officer)
- Anne Lansdell
- Hilda Marchant (Daily Mirror)
- Janet March-Penney
- Joan Marston (Chester Observer)
- Anne Matheson (Australian Consolidated Press)
- Helen McKie
- Mary Munton (Daily Telegraph)
- Marjorie Proops (Daily Mirror)
- Elizabeth Rowley (Daily Mirror)
- Muriel Segal
- Mary Stott
- Frances Beatrice Taylor
- Anne Temple
- Jennetta Vise
- Penelope Wallace
- Audrey Withers (Vogue)
