= Jean Cleland =

English editor and mayoress

- Cleland from a 1924 newspaper
- Born: Margaret Jean Butt; 9 October 1895; Hendon, Middlesex, UK
- Died: 28 June 1978 (aged 82); Grantham, Lincolnshire, UK
- Occupations: Editor, author, mayoress
- Spouse: Kenneth Andrew Cleland (m. 1924)
- Children: 1

Jean Cleland (9 October 1895 – 31 June 1978) was beauty editor of the British magazine Woman's Journal. In the 1930s and 1940s she was considered a "famous beauty specialist" and "England's foremost beauty authority." She appeared as an expert on BBC Radio's Woman's Hour from its inception in 1946 until 1949. In 1940 she was mayoress of Brentford and Chiswick.

== Personal life ==
Cleland was the only child of father Edgar Ernest Butt and mother Margaret Anne Butt née Pearce. She married Kenneth Andrew Cleland (1893–1962), a councillor and alderman, in Surrey on 22 March 1924. They had one son, born in 1926. Cleland was presented at court in 1936. She became mayoress of Brentford and Chiswick in 1940, when her husband assumed the office of mayor.

During WWII, Cleland was a centre organiser for Chiswick's Women's Voluntary Services. After the war she became vice-president of Aston Clinton, Buckland and Drayton Beauchamp Conservative Association. She was living in London when she died of natural causes, aged 84.

== Career ==
Cleland "travelled widely" and learned about many beauty cultures. In 1934 she wrote of her "prolonged study of beauty culture and much probing behind the scenes of famous beauty parlours." In 1946 Cleland published Be Beautiful: A complete Guide to Beauty for Women of all Ages. It was published in the UK by Buland and in Australia by Australian Women's Weekly. When Woman's Hour was first commissioned for BBC Radio, Cleland was suggested by producer Peggy Barker as one of the "experts on whom we can draw for information." Cleland appeared on the show between 1946 and 1949, discussing topics such as "making the best of your good points" (April 1947), "guarding your skin against the sun" (June 1947) and "how to look attractive in glasses" (October 1947). She was beauty editor for the Woman's Journal, but also wrote for the Evening Standard, Tatler, The Hongkong Telegraph, Hong Kong Sunday Herald, Hong Kong Daily Press, Woman's Pictorial and the Daily Express. She was a member of The Women's Press Club.
