= Huron County, Ontario =

Huron County
- County (upper-tier)
- County of Huron
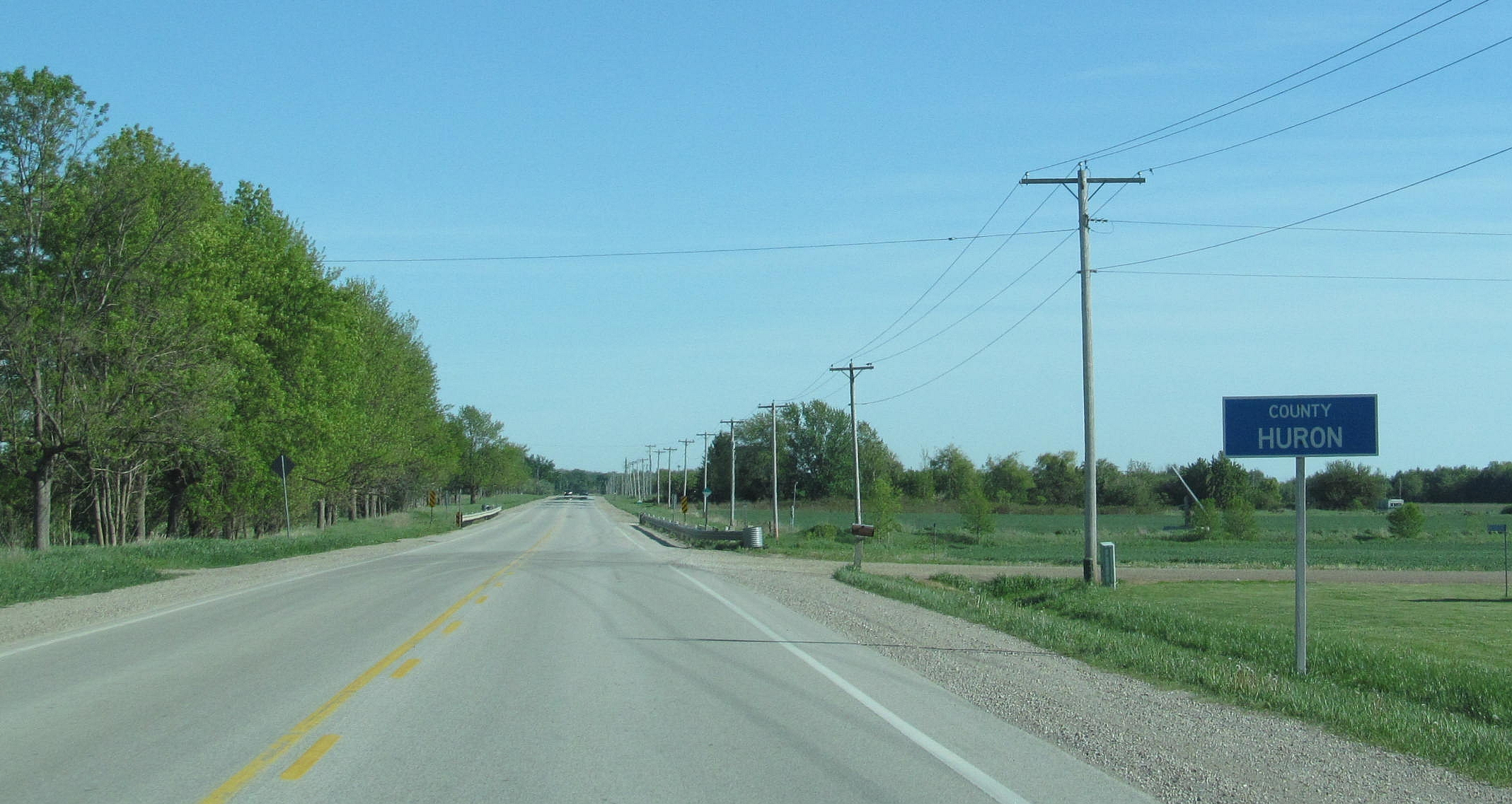
- Entering Huron County on Highway 21

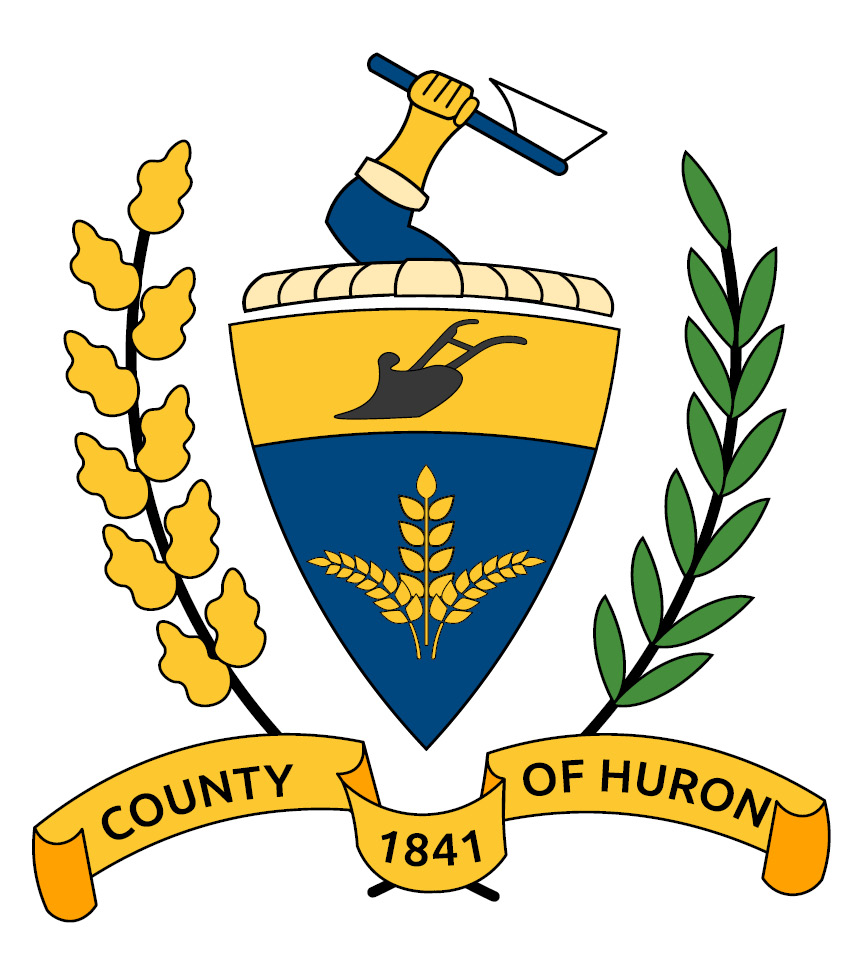
- Coat of arms

- Huron County's location in relation to Ontario
- Coordinates: 43°40′N 81°24′W
- Country: Canada
- Province: Ontario
- County seat: Goderich
- Municipalities: List: Ashfield–Colborne–Wawanosh; Bluewater; Central Huron; Goderich; Howick; Huron East; Morris-Turnberry; North Huron; South Huron

Area
  - Land: 3,398.28 km^{2} (1,312.08 sq mi)

Population (2021)
  - Total: 61,366
  - Density: 18.1/km^{2} (47/sq mi)
- Time zone: UTC-5 (EST)
  - Summer (DST): UTC-4 (EDT)
- Postal code span: N0G, N0M, N7A
- Website: www.huroncounty.ca

Huron County (/ˈhjʊərɒn, -ən/ HURE-on, -ən) is a county in the Canadian province of Ontario. It is located on the southeast shore of its namesake, Lake Huron, in the southwest part of the province. The county seat is Goderich, also the county's largest community.

The population reported in the 2021 Census for this predominantly agricultural area with many villages and small towns was 61,366 in a land area of 3,398 square kilometres. Of the total population, 7,881 reside in Goderich.

== History ==
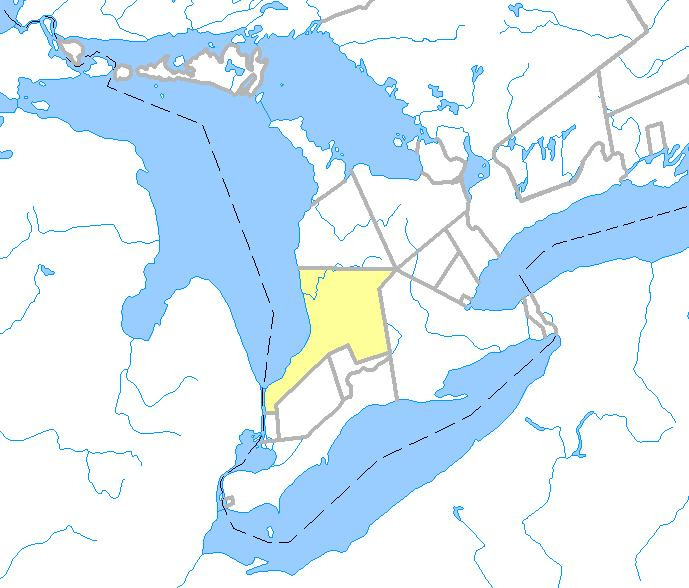
Original extent of the Huron Tract.

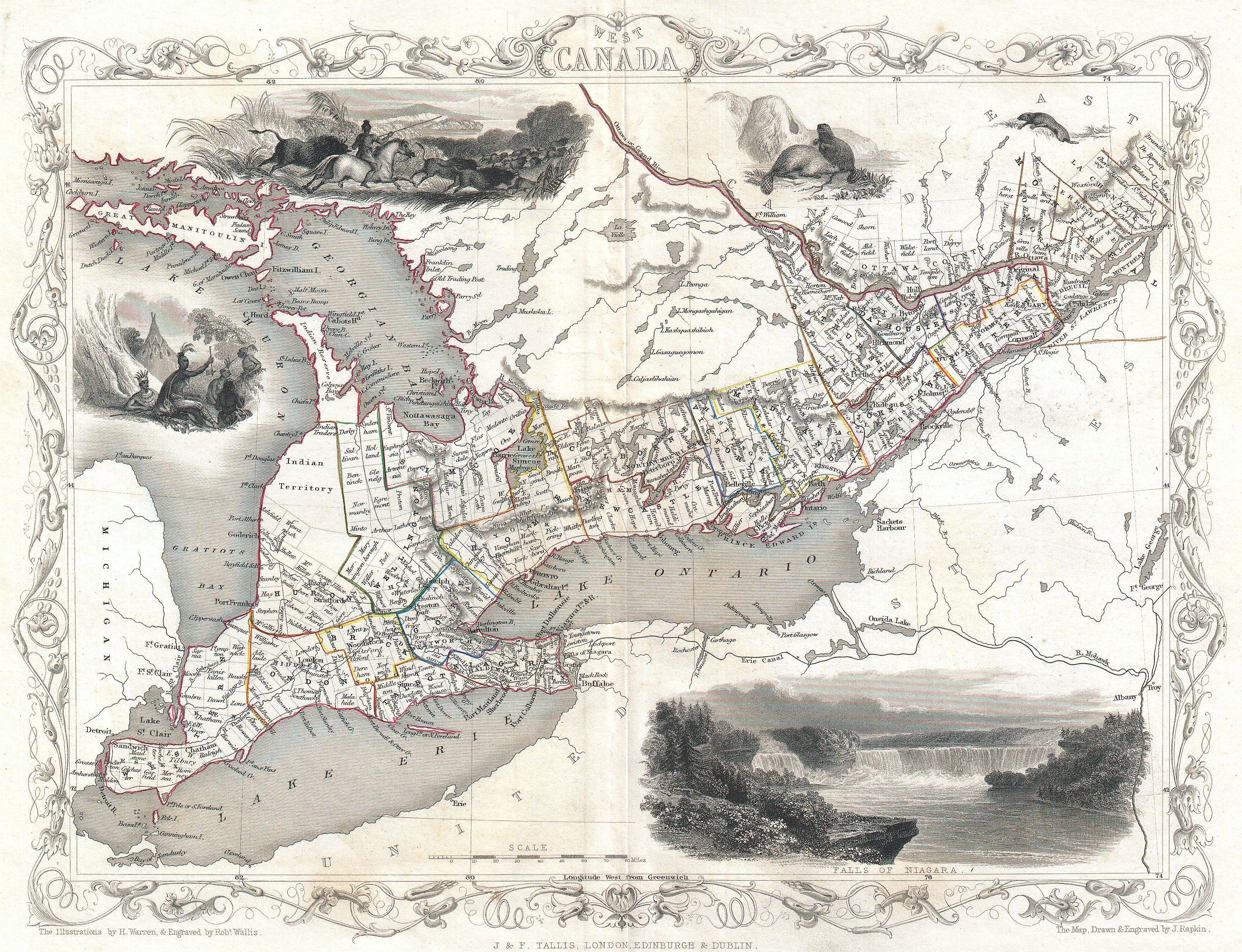
Map of Canada West in 1850, with the Huron District outlined in brown.

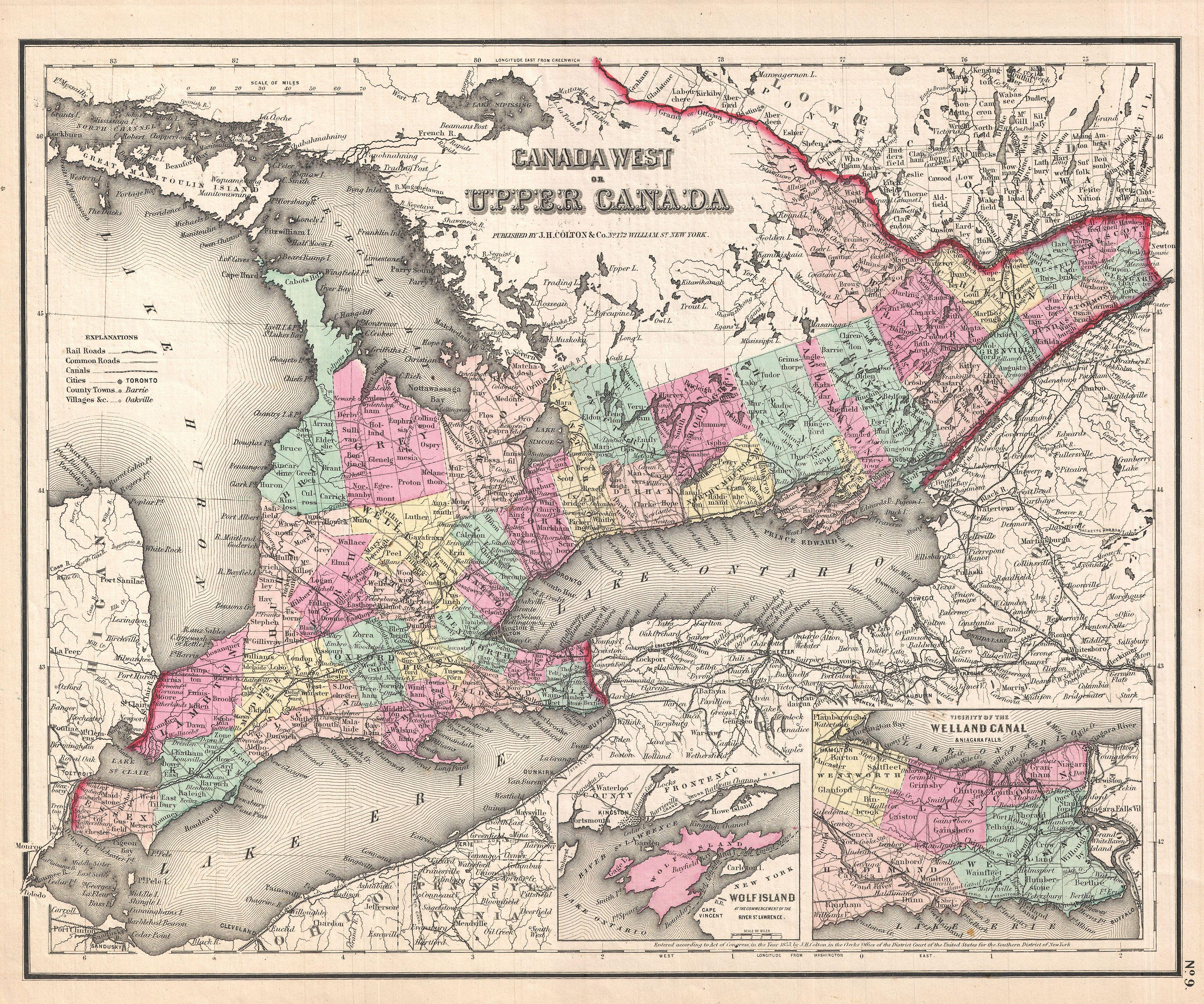
Canada West in 1857. Huron County is marked in light pink.

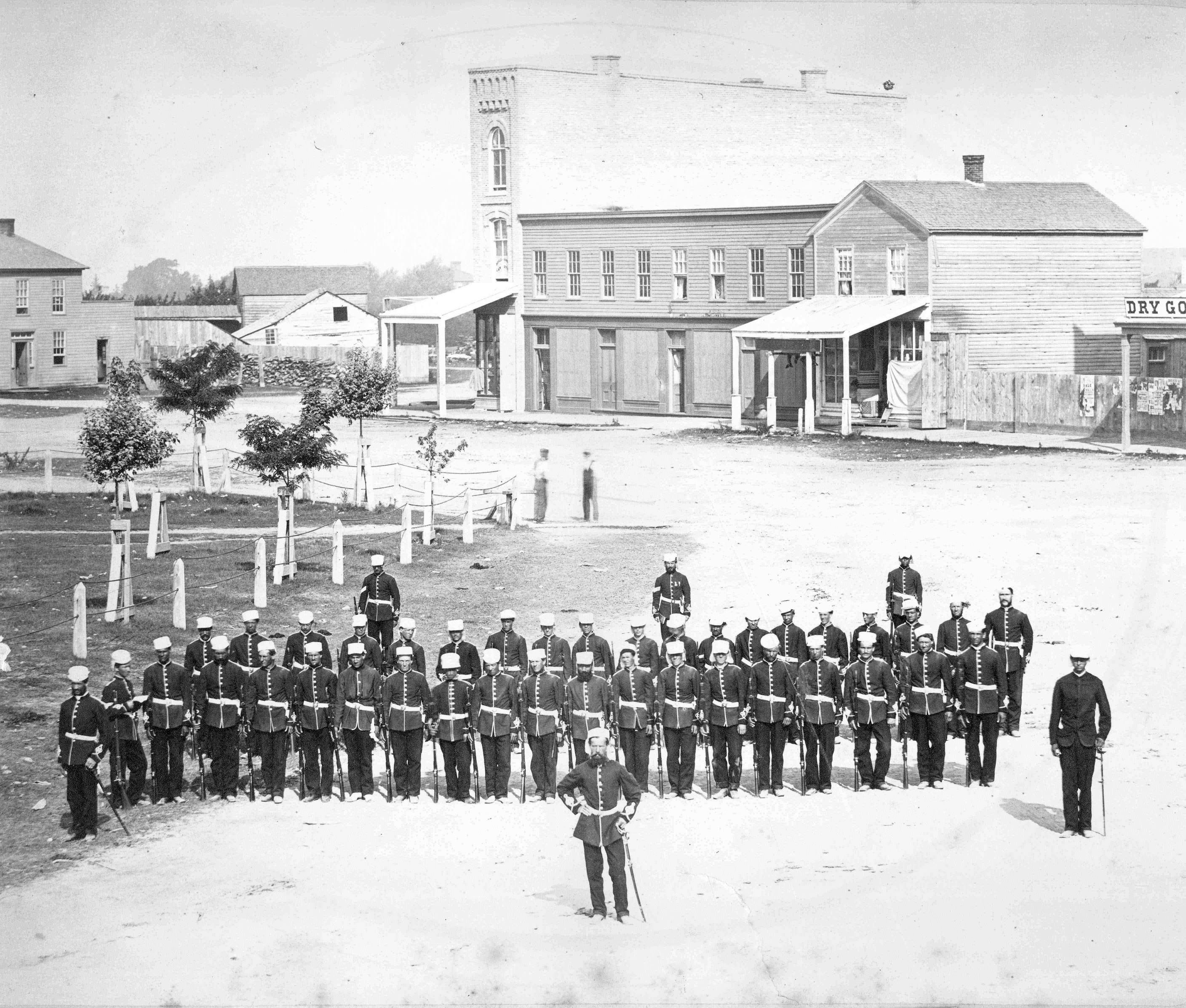
Huron County Militia in Goderich, 1866

The portion of the Huron Tract ceded to the Canada Company was established as the "County of Huron" in 1835, except certain townships that were transferred to other counties:

- Adelaide Township went to Middlesex County
- The townships of Moore and Sarnia, Plympton, Enniskillen, Warwick, Brooke and Bosanquet went to Kent County

=== Historic townships ===
In 1835, the county was declared to consist of the following townships:

- Biddulph
- Blanshard
- Colborne
- Downie
- Ellice
- South Easthope
- North Easthope
- Fullarton
- Goderich
- Hay
- Hibbert
- Hullett
- Logan
- McKillop
- McGillivray
- Stephen
- Stanley
- Tuckersmith
- Usborne
- Williams

They have since devolved to the following counties (as outlined in red):

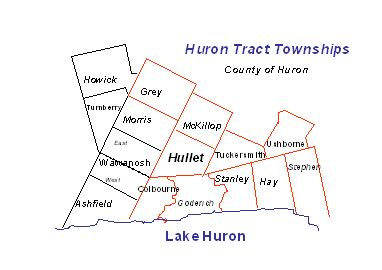
Huron County

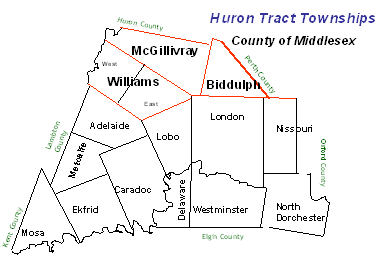
Middlesex County

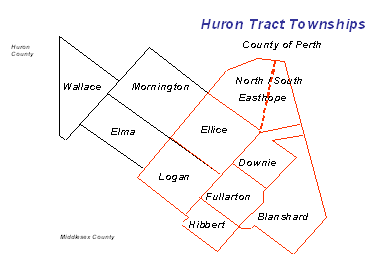
Perth County

=== Territorial evolution ===
Legislation was passed by the Legislative Assembly of Upper Canada in 1838 to authorize the separation of the county from the London District and constitute it as the Huron District. The county was extended northward in 1840, upon the survey of a new range of townships on its northern boundary, beginning with Ashfield Township, and later including Wawanosh, Morris, Grey and Elma. The District itself came into being in October 1841.

Huron County was continued for electoral purposes in 1845, and the District was extended northwards as far as the Bruce Peninsula in 1846.

The District (which existed for judicial and municipal purposes) was abolished at the beginning of 1850. Legislation passed later in the same session of the Legislative Assembly of the Province of Canada provided for the county to be reconstituted as the United Counties of Huron, Perth and Bruce, with the territory of the Bruce Peninsula withdrawn and annexed to Waterloo County. The townships were distributed as follows:

Distribution of the townships of the United Counties of Huron, Perth and Bruce (1850)
From	Perth County	Bruce County	Huron County
Huron County	Blanchard; Hibbert; Fullarton; Logan; Downie (including the Gore of Downie); Ellice; Easthope North; Easthope South (including the Town of Stratford); Elma; Wallace	Huron; Kinloss; Curloss; Carrick; Kincardine; Greenock; Brant; Bruce; Saugeen; Elderslie; Arran	the remaining townships of Huron County
Waterloo County	Mornington		

The Bruce Peninsula was later returned to Bruce in 1851. The County of Perth was given its own Provisional Municipal Council at that time, and was separated from the United Counties in 1853.

Several townships were transferred to Middlesex County:

- Williams, in 1845
- Biddulph and McGillivray, in 1862.

Legislation was passed in 1866 to provide for the dissolution of the United Counties on January 1, 1867, with Huron and Bruce County becoming separate counties for all purposes.

== Government ==
The Huron County Council consists of fifteen members from the nine area municipalities, ensuring that each of which is represented on this council. Each year, a Warden is elected from the group; this individual chairs meetings and represents the County at various functions. Elected to Ashfeild-Colborne-Wawanosh Council in 2014 and acclaimed as Mayor in 2018, the current Warden is Glen McNeil.

Most of the population of the county resides in the Huron—Bruce, formerly Huron and Huron—Middlesex, federal electoral district. The majority also reside in the Huron—Bruce (provincial electoral district), formerly known as Huron and Huron—Middlesex.

The county's Official Plan (2015) addresses the following issues: "agriculture, community services, the economy, natural environment, extractive resources, and settlement patterns." According to this document, agriculture is a particularly significant part of the economy since "Huron leads all counties and regions in Ontario in total value of production; and it also exceeds the production totals of several provinces".

=== Municipalities ===
Huron County comprises nine lower-tier municipalities (in order of population):

Municipalities of Huron County
Municipality	Population (2021)	Population Centres
Municipality of South Huron	10,063	Exeter
Municipality of Huron East	9,512	Seaforth, Brussels
Town of Goderich	7,881	Goderich
Municipality of Central Huron	7,779	Clinton
Municipality of Bluewater	7,540	Bayfield, Hensall
Township of Ashfield–Colborne–Wawanosh	5,884	
Township of North Huron	5,052	Wingham, Blyth
Municipality of Howick	4,045	
Municipality of Morris-Turnberry	3,590	

The boundaries of the county's municipalities have been in effect since 2001, after the provincial government imposed mergers throughout the province.

== Demographics ==
As a census division in the 2021 Census of Population conducted by Statistics Canada, Huron County had a population of 61,366 living in 25,334 of its 29,455 total private dwellings, a change of 3.5% from its 2016 population of 59,297. With a land area of 3,398.28 km^{2} (1,312.08 sq mi), it had a population density of 18.1/km^{2} (46.8/sq mi) in 2021.

Canada census – Huron community profile

	2021	2016	2011
Population	61,366 (+3.5% from 2016)	59,297 (0.3% from 2011)	59,100 (-0.4% from 2006)
Land area	3,398.28 km^{2} (1,312.08 sq mi)	3,399.27 km^{2} (1,312.47 sq mi)	3,399.63 km^{2} (1,312.60 sq mi)
Population density	18.1/km^{2} (47/sq mi)	17.4/km^{2} (45/sq mi)	17.4/km^{2} (45/sq mi)
Median age	46.8 (M: 45.6, F: 48.4)	46.3 (M: 45.3, F: 47.4)	45.1 (M: 44, F: 46)
Private dwellings	29,455 (total) 25,334 (occupied)	28,369 (total) 24,194 (occupied)	28,049 (total)
Median household income	$78,500	$65,944

References: 2021 2016 2011

Historical census populations – Huron County, Ontario

Year	Pop.	±%
1921	47,088	—
1931	45,180	−4.1%
1941	43,742	−3.2%
1951	49,280	+12.7%
1956	51,728	+5.0%
1961	53,805	+4.0%

Year	Pop.	±%
1966	54,446	+1.2%
1971	52,951	−2.7%
1976	56,007	+5.8%
1981	56,127	+0.2%
1986	55,996	−0.2%
1991	59,065	+5.5%

Year	Pop.	±%
1996	60,220	+2.0%
2001	59,701	−0.9%
2006	59,325	−0.6%
2011	59,100	−0.4%
2016	59,297	+0.3%
2021	61,366	+3.5%

Population counts are not adjusted for boundary changes.
Source: Statistics Canada

== Communities ==
- Amberley (border with Bruce County)
- Auburn
- Bayfield
- Belgrave
- Belmore (border with Bruce County)
- Benmiller
- Bluevale
- Blyth
- Brucefield
- Brussels
- Carlow
- Centralia (border with Middlesex County)
- Clinton
- Corbett (border with Middlesex County)
- Crediton
- Dashwood
- Drysdale
- Dungannon
- Egmondville
- Ethel
- Exeter
- Fordwich
- Goderich
- Gorrie
- Harpurhey
- Hensall
- Holmesville
- Huron Park
- Kinburn
- Kingsbridge
- Kintail
- Kippen
- Kirkton (border with Perth County)
- Lakelet
- Leadbury
- Londesborough
- Molesworth (border with Perth County)
- Mount Carmel (border with Middlesex County)
- Nile
- Port Albert
- St. Augustine
- St. Columban (border with Perth County)
- St. Joseph
- Saltford
- Seaforth
- Shipka
- Summerhill
- Sunshine
- Vanastra
- Varna
- Walton
- Whitechurch (border with Bruce County)
- Wingham
- Winthrop
- Whalen Corners (border with Perth and Middlesex Counties)
- Woodham (border with Perth County)
- Wroxeter
- Zurich

=== Former communities/ghost towns ===
- Donnybrook
- Francistown
- Mafeking
- McGaw
- Rodgerville
- Sodom
- Spidertown (border with Middlesex County)

== In popular culture ==
Huron County is the setting for many stories written by Alice Munro.

== See also ==
- List of municipalities in Ontario
- List of Ontario Census Divisions
- List of townships in Ontario
- List of counties in Ontario
- List of secondary schools in Ontario#Huron County
