= Darwin McCutcheon =

Canadian ice hockey player

- Born: April 19, 1962 (age 64) Listowel, Ontario, Canada
- Height: 6 ft 5 in (196 cm)
- Weight: 218 lb (99 kg; 15 st 8 lb)
- Position: Defence
- Shot: Right
- Played for: Toronto Maple Leafs
- NHL draft: 179th overall, 1980; Toronto Maple Leafs
- Playing career: 1979–1991

Darwin McCutcheon (born April 19, 1962) is a Canadian retired professional ice hockey defenceman. He played one game in the National Hockey League with the Toronto Maple Leafs during the 1981–82 season, on December 31, 1981 against the Detroit Red Wings. McCutcheon was born in Listowel, Ontario, but grew up in Brussels, Ontario.

== Playing career ==
McCutcheon signed with the Kitchener Rangers as a walk-on and played 3 years in the Ontario Hockey League with the Rangers, Toronto Marlboros and was the captain of the Windsor Spitfires in his last year of junior. He was called up to the Toronto Maple Leafs in his last year. He then played hockey for the University of Prince Edward Island for 4 years and was named All Star 3 years and also All Canadian 1984–85.

== Career statistics ==
=== Regular season and playoffs ===
			Regular season					Playoffs
Season	Team	League	GP	G	A	Pts	PIM	GP	G	A	Pts	PIM
1979–80	Kitchener Rangers	OMJHL	28	0	3	3	30	—	—	—	—	—
1979–80	Toronto Marlboros	OMJHL	18	0	1	1	2	1	0	0	0	0
1980–81	Windsor Spitfires	OHL	26	1	7	8	36	—	—	—	—	—
1980–81	Toronto Marlboros	OHL	38	1	3	4	50	—	—	—	—	—
1981–82	Toronto Maple Leafs	NHL	1	0	0	0	2	—	—	—	—	—
1981–82	Windsor Spitfires	OHL	67	5	24	29	141	9	1	3	4	24
1982–83	Kitchener Rangers	OHL	11	4	7	11	25	—	—	—	—	—
1982–83	University of Prince Edward Island	CIAU	9	1	6	7	26	—	—	—	—	—
1983–84	University of Prince Edward Island	CIAU	24	4	13	17	25	—	—	—	—	—
1984–85	University of Prince Edward Island	CIAU	24	5	30	35	73	—	—	—	—	—
1985–86	University of Prince Edward Island	CIAU	24	4	21	25	55	—	—	—	—	—
1985–86	Moncton Golden Flames	AHL	12	0	2	2	31	9	0	0	0	9
1986–87	Moncton Golden Flames	AHL	69	1	10	11	187	4	0	1	1	51
1987–88	Salt Lake Golden Eagles	IHL	64	2	9	11	150	13	0	2	2	94
1988–89	Flint Spirits	IHL	37	2	4	6	89	—	—	—	—	—
1988–89	Indianapolis Ice	IHL	34	2	6	8	99	—	—	—	—	—
1989–90	Charlottetown Islanders	NBSHL	10	0	1	1	4	—	—	—	—	—
1990–91	Charlottetown Islanders	NBSHL	20	5	20	25	85	—	—	—	—	—
IHL totals			135	6	19	25	338	13	0	2	2	94
NHL totals			1	0	0	0	2	—	—	—	—	—
