= Frances Beatrice Taylor =

Canadian journalist, poet, and playwright

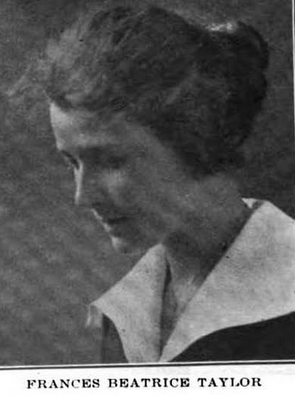
- Taylor in a 1922 publication
- Born: May 15, 1891; Brussels, Ontario, Canada
- Died: June 10, 1979 (aged 88)
- Occupations: Journalist, poet, playwright
- Writing career
- Pen name: F. B. Taylor

Frances Beatrice Taylor (May 15, 1891 – June 10, 1979) was a Canadian journalist, poet, and playwright.

== Early life ==
Frances Beatrice Taylor was born in Brussels, Ontario, the daughter of Robert Leslie Taylor and Mollie Chipman Smith Taylor. Her father was a barrister.

== Career ==
Taylor was editor of the woman's department of The London Free Press. She also wrote (under the byline "F. B. Taylor") a column and reviewed music, theatre, and books for the daily newspaper for more than forty years, from 1919 to her retirement in the 1960s.

Taylor began writing poetry for publication as a teenager. In 1919, her "Pioneer of the Air" shared first prize from the Ottawa Arts and Letters Club for best Canadian poem. Her poem "Immutable" was published in The New York Times in 1927. She published a Christmas story, The Song of Korthan (1923). Her poetry was collected in a volume, White Winds of Dawn (1924).

Taylor also wrote two plays that were produced in London, Ontario: Masque of All Souls and Bayberry Candles. She was a member of the Canadian Authors Association and the London Women's Press Club. She was one of the founders of the London Drama League.

== Personal life ==
Taylor lived with her friend and colleague Marion Ellis. Frances Beatrice Taylor died in 1979, aged 88 years.
