= Mafeking, Ontario =

Human settlement in Ontario, Canada

Coordinates: 43.91375°N 81.606604°W

Mafeking was a small hamlet in Southwestern Ontario that is now a dispersed rural community. Located at the intersection of Tower Line Road and the 9th Concession of Ashfield-Colborne-Wawanosh (Belgrave Road) it is approximately 9 km from Lucknow and 31.5 km from Goderich. At its peak population in 1901, Mafeking was home to about four families.

== History ==
The first log schoolhouse was built in the area in 1861, and was replaced by a permanent brick structure in 1924. Known officially as SS#9 but more commonly referred to as Finlay's School or Mafeking School, the one-room schoolhouse operated from 1924 until 1967 and had 45 pupils graduate during its tenure. The building was also used as the township hall until the Ashfield Municipal Road Shed was built in the adjacent lot. The school still stands on Belgrave Road but is now used primarily for storage. The first post office was opened in Mafeking in 1900 by William Stuthers who was also postmaster from 1911 until its closure in 1915 when it was amalgamated into the RR#7 Lucknow postal route. Other postmasters in Mafeking included W.J. Treleaven (1900–1915) and Anson Finlay (1901–1911). Today the original post office still stands and is used as a private residence.
