= North Huron, Ontario =

North Huron
- Township (lower-tier)
- Township of North Huron
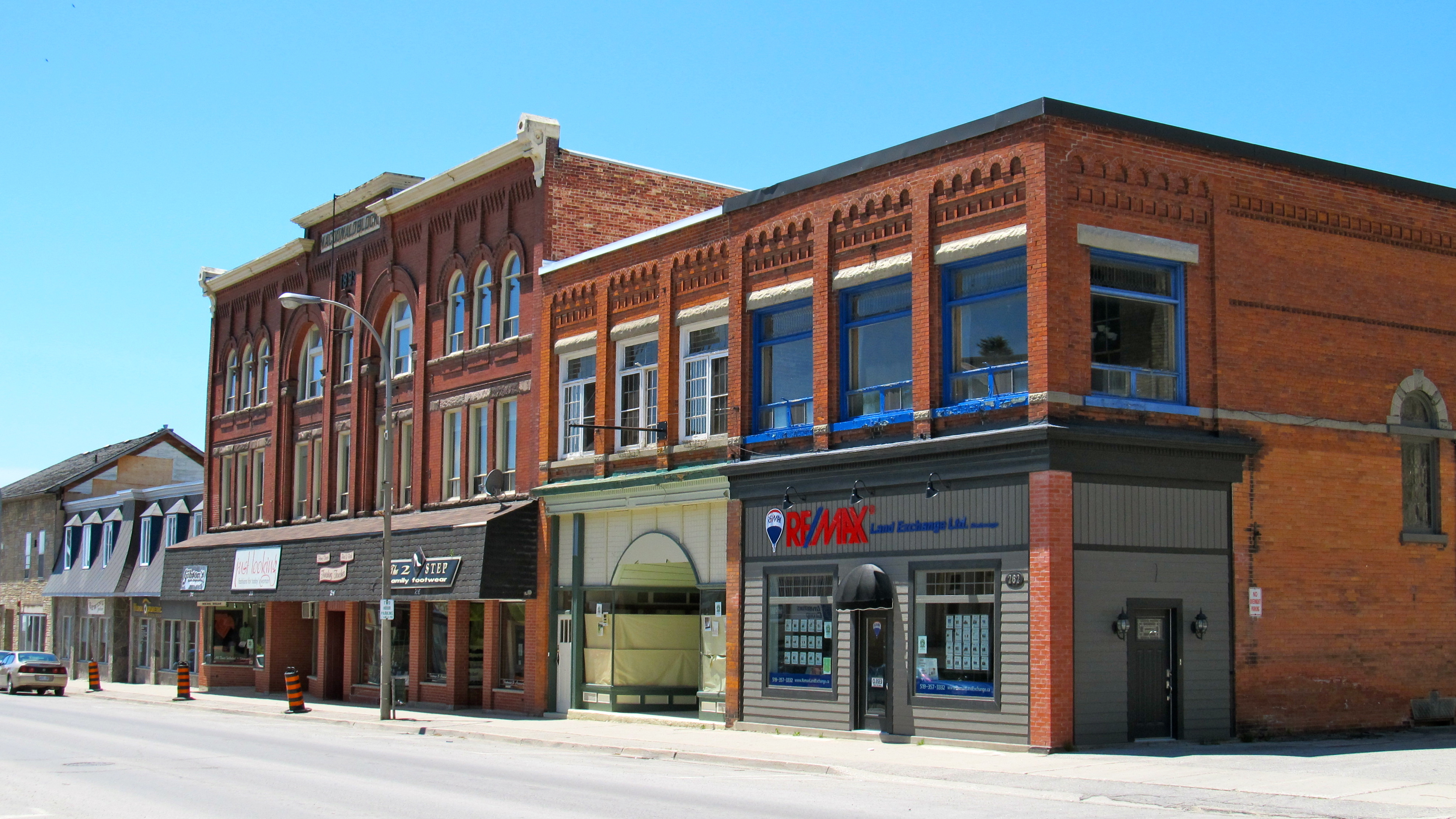
- Wingham

- Location within Southern Ontario
- Coordinates: 43.83°N 81.42°W
- Country: Canada
- Province: Ontario
- County: Huron
- Formed: January 1, 2001

Government
  - Reeve: Paul Heffer
  - Fed. riding: Huron—Bruce
  - Prov. riding: Huron—Bruce

Area
  - Land: 179.01 km^{2} (69.12 sq mi)

Population (2021)
  - Total: 5,052
  - Density: 28.2/km^{2} (73/sq mi)
- Time zone: UTC-5 (EST)
  - Summer (DST): UTC-4 (EDT)
- Postal Code: N0G
- Area codes: 519, 226, 548
- Website: www.northhuron.ca

The Township of North Huron is a municipality in Huron County, Ontario, Canada. It was formed on January 1, 2001, when the former township of East Wawanosh was merged with the village of Blyth and the town of Wingham, as part of a province-wide municipal amalgamation imposed by the Government of Ontario.

== Communities ==
Besides the town of Wingham and the village of Blyth, the township of North Huron comprises a number of villages and hamlets, including:

- Former Wawanosh East Township: - Belgrave, (Note: Shared with the Municipality of Morris-Turnberry; and formerly shared between Morris and Wawanosh East Townships.) Blyth, (Note: Shared with the Township of Central Huron and the Municipality of Morris-Turnberry; and formerly shared between Hullett, Morris and Wawanosh East Townships.) Whitechurch, (Note: Partially shared with the Township of Huron-Kinloss within Bruce County.) Wingham; (Note: Shared with the Municipality of Morris-Turnberry; and formerly shared between Morris, Turnberry and Wawanosh East Townships. Former village within Turnberry Township.) Auburn; (Note: Shared with the Township of Ashfield–Colborne–Wawanosh and the Municipality of Central Huron; and formerly shared between Hullett, Wawanosh East and Wawanosh West Townships.) Donnybrook, (Note: Shared with the Township of Ashfield–Colborne–Wawanosh.) Fordyce, Hutton Heights, (Note: Shared with the Municipality of Morris-Turnberry.) Marnock, Westfield

== History ==
Indigenous people's presence in North Huron has been recorded long before European settlers arrived in the 1830s. The largest part of the township - East Wawanosh - is named after Chippewa Chief Wawanosh who signed an 1825 land use treaty. Arrowheads and other indigenous artifacts have been found by East Wawanosh farmers since European settlement.

Wawanosh was originally the largest township in Huron County, with 85,640 acres. According to an early land assessment, there were 133 residents in 1844 and 87 acres of land cultivated. In 1850, an acre of land cost 8 shillings. Within 20 years, the population grew to 3,151 residents, with 12,000 acres cleared.

In 1866, Wawanosh was divided into two separate townships - East Wawanosh and West Wawanosh, which is now part of Ashfield-Colborne-Wawanosh township.

By 1869, Belgrave was a village with a population of 50 in the Township of Morris County, Huron. It was established on the Maitland River. It was a stop on the Buffalo and Lake Huron Railway. There were stages to Wingham, Teeswater, Riversdale and Kincardine. The average price of land was $20.

More than 20 schools have existed in North Huron. From the 1850s to 1960s, more than a dozen rural school houses educated the children of East Wawanosh. In 1967, East Wawanosh Public School was opened and taught hundreds of children from Kindergarten to Grade 8. The school closed in 2012, with remaining students sent to Wingham.

== Demographics ==
In the 2021 Census of Population conducted by Statistics Canada, North Huron had a population of 5,052 living in 2,157 of its 2,277 total private dwellings, a change of 2.4% from its 2016 population of 4,932. With a land area of 179.01 km^{2} (69.12 sq mi), it had a population density of 28.2/km^{2} (73.1/sq mi) in 2021.

Historical census populations – North Huron
Year	Pop.	±%
2001	4,984	—
2006	5,015	+0.6%
2011	4,884	−2.6%
2016	4,932	+1.0%
2021	5,052	+2.4%
Source: Statistics Canada

Age distribution (2016)
	0-14	15-64	65+	Total
Total	885	3,055	995	4,930
Male	460	1,505	470	2,435
Female	430	1,545	525	2,495
Source: Stats Canada

== Notable people ==
Former residents include:

- Alice Munro - writer
- Jo Manning - artist
- George Agnew Reid - painter

== See also ==
- List of townships in Ontario
