= Spidertown, Ontario =

Former Town in Ontario

Coordinates: 43.251537°N 81.640601°W

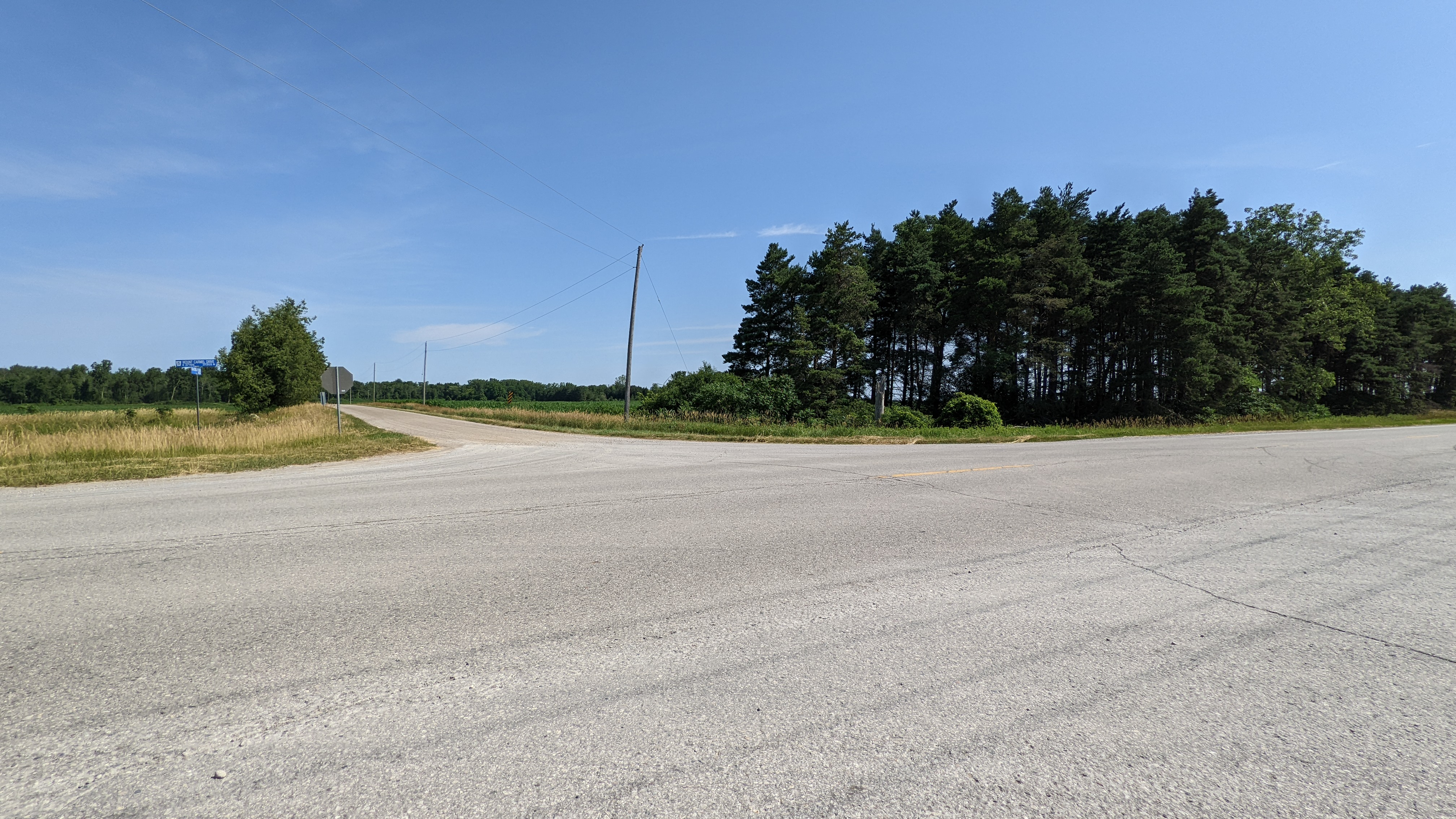

Spidertown was a small, agricultural supply and services based community in southwestern Ontario, Canada that existed in the last half of the 19th century and the early 20th century. The site of the former hamlet is located at the present intersection of Mount Carmel Drive, Blackbush Line and Salem Road, on the boundary between the current municipality of North Middlesex and the municipality of South Huron. Little is currently known of Spidertown's founding, nor the origin of its name. The hamlet is described in one source as consisting, at one point in time, of "taverns on both corners" and "four homes". It is known, that in the latter 19th century a general store was operated in the community by Alexander Todd, presumably the same individual who operated two other general stores during the period at Maguire and Moray as well. A medical doctor, T. L. Flaherty, maintained a practice in a corner house in the hamlet in the latter 19th century, but is known to have moved his office to Mount Carmel, 2 kilometers (1.2 mi) to the east, before 1898. It is believed that Spidertown began to go into decline because of its inability to compete economically with the nearby hamlet of Mount Carmel. Spidertown is recorded as having disappeared by 1914.

== Sources ==
- Mack, Susan Muriel (1992). The History of Stephen Township. Corporation of The Township of Stephen, pg. 236
- McGillivray Township History Group (1992) McGillivray Remembers 1842–1992., pg.69
- Grainger, Jennifer (2002). Vanished Villages of Middlesex. Natural Heritage Books, Toronto. pg. 163, ISBN 1-896219-51-9

== Online references ==
- Mack, Susan Muriel (1992). "The History of Stephen Township". Corporation of The Township of Stephen(via ouroots.ca). Archived from the original on 2007-09-26.
- "Western Ontario Gazetteer and Directory for 1898- 99.Page 476" (PDF). Ingersoll:Ontario Publishing & Advertising, [1898?]. (via Canadian Directories). Retrieved on 2018-08-06.
- "McGillivray Remembers 1842-1992". McGillivray Township History Group, Ailsa Craig (via ouroots.ca). 1992. Archived from the original on 2007-09-29.
