= Phyllis Davies =

British journalist and war correspondent

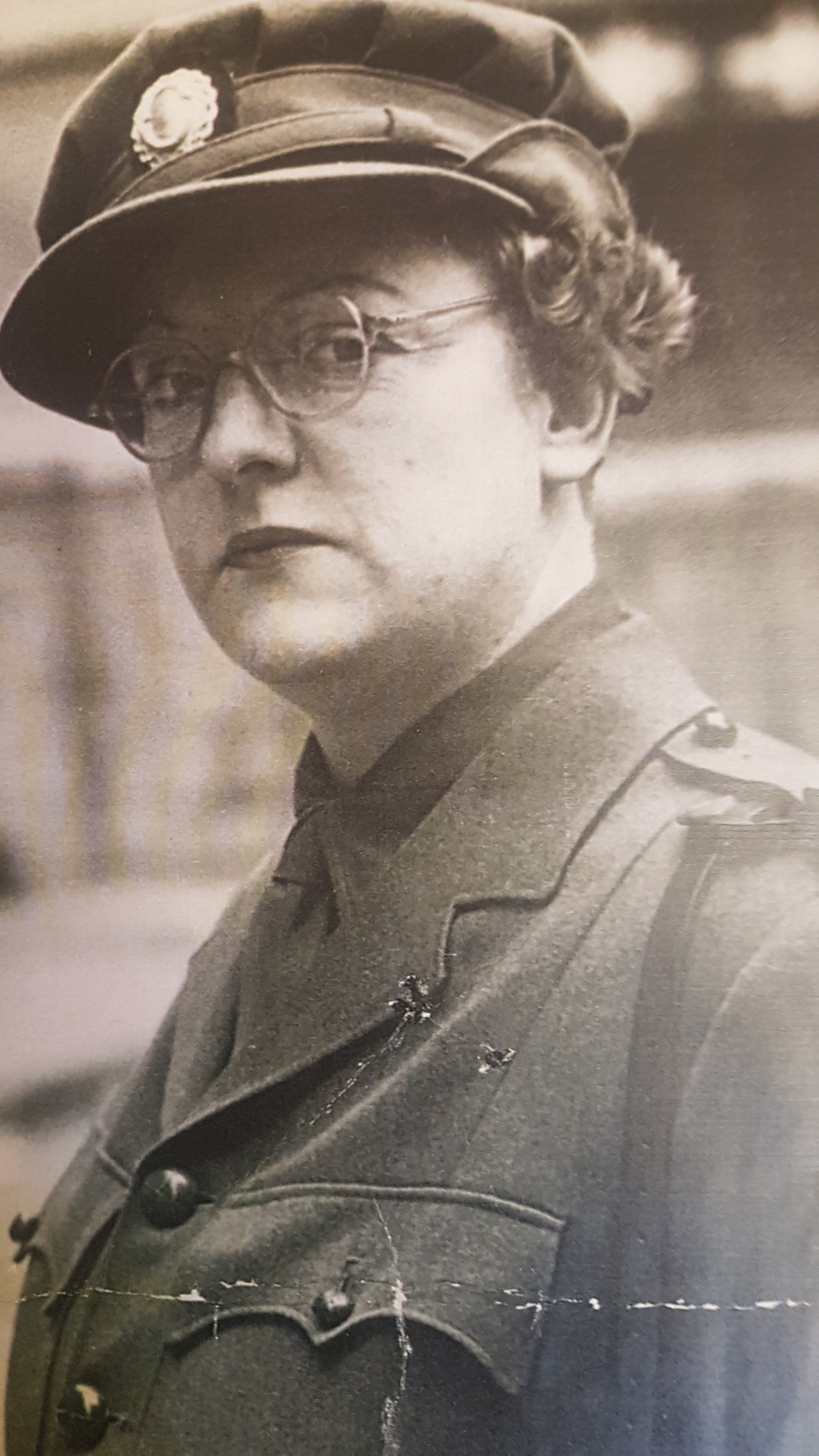

Phyllis Davies (14 January 1909 – 21 February 1997) was one of the first British women war correspondents, as well as the first woman to report crime on Fleet Street. She joined the Daily Mail in 1929, and in May 1945, was the only woman with the North Atlantic Fleet, which took the surrender of 8 German U-boats.

Davies was a founding member and the original vice-chair of The Women's Press Club.
