= Blyth, Ontario =

Blyth
- Unincorporated community
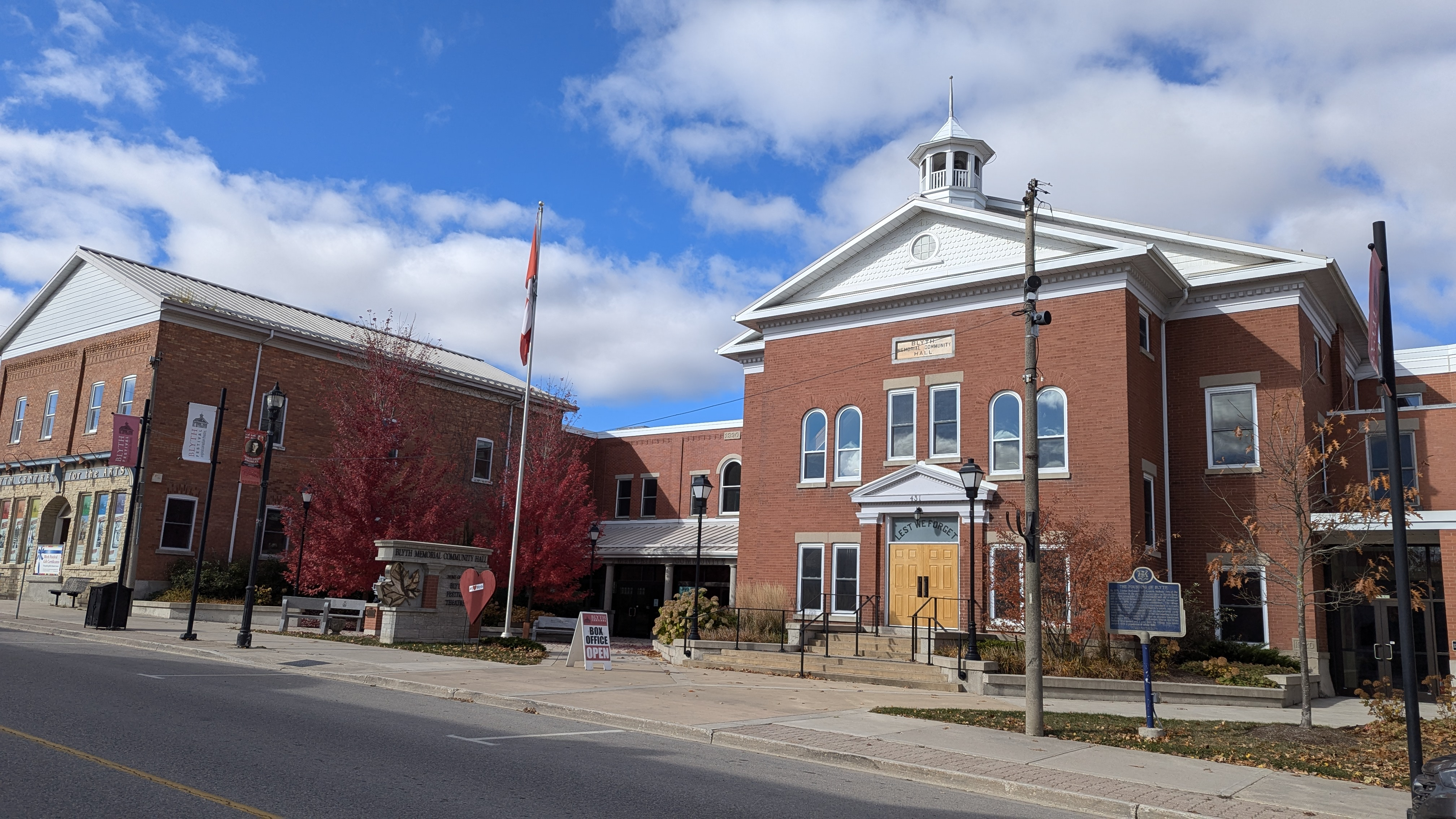
- Blyth Memorial Community Hall

- Location of Blyth in Southern Ontario
- Coordinates: 43°44′5″N 81°25′42″W
- Country: Canada
- Province: Ontario
- County: Huron
- Township: North Huron
- Founded: 1877

Area
  - Land: 2.5 km^{2} (0.97 sq mi)

Population (2021)
  - Total: 1,065
  - Density: 426.3/km^{2} (1,104/sq mi)
- Time zone: UTC-5 (EST)
  - Summer (DST): UTC-4 (EDT)
- Postal code: N0M 1H0
- NTS Map: 040P11
- GNBC Code: FAKIA

Blyth (/ˈblaɪ.ɛθ/ BLY-eth) is a village in North Huron, Ontario, Canada.

Blyth is 85 km (53 mi) north of London and 79 km (49 mi) west of Waterloo at the intersection of Huron County Road 4 (London Road) and Huron County Road 25 (Blyth Road). Blyth is also 24 km (15 mi) inland from Lake Huron.

The 2016 Canadian Census showed Blyth had a population of approximately 1,000 residents.

Despite its small size, Blyth has a significant national presence. The village attracts hundreds of thousands of visitors annually to its world-renowned theatre, destination craft brewery and large municipal campground. As well, Blyth has several prominent employers creating job opportunities not found in many rural regions of Canada.

== History ==
The first European settlers, Lucius McConnell and Kenneth McBean, arrived in what is now Blyth in 1851. The first store was opened by John Templeton. In 1854, John Drummond built the first hotel (present-day site of The Blyth Inn). A shoe shop, blacksmith shop, tailor shop and sawmill were all set up around the same time.

By 1855, a layout for the village of Drummond was made, however the village was renamed Blyth in recognition of British land speculator Henry David Blyth. In 1856, a post office was established and until 1891, the postal service officially, and incorrectly, spelled Blyth with an "e" on the end (Blythe). Henry Blyth never visited the village but the Blyth family held the holdings until his great-grandson Hugh William Blyth sold them in 1950.

By the mid-1860s, Blyth's businesses included a grist and flour mill, steam sawmill, 4 general stores, stove and tinshop, carriage and wagon factory, 3 blacksmith shops, a saddlery, a tailor shop, 3 shoe shops, a cooper shop, 3 hotels and one medical doctor.

In 1876, the first train service, The London, Huron and Bruce Railway, came to Blyth. One year later, the village was incorporated with a population of approximately 800 residents. The community's first elected reeve was Patrick Kelly.

The next year, a two-room public school was built and opened.

In the following decade, a chopping mill and cider press were opened. Other early businesses in Blyth included a bake shop, a cement block making shop, a Massey Harris implement shop, a livery, a dressmaker shop, the cooper shop that made renowned apple barrels.

In 1896, a four-room public school was constructed at the corner of King and Wellington Streets.

In 1907, a stop of the Canadian Pacific Railway line from Guelph to Goderich was established in Blyth. The daily train included a passenger coach with daily connections through to Toronto. The last train was in 1988, and the rail line is now the Guelph to Goderich (G2G) trail.

In 1920, construction began on the Blyth Memorial Hall, a joint effort by residents of Blyth and the Townships of East Wawanosh, Morris and Hullett. The Hall aimed to commemorate the lives of local World War 1 soldiers who died in the war. The sod was first turned and first cornerstone laid on July 28, 1920. The Hall placed 600 opera chairs in its auditorium and construction costs were estimated at $25,000. The Hall was frequently used in its early days for "banquets, council meetings, wedding receptions, Division Court Sessions, community dances" along with vaudeville productions, community musicals and local talent shows. However, interest in the Hall waned by the mid-1950s, and the auditorium was rarely used and eventually condemned. A local group of citizens campaigned and fundraised to renovate it.

By 1975, the Blyth Festival produced its first professional theatre production in Blyth. The summer theatre eventually turned into the Blyth Centre for the Arts, incorporating an art gallery, choir and orchestra.

In 2001, Blyth amalgamated with East Wawanosh Township and Wingham to form the Township of North Huron.

Blyth has been recognized as a model for Canadian rural communities who incorporate arts and culture to diversify community economy to move beyond solely an agriculture-based model.

== Activities ==
The Blyth Festival is a theatre with two venues, the outdoor Harvest Stage and the Memorial Hall. It has been presenting plays since 1975.

Huron Pioneers Threshers annually holds a steam tractor show at the fairgrounds and arena during the weekend following Labor Day. The event provides a tractor show featuring antique tractors. The Huron Pioneer Thresher & Hobby Association’s annual Thresher Reunion is a tradition held in Blyth, Ontario, every year the weekend following Labor Day. The event is held across the fairgrounds and adjacent community spaces, drawing hundreds of volunteers and campers from early September. Highlights include: historic machinery in action, interactive demonstrations, live entertainment and community engagement.

The three-day event supports agricultural heritage and community bonding.

== Demographics ==
In the 2021 Census of Population conducted by Statistics Canada, Blyth had a population of 1,065 living in 461 of its 489 total private dwellings, a change of 7.7% from its 2016 population of 989. With a land area of 2.5 km^{2} (0.97 sq mi), it had a population density of 426.0/km^{2} (1,103.3/sq mi) in 2021.

== Media ==
Blyth is home to the North Huron Citizen print and online newspaper.

== Notable people ==
- Lorna deBlicquy: Female aviation pioneer and member of The Order of Canada.
- Ron Mason: Most successful hockey coach in NCAA history. Member of the United States Hockey Hall of Fame.
- Justin Peters: Professional hockey player (goalie), bronze medalists with 2018 Canadian Men's Olympic Hockey Team.
- Anthony Peters: Professional hockey player (goalie), brother of Justin.

== Awards ==
In 2001, Blyth won the Communities in Bloom National Award in the category of 1 to 1000 population. This award recognizes civic pride, environmental responsibility and beautification through community involvement and the challenge of a national program, with focus on enhancing green spaces in communities.

== Climate ==
Climate data for Blyth, 1981−2010 normals, extremes 1959−2010
Month	Jan	Feb	Mar	Apr	May	Jun	Jul	Aug	Sep	Oct	Nov	Dec	Year
Record high °C (°F)	18.0 (64.4)	17.5 (63.5)	24.5 (76.1)	30.0 (86.0)	32.5 (90.5)	34.5 (94.1)	36.5 (97.7)	35.5 (95.9)	34.0 (93.2)	29.5 (85.1)	21.0 (69.8)	17.5 (63.5)	36.5 (97.7)
Mean daily maximum °C (°F)	−3.8 (25.2)	−2 (28)	2.7 (36.9)	10.7 (51.3)	17.5 (63.5)	23.2 (73.8)	25.9 (78.6)	24.8 (76.6)	20.5 (68.9)	13.2 (55.8)	6.1 (43.0)	−0.4 (31.3)	11.5 (52.7)
Daily mean °C (°F)	−7 (19)	−5.7 (21.7)	−1.4 (29.5)	6.0 (42.8)	12.2 (54.0)	17.7 (63.9)	20.4 (68.7)	19.5 (67.1)	15.5 (59.9)	9.1 (48.4)	3.1 (37.6)	−3.2 (26.2)	7.2 (45.0)
Mean daily minimum °C (°F)	−10.2 (13.6)	−9.4 (15.1)	−5.5 (22.1)	1.3 (34.3)	6.8 (44.2)	12.1 (53.8)	14.8 (58.6)	14.1 (57.4)	10.5 (50.9)	4.9 (40.8)	0.1 (32.2)	−6 (21)	2.8 (37.0)
Record low °C (°F)	−31.1 (−24.0)	−36 (−33)	−28.5 (−19.3)	−16.1 (3.0)	−5 (23)	−1.1 (30.0)	1.7 (35.1)	0.0 (32.0)	−3.5 (25.7)	−10 (14)	−16 (3)	−28.5 (−19.3)	−36 (−33)
Average precipitation mm (inches)	130.5 (5.14)	93.8 (3.69)	74.9 (2.95)	84.5 (3.33)	102.6 (4.04)	81.5 (3.21)	80.6 (3.17)	101.4 (3.99)	123.1 (4.85)	102.0 (4.02)	126.4 (4.98)	145.6 (5.73)	1,246.9 (49.09)
Average rainfall mm (inches)	26.1 (1.03)	27.6 (1.09)	37.6 (1.48)	70.4 (2.77)	102.3 (4.03)	81.5 (3.21)	80.6 (3.17)	101.4 (3.99)	123.1 (4.85)	97.6 (3.84)	84.7 (3.33)	40.1 (1.58)	872.8 (34.36)
Average snowfall cm (inches)	104.4 (41.1)	66.2 (26.1)	37.4 (14.7)	14.1 (5.6)	0.3 (0.1)	0.0 (0.0)	0.0 (0.0)	0.0 (0.0)	0.0 (0.0)	4.4 (1.7)	41.8 (16.5)	105.5 (41.5)	374.1 (147.3)
Average precipitation days (≥ 0.2 mm)	16.9	13.1	11.7	11	11.2	9.3	8.8	9.3	11.9	12.7	15.5	17.4	148.6
Average rainy days (≥ 0.2 mm)	4.0	3.4	5.4	8.7	11.2	9.3	8.8	9.3	11.9	12.5	10.9	5.9	101.1
Average snowy days (≥ 0.2 cm)	13.8	10.5	7.0	2.9	0.12	0.0	0.0	0.0	0.0	0.77	5.2	12.9	53.2
Source: Environment Canada
