= Ashfield–Colborne–Wawanosh =

Ashfield-Colborne-Wawanosh
- Township (lower-tier)
- Township of Ashfield-Colborne-Wawanosh
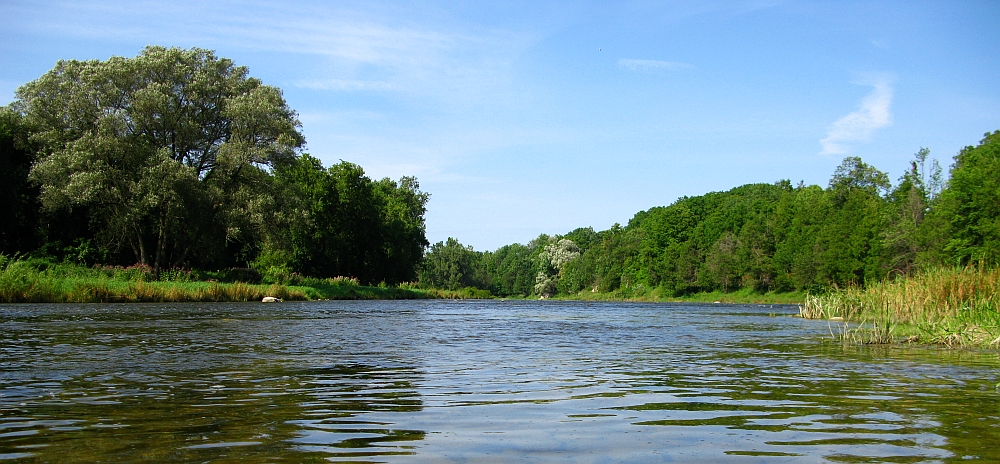

- Location within Southern Ontario
- Coordinates: 43°52′N 81°36′W
- Country: Canada
- Province: Ontario
- County: Huron
- Formed: January 1, 2001

Government
  - Mayor: Glen McNeil
  - Fed. riding: Huron—Bruce
  - Prov. riding: Huron—Bruce

Area
  - Land: 586.88 km^{2} (226.60 sq mi)
- Elevation: 269 m (883 ft)

Population (2021)
  - Total: 5,884
  - Density: 10/km^{2} (26/sq mi)
- Time zone: UTC−05:00 (EST)
  - Summer (DST): UTC−04:00 (EDT)
- Area code(s): 519, 226, 548
- Website: www.acwtownship.ca

The Township of Ashfield–Colborne–Wawanosh is a municipality in Huron County, Ontario, Canada. It was formed as an amalgamation of the former Ashfield, Colborne and West Wawanosh townships on January 1, 2001, in an Ontario-wide local government restructuring imposed by the government of that time. The three former townships now comprise the wards of the amalgamated municipality.

== Geography ==
Ashfield–Colborne–Wawanosh is located in the northwest corner of Huron County. Lake Huron is the western boundary and the Township has 35.3 km (21.9 mi) of Lake Huron shoreline. Its southern boundary is the Maitland River between Goderich and Auburn. The eastern border is Huron Road 22, from Auburn north to Huron Road 86 near Whitechurch. Huron Road 86 is generally the northern border of Ashfield–Colborne–Wawanosh except for the Lucknow community limits which are in Bruce County.

=== Communities ===
The township of Ashfield–Colborne–Wawanosh comprises a number of villages and hamlets, including the following communities:

- Former Ashfield Township: – Amberley, (Note: Shared with the Municipality of Huron-Kinloss; and formerly shared between Ashfield and Huron Townships.) Belfast, (Note: Formerly shared between Ashfield and West Wawanosh Townships.) Dungannon, Kingsbridge, Kintail, Lochalsh, Lucknow, (Note: Shared with the Township of Huron-Kinloss; and formerly shared between Ashfield, Kinloss and West Wawanosh Townships.) Nile, (Note: Formerly shared between Ashfield and Colborne Townships.) Port Albert; Crewe, Lanes, Lothian, Mafeking, Sheppardton, Zion
- Former Colborne Township: – Benmiller, Nile, Saltford; Bogies Beach, Carlow, Dunlop, Loyal, McGaw, Meneset, Sheppardton Sunset Beach
- Former West Wawanosh Township: – Auburn, (Note: Shared with the Municipality of Central Huron and the Township of North Huron.) Belfast, Dungannon, St. Augustine, St. Helens; Donnybrook, (Note: Shared with the Municipality of North Huron.) Fordyce, Prosperity, Saratoga

== Military history ==
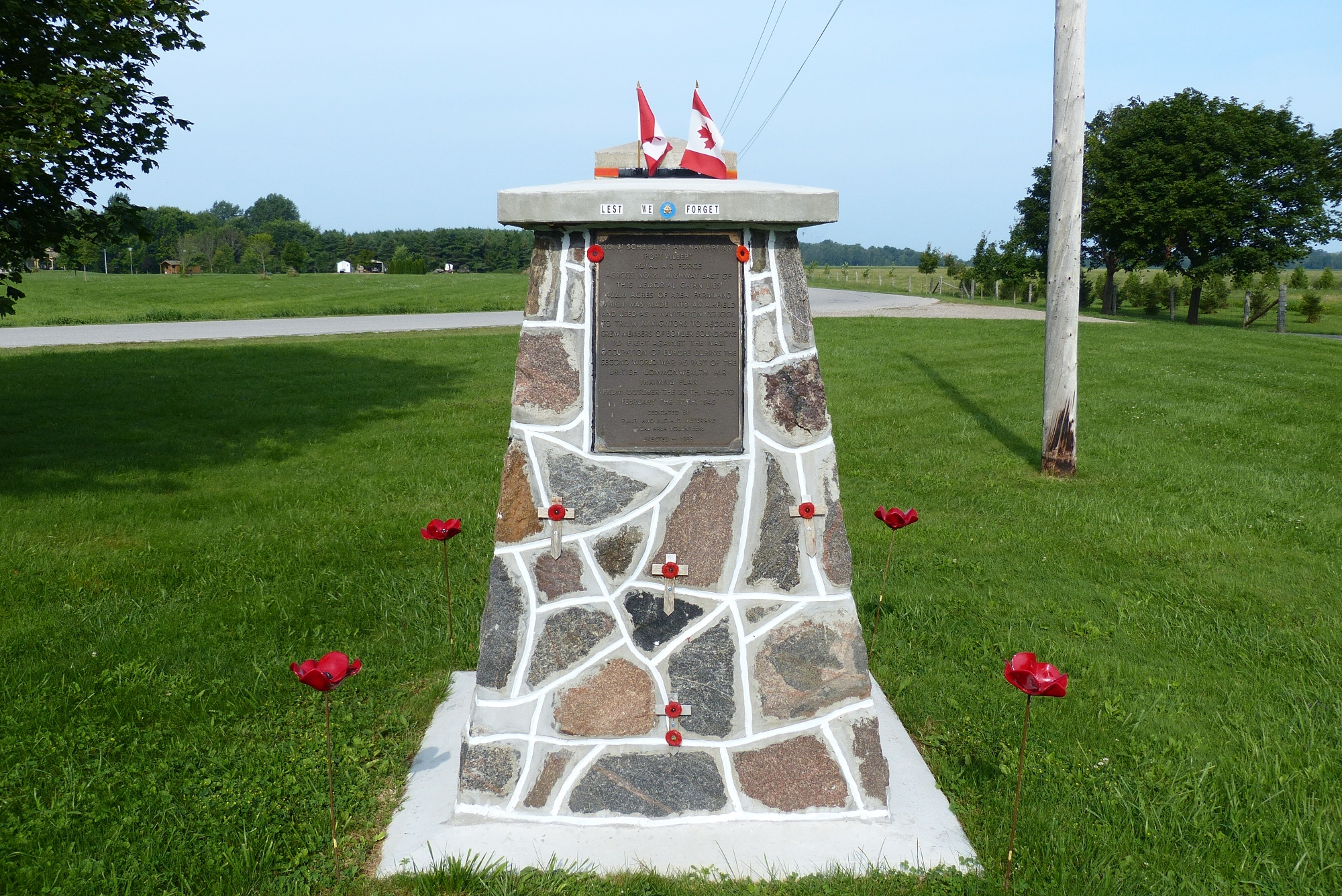
The memorial at Port Albert for Royal Air Force No. 31 Air Navigation School

During World War II the Royal Air Force operated No. 31 Air Navigation School as part of the British Commonwealth Air Training Plan on Highway 21 near Port Albert. The school relocated from Great Britain to RCAF Station Port Albert on 18 November 1940 and closed on 17 February 1945.

The 402 acres (163 ha) site was later used as a race car track and in 2013 is farmland.

There is a memorial cairn and plaque at 83700 Highway 21. The airfield was located across the road from the cairn at 43°53′5″N 081°41′48″W . The Huron Country Museum in nearby Goderich, Ontario has an extensive collection of artifacts from No. 31 ANS.

== Demographics ==
In the 2021 Census of Population conducted by Statistics Canada, Ashfield–Colborne–Wawanosh had a population of 5,884 living in 2,357 of its 3,149 total private dwellings, a change of 8.5% from its 2016 population of 5,422. With a land area of 586.88 km^{2} (226.60 sq mi), it had a population density of 10.0/km^{2} (26.0/sq mi) in 2021.

Canada census – Ashfield-Colborne-Wawanosh community profile

	2021	2016	2011
Population	5,884 (+8.5% from 2016)	5,422 (-2.9% from 2011)	5,582 (+3.2% from 2006)
Land area	586.88 km^{2} (226.60 sq mi)	586.97 km^{2} (226.63 sq mi)	587.08 km^{2} (226.67 sq mi)
Population density	10.0/km^{2} (26/sq mi)	9.2/km^{2} (24/sq mi)	9.5/km^{2} (25/sq mi)
Median age	51.2 (M: 49.2, F: 52.0)	47.7 (M: 47.7, F: 47.8)	45.3 (M: 45.3, F: 45.3)
Private dwellings	3,149 (total) 2,357 (occupied)	2,105 (total)	3,034 (total)
Median household income	$$78,000	$70,496

References: 2021 2016 2011

Historical census populations – Ashfield–Colborne–Wawanosh
Year	Pop.	±%
1996	5,477	—
2001	5,411	−1.2%
2006	5,409	−0.0%
2011	5,582	+3.2%
2016	5,422	−2.9%
2021	5,884	+8.5%
Source: Statistics Canada

== Transportation ==
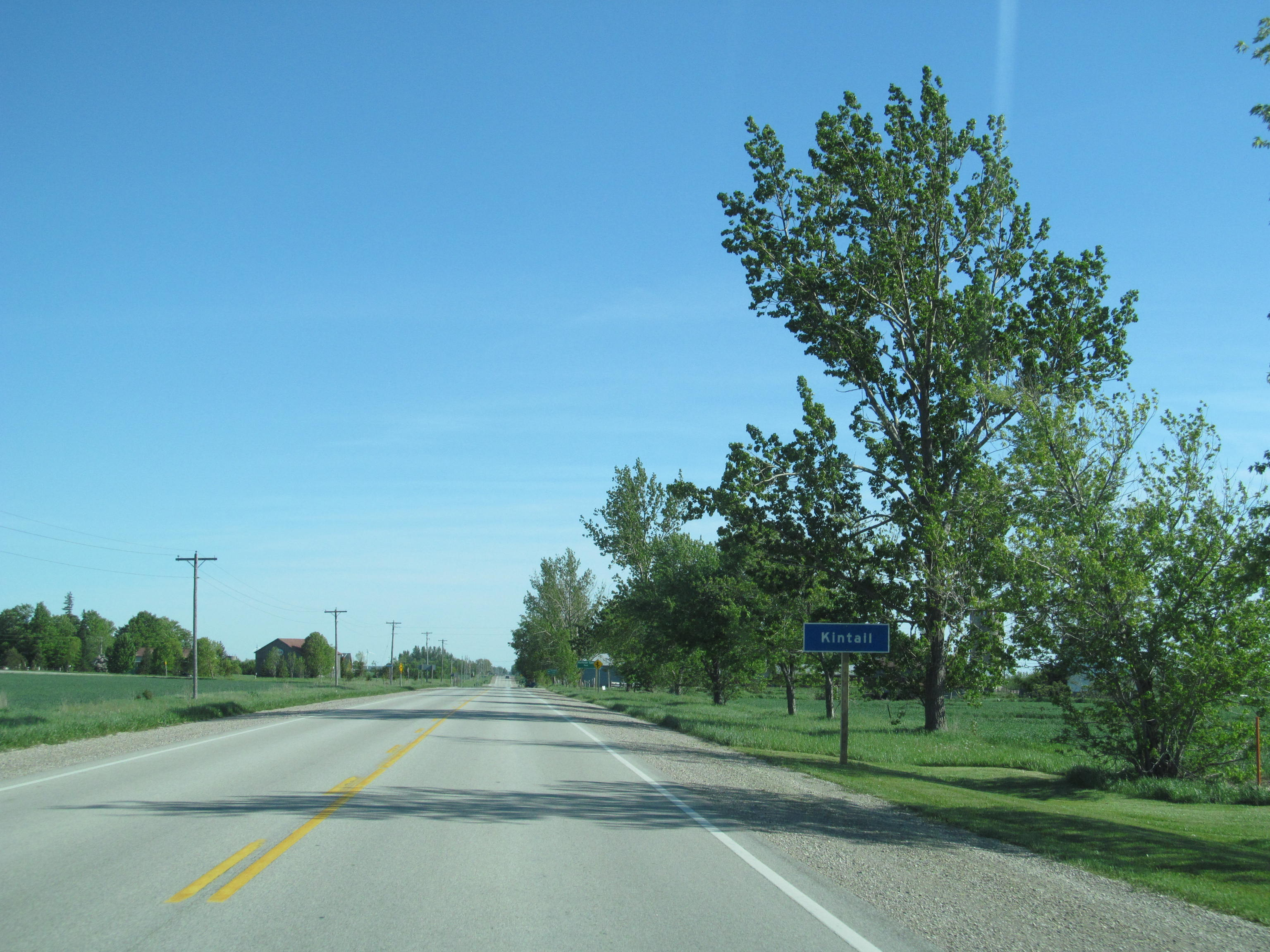
Highway 21 at Kintail

Highway 21 travels through the western portion of the township.

Huron Road 1 proceeds north from Benmiller through Carlow then Lucknow.

Goderich Municipal Airport is also located in the Township of ACW.

Huron Road 25 proceeds east from Highway 21 to the edge of ACW at Huron Road 22 in Auburn.

== Facilities ==
Municipal offices are located west of Carlow (82133 Council Line), north-east of Goderich at the south end of the township.

== See also ==
- List of municipalities in Ontario
- List of townships in Ontario
