= Central Huron =

- Municipality (lower-tier)
- Municipality of Central Huron
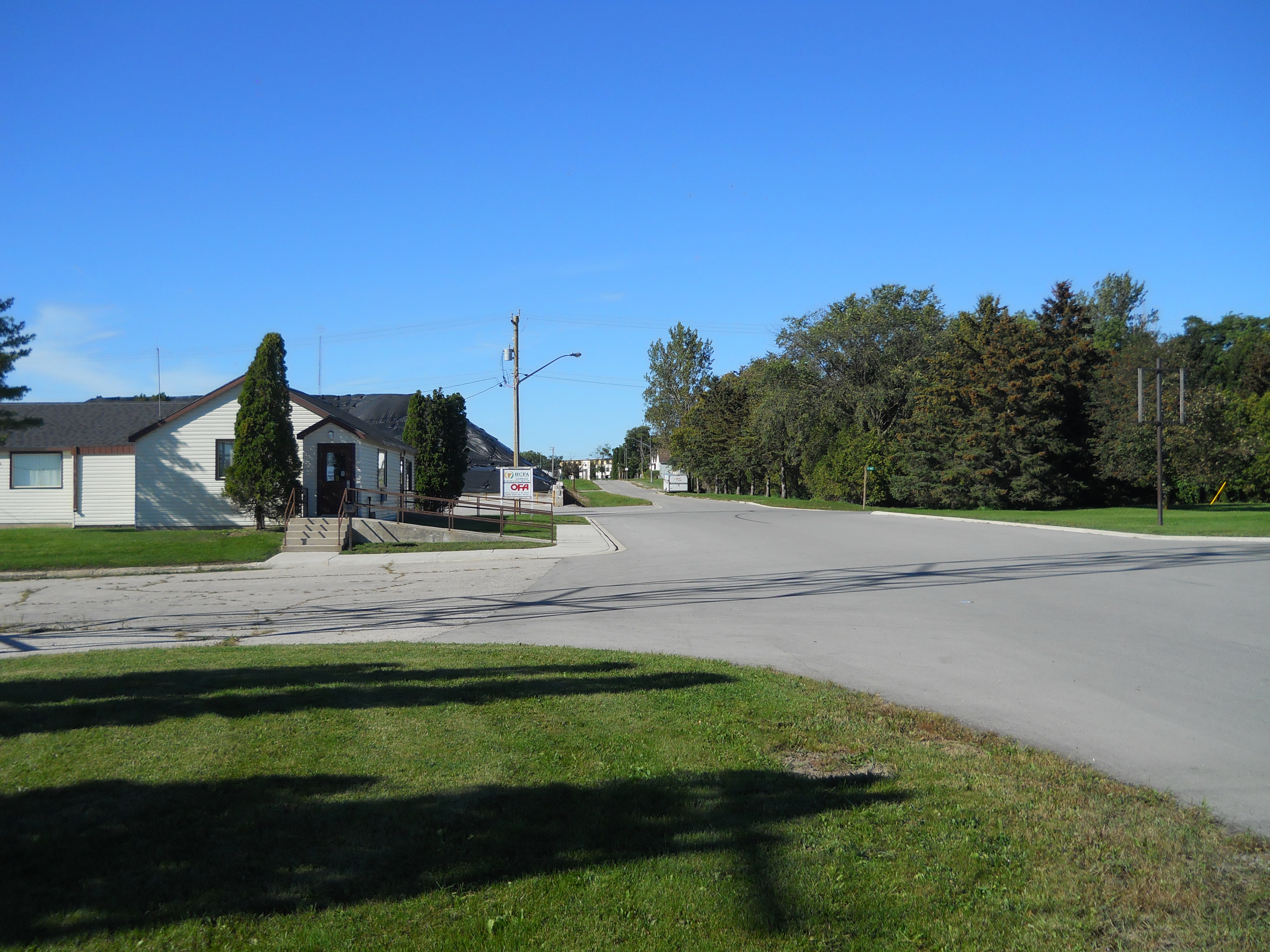
- CFB Clinton

- Location within Southern Ontario
- Coordinates: 43°38′N 81°34′W
- Country: Canada
- Province: Ontario
- County: Huron
- Settled: ca. 1850
- Formed: January 1, 2001

Government
  - Mayor: Jim Ginn
  - Fed. riding: Huron—Bruce
  - Prov. riding: Huron—Bruce

Area
  - Land: 449.43 km^{2} (173.53 sq mi)

Population (2021)
  - Total: 7,799
  - Density: 16.9/km^{2} (44/sq mi)
- Time zone: UTC-5 (EST)
  - Summer (DST): UTC-4 (EDT)
- Postal Code: N0M
- Area codes: 519, 226
- Website: www.centralhuron.com

Central Huron is a township in western Ontario, Canada, in Huron County. It is situated on Lake Huron between the Maitland River and the Bayfield River.

== History ==
The Municipality of Central Huron was formed on January 1, 2001, when the Town of Clinton, the Township of Hullett, and Township of Goderich were amalgamated.

== Communities ==
The municipality of Central Huron comprises a number of villages and hamlets, including the following communities:

- Former Goderich Township: - Blue Water Beach, Clinton, (Note: Shared with the Municipality of Huron East; and formerly shared between Goderich and Hullett Townships.) Holmesville, Porter's Hill, Summerhill (Note: Formerly shared between Goderich and Hullett Townships.)
- Former Hullett Township: - Auburn, (Note: Shared with the Township of Ashfield–Colborne–Wawanosh.) Blyth, (Note: Shared with the Township of North Huron and the Municipality of Morris-Turnberry; and formerly shared between Hullett, Morris and Wawanosh East Townships.) Clinton, Harlock, Kinburn, Londesborough, Summerhill

== Demographics ==
In the 2021 Census of Population conducted by Statistics Canada, Central Huron had a population of 7,799 living in 3,267 of its 3,917 total private dwellings, a change of 2.9% from its 2016 population of 7,576. With a land area of 449.43 km^{2} (173.53 sq mi), it had a population density of 17.4/km^{2} (44.9/sq mi) in 2021.

Canada census – Central Huron community profile

	2021	2016	2011
Population	7,799 (+2.9% from 2016)	7,576 (−0.1% from 2011)	7,591 (−0.7% from 2006)
Land area	449.43 km^{2} (173.53 sq mi)	449.58 km^{2} (173.58 sq mi)	450.33 km^{2} (173.87 sq mi)
Population density	17.4/km^{2} (45/sq mi)	16.9/km^{2} (44/sq mi)	16.9/km^{2} (44/sq mi)
Median age	48.8 (M: 48.4, F: 49.2)	47.3 (M: 47.0, F: 47.7)	47.5 (M: 46.8, F: 48.0)
Private dwellings	3,917 (total) 3,267 (occupied)	3,823 (total)	4,010 (total)
Median household income	$80,000	$67,093

References: 2021 2016 2011

Historical census populations – Central Huron
Year	Pop.	±%
1996	7,862	—
2001	7,806	−0.7%
2006	7,641	−2.1%
2011	7,591	−0.7%
2016	7,576	−0.2%
2021	7,799	+2.9%
Source: Statistics Canada

== See also ==
- List of townships in Ontario
