= Whitechurch, Ontario =

Coordinates: 43.917971°N 81.405071°W

Whitechurch is a small residential village located in south-western Ontario.

== Location ==
Whitechurch is located along the border of Huron and Bruce County. It is approximately 10 km west of Wingham, and 8 km east of Lucknow. The coordinates to Whitechurch are 43°55'01.9"N 81°24'20.6"W.

== History ==
Originally named Ulster, the name was changed when surveying for the former Ontario Highway 86, now Huron/Bruce County Road 86.

== Churches ==
The Whitechurch United Church closed on June 24, 2007.

The Whitechurch Presbyterian Church closed in the summer of 2016.

The Whitechurch Amish Mennonite Church was established in 1999 as a daughter congregation of the Cedar Grove Amish Mennonite Church. In 2018 the church had 35 members and was a member of the Maranatha Amish Mennonite Churches. The ministerial team included Bishop Larry Ropp, Minister Charles Jantzi, and Deacon Jeffrey Kuepfer.

== Points of Interest ==
The following points of interest are located within village limits.

- Whitechurch Community Hall
- Whitechurch Community Park
- Whitechurch Community Baseball Park
