= Benmiller, Ontario =

Coordinates: 43.725088°N 81.629984°W

Benmiller, Ontario, is a community located in the northwestern part of Huron County in Ontario, Canada. It is just east of Goderich.

The Falls Reserve Conservation Area campground and park near Benmiller is operated by the Maitland Valley Conservation Authority. This community was devastated by the F3 tornado that hit Goderich as well as Benmiller in 2011. Benmiller is southeast of Goderich.
