= Canadian federal election results in Midwestern Ontario =

Overview of Canadian federal election results in Midwestern Ontario

Seats obtained by party
Liberal
Conservative
New Democratic
Green
Progressive Conservative (defunct)
Progressive (defunct)

This is page shows results of Canadian federal elections in Midwestern Ontario, which is roughly from Woodstock to Milton, and from Lake Erie to Goderich.

== Regional profile ==
Before the late 1950s, Midwestern Ontario had not leaned towards either the Progressive Conservatives (PCs or Tories) or the Liberals (Grits) on a regular basis as there was wide variation in each party's results from election to election. Since the late 1950s, however, it has been a primarily conservative-voting area. Even when the Liberals won every federal election except one from 1963 to 1980 inclusive, the PCs usually won the majority of seats in this region, and in the 1979 Progressive Conservative election plurality, the only seat the Tories did not win was won by the New Democrats (NDP). The NDP usually claimed one seat from the mid-1960s until the 1993 election, usually in the riding of Brant.

Vote splitting allowed the Liberals to win all of the seats in Midwestern Ontario from 1993 to 2000 in their province-wide sweeps, although they lost Perth—Middlesex to the PCs in a 2003 by-election following the resignation of the outgoing Liberal MP. The Tories' successor, the Conservatives, picked up four more seats in the 2004 election, another in the 2006 election, and four more in 2008, leaving Guelph as the only non-Conservative seat in the region from 2008 to 2015. While the Liberals won a majority government in 2015, the Conservatives still took one more seat in the area than the Grits, as they swept the rural areas. This Conservative dominance persisted into the 2019 and 2021 federal elections, with the party successfully retaining its hold on the region's electoral districts, reflecting Midwestern Ontario's long-standing status as a traditional conservative stronghold.

The Conservatives are weaker in the larger cities of Kitchener-Waterloo and Guelph, partly because they have prominent universities (University of Waterloo, University of Guelph, Wilfrid Laurier University) with large student populations. The Liberals retained three of the four ridings in those cities by significant margins in 2006 despite the Conservatives forming the government, and won four of the five seats there in 2015, the exceptions in both elections being the partially rural Kitchener-Conestoga riding, although both wins in the riding were only narrow victories for the Conservatives. Even in the 2008 Conservative victory, they only won the ridings of Kitchener Centre and Kitchener-Waterloo by less than 300 votes. The riding of the more suburban city of Cambridge has generally leaned Conservative dating back decades, whereas the riding of Brant-Brantford has switched from being strongly NDP to Liberal to Conservative in the last three decades.

In 2019 the Greens were able to gain over 25 percent of the vote in two urban ridings, Guelph and Kitchener Centre. However, the Liberals held both seats by over a 10% margin.

=== Votes by party throughout time ===
Election	Liberal	Conservative	New Democratic	Green	People's	PC	Reform / Alliance	Others
1979	124,330; 31.8%	—N/a	80,974; 20.7%	—N/a	—N/a	183,363; 46.9%	—N/a	1,384; 0.4%
1980	140,929; 36.9%	—N/a	83,939; 22.0%	—N/a	—N/a	153,740; 40.3%	—N/a	1,433; 0.4%
1984	100,631; 24.3%	—N/a	87,464; 21.1%	—N/a	—N/a	222,827; 53.8%	—N/a	2,393; 0.6%
1988	153,232; 33.0%	—N/a	96,563; 20.8%	839; 0.2%	—N/a	194,374; 41.9%	—N/a	18,461; 4.0%
1993	212,043; 43.8%	—N/a	21,955; 4.5%	800; 0.2%	—N/a	104,310; 21.6%	124,870; 25.8%	19,938; 4.1%
1997	216,187; 45.5%	—N/a	45,643; 9.6%	1,026; 0.2%	—N/a	101,694; 21.4%	105,637; 22.2%	5,312; 1.1%
2000	217,501; 47.2%	—N/a	32,066; 7.0%	3,380; 0.7%	—N/a	81,032; 17.6%	122,708; 26.6%	4,061; 0.9%
2004	222,984; 40.9%	192,981; 35.4%	90,876; 16.7%	28,297; 5.2%	—N/a	—N/a	—N/a	8,608; 1.6%
2006	219,204; 36.2%	239,962; 39.6%	104,509; 17.3%	32,716; 5.4%	—N/a	—N/a	—N/a	7,699; 1.3%
2008	160,760; 29.1%	241,777; 43.7%	86,336; 15.6%	53,694; 9.7%	—N/a	—N/a	—N/a	10,120; 1.8%
2011	139,022; 23.4%	297,147; 50.1%	127,208; 21.4%	25,586; 4.3%	—N/a	—N/a	—N/a	4,020; 0.7%
2015	277,292; 40.7%	269,868; 39.6%	98,857; 14.5%	26,758; 3.9%	—N/a	—N/a	—N/a	7,634; 1.1%
2019	248,116; 34.0%	270,733; 37.1%	105,214; 14.4%	85,144; 11.7%	14,732; 2.0%	—N/a	—N/a	3,646; 0.5%
2021	220,914; 31.1%	280,729; 39.5%	116,624; 16.4%	36,620; 5.1%	53,288; 7.5%	—N/a	—N/a	2,029; 0.3%
2025	344,511; 43.8%	370,816; 47.1%	26,271; 3.3%	35,731; 4.5%	5,676; 0.7%	—N/a	—N/a	4,097; 0.5%

Liberal Conservative New Democratic Green People's	Progressive Conservative (defunct) Alliance (defunct) Reform (defunct)

== 2015 ==
Electoral district	Candidates						Incumbent
Electoral district	Conservative	NDP	Liberal	Green	Libertarian	Other	Incumbent
Brantford—Brant	Phil McColeman; 25,874; 40.89%	Marc Laferriere; 15,715; 24.84%	Danielle Takacs; 19,422; 30.70%	Kevin Brandt; 1,582; 2.50%	Rob Ferguson; 515; 0.81%	The Engineer Turmel (Ind.); 164; 0.26%	Phil McColeman; Brant
Cambridge	Gary Goodyear; 20,613; 38.65%	Bobbi Stewart; 7,397; 13.87%	Bryan May; 23,024; 43.17%	Michele Braniff; 1,723; 3.23%		Manuel Couto (M-L); 108 0.20%	Gary Goodyear
Cambridge	Gary Goodyear; 20,613; 38.65%	Bobbi Stewart; 7,397; 13.87%	Bryan May; 23,024; 43.17%	Michele Braniff; 1,723; 3.23%		Lee Sperduti (Ind.); 474 0.89%	Gary Goodyear
Guelph	Gloria Kovach; 18,407; 26.35%	Andrew Seagram; 8,392; 12.01%	Lloyd Longfield; 34,303; 49.10%	Gord Miller; 7,909; 11.32%	Alexander Fekri; 520; 0.74%	Tristan Dineen (Comm.); 144 0.21%	Frank Valeriote†
Guelph	Gloria Kovach; 18,407; 26.35%	Andrew Seagram; 8,392; 12.01%	Lloyd Longfield; 34,303; 49.10%	Gord Miller; 7,909; 11.32%	Alexander Fekri; 520; 0.74%	Kornelis Klevering (Mar.); 193 0.28%	Frank Valeriote†
Haldimand—Norfolk	Diane Finley; 24,714; 44.14%	John Harris; 7,625; 13.62%	Joan Mouland; 20,487; 36.59%	Wayne Ettinger; 1,857; 3.32%		Leslie Bory (Ind.) (Note: Bory is leader of The Maple Party which was ineligible to be on the ballot; he chose to be listed as an Independent.); 151 0.27%	Diane Finley
Haldimand—Norfolk	Diane Finley; 24,714; 44.14%	John Harris; 7,625; 13.62%	Joan Mouland; 20,487; 36.59%	Wayne Ettinger; 1,857; 3.32%		Dave Bylsma (CHP); 884 1.58%	Diane Finley
Haldimand—Norfolk	Diane Finley; 24,714; 44.14%	John Harris; 7,625; 13.62%	Joan Mouland; 20,487; 36.59%	Wayne Ettinger; 1,857; 3.32%		Dustin Wakeford (Ind.); 272 0.49%	Diane Finley
Huron—Bruce	Ben Lobb; 26,174; 44.94%	Gerard Creces; 7,544; 12.95%	Allan Thompson; 23,129; 39.71%	Jutta Splettstoesser; 1,398; 2.40%			Ben Lobb
Kitchener Centre	Stephen Woodworth; 15,872; 30.36%	Susan Cadell; 8,680; 16.60%	Raj Saini; 25,504; 48.78%	Nicholas Wendler; 1,597; 3.05%	Slavko Miladinovic; 515; 0.99%	Julian Ichim (M-L); 112; 0.21%	Stephen Woodworth
Kitchener—Conestoga	Harold Albrecht; 20,649; 43.29%	James Villeneuve; 4,653; 9.75%	Tim Louis; 20,398; 42.76%	Bob Jonkman; 1,314; 2.75%	Richard Hodgson; 685; 1.44%		Harold Albrecht
Kitchener South—Hespeler	Marian Gagné; 17,544; 36.68%	Lorne Bruce; 7,440; 15.56%	Marwan Tabbara; 20,215; 42.27%	David Weber; 1,767; 3.69%	Nathan Lajeunesse; 772; 1.61%	Elaine Baetz (M-L); 91; 0.19%	New District
Oxford	Dave MacKenzie; 25,966; 45.67%	Zoe Kunschner; 9,406; 16.55%	Don McKay; 18,299; 32.19%	Mike Farlow; 2,004; 3.53%		Melody Ann Aldred (CHP); 1,175; 2.07%	Dave MacKenzie
Perth Wellington	John Nater; 22,255; 42.92%	Ethan Rabidoux; 7,756; 14.96%	Stephen McCotter; 19,480; 37.57%	Nicole Ramsdale; 1,347; 2.60%		Irma DeVries (CHP); 794 1.53%	Gary Schellenberger†
Perth Wellington	John Nater; 22,255; 42.92%	Ethan Rabidoux; 7,756; 14.96%	Stephen McCotter; 19,480; 37.57%	Nicole Ramsdale; 1,347; 2.60%		Roger Fuhr (NA); 219 0.42%	Gary Schellenberger†
Waterloo	Peter Braid; 19,318; 32.28%	Diane Freeman; 8,928; 14.92%	Bardish Chagger; 29,752; 49.71%	Richard Walsh; 1,713; 2.86%		Emma Hawley-Yan (Animal All.); 138; 0.23%	Peter Braid; Kitchener—Waterloo
Wellington—Halton Hills	Michael Chong; 32,482; 50.90%	Anne Gajerski-Cauley; 5,321; 8.34%	Don Trant; 23,279; 36.48%	Brent Allan Bouteiller; 2,547; 3.99%		Harvey Edward Anstey (CAP); 183; 0.29%	Michael Chong

== 2011 ==
Electoral district	Candidates					Incumbent
Electoral district	Conservative	Liberal	NDP	Green	Other	Incumbent
Brant	Phil McColeman; 28,045; 48.90%	Lloyd St. Amand; 10,780; 18.80%	Marc Laferriere; 16,351; 28.51%	Nora Fueten; 1,858; 3.24%	Leslie Bory (Ind.); 174 0.30%	Phil McColeman
Brant	Phil McColeman; 28,045; 48.90%	Lloyd St. Amand; 10,780; 18.80%	Marc Laferriere; 16,351; 28.51%	Nora Fueten; 1,858; 3.24%	Martin Sitko (Ind.); 138 0.24%	Phil McColeman
Cambridge	Gary Goodyear; 29,394; 53.40%	Bryan May; 8,285; 15.05%	Susan Galvao; 15,238; 27.68%	Jacques Malette; 1,978; 3.59%	Manuel Couto (M-L); 153; 0.28%	Gary Goodyear
Guelph	Marty Burke; 19,352; 32.79%	Frank Valeriote; 25,588; 43.35%	Bobbi Stewart; 9,880; 16.74%	John Lawson; 3,619; 6.13%	Phillip Bender (Libert.); 192 0.33%	Frank Valeriote
Guelph	Marty Burke; 19,352; 32.79%	Frank Valeriote; 25,588; 43.35%	Bobbi Stewart; 9,880; 16.74%	John Lawson; 3,619; 6.13%	Drew Garvie (Comm.); 104 0.18%	Frank Valeriote
Guelph	Marty Burke; 19,352; 32.79%	Frank Valeriote; 25,588; 43.35%	Bobbi Stewart; 9,880; 16.74%	John Lawson; 3,619; 6.13%	Kornelis Klevering (Mar.); 170 0.29%	Frank Valeriote
Guelph	Marty Burke; 19,352; 32.79%	Frank Valeriote; 25,588; 43.35%	Bobbi Stewart; 9,880; 16.74%	John Lawson; 3,619; 6.13%	Karen Levenson (AAEVP); 116 0.20%	Frank Valeriote
Haldimand—Norfolk	Diane Finley; 25,655; 50.94%	Bob Speller; 12,549; 24.92%	Ian Nichols; 10,062; 19.98%	Anne Faulkner; 1,665; 3.31%	Steven Elgersma (CHP); 435; 0.86%	Diane Finley
Huron—Bruce	Ben Lobb; 29,255; 54.95%	Charlie Bagnato; 8,784; 16.50%	Grant Robertson; 13,493; 25.34%	Eric Shelley; 1,455; 2.73%	Dennis Valenta (Ind.); 254; 0.48%	Ben Lobb
Kitchener Centre	Stephen Woodworth; 21,119; 42.40%	Karen Redman; 15,592; 31.30%	Peter Thurley; 10,742; 21.57%	Byron Williston; 1,972; 3.96%	Mark Corbiere (M-L); 92 0.18%	Stephen Woodworth
Kitchener Centre	Stephen Woodworth; 21,119; 42.40%	Karen Redman; 15,592; 31.30%	Peter Thurley; 10,742; 21.57%	Byron Williston; 1,972; 3.96%	Alan Rimmer (Ind.); 199 0.40%	Stephen Woodworth
Kitchener Centre	Stephen Woodworth; 21,119; 42.40%	Karen Redman; 15,592; 31.30%	Peter Thurley; 10,742; 21.57%	Byron Williston; 1,972; 3.96%	Martin Suter (Comm.); 93 0.19%	Stephen Woodworth
Kitchener—Conestoga	Harold Albrecht; 28,902; 54.12%	Robert Rosehart; 10,653; 19.95%	Lorne Bruce; 11,655; 21.84%	Albert Ashley; 2,184; 4.09%		Harold Albrecht
Kitchener—Waterloo	Peter Braid; 27,039; 40.85%	Andrew Telegdi; 24,895; 37.62%	Bill Brown; 10,606; 16.03%	Cathy MacLellan; 3,148; 4.77%	Julian Ichim (M-L); 66 0.10%	Peter Braid
Kitchener—Waterloo	Peter Braid; 27,039; 40.85%	Andrew Telegdi; 24,895; 37.62%	Bill Brown; 10,606; 16.03%	Cathy MacLellan; 3,148; 4.77%	Steven Bradley Scott (Pirate); 245 0.37%	Peter Braid
Kitchener—Waterloo	Peter Braid; 27,039; 40.85%	Andrew Telegdi; 24,895; 37.62%	Bill Brown; 10,606; 16.03%	Cathy MacLellan; 3,148; 4.77%	Richard Walsh-Bowers (Ind.); 174 0.26%	Peter Braid
Oxford	Dave MacKenzie; 27,973; 58.90%	Tim Lobzun; 4,521; 9.52%	Paul Arsenault; 12,164; 25.61%	Mike Farlow; 2,058; 4.33%	John Markus (CHP); 776; 1.63%	Dave MacKenzie
Perth Wellington	Gary Schellenberger; 25,281; 54.48%	Bob McTavish; 8,341; 17.98%	Ellen Papenburg; 9,861; 21.25%	John Cowling; 2,112; 4.55%	Irma N DeVries (CHP); 806; 1.74%	Gary Schellenberger
Wellington—Halton Hills	Michael Chong; 35,132; 63.70%	Barry Peters; 9,034; 16.38%	Anastasia Zavarella; 7,146; 12.96%	Brent Bouteiller; 3,527; 6.39%	Jeffrey Streutker (CHP); 316; 0.57%	Michael Chong

== 2008 ==
Electoral district	Candidates					Incumbent
Electoral district	Conservative	Liberal	NDP	Green	Other	Incumbent
Brant	Phil McColeman; 22,736; 41.95%	Lloyd St. Amand; 17,943; 33.11%	Brian Van Tilborg; 9,331; 17.22%	Nora Fueten; 3,814; 7.04%	John G. Gots (CHP); 371; 0.68%	Lloyd St. Amand
Cambridge	Gary Goodyear; 24,895; 48.63%	Gord Zeilstra; 11,977; 23.39%	Max Lombardi; 10,044; 19.62%	Scott Cosman; 4,279; 8.36%		Gary Goodyear
Guelph	Gloria Kovach; 17,186; 29.18%	Frank Valeriote; 18,974; 32.22%	Tom King; 9,713; 16.49%	Mike Nagy; 12,454; 21.15%	Philip Bender (Libert.); 159 0.27%	Vacant
Guelph	Gloria Kovach; 17,186; 29.18%	Frank Valeriote; 18,974; 32.22%	Tom King; 9,713; 16.49%	Mike Nagy; 12,454; 21.15%	Manuel Couto (M-L); 29 0.05%	Vacant
Guelph	Gloria Kovach; 17,186; 29.18%	Frank Valeriote; 18,974; 32.22%	Tom King; 9,713; 16.49%	Mike Nagy; 12,454; 21.15%	Drew Garvie (Comm.); 77 0.13%	Vacant
Guelph	Gloria Kovach; 17,186; 29.18%	Frank Valeriote; 18,974; 32.22%	Tom King; 9,713; 16.49%	Mike Nagy; 12,454; 21.15%	Kornelis Klevering (Mar.); 166 0.28%	Vacant
Guelph	Gloria Kovach; 17,186; 29.18%	Frank Valeriote; 18,974; 32.22%	Tom King; 9,713; 16.49%	Mike Nagy; 12,454; 21.15%	Karen Levenson (AAEVP); 73 0.12%	Vacant
Guelph	Gloria Kovach; 17,186; 29.18%	Frank Valeriote; 18,974; 32.22%	Tom King; 9,713; 16.49%	Mike Nagy; 12,454; 21.15%	John Turmel (Ind.); 58 0.10%	Vacant
Haldimand—Norfolk	Diane Finley; 19,657; 40.83%	Eric Hoskins; 15,577; 32.35%	Ian Nichols; 5,549; 11.53%	Stephana Johnston; 2,041; 4.24%	Steven Elgersma (CHP); 501 1.04%	Diane Finley
Haldimand—Norfolk	Diane Finley; 19,657; 40.83%	Eric Hoskins; 15,577; 32.35%	Ian Nichols; 5,549; 11.53%	Stephana Johnston; 2,041; 4.24%	Gary McHale (Ind.); 4,821 10.01%	Diane Finley
Huron—Bruce	Ben Lobb; 22,182; 44.77%	Greg McClinchey; 16,336; 32.97%	Tony McQuail; 7,426; 14.99%	Glen Smith; 2,617; 5.28%	Dave Joslin (CHP); 747 1.51%	Paul Steckle†
Huron—Bruce	Ben Lobb; 22,182; 44.77%	Greg McClinchey; 16,336; 32.97%	Tony McQuail; 7,426; 14.99%	Glen Smith; 2,617; 5.28%	Dennis Valenta (Ind.); 242 0.49%	Paul Steckle†
Kitchener Centre	Stephen Woodworth; 16,480; 36.70%	Karen Redman; 16,141; 35.94%	Oz Cole-Arnal; 8,122; 18.09%	John Bithell; 3,823; 8.51%	Amanda Lamka (Ind.); 215 0.48%	Karen Redman
Kitchener Centre	Stephen Woodworth; 16,480; 36.70%	Karen Redman; 16,141; 35.94%	Oz Cole-Arnal; 8,122; 18.09%	John Bithell; 3,823; 8.51%	Martin Suter (Comm.); 127 0.28%	Karen Redman
Kitchener—Conestoga	Harold Albrecht; 23,525; 49.32%	Orlando Da Silva; 11,876; 24.90%	Rod McNeil; 7,173; 15.04%	Jamie Kropf; 5,124; 10.74%		Harold Albrecht
Kitchener—Waterloo	Peter Braid; 21,830; 36.06%	Andrew Telegdi; 21,813; 36.03%	Cindy Jacobsen; 8,915; 14.73%	Cathy MacLellan; 7,326; 12.10%	Mark Corbiere (Ind.); 107 0.18%	Andrew Telegdi
Kitchener—Waterloo	Peter Braid; 21,830; 36.06%	Andrew Telegdi; 21,813; 36.03%	Cindy Jacobsen; 8,915; 14.73%	Cathy MacLellan; 7,326; 12.10%	Jason Cousineau (Libert.); 333 0.55%	Andrew Telegdi
Kitchener—Waterloo	Peter Braid; 21,830; 36.06%	Andrew Telegdi; 21,813; 36.03%	Cindy Jacobsen; 8,915; 14.73%	Cathy MacLellan; 7,326; 12.10%	Kyle James Huntingdon (CAP); 105 0.17%	Andrew Telegdi
Kitchener—Waterloo	Peter Braid; 21,830; 36.06%	Andrew Telegdi; 21,813; 36.03%	Cindy Jacobsen; 8,915; 14.73%	Cathy MacLellan; 7,326; 12.10%	Ramon Portillo (Comm.); 105 0.17%	Andrew Telegdi
Oxford	Dave MacKenzie; 23,330; 52.68%	Martha Dennis; 8,586; 19.39%	Diane Abbott; 7,982; 18.02%	Cathy Mott; 3,355; 7.58%	Shaun MacDonald (CHP); 1,036; 2.34%	Dave MacKenzie
Perth Wellington	Gary Ralph Schellenberger; 20,765; 48.09%	Sandra Gardiner; 10,225; 23.68%	Kerry McManus; 7,334; 16.98%	John Cowling; 3,874; 8.97%	Irma DeVries (CHP); 898 2.08%	Gary Schellenberger
Perth Wellington	Gary Ralph Schellenberger; 20,765; 48.09%	Sandra Gardiner; 10,225; 23.68%	Kerry McManus; 7,334; 16.98%	John Cowling; 3,874; 8.97%	Julian Ichim (M-L); 84 0.19%	Gary Schellenberger
Wellington— Halton Hills	Michael Chong; 29,191; 57.63%	Bruce Bowser; 11,312; 22.33%	Noel Duignan; 4,747; 9.37%	Brent Bouteiller; 4,987; 9.85%	Jeffrey Streutker (CHP); 414; 0.82%	Michael Chong

== 2006 ==
Electoral district	Candidates						Incumbent
Electoral district	Liberal	Conservative	NDP	Green	Christian Heritage	Other	Incumbent
Brant	Lloyd St. Amand; 22,077; 36.95%	Phil McColeman; 21,495; 35.97%	Lynn Bowering; 12,713; 21.28%	Adam King; 2,729; 4.57%	John H. Wubs; 526; 0.88%	John C. Turmel (Ind.); 213; 0.36%	Lloyd St. Amand
Cambridge	Janko Peric; 19,419; 33.61%	Gary Goodyear; 25,337; 43.85%	Donna Reid; 9,794; 16.95%	Gareth White; 3,017; 5.22%		David M. Pelly (CAP); 217; 0.38%	Gary Goodyear
Guelph	Brenda Chamberlain; 23,662; 38.39%	Brent Barr; 18,342; 29.76%	Phil Allt; 13,561; 22.00%	Mike Nagy; 5,376; 8.72%	Peter Ellis; 538; 0.87%	Manuel Couto (M–L); 45 0.07%	Brenda Chamberlain
Guelph	Brenda Chamberlain; 23,662; 38.39%	Brent Barr; 18,342; 29.76%	Phil Allt; 13,561; 22.00%	Mike Nagy; 5,376; 8.72%	Peter Ellis; 538; 0.87%	Scott Gilbert (Comm.); 111 0.18%	Brenda Chamberlain
Haldimand—Norfolk	Bob Speller; 18,363; 34.29%	Diane Finley; 25,885; 48.33%	Valya Roberts; 6,858; 12.80%	Carolyn Van Nort; 1,894; 3.54%	Steven Elgersma; 559; 1.04%		Diane Finley
Huron—Bruce	Paul Steckle; 21,260; 39.84%	Ben Lobb; 20,289; 38.02%	Grant Robertson; 8,696; 16.30%	Victoria Serda; 1,829; 3.43%	Dave Joslin; 1,019; 1.91%	Dennis Valenta (Ind.); 270; 0.51%	Paul Steckle
Kitchener Centre	Karen Redman; 21,714; 43.26%	Steven Cage; 16,131; 32.14%	Richard Walsh-Bowers; 9,253; 18.43%	Tony Maas; 2,822; 5.62%		Martin Suter (Comm.); 274; 0.55%	Karen Redman
Kitchener—Conestoga	Lynn Myers; 19,246; 38.48%	Harold Glenn Albrecht; 20,615; 41.22%	Len Carter; 7,445; 14.89%	Kristine Yvonne Stapleton; 2,706; 5.41%			Lynn Myers
Kitchener—Waterloo	Andrew Telegdi; 31,136; 46.85%	Ajmer Mandur; 18,817; 28.31%	Edwin Laryea; 11,889; 17.89%	Pauline Richards; 4,298; 6.47%		Julian Ichim (M–L); 144 0.22%	Andrew Telegdi
Kitchener—Waterloo	Andrew Telegdi; 31,136; 46.85%	Ajmer Mandur; 18,817; 28.31%	Edwin Laryea; 11,889; 17.89%	Pauline Richards; 4,298; 6.47%		Ciprian Mihalcea (Ind.); 173 0.26%	Andrew Telegdi
Oxford	Greig Mordue; 13,961; 28.08%	Dave MacKenzie; 23,140; 46.55%	Zoé Kunschner; 8,639; 17.38%	Ronnee Sykes; 1,566; 3.15%	John Markus; 1,434; 2.88%	James Bender (Mar.); 771 1.55%	Dave MacKenzie
Oxford	Greig Mordue; 13,961; 28.08%	Dave MacKenzie; 23,140; 46.55%	Zoé Kunschner; 8,639; 17.38%	Ronnee Sykes; 1,566; 3.15%	John Markus; 1,434; 2.88%	Kaye Sargent (Libert.); 204 0.41%	Dave MacKenzie
Perth Wellington	David Cunningham; 12,301; 25.79%	Gary Schellenberger; 22,004; 46.14%	Keith Dinicol; 8,876; 18.61%	John Day Cowling; 3,117; 6.54%	Irma DeVries; 1,396; 2.93%		Gary Schellenberger
Wellington—Halton Hills	Rod Finnie; 16,065; 29.17%	Michael Chong; 27,907; 50.67%	Noel Paul Duignan; 6,785; 12.32%	Brent Bouteiller; 3,362; 6.10%	Carol Ann Krusky; 606; 1.10%	Mike Wisniewski (Ind.); 355; 0.64%	Michael Chong

== 2004 ==
Electoral district	Candidates						Incumbent
Electoral district	Liberal	Conservative	NDP	Green	Christian Heritage	Other	Incumbent
Brant	Lloyd St. Amand; 20,455; 38.05%	Greg Martin; 17,792; 33.10%	Lynn Bowering; 11,826; 22.00%	Helen-Anne Embry; 2,738; 5.09%	Barra L. Gots; 570; 1.06%	John C. Turmel (Ind.); 373; 0.69%	Jane Stewart†
Cambridge	Janko Peric; 18,899; 36.65%	Gary Goodyear; 19,123; 37.09%	Gary Price; 10,392; 20.15%	Gareth M. White; 2,506; 4.86%	John G. Gots; 395; 0.77%	Alex W. Gryc (Ind.); 114 0.22%	Janko Peric
Cambridge	Janko Peric; 18,899; 36.65%	Gary Goodyear; 19,123; 37.09%	Gary Price; 10,392; 20.15%	Gareth M. White; 2,506; 4.86%	John G. Gots; 395; 0.77%	John Oprea (Ind.); 134 0.26%	Janko Peric
Guelph	Brenda Chamberlain; 23,442; 44.61%	Jon Dearden; 13,721; 26.11%	Phil Allt; 10,527; 20.03%	Mike Nagy; 3,866; 7.36%	Peter Ellis; 634; 1.21%	Manuel Couto (M-L); 66 0.13%	Brenda Chamberlain; Guelph—Wellington
Guelph	Brenda Chamberlain; 23,442; 44.61%	Jon Dearden; 13,721; 26.11%	Phil Allt; 10,527; 20.03%	Mike Nagy; 3,866; 7.36%	Peter Ellis; 634; 1.21%	Lyne Rivard (Mar.); 291 0.55%	Brenda Chamberlain; Guelph—Wellington
Haldimand—Norfolk	Bob Speller; 19,336; 38.84%	Diane Finley; 20,981; 42.15%	Carrie Sinkowski; 7,143; 14.35%	Colin Jones; 1,703; 3.42%	Steven Elgersma; 617; 1.24%		Bob Speller; Haldimand—Norfolk—Brant
Huron—Bruce	Paul Steckle; 25,538; 49.79%	Barb Fisher; 15,930; 31.06%	Grant Robertson; 6,707; 13.08%	Dave Vasey; 1,518; 2.96%	Dave Joslin; 958; 1.87%	Glen Smith (Mar.); 638; 1.24%	Paul Steckle
Kitchener Centre	Karen Redman; 21,264; 47.13%	Thomas Ichim; 12,412; 27.51%	Richard Walsh-Bowers; 8,717; 19.32%	Karol Vesely; 2,450; 5.43%		Mark Corbiere (Ind.); 277; 0.61%	Karen Redman
Kitchener—Conestoga	Lynn Myers; 17,819; 42.29%	Frank Luellau; 14,903; 35.37%	Len Carter; 6,623; 15.72%	Kris Stapleton; 2,793; 6.63%			New district
Kitchener—Waterloo	Andrew Telegdi; 28,015; 48.12%	Steve Strauss; 17,155; 29.47%	Edwin Laryea; 9,267; 15.92%	Pauline Richards; 3,277; 5.63%	Frank Ellis; 379; 0.65%	Ciprian Mihalcea (Ind.); 124; 0.21%	Andrew Telegdi
Oxford	Murray Coulter; 14,011; 30.52%	Dave MacKenzie; 20,606; 44.89%	Zoé Dorcas Kunschner; 6,673; 14.54%	Irene Tietz; 1,951; 4.25%	Leslie Bartley; 1,534; 3.34%	James Bender (Mar.); 794 1.73%	John Finlay†
Oxford	Murray Coulter; 14,011; 30.52%	Dave MacKenzie; 20,606; 44.89%	Zoé Dorcas Kunschner; 6,673; 14.54%	Irene Tietz; 1,951; 4.25%	Leslie Bartley; 1,534; 3.34%	Alex Kreider (CAP); 108 0.24%	John Finlay†
Oxford	Murray Coulter; 14,011; 30.52%	Dave MacKenzie; 20,606; 44.89%	Zoé Dorcas Kunschner; 6,673; 14.54%	Irene Tietz; 1,951; 4.25%	Leslie Bartley; 1,534; 3.34%	Kaye Sargent (Libert.); 226 0.49%	John Finlay†
Perth—Wellington	Brian Innes; 15,032; 33.42%	Gary Schellenberger; 18,879; 41.97%	Robert Roth; 7,027; 15.62%	John Cowling; 2,770; 6.16%	Irma Nicolette Devries; 1,273; 2.83%		Gary Schellenberger (Note: Elected as a Progressive Conservative in a 2002 by-election following the resignation of Liberal MP John Richardson.); Perth—Middlesex
Wellington—Halton Hills	Bruce Hood; 19,173; 38.21%	Mike Chong; 21,479; 42.81%	Noel Duignan; 5,974; 11.91%	Brent Bouteiller; 2,725; 5.43%	Pat Woode; 826; 1.65%		Lynn Myers; Waterloo—Wellington

== 2000 ==
Electoral district	Candidates					Incumbent
Electoral district	Liberal	Canadian Alliance	NDP	PC	Other	Incumbent
Brant	Jane Stewart; 24,068	Chris Cattle; 10,955	Dee Chisholm; 3,126	Stephen Kun; 3,580	931	Jane Stewart
Cambridge	Janko Peric; 22,148	Reg Petersen; 14,915	Pam Wolf; 4,111	John L. Housser; 5,988	370	Janko Peric
Guelph—Wellington	Brenda Chamberlain; 26,440	Max Layton; 11,037	Edward Pickersgill; 5,685	Marie Adsett; 10,188	1,516	Brenda Chamberlain
Haldimand—Norfolk—Brant	Bob Speller; 20,867	Jim Maki; 15,416	Norm Walpole; 2,124	Gary Muntz; 5,761	397	Bob Speller
Huron—Bruce	Paul Steckle; 21,547	Mark Beaven; 10,343	Christine Kemp; 2,669	Ken Kelly; 8,138	474	Paul Steckle
Kitchener Centre	Karen Redman; 23,511	Eloise Jantzi; 11,603	Paul Royston; 3,058	Steven Daniel Gadbois; 6,162	158	Karen Redman
Kitchener—Waterloo	Andrew Telegdi; 27,132	Joshua Doig; 12,402	Richard Walsh-Bowers; 4,394	Brian Bourke; 8,621	1,351	Andrew Telegdi
Oxford	John Baird Finlay; 15,181	Patricia Smith; 11,455	Shawn Rouse; 2,254	Dave MacKenzie; 13,050	763	John Baird Finlay
Perth—Middlesex	John Richardson; 16,988	Garnet McCallum Bloomfield; 9,785	Sam Dinicol; 2,800	Gary Schellenberger; 11,545	958	John Richardson
Waterloo—Wellington	Lynn Myers; 19,619	John Henry Reimer; 14,797	Allan Douglas Strong; 1,845	Michael Chong; 7,999	681	Lynn Myers

== 1997 ==
Electoral district	Candidates					Incumbent
Electoral district	Liberal	Reform	NDP	PC	Other	Incumbent
Brant	Jane Stewart; 24,125	Dan Houssar; 10,436	Pat Franklin; 5,201	Stephen W. Kun; 5,781		Jane Stewart
Cambridge	Janko Peric; 17,673	Bill Donaldson; 10,767	Mike Farnan; 9,813	Larry Olney; 9,299	548	Janko Peric
Guelph—Wellington	Brenda Chamberlain; 25,004	Lyle Mcnair; 9,054	Elaine Rogala; 5,456	Dick Stewart; 11,160	1,707	Brenda Chamberlain
Haldimand—Norfolk—Brant	Bob Speller; 21,043	Ken Gilpin; 12,548	Herman Plas; 2,516	Sharon Hazen; 9,704	437	Bob Speller; Haldimand—Norfolk
Huron—Bruce	Paul Steckle; 24,240	Doug Fines; 9,925	Jan Johnstone; 3,037	Colleen Schenk; 9,223	781	Paul Steckle
Kitchener Centre	Karen Redman; 23,089	Ronald Albert Wilson; 9,550	Lucy Harrison; 4,503	John Henry Reimer; 10,960		John English; Kitchener
Kitchener—Waterloo	Andrew Telegdi; 25,111	Mike Connolly; 10,502	Ted Martin; 4,725	Lynne Woolstencroft; 11,613	678	Andrew Telegdi; Waterloo
Oxford	John Baird Finlay; 16,281	Bill Irvine; 9,533	Martin Donlevy; 3,406	Dave Mackenzie; 14,706	1,329	John Baird Finlay
Perth—Middlesex	John Richardson; 19,583	Garnet McCallum Bloomfield; 9,180	Linda Ham; 3,806	Gary Schellenberger; 11,073	858	John Richardson; Perth—Wellington—Waterloo
Waterloo—Wellington	Lynn Myers; 20,038	Jeff Gerber; 14,142	Mike Cooper; 3,180	Mary Dunlop; 8,175		New district
