= Perth (disambiguation) =

Perth is the capital of Western Australia.

Perth may also refer to:

== Places ==
=== Australia ===
- Perth, Western Australia
  - Perth (suburb), the suburb in which the main central business district is located
  - Perth metropolitan region
  - City of Perth, local government area
  - Division of Perth, federal electoral division
  - Electoral district of Perth, Legislative Assembly electorate
  - Electoral district of Perth (Legislative Council), 1870–1890
  - Greater Perth, statistical area
  - Perth County, Western Australia, a former cadastral unit
- Perth, Tasmania

=== Canada ===
- Perth Parish, New Brunswick, former parish
  - Perth-Andover, former village
- Perth, Ontario
  - Perth County, Ontario
  - Perth (federal electoral district), former federal electoral district
  - Perth (provincial electoral district)

=== New Zealand ===
- Perth River, a river in New Zealand

=== United Kingdom ===
- Perth, Scotland
  - Perthshire, or County of Perth
  - Perth (Commonwealth Parliament constituency), prior to 1707
  - Perth (Parliament of Scotland constituency), prior to 1707
  - Perth (Scottish Parliament constituency)
  - Perth (UK Parliament constituency), 1832–1950 and 1997–2005

=== United States ===
- Perth, Delaware
- Perth, Indiana
- Perth, Kansas
- Perth, Minnesota
- Perth, New York
- Perth, North Dakota
- Perth Township, Walsh County, North Dakota

== Arts and entertainment ==
- Perth (film), 2004 Singaporean film
- "Perth", a song by Bon Iver from the 2011 album Bon Iver
- "Perth", a song by Beirut from the 2015 album No No No

== Military and transportation ==
- Blackburn Perth, a British flying boat
- Perth Regiment, former regiment of the Canadian Army
- HMAS Perth, the name of several ships of the Australian Navy
  - Perth-class destroyer, class of warship used by the Royal Australian Navy
- MV Perth, a historic wooden boat in Western Australia

== People ==
- Earl of Perth, and Duke of Perth, in Scottish peerage
- Tanapon Sukumpantanasan (born 2001), Thai actor nicknamed Perth

== Other uses ==
- 3953 Perth, asteroid
- HM Prison Perth, in Scotland
- Western Australian Herbarium (Index Herbariorum code PERTH)

== See also ==
- Perth Airport (disambiguation)
- Perthshire (disambiguation)
- Perth—Middlesex, a former federal and provincial electoral district in Ontario
- Perth—Wellington (federal electoral district), a federal electoral district in Ontario
- Perth—Wellington (provincial electoral district), a provincial electoral district in Ontario
- Perth—Wellington—Waterloo, a former federal electoral district in Ontario
- Perth and Kinross, Scotland
- Perth Amboy, New Jersey, a city in New Jersey, U.S.
- Perth Basin, a sedimentary basin in Western Australia
- Perth Burghs (UK Parliament constituency), 1708–1832
