= 2014 Perth County municipal elections =

Local election in Ontario, Canada

Elections were held in Perth County, Ontario on October 27, 2014 in conjunction with municipal elections across the province.

== Perth County Council ==
Perth County Council consists of 10 members and uses a weighted voting method so that member's votes match the populations of the constituent communities.

Position	Elected	Weighted votes
Perth East Mayor	Bob McMillan (acclaimed)	2
Perth East Deputy Mayor	Rhonda Ehgoetz (acclaimed)	2
Perth East Councillor	Appointed by Township Council	2
Perth South Mayor	Robert Wilhelm	1
Perth South Deputy Mayor	Appointed by Township Council	1
West Perth Mayor	Walter McKenzie (acclaimed)	2
West Perth Deputy Mayor	Douglas Eidt	2
North Perth Mayor	Julie Behrns (acclaimed)	2
North Perth Deputy Mayor	Doug Kellum	2

== North Perth ==
Mayoral Candidate	Vote	%
Julie Behms (X)	Acclaimed	

== Perth East ==
Mayoral Candidate	Vote	%
Bob McMillan	Acclaimed	

== Perth South ==
Mayoral Candidate	Vote	%
Robert Wilhelm (X)	979	69.73
Roger Fuhr	425	30.27

== West Perth ==
Mayoral Candidate	Vote	%
Walter McKenzie (X)	Acclaimed	
