= By-elections to the 37th Canadian Parliament =

2000–2004 elections for vacant seats

By-elections to the 37th Canadian Parliament were held to fill vacancies in the House of Commons of Canada between the 2000 federal election and the 2004 federal election. The Liberal Party of Canada led a majority government for the entirety of the 37th Canadian Parliament, with little change from by-elections.

Sixteen seats became vacant during the life of the Parliament. Twelve of these vacancies were filled through by-elections, and four seats remained vacant when the 2004 federal election was called.

== Summary ==
Analysis of byelections by turnout and vote share for winning candidate (vs 2000)
Riding and winning party			Turnout		Vote share for winning candidate	
Riding and winning party			%	Change (pp)	%	Change (pp)
Bonavista—Trinity—Conception	█ Liberal	Hold	38.26	-22.94	74.82	20.44
Calgary Southwest	█ Alliance	Hold	23.05	-39.88	71.65	6.84
Gander—Grand Falls	█ PC	Gain	34.76	-16.05	48.49	20.10
Saint Boniface	█ Liberal	Hold	35.42	-28.82	42.82	-9.35
Saint-Léonard—Saint-Michel	█ Liberal	Hold	22.91	-40.74	83.54	6.88
Verdun—Saint-Henri—Saint-Paul—Pointe Saint-Charles	█ Liberal	Hold	25.45	-33.60	63.90	12.63
Windsor West	█ New Democratic	Gain	43.01	-7.03	42.68	26.78
Berthier—Montcalm	█ Bloc Québécois	Hold	28.62	-32.43	50.09	-6.95
Lac-Saint-Jean—Saguenay	█ Bloc Québécois	Hold	35.56	-27.24	48.18	-17.99
Perth—Middlesex	█ PC	Gain	43.97	-17.21	33.77	6.33
Lévis-et-Chutes-de-la-Chaudière	█ Liberal	Gain	23.50	-42.91	55.63	21.51
Témiscamingue	█ Liberal	Gain	29.22	-33.14	57.00	14.25

== Overview ==
By-election	Date	Incumbent	Party	Winner	Party	Cause	Retained
Lévis-et-Chutes-de-la-Chaudière	June 16, 2003	Antoine Dubé	Bloc Québécois	Christian Jobin	Liberal	Resigned to enter provincial politics	No
Témiscamingue	June 16, 2003	Pierre Brien	Bloc Québécois	Gilbert Barrette	Liberal	Resigned to enter provincial politics	No
Perth—Middlesex	May 21, 2003	John Richardson	Liberal	Gary Schellenberger	Progressive Conservative	Resigned	No
Berthier—Montcalm	December 9, 2002	Michel Bellehumeur	Bloc Québécois	Roger Gaudet	Bloc Québécois	Resigned	Yes
Lac-Saint-Jean—Saguenay	December 9, 2002	Stéphan Tremblay	Bloc Québécois	Sébastien Gagnon	Bloc Québécois	Resigned to enter provincial politics	Yes
Calgary Southwest	May 13, 2002	Preston Manning	Canadian Alliance	Stephen Harper	Canadian Alliance	Resigned	Yes
Saint Boniface	May 13, 2002	Ron Duhamel	Liberal	Raymond Simard	Liberal	Appointed to the Senate	Yes
Bonavista—Trinity—Conception	May 13, 2002	Brian Tobin	Liberal	John Efford	Liberal	Resigned	Yes
Gander—Grand Falls	May 13, 2002	George Baker	Liberal	Rex Barnes	Progressive Conservative	Appointed to the Senate	No
Windsor West	May 13, 2002	Herb Gray	Liberal	Brian Masse	New Democratic	Resigned to accept appointment as Chair of the Canadian Section of the International Joint Commission	No
Saint-Léonard—Saint-Michel	May 13, 2002	Alfonso Gagliano	Liberal	Massimo Pacetti	Liberal	Resigned to accept appointment as Ambassador to Denmark	Yes
Verdun—Saint-Henri—Saint-Paul—Pointe Saint-Charles	May 13, 2002	Raymond Lavigne	Liberal	Liza Frulla	Liberal	Appointed to the Senate	Yes

== 2002 ==
Nine federal by-elections were held in 2002.

=== Berthier—Montcalm, Quebec ===
At a cocktail party on May 18, 2002, Michel Bellehumeur, Member of Parliament for Berthier—Montcalm, announced his plan to resign from the House of Commons to run for the Parti Québécois in the provincial riding of Joliette, following the resignation of PQ minister Guy Chevrette.

By-election on Mr. Bellehumeur's resignation, 9 December 2002:
Party	Candidate	Votes	%	±%
Bloc Québécois	Roger Gaudet	13,747		
Liberal	Richard Giroux	11,646		
New Democratic Party	François Rivest	977		
Progressive Conservative	Richard Lafleur	598		
Alliance	Réal Naud	475		

=== Lac-Saint-Jean—Saguenay, Quebec ===
By-election on 9 December 2002 Tremblay's resignation, 7 May 2002
Party	Candidate	Votes
Bloc Québécois	Sébastien Gagnon	8,912
Liberal	Gilbert Tremblay	7,594
Independent	Gilles Lavoie	532
Independent	Richard Harvey	467
Progressive Conservative	Clermont Gauthier	434
Alliance	Alcide Boudreault	290
New Democratic	Yanick Auer	267

=== Calgary Southwest, Alberta ===
Upon his election as leader of the Canadian Alliance, Stephen Harper needed a seat in the House of Commons. Former Reform Party leader Preston Manning resigned his seat to provide a seat for Harper. Harper previously represented the neighbouring riding of Calgary West from 1993–1997, but the seat was already held by MP Rob Anders.

The Liberal Party did not run a candidate against Harper, as a courtesy to allow Harper (as leader of the opposition) to win his seat.

The NDP selected Bill Phipps, a former leader of the United Church, minister and social activist in the city. Phipps challenged Harper's conservative economic and social views. During the campaign, Harper commented he "despise[d]" the cleric , and declined to debate him.

The Green Party chose environmental activist James Kohut, who had previously spoken out in support of the Kyoto Accord and against government subsidies for oil companies, while also calling for lower gas prices for consumers (Calgary Herald, 23 December 2001).

Gordon Barrett, a former candidate for the Social Credit Party of Alberta in Sherwood Park, ran in the riding as an independent.

The leader of the Christian Heritage Party, Ron Gray, was parachuted into the riding in an attempt to win a seat for the CHP in the House of Commons.

==== Results ====
Canadian federal by-election, 13 May 2002
Party	Candidate	Votes	%	±%
On Mr. Manning's resignation, 31 January 2002
Alliance	Stephen Harper	13,200	71.66%	+6.85%
New Democratic	Bill Phipps	3,813	20.70%	+16.74%
Green	James S. Kohut	660	3.58%	
Independent	Gordon Barrett	428	2.32%	
Christian Heritage	Ron Gray	320	1.74%	
Total valid votes		18,421	100.00%	

On election day, Harper won decisively, winning nearly 72% of the vote. Phipps followed a distant second place, with 20% of the vote. Phipps increased the NDPs vote share by nearly seventeen percent, largely due to the lack of a candidate from the Liberal Party.

=== Saint Boniface, Manitoba ===
Canadian federal by-election, 13 May 2002
Party	Candidate	Votes	%	±%
On Mr. Duhamel being called to the Senate, 15 January 2002
Liberal	Raymond Simard	8,862	42.8	-9.3
Alliance	Denis Simard	4,497	21.7	-1.4
Progressive Conservative	Mike Reilly	3,583	17.3	5.7
New Democratic	John Parry	3,106	15.0	+2.0
Marijuana	Chris Buors	435	2.1	
Christian Heritage	Jean-Paul Kabashiki	210	1.0	
Total valid votes		20,693	100.0	

=== Bonavista—Trinity—Conception, Newfoundland and Labrador ===
By-election on 13 May 2002 On Mr. Tobin's resignation, 25 January 2002
Party	Candidate	Votes
Liberal	John Efford	18,665
Progressive Conservative	Michelle Brazil	5,281
New Democratic	Jim Gill	588
Alliance	David Tulett	166
Green	Christopher John Bradshaw	139
Independent	Brent Rockwood	106

=== Gander—Grand Falls, Newfoundland and Labrador ===
By-election on 13 May 2002 On Mr. Baker being called to the Senate, 26 March 2002
Party	Candidate	Votes
Progressive Conservative	Rex Barnes	9,273
Liberal	Beaton Tulk	8,552
New Democratic	John Lannon	873
Alliance	Garry Hartle	422

=== Windsor West, Ontario ===
The Right Honourable Herb Gray had represented the Windsor-Essex area for nearly forty years when he retired in 2002 to accept a job as Canadian Chair of the International Joint Commission. A by-election was scheduled for May 22, 2002.

The incumbent Liberals chose Richard Pollock, a local lawyer and Liberal organizer, having worked on federal and provincial campaigns in Windsor since 1979. He also served on the executive of the Windsor West Provincial Liberal Association, was the area organizer for the Essex Windsor Liberal Association and worked on Jean Chretien's leadership campaign in 1990.

The NDP chose Brian Masse, a municipal politician in Windsor's city council.

The Progressive Conservative Party chose Ian West, who had run against Gray in the previous election. The Canadian Alliance chose Rick Fuschi, an employee in the auto industry.

Chris Holt represented the Green Party and the Christian Heritage Party chose Allan James, a chemical engineer.

==== Results ====
Canadian federal by-election, May 13, 2002: Windsor West
Party	Candidate	Votes	%	±%	Expenditures
New Democratic	Brian Masse	14,021	42.69	+26.79	$65,195
Liberal	Richard Pollock	11,544	35.15	−19.06	$64,964
Alliance	Rick Fuschi	5,420	16.50	−6.45	$60,657
Progressive Conservative	Ian West	957	2.91	−2.62	$11,212
Green	Chris Holt	655	1.99	–	$9,246
Christian Heritage	Allan James	249	0.76	–	$2,072
Total valid votes		32,846	99.39		
Total rejected ballots		200	0.61		
Turnout		33,046	43.01		
Electors on the lists		76,825			
New Democratic Party gain from Liberal					

The NDP, with Brian Masse, increased their vote by over twenty-five percent, becoming the MP for the riding. The incumbent Liberals lost nearly twenty percent of their vote, coming in a distant second place. The Canadian Alliance and Progressive Conservatives also had a reduction in their vote.

=== Saint-Léonard—Saint-Michel, Quebec ===
Canadian federal by-election, 13 May 2002
Party	Candidate	Votes	%	±%
On Mr. Gagliano being named Ambassador to Denmark, 15 January 2002
Liberal	Massimo Pacetti	14,076	83.5	+6.9
Bloc Québécois	Umberto Di Genova	1,495	8.9	-5.6
Progressive Conservative	Antonio Cordeiro	634	3.8	+1.5
New Democratic	Normand Caplette	447	2.7	+1.5
Marijuana	Marc-Boris St-Maurice	197	1.2	-0.2
Total valid votes		16,849	100.0	

=== Verdun—Saint-Henri—Saint-Paul—Pointe-Saint-Charles, Quebec ===
By-election on 13 May 2002 Lavigne appointed to Senate
Party	Candidate	Votes
Liberal	Liza Frulla	10,897	63.9%
Bloc Québécois	Sonia Goulet	4,432	26.0%
Progressive Conservative	Bernard Côté	735	4.3%
New Democratic	Matthew McLauchlin	635	3.7%
Alliance	Joe De Santis	241	1.4%
Independent	Robert Lindblad	113	0.7%

== 2003 ==
Three federal by-elections were held in 2003 to fill vacancies in the House of Commons of Canada. These elections were all held during the 37th Canadian Parliament, but at different dates. One election, in the Ontario riding of Perth—Middlesex, was held on May 21, 2003, while the other two by-elections, in the Quebec ridings of Lévis-et-Chutes-de-la-Chaudière and Témiscamingue, were held on June 16

Three seats were vacant at parliament's dissolution. Ottawa Centre became vacant when Liberal Mac Harb was appointed to the Senate on September 9, 2003; Liberal Jean Chrétien resigned as MP for Saint-Maurice on December 12, 2003 when he retired as prime minister and Liberal Allan Rock resigned his Etobicoke Centre seat on December 12, 2003 upon being appointed Ambassador to the United Nations. These vacancies were filled at the subsequent general election rather than through by-elections.

=== Perth—Middlesex, Ontario ===
In the 2000 election, Liberal John Richardson was re-elected in the riding of Perth—Middlesex, defeating his rival, Progressive Conservative Gary Schellenberger by approximately 5,000 votes. Schellenberger had run against Richardson in 1997, and had received about 25% of the vote. During the 2000 election campaign, rumours about Richardson's health began to come out, specifically after he missed four all-candidates meetings during the election. He barely campaigned in the 1997 election due to what was thought to be a serious medical condition.

Eventually, Richardson resigned his seat on October 11, 2002, citing personal reasons. It would be revealed years later that Richardson suffered from Alzheimer's Disease.

The resulting by-election was scheduled for May 21, 2003. Gary Schellenberger again ran for the Progressive Conservatives, with the NDP choosing their candidate in the 2000 election, Sam DiNicol to run again. The Liberal party chose farmer and educator Brian Innes, while the Canadian Alliance chose businesswoman Marian Meinen. The Leader of the Christian Heritage Party, Ron Gray, was a parachute candidate in the by-election, in an attempt to give his party representation in parliament.

==== Results ====
By-election on May 21, 2003 Resignation of John Richardson
Party	Candidate	Votes	%	±%
Progressive Conservative	Gary Schellenberger	10,413	33.8	+6.4
Liberal	Brian Innes	9,412	30.5	–9.9
Alliance	Marian Meinen	5,400	17.5	–5.8
New Democratic	Sam Dinicol	4,703	15.3	+8.6
Christian Heritage	Ron Gray	902	2.9	+1.0

On election day, Schellenberger defeated Innes by 1,000 votes. The Liberal's loss of the riding to Progressive Conservative candidate Gary Schellenberger was blamed by Prime Minister Jean Chrétien on Richardson's reluctance to leave Canadian politics when his health began deteriorating.

=== Lévis-et-Chutes-de-la-Chaudière, Quebec ===
Antoine Dubé, Bloc Québécois MP since 1993, resigned his seat on March 17, 2003 to run in the 2003 Quebec provincial election as a Parti Québécois candidate in Chutes-de-la-Chaudière. That election, held April 14, 2003, was won by Marc Picard.

Prime Minister Chrétien scheduled this by-election, as well as the Témiscamingue by-election, for June 16, 2003.

The Bloc Québécois chose Maxime Frechette, former parliamentary assistant to Antoine Dubé and former alderman for the city of Saint-Nicolas. The Liberal Party chose accountant Christian Jobin, the NDP chose social worker Louise Foisy from Lévis, the Progressive Conservatives chose law student and security guard Yohan Nolet from Saint-Nicolas, the Green Party chose industrial entrepreneur Yonnel Bonaventure from Quebec City, the Canadian Alliance chose Philippe Bouchard, a designer from Quebec City and the Marijuana Party chose Benjamin Kasapoglu, a salesperson from Quebec City

==== Results ====
Canadian federal by-election, June 16, 2003
Party	Candidate	Votes	%	±%
Liberal	Christian Jobin	13,115	55.6	+21.5
Bloc Québécois	Maxime Fréchette	8,274	35.1	-6.7
New Democratic	Louise Foisy	987	4.2	+2.0
Progressive Conservative	Yohan Nolet	537	2.3	-4.4
Green	Yonnel Bonaventure	254	1.1	
Alliance	Philippe Bouchard	220	0.9	-13.6
Marijuana	Benjamin Kasapoglu	186	0.8	

The results showed a two-way race between the Liberal Party and the Bloc Québécois, with all other parties not breaking over 5% of the vote. The Liberals increased their vote-share by 21.5% and Christian Jobin was elected MP for the riding. The BQ decreased its vote by nearly 7%, while the Canadian Alliance faced a 13.6% decline in results, bringing their candidate down to 6th place out of seven candidates.

=== Témiscamingue, Quebec ===
Pierre Brien of the Bloc Québécois, who, like his colleague Antoine Dubé, was elected in 1993, also decided to run in the 2003 Quebec provincial election. Unlike Dubé, however, Brien decided to run as a member of Action démocratique du Québec. In order to do this, he left the Bloc Québécois to sit as an independent before resigning on March 14, 2003. Brien ran as the ADQ's candidate in Rouyn-Noranda–Témiscamingue, losing to Liberal candidate Daniel Bernard.

==== Results ====
By-election on May 21, 2003 Resignation of Pierre Brien
Party	Candidate	Votes	%	±%
Liberal	Gilbert Barrette	10,195	57.0	+14.3
Bloc Québécois	Sylvain Sauvageau	6,287	35.2	-14.9
Progressive Conservative	Rachel Lord	733	4.1	+2.0
New Democratic	Dennis Shushack	587	3.3	+2.0
Alliance	Clarence Marshall	82	0.5	–3.1

== See also ==
- List of federal by-elections in Canada
