= Carmunnock, Ontario =

Carmunnock
- Hamlet
- Location within Southern Ontario
- Coordinates: 43.6092°N 81.1367°W
- Country: Canada
- Province: Ontario
- County: Perth
- Settled: 1866
- Time zone: UTC-5 (EST)
  - Summer (DST): UTC-4 (EDT)
- Postal Code: N0K

Carmunnock was an early hamlet along the border of Grey, Elma and Logan townships, located on the boundary road west of Monkton, Perth County in southern Ontario.

Carmunnock's origins can be traced back to 1866 when William Machan obtained Lot 24 and 35 in the 18th Concession of Grey Township, Huron County, and erected a sawmill on Lot 35. Machan, who had immigrated from Carmunnock, Scotland, named the hamlet for his native village. The hamlet grew, and at its peak boasted a hotel, combined store, post office and dwelling a two-storey log boarding house, a one-storey log house and two barns. All situated on the west section of the land.

In 1901 Carmunnock listed with a population of about twenty, and the following business given: A. Haffmeyer, shoemaker; H. Jack, cheese manufacturer; Wm. Robertson, blacksmith; F. W. Schnaefer, general shore; and Charles Schneider, Postermaster and General Store. Carmunnock, which was 100 per cent Scottish in the early days, held a community picnic which was a big event in the area.

Two factors account for the demise of this once flourishing village. The hotel was the victim of a fire which destroyed other buildings nearby and William Machan in time moved his sawmill equipment to Monkton as early as 1878.

The first post office was opened in 1875 with Machan as the first postmaster. When he moved his sawmill operation to Monkton, the post office was moved to the home of David Harrison, who lived in the present Bradshaw home on the 15th Concession of Logan.

Today North Logan / Harvey's Cemetery on Line 53 is all that remains of Carmunnock, which is registered to Municipality of West Perth. It is the only public burial ground in Logan Township; the first interment was in 1897.
