= South Perth =

South Perth may refer to:

- South Perth, Western Australia, Australia
  - City of South Perth, local government area
  - Electoral district of South Perth
- Perth South, Ontario, Canada
  - Perth South (federal electoral district)
  - Perth South (provincial electoral district)

== See also ==
- Perth (disambiguation)#Places
