= 2010 Perth County municipal elections =

Local election in Ontario, Canada

Elections were held in Perth County, Ontario on October 25, 2010 in conjunction with municipal elections across the province.

== Perth County Council ==
Position	Elected
Perth East Mayor	Ian J. Forrest
Perth East Deputy Mayor	Bob L. McMillan
Perth East Councillor	Appointed by Council
Perth South Mayor	Robert Wilhelm
Perth South Deputy Mayor	Appointed by Council
West Perth Mayor	Walter McKenzie
West Perth Deputy Mayor	Bill French
North Perth Mayor	Julie Behrns
North Perth Deputy Mayor	Vince Judge
North Perth Councillor	Appointed by Council

== North Perth ==
Mayoral Candidate	Vote	%
Julie Behrns	2,428	
Ed Hollinger (X)	1,097	

== Perth East ==
Mayoral Candidate	Vote	%
Ian J. Forrest (X)	Acclaimed	

== Perth South ==
Mayoral Candidate	Vote	%
Robert Wilhelm	796	
Roger Fuhr	591	

== West Perth ==
Mayoral Candidate	Vote	%
Walter McKenzie	1,575	
Bill Vorstenbosch, Jr.	980	
