= West Perth =

West Perth may refer to:

- West Perth, Ontario, a municipality in Ontario, Canada
- West Perth, Western Australia, a suburb of Perth, Western Australia
- Electoral district of West Perth, a Legislative Assembly electorate in the state of Western Australia
- West Perth Football Club, an Australian rules football club in Western Australia
