= North Perth =

North Perth may refer to the following places:

- North Perth, Ontario, Canada
- North Perth, Western Australia

== See also ==
- Perth North (federal electoral district), former Canadian electoral district
- Perth North (provincial electoral district), former Canadian electoral district
- Perth (disambiguation)#Places
