= Harry Brightwell =

Canadian politician

Member of Parliament for Perth—Wellington—Waterloo (Perth; 1984–1988)
- In office September 4, 1984 – October 25, 1993
- Preceded by: William H. Jarvis
- Succeeded by: John Richardson

Personal details
- Born: Arthur Harry Brightwell; 4 August 1932 (age 93) Matheson, Ontario, Canada
- Party: Progressive Conservative
- Committees: Chairman, Standing Committee on Agriculture; Chairman, Subcommittee on the Tobacco-Growing Industry of the Standing Committee on Agriculture

Arthur Harry Brightwell (born 4 August 1932) was a member of the House of Commons of Canada from 1984 to 1993. He was a veterinarian by career.

Born in Matheson, Ontario, he attended the Ontario Veterinary College in Guelph, Ontario where he graduated in 1956.

He campaigned in the 1984 federal election where he won the Perth electoral district for the Progressive Conservative party. He served there for the 33rd Canadian Parliament.

When riding boundaries were altered in 1987, Brightwell campaigned in the Perth—Wellington—Waterloo electoral district in the following 1988 federal election. He was re-elected, but by a slim two percent margin over Liberal candidate Mike Stinson. After serving in the 34th Canadian Parliament he lost the riding to John Richardson of the Liberal Party in the 1993 federal election.

== Electoral record ==
1993 Canadian federal election: Perth—Wellington—Waterloo
Party	Candidate	Votes	%	±%
Liberal	John Richardson	20,125	43.26	+6.25
Reform	Jeff Gerber	12,185	26.19	–
Progressive Conservative	Harry Brightwell	10,835	23.29	-15.81
New Democratic	Stephanie Levesque	1,909	4.10	-14.88
Christian Heritage	Sid Vander Heide	647	1.39	-2.98
National	Ted Owen	486	1.04	–
Natural Law	Tom Lanier	184	0.40	–
Libertarian	Joe Yundt	152	0.33	-0.21
Total valid votes		46,523	100.0	
Liberal gain from Progressive Conservative		Swing		+11.03
Source(s) "Perth—Wellington—Waterloo, Ontario (1988-1997)". History of Federal Ridings Since 1867. Library of Parliament.

1988 Canadian federal election: Perth—Wellington—Waterloo
Party	Candidate	Votes	%
Progressive Conservative	Harry Brightwell	17,974	39.10
Liberal	Mike Stinson	17,013	37.01
New Democratic	Linda Ham	8,727	18.98
Christian Heritage	Stan Puklicz	2,009	4.37
Libertarian	Joe Yundt	249	0.54
Total valid votes		45,972	100.0
Source(s) "Perth—Wellington—Waterloo, Ontario (1988-1997)". History of Federal Ridings Since 1867. Library of Parliament.
