= Perth—Wellington (federal electoral district) =

Federal electoral district in Ontario, Canada

Coordinates: 43.801°N 80.939°W

Ontario electoral district
- Interactive map of riding boundaries from the 2004 federal election

Federal electoral district
- Legislature: House of Commons
MP
John Nater
Conservative
- District created: 2003
- First contested: 2004
- Last contested: 2021
- District webpage: profile, map

Demographics
- Population (2011): 104,912
- Electors (2015): 75,217
- Area (km²): 3,580.14
- Pop. density (per km²): 29.3
- Census division(s): Perth, Wellington
- Census subdivision(s): Stratford, North Perth, Perth East, Wellington North, Mapleton, Minto, West Perth, St. Marys, Perth South

Perth—Wellington is a federal electoral district in southwestern Ontario, Canada, that has been represented in the House of Commons of Canada since 2004. The riding consists of:

- Perth County including the City of Stratford and the Town of St Marys, and
- the Town of Minto, the Townships of Mapleton and Wellington North in the County of Wellington.

== Demographics ==
Canada census – Perth—Wellington community profile

	2021	2016	2011
Population	113,910 (5.6% from 2016)	107,908 (2.9% from 2011)	104,912 (1.0% from 2006)
Land area	3,580.35 km^{2} (1,382.38 sq mi)	3,580.29 km^{2} (1,382.36 sq mi)	3,580.14 km^{2} (1,382.30 sq mi)
Population density	31.8/km^{2} (82/sq mi)	30.1/km^{2} (78/sq mi)	29.3/km^{2} (76/sq mi)
Median age	41.2 (M: 39.6, F: 42.8)	41.4 (M: 40.1, F: 42.7)	40.5 (M: 39.1, F: 41.8)
Private dwellings	46,562 (total)	43,512 (total)	42,111 (total)
Median household income	$85,000	$70,567	$63,182

Notes: NHS Profile, Statistics Canada
References: 2021 2016 2011

Visible minorities and Aboriginals
Group		2021 Census		2016 Census		2011 Census		2006 Census	
Group		Population	% of total	Population	% of total	Population	% of total	Population	% of total
Aboriginal	First Nations	1,030	0.9	1,020	1.0	1,895	1.9	695	0.7
Aboriginal	Métis	695	0.6	430	0.4	1,895	1.9	695	0.7
Visible Minority		5,420	4.8	3,260	3.1	2,070	2.0	2,085	2.0
All other		104,820	93.7	100,815	95.5	98,800	96.1	101,095	97.3
Total		111,965	100.0	105,525	100.0	102,765	100.0	103,875	100.0

Population by mother tongue
Group	2021 Census		2016 Census		2011 Census		2006 Census	
Group	Population	% of total	Population	% of total	Population	% of total	Population	% of total
English	96,715	86.0	91,725	86.3	89,950	86.9	88,620	86.4
French	605	0.5	565	0.5	645	0.6	615	0.6
English and French	225	0.2	100	0.1	100	0.1	45	0.1
All other	14,910	13.3	13,910	13.1	12,850	12.4	13,245	12.9
Total	112,455	100.0	106,300	100.0	103,545	100.0	102,525	100.0

(Other languages, 2016: 7.8% German, 1.9% Dutch)

Mobility over previous five years
Group	2021 Census		2016 Census		2011 Census		2006 Census	
Group	Population	% of total	Population	% of total	Population	% of total	Population	% of total
At the same address	68,370	65.1	68,030	68.8	67,290	69.9	64,010	66.7
In the same constituency	11,965	11.4	14,725	14.9	14,620	15.2	15,525	16.2
In the same province	22,000	21.0	14,295	14.5	12,880	13.3	14,215	14.8
From another province	1,030	1.0	750	0.8	605	0.6	905	0.9
From another country	1,620	1.5	1,000	1.0	910	1.0	1,330	1.4
Total aged 5 or over	104,985	100.0	98,800	100.0	96,305	100.0	95,980	100.0

== History ==
The riding was created in 2003 from parts of Perth—Middlesex (76%), Waterloo—Wellington (17%) and Dufferin—Peel—Wellington—Grey (7%) ridings. It did not undergo any boundary changes in the 2012 electoral redistribution.

=== Members of Parliament ===
Parliament	Years	Member	Party
Perth—Wellington; Riding created from Dufferin—Peel—Wellington—Grey, Perth—Middlesex and Waterloo—Wellington
38th	2004–2006	Gary Schellenberger	Conservative
39th	2006–2008	Gary Schellenberger	Conservative
40th	2008–2011	Gary Schellenberger	Conservative
41st	2011–2015	Gary Schellenberger	Conservative
42nd	2015–2019	John Nater	Conservative
43rd	2019–2021	John Nater	Conservative
44th	2021–2025	John Nater	Conservative
45th	2025–present	John Nater	Conservative

== Election results ==
Graph of election results in Perth—Wellington (minor parties that never got 2% of the vote or did not run consistently are omitted)

2025 Canadian federal election
** Preliminary results — Not yet official **
Party	Candidate	Votes	%	±%	Expenditures
Conservative	John Nater	33,972	53.00	+4.45	
Liberal	David Mackey	26,150	40.80	+16.19	
New Democratic	Kevin Kruchkywich	2,909	4.54	–12.65	
People's	Wayne Baker	1,069	1.67	–7.97	
Total valid votes/expense limit					
Total rejected ballots					
Turnout		64,100	71.21		
Eligible voters		90,016			
Conservative hold		Swing		–5.87	
Source: Elections Canada

2021 Canadian federal election
Party	Candidate	Votes	%	±%	Expenditures
Conservative	John Nater	26,984	48.6	+2.3	$101,490.94
Liberal	Brendan Knight	13,684	24.7	-2.4	$42,525.50
New Democratic	Kevin Kruchkywich	9,552	17.2	+2.6	$25,291.05
People's	Wayne Baker	5,357	9.5	+7.9	$30,958.13
Total valid votes/expense limit		55,577	99.3	–	$114,372.11
Total rejected ballots		380	0.7		
Turnout		55,957	65.8		
Eligible voters		85,049			
Conservative hold		Swing		+2.4	
Source: Elections Canada

2019 Canadian federal election
Party	Candidate	Votes	%	±%	Expenditures
Conservative	John Nater	25,622	46.34	+3.42	$73,230.45
Liberal	Pirie Mitchell	15,002	27.13	-10.44	$48,553.60
New Democratic	Geoff Krauter	8,094	14.64	-0.32	$19,103.41
Green	Collan Simmons	4,949	8.95	+6.35	none listed
People's	Roger Fuhr	894	1.62	+1.19	$583.54
Christian Heritage	Irma DeVries	733	1.33	-0.21	$9,547.05
Total valid votes		55,294	99.32		
Total rejected ballots		381	0.68	+0.33	
Turnout		55,675	66.68	-1.35	
Eligible voters		83,501			
Conservative hold		Swing		+6.93	
Source: Elections Canada

2015 Canadian federal election
Party	Candidate	Votes	%	±%	Expenditures
Conservative	John Nater	22,255	42.92	-11.56	$125,945.50
Liberal	Stephen McCotter	19,480	37.57	+19.59	$54,799.08
New Democratic	Ethan Rabidoux	7,756	14.96	-6.29	$39,763.84
Green	Nicole Ramsdale	1,347	2.60	-1.95	–
Christian Heritage	Irma DeVries	794	1.53	-0.21	$11,543.38
No Affiliation	Roger Fuhr	219	0.42	–	$28.00
Total valid votes/expense limit		51,851	99.61		$208,635.42
Total rejected ballots		186	0.36	-0.03	
Turnout		52,037	68.03	+4.56	
Eligible voters		76,496			
Conservative hold		Swing		-15.58	
Source: Elections Canada

2011 Canadian federal election
Party	Candidate	Votes	%	±%	Expenditures
Conservative	Gary Schellenberger	25,281	54.5	+6.5	$82,570
New Democratic	Ellen Papenburg	9,861	21.3	+4.3	$17,764
Liberal	Bob McTavish	8,341	18.0	-5.7	$40,957
Green	John Cowling	2,112	4.6	-4.5	$4.790
Christian Heritage	Irma DeVries	806	1.7	-0.4	$8,010
Total valid votes/expense limit		46,401	100.00		$84,700
Total rejected ballots		179	–		
Turnout		46,580	63.5%		
Eligible voters		73,391			
Conservative hold		Swing		+1.1%	

2008 Canadian federal election
Party	Candidate	Votes	%	±%	Expenditures
Conservative	Gary Schellenberger	20,709	48.0	+1.9	$68,139
Liberal	Sandra Gardiner	10,225	23.7	-1.9	$29,238
New Democratic	Kerry McManus	7,234	17.0	-1.8	$23,081
Green	John Cowling	3,884	9.0	+2.5	$13,365
Christian Heritage	Irma DeVries	898	2.1	-0.8	$8,662
Marxist–Leninist	Julian Ichim	98	0.2		
Total valid votes/expense limit		43,048	100.0		$82,152
Conservative hold		Swing		+1.9%	

2006 Canadian federal election
Party	Candidate	Votes	%	±%
Conservative	Gary Schellenberger	22,004	46.1	+4.1
Liberal	David Cunningham	12,301	25.8	-7.6
New Democratic	Keith Dinicol	8,876	18.6	+3.0
Green	John Cowling	3,117	6.5	+0.3
Christian Heritage	Irma DeVries	1,396	2.9	+0.1
Total valid votes		47,694	100.0	
Conservative hold		Swing		+5.9%

2004 Canadian federal election
Party	Candidate	Votes	%
Conservative	Gary Schellenberger	18,879	42.0
Liberal	Brian Innes	15,032	33.4
New Democratic	Robert Roth	7,027	15.6
Green	John Cowling	2,770	6.2
Christian Heritage	Irma Nicolette Devries	1,273	2.8
Total valid votes		44,981	100.0

== See also ==
- List of Canadian electoral districts
- Historical federal electoral districts of Canada
