= John Richardson (Canadian MP) =

Canadian politician

Member of the Canadian Parliament for Perth—Wellington—Waterloo
- In office 1993–1997
- Preceded by: Harry Brightwell
- Succeeded by: Riding Dissolved

Member of the Canadian Parliament for Perth—Middlesex
- In office 1997 – 11 October 2002
- Preceded by: Riding Established
- Succeeded by: Gary Schellenberger

Personal details
- Born: John Alexander Richardson; 1 December 1932 Peterborough, Ontario, Canada
- Died: 2 June 2010 (aged 77) Peterborough, Ontario, Canada
- Party: Liberal
- Profession: Military Officer, Educator

Brigadier General John Alexander "Jack" Richardson (1 December 1932 – 2 June 2010) was a member of the House of Commons of Canada from 1993 to 2002. His career was in education and defence. During his term with the Canadian Forces, he attained the rank of Brigadier General.

He graduated from the University of Ottawa with a Bachelor of Commerce, then from the Ontario Institute for Studies in Education with a Masters of Education. He served with the Canadian Forces from 1952, including a tour of duty in Germany. He eventually reached the rank of Brigadier General as a reservist. In 1961, he joined Norwood Secondary School where he was a teacher and vice-principal and served at other schools, finally reaching Stratford, Ontario where he became superintendent of instruction.

After his retirement from education, Richardson was elected in the 1993 federal election in Perth—Wellington—Waterloo for the Liberal Party, becoming the first Liberal to represent a Perth County-based riding in 40 years. After riding restructuring, he was re-elected at the Perth—Middlesex electoral district in the 1997 and 2000 federal elections.

In all, Richardson served in the 35th and 36th Canadian Parliaments but abruptly resigned 11 October 2002 before completing his term in the 37th Canadian Parliament.

The reasons for his resignation were initially declared to be "personal", but later reports indicated Richardson had been ill for some time. A subsequent by-election loss of Richardson's riding to Progressive Conservative candidate Gary Schellenberger was blamed by Prime Minister Jean Chrétien on Richardson's reluctance to leave Canadian politics when his health began deteriorating.

Richardson died in his birth city of Peterborough, Ontario, on 2 June 2010 after a lengthy battle with Alzheimer's disease.
