= West Perth, Ontario =

West Perth
- Municipality (lower-tier)
- Municipality of West Perth
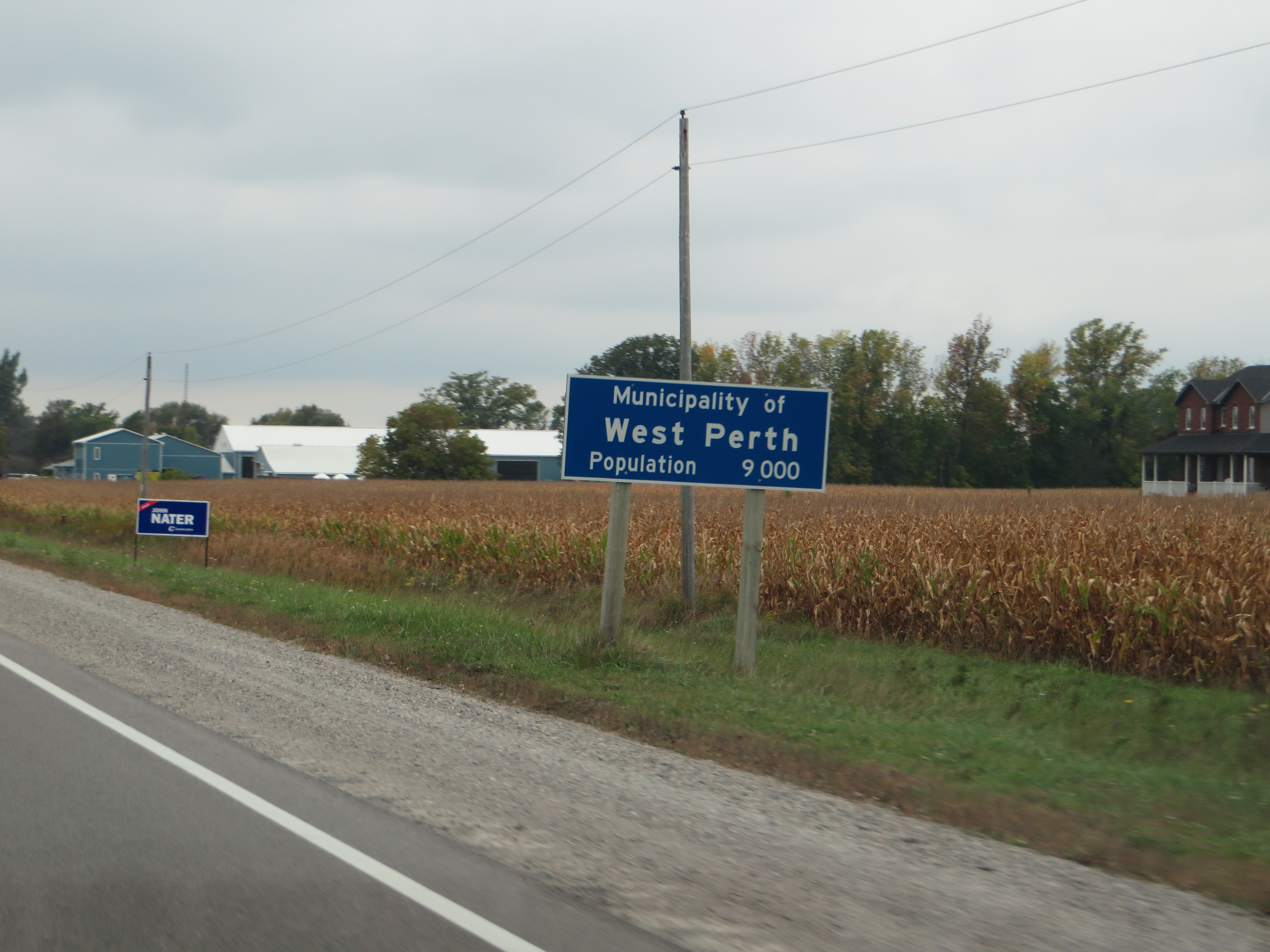

- Location within Perth County Location within Southern Ontario
- Coordinates: 43°28′N 81°12′W
- Country: Canada
- Province: Ontario
- County: Perth
- Formed: January 1, 1998

Government
  - Mayor: Walter McKenzie
  - Federal riding: Perth Wellington
  - Prov. riding: Perth—Wellington

Area
  - Land: 578.88 km^{2} (223.51 sq mi)

Population (2021)
  - Total: 9,038
  - Density: 15.6/km^{2} (40/sq mi)
- Time zone: UTC-5 (EST)
  - Summer (DST): UTC-4 (EDT)
- Postal Code: N0K
- Area codes: 519 and 226
- Website: www.westperth.com

West Perth is a municipality in Ontario, Canada, situated in Western Perth County, west of the city of Stratford. In 2021, its population was 9,038 in a land area of 578.88 square kilometres. The former town of Mitchell and townships of Logan, Hibbert, and Fullarton amalgamated into this single municipality on January 1, 1998. Municipal offices, administration, and services are based in Mitchell. Its mayor is Walter McKenzie.

== History ==
=== Town of Mitchell ===
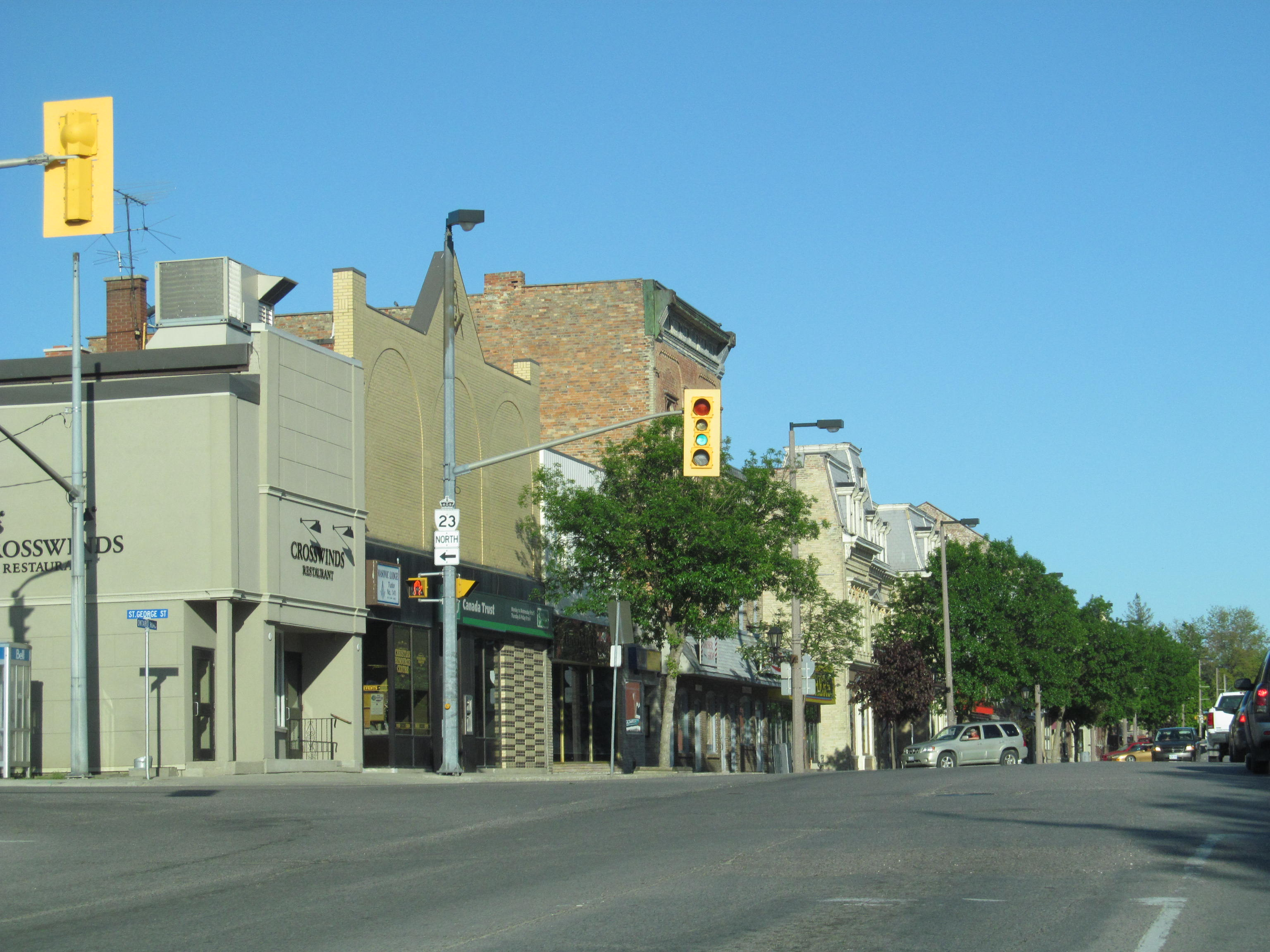
Mitchell, Ontario

According to a historic plaque erected by the Province, the Canada Company laid out a town plot (Mitchell) on the Huron Road in 1836. In 1837 a log building was built by William Hicks along Huron Road; he was the first settler in the area. A sawmill was built in 1842 and in 1845, stores and other mills opened. By 1851 the population had reached 150. Mitchell was incorporated as a Village in 1857 after the railway reached the area. Mitchell became a Town in 1874, with a population of 2000. The first mayor was Thomas Matheson. A waterworks system was completed in 1889; roadways and sidewalks were paved that year. Electricity arrived in 1889. By 1901, the population had grown to 2,200 and in 1918, a large new elementary school was necessary. A high school was built soon after.

=== Logan Township ===
In 1827, Logan Township was named after Hart Logan, a director of the Canada Company. The first settler to Logan township arrived in 1836. It began to grow considerably when British pioneers arrived in the 1850s; a large German population would begin to arrive in 1853 and settle at Brodhagen. A small village formed in Bornholm and a large inn was built there.

=== Hibbert Township ===
This township was named after William Hibbert, a director of the Canada Company. The first settler arrived prior to 1840 and built a tavern. Although the township was slow in settling, the local economy was strong as a result of rich soil, growing industry and access to transportation for marketing the local produce. One room school houses were in operation until the 1960s after which students began bussing to centralized public and separate schools. The ethnic mix in the area includes English, Dutch, Irish and Scottish.

=== Fullarton Township ===
This township was named after John Fullarton, a director of the Canada Company. The first settler, High Kennedy Junck, arrived in 1832 and later opened a sawmill. Subsequent settlers came from Alsace-Lorraine first and later, in the 1840s, from England, Ireland and Scotland arrived. The town was experiencing major growth in the next decade. A full 3,000 people lived in this area by 1870. According to Stratford-Perth Archives records, the booming town was serviced by "seven schools, many churches, and small businesses such as blacksmithies, wagon and harness makers, country stores, a cheese and butter factory, grist and saw mills, and several hotel taverns". Then, as now, this was primarily an agricultural area.

=== Municipal Restructuring ===
As part of provincial initiatives in the late 1990s, the Government of Ontario pursued a policy of municipal amalgamations to rationalize municipal levels of government services and "reduc[e] government entanglement and bureaucracy with an eye to eliminating waste and duplication as well as unfair downloading by the province". On June 26, 1997, an order from the Ontario Minister of Municipal Affairs for the amalgamation of the former Townships of Logan, Hibbert, Fullarton and the Town of Mitchell into the Township of West Perth received Royal assent. The amalgamation came into effect on January 1, 1998.

== Communities ==
Mitchell is the largest community within the municipality. Smaller communities include:

- Bornholm
- Brodhagen - named for German settler Charles Broadhagen who arrived in 1860s
- Dublin - named for hometown of settler Joseph Kidd and was originally known as Carronbrook
- Fullarton - named for John Fullarton Director of Canada Company
- Mitchell
- Russeldale
- St. Columban
- Staffa - named for Scottish island in Inner Hebrides

== Demographics ==
West Perth historical populations
| Year | Pop. | ±% |
|---|---|---|
| 1996 | 8,907 | — |
| 2001 | 9,129 | +2.5% |
| 2006 | 8,839 | −3.2% |
| 2011 | 8,919 | +0.9% |
| 2016 | 8,836 | −0.9% |
| 2021 | 9,038 | +2.3% |

In the 2021 Census of Population conducted by Statistics Canada, West Perth had a population of 9,038 living in 3,434 of its 3,567 total private dwellings, a change of 2% from its 2016 population of 8,865. With a land area of 578.88 km^{2} (223.51 sq mi), it had a population density of 15.6/km^{2} (40.4/sq mi) in 2021.

According to the 2011 census, children aged 9 and under accounted for approximately 13.3% of West Perth's population, while the percentage at retirement age (65 and over) is approximately 15%. The median age is 39 years of age.

According to the 2011 National Household Survey, 6.3% of the population have immigrant status. The most common countries immigrants come from are the Netherlands (34.2%) and the United Kingdom (19.8%).

According to the 2011 National Household Survey, the majority of residents of West Perth are members of a Christian faith and account for 84.6% of the population. The remaining population (11.8%) reports no religious affiliation. Of the Christian population, the largest religious affiliation is Roman Catholic (28.2%) followed by Lutheran (22.6%), United Church (21.4%), Presbyterian (8.9%), Anglican (3.8%), Pentecostal (1.6%), Baptist (0.8%) and other Christian (12.2%).

== Economy ==
According to the 2011 National Household Survey, the largest economic sectors by number of workers employed are manufacturing (800 workers); health care and social assistance (660 workers) and construction (445 workers). Other industries in the region employing more than 200 workers are wholesale trade, retail trade, and transportation and warehousing.

The average income reported in the 2011 National Household Survey was $36,525 with an average after-tax income of $31,711.

West Perth is home to industries that include Cooper Standard Automotive, Armtec Durisol, Parmalat, Sofina and leading Animal Pharmaceutical producer BioAgriMix. The latter company opened about 30 years ago and by 2014 was Canada's largest producer of Animal Pharmaceutical products.

== Government ==
=== Local Government ===
The Municipality of West Perth has a Mayor, Deputy Mayor and nine Councillors. Council positions are held for a four-year term. Councillors represent the wards of Fullarton, Hibbert, Logan and Mitchell.

Township operations are overseen by the Chief Administrator's Office and municipal departments include Building and Zoning Services, By-law enforcement, Finance & Treasury, Fire Service, Garbage/Recycling, and Public Works. The Chief Administrative Officer is Jeff Brick, who started in September 2015.

Township Council 2022-2026

| Position | Name |
|---|---|
| Mayor | Walter McKenzie |
| Deputy Mayor | W. Dean Trentowsky |
| Councillor - Fullarton Ward | Alex Foster |
| Councillor - Fullarton Ward | Steven Herold |
| Councillor - Hibbert Ward | Andrew Fournier |
| Councillor - Hibbert Ward | Nicholas Vink |
| Councillor - Logan Ward | Diane Chessell |
| Councillor - Logan Ward | Ryan Duck |
| Councillor - Mitchell Ward | Doug Feltz |
| Councillor - Mitchell Ward | Phillip O'Donnel |
| Councillor - Mitchell Ward | Murray Rose |

=== County government ===
Because West Perth is part of the upper-tier municipality Perth County, Ontario, it has representation on the County Council. The Perth County Council is determined by a restructuring order that came into force on January 1, 1998. Under this order, the Perth East has two members appointed to the County Council. West Perth Mayor Walter McKenzie and Deputy Mayor Doug Eldt serve as this township's representatives on County Council.

=== Provincial Government ===
Perth—Wellington is a provincial electoral district in Ontario, Canada, that has been represented in the Legislative Assembly of Ontario since the 2007 provincial election. It was created in 2003 from parts of Dufferin—Peel—Wellington—Grey, Perth—Middlesex and Waterloo—Wellington ridings. It consists of the County of Perth, and the Town of Minto and the townships of Mapleton and Wellington North in the County of Wellington. As of October 6, 2011, the MPP for the riding is Randy Pettapiece.

Perth—Wellington
| Assembly | Years | Member | Party |
|---|---|---|---|
Riding created from Dufferin—Peel—Wellington—Grey, Perth—Middlesex and Waterloo—Wellington
| 39th | 2007–2011 | John Wilkinson | Liberal |
| 40th | 2011–2014 | Randy Pettapiece | Progressive Conservative |
| 41st | 2014–2018 | Randy Pettapiece | Progressive Conservative |
| 42nd | 2018–2022 | Randy Pettapiece | Progressive Conservative |

=== Federal Government ===
Perth—Wellington is a federal electoral district in Ontario, Canada, that has been represented in the House of Commons of Canada since 2004. It was created in 2003 from parts of Dufferin—Peel—Wellington—Grey, Perth—Middlesex and Waterloo—Wellington ridings.

It consists of the County of Perth, the City of Stratford, the Town of St. Mary's and the Town of Minto and the townships of Mapleton and Wellington North in the County of Wellington. John Nater, from Logan Township, has been the riding's Member of Parliament since 2015.

| Parliament | Years | Member | Party |
|---|---|---|---|
Perth—Wellington; Riding created from Dufferin—Peel—Wellington—Grey, Perth—Middlesex and Waterloo—Wellington
| 38th | 2004–2006 | Gary Schellenberger | Conservative |
| 39th | 2006–2008 | Gary Schellenberger | Conservative |
| 40th | 2008–2011 | Gary Schellenberger | Conservative |
| 41st | 2011–2015 | Gary Schellenberger | Conservative |
| 42nd | 2015–present | John Nater | Conservative |

== See also ==
- List of townships in Ontario
- Perth County, Ontario
