= Perth Airport (disambiguation) =

Perth Airport is a domestic and international airport serving Perth, Western Australia.

Perth Airport may also refer to:

- Perth Airport (Scotland), serving Perth, Scotland
- Perth Airport (suburb), a suburb of Perth, Western Australia
