= Perthshire (disambiguation) =

Perthshire is a historic county and registration county in central Scotland.

Perthshire may also refer to:

== Scotland ==
- Perth and Kinross, a council area of Scotland, originating in 1929 as a merger of the administrative counties of Perthshire and Kinross-shire
- Perthshire (UK Parliament constituency), a constituency from 1708 to 1885
- Perthshire (Parliament of Scotland constituency), a constituency before 1708

== Elsewhere ==
- Perthshire, Mississippi, an unincorporated community in Bolivar County
- City of Stirling, Western Australia, formerly the Shire of Perth
