= Perth South, Ontario =

Township in Ontario, Canada

Perth South
- Township (lower-tier)
- Township of Perth South
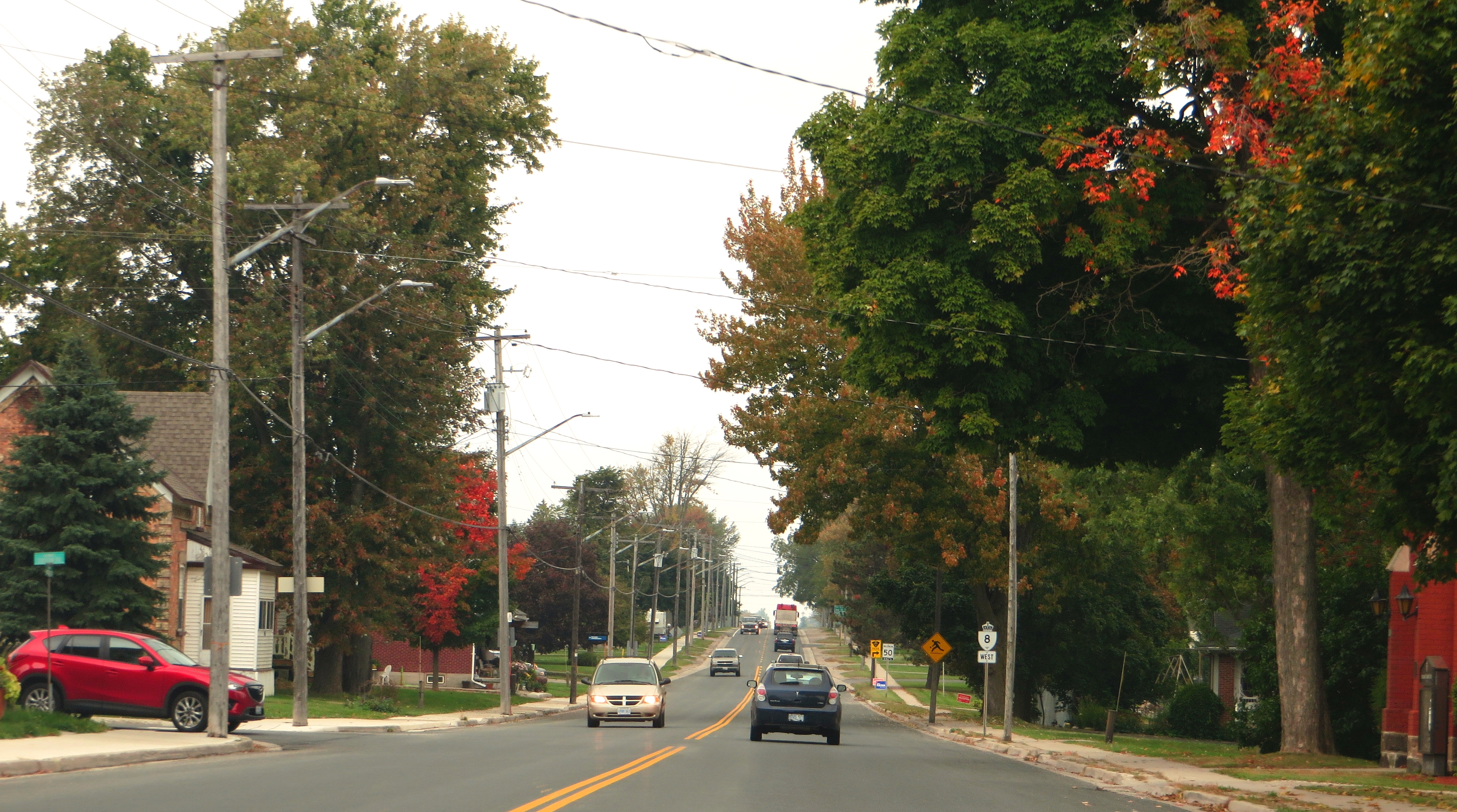
- Sebringville

- Nickname: "Ontario's Food Basket"
- Location within Perth County Location within Southern Ontario
- Coordinates: 43°18′N 81°09′W
- Country: Canada
- Province: Ontario
- County: Perth
- Formed: January 1, 1998

Government
  - Mayor: Jim Aitcheson
  - Federal riding: Perth Wellington
  - Prov. riding: Perth—Wellington

Area
  - Land: 393.14 km^{2} (151.79 sq mi)

Population (2016)
  - Total: 3,810
  - Density: 9.7/km^{2} (25/sq mi)
- Time zone: UTC-5 (EST)
  - Summer (DST): UTC-4 (EDT)
- Postal Code: N0K
- Area codes: 519, 226, 548
- Website: www.perthsouth.ca

The Township of Perth South is a lower-tier municipality in southwestern Ontario, Canada. It is in Perth County at the confluence of the Thames and Avon rivers. The township was created on January 1, 1998, from the amalgamation of the former Township of Blanshard and the former Township of Downie. The land area of Perth South is 393.14 square kilometers. The population in 2016 was 3,810.

Canada's ninth Prime Minister, Arthur Meighen, was born in Anderson, a community in Perth South.

== Communities ==
The township encompasses the Villages of Sebringville and Kirkton. There are smaller settlement areas known as Hamlets that include: Avonbank, Avonton, Conroy, Harmony, Prospect Hill, Rannoch, St. Pauls, Whalen Corners and Woodham.

The township is composed predominantly of a mix of rural agricultural land and hamlet residential uses with a total land area of 39,202 hectares. The 2016 population was 3,810 persons in a land ara of 393.14 square kilometers. Agricultural uses represent one of the township's most significant economic and cultural assets.

== Economy ==
Perth South is served by the Stratford & District Chamber of Commerce whose mandate is to maintain and improve trade and commerce and to provide the economic, commercial, tourist, agricultural, and environmental welfare of the region. Perth South is also a part of the Southwest Economic Alliance, an organization covering much of southwestern Ontario and designed to create partnerships between local government, educational institutions, the broader public sector, and the private sector.

According to the 2011 National Household Survey, the largest economic sectors by number employed are manufacturing (430 workers); agriculture, forestry, fishing, and hunting (395 workers); construction (250 workers); and health care and social assistance (180 workers). Other industries employing 100 or more workers include wholesale trade; retail trade; finance and insurance; educational services; and health care and social assistance.

All of Perth County is an agricultural area; mixed farming is the primary category while pork production is second. Food processing industries operate here, with 20 such companies (2012). Other businesses in Perth South include Maple Leaf Foods, Klomps Nursery, McCully's Hill Farms, C’est Bon Cheese, McLean Taylor Construction, and Hoffmeyers Mill. There are also smaller companies that make products such cheeses and biofuels.

== Demographics ==
Historical population
Year	Pop.	±%
1996	4,343	—
2001	4,299	−1.0%
2006	4,132	−3.9%
2011	3,993	−3.4%
2016	3,810	−4.6%
Source: Canada 1996 Census, Canada 2001 Census 2006 Census of Canada 2011 Census of Canada

In the 2021 Census of Population conducted by Statistics Canada, Perth South had a population of 3,776 living in 1,396 of its 1,454 total private dwellings, a change of −0.8% from its 2016 population of 3,805. With a land area of 391.88 km^{2} (151.31 sq mi), it had a population density of 9.6/km^{2} (25.0/sq mi) in 2021.

Children aged 9 and under account for approximately 10% of the population, while the percentage at retirement age (65 and over) is approximately 12%. The median age is 41.7 years of age.

According to the 2011 National Household Survey, only 6% of the population have immigrant status. The most common countries immigrants come from are the Netherlands (36%) followed by the United Kingdom (15%) and Germany (13%).

The Survey indicated that the majority of residents of Perth South are members of a Christian faith and account for 81.6% of the population with the remaining population reporting no religious affiliation. Of the religious population, the largest religious affiliation is Roman Catholic (27.7%) followed by United Church (21.4%), Presbyterian (18.8%), Lutheran (10.4%), Anglican (0.5%), and other Christian (13.9%).

== Government ==
=== Local government ===
Perth South is governed by a Township Council composed of seven members, including a mayor and deputy mayor. Council positions are held for a four-year term.

The township's services include public works, building and bylaw enforcement, recreation and leisure, drainage, environmental, planning, fire, economic development, and emergency management. Police services were provided by the Ontario Provincial Police from the Perth headquarters in Sebringville, Ontario until November 5, 2018, when Stratford Police Service assumed responsibility.

==== Township Council 2018–2022 ====
Position	Name
Mayor	Robert Wilhelm
Deputy Mayor	James Aitcheson
Councillor	Sam Corriveau
Councillor	Bill Jeffrey
Councillor	Melinda Zurbrigg
Councillor	Jaime Martin
Councillor	Sue Orr

==== Perth County Council ====
The township also has representation on the Perth County Council, with two members. That Council is made up of representatives from the four Perth Townships. The head of County Council is elected from among the council members annually, by a vote at council and is known as the Warden. or 2018–2019, the Perth County Warden is Walter McKenzie. The 2018–2022 Perth County Council includes Robert Wilhelm and James Aitcheson from Perth South.

=== Provincial Government ===
Perth—Wellington is a provincial electoral district in Ontario, Canada, that has been represented in the Legislative Assembly of Ontario since the 2007 provincial election. It was created in 2003 from parts of Dufferin—Peel—Wellington—Grey, Perth—Middlesex and Waterloo—Wellington ridings.

It consists of the County of Perth, and the Town of Minto and the townships of Mapleton and Wellington North in the County of Wellington. Since 2014, the MPP for the riding has been Randy Pettapiece (PC).

Perth—Wellington
Assembly	Years	Member	Party
Riding created from Dufferin—Peel—Wellington—Grey, Perth—Middlesex and Waterloo—Wellington
39th	2007–2011	John Wilkinson	Liberal
40th	2011–2014	Randy Pettapiece	Progressive Conservative
41st	2014–2018	Randy Pettapiece	Progressive Conservative
42nd	2018–present	Randy Pettapiece	Progressive Conservative

=== Federal Government ===
Perth—Wellington is a federal electoral district in Ontario, Canada, that has been represented in the House of Commons of Canada since 2004. The riding was created in 2003 from parts of Perth—Middlesex (76%), Waterloo—Wellington (17%) and Dufferin—Peel—Wellington—Grey (7%) ridings. It did not undergo any boundary changes in the 2012 electoral redistribution.

It consists of the County of Perth, the City of Stratford, the Town of St. Mary's and the Town of Minto and the townships of Mapleton and Wellington North in the County of Wellington.

Since 2015, the MP for this riding has been John Nater (PC).

== See also ==
- List of townships in Ontario
- Perth County, Ontario
