= John Nater =

Canadian politician (born 1984)

John Nater MP
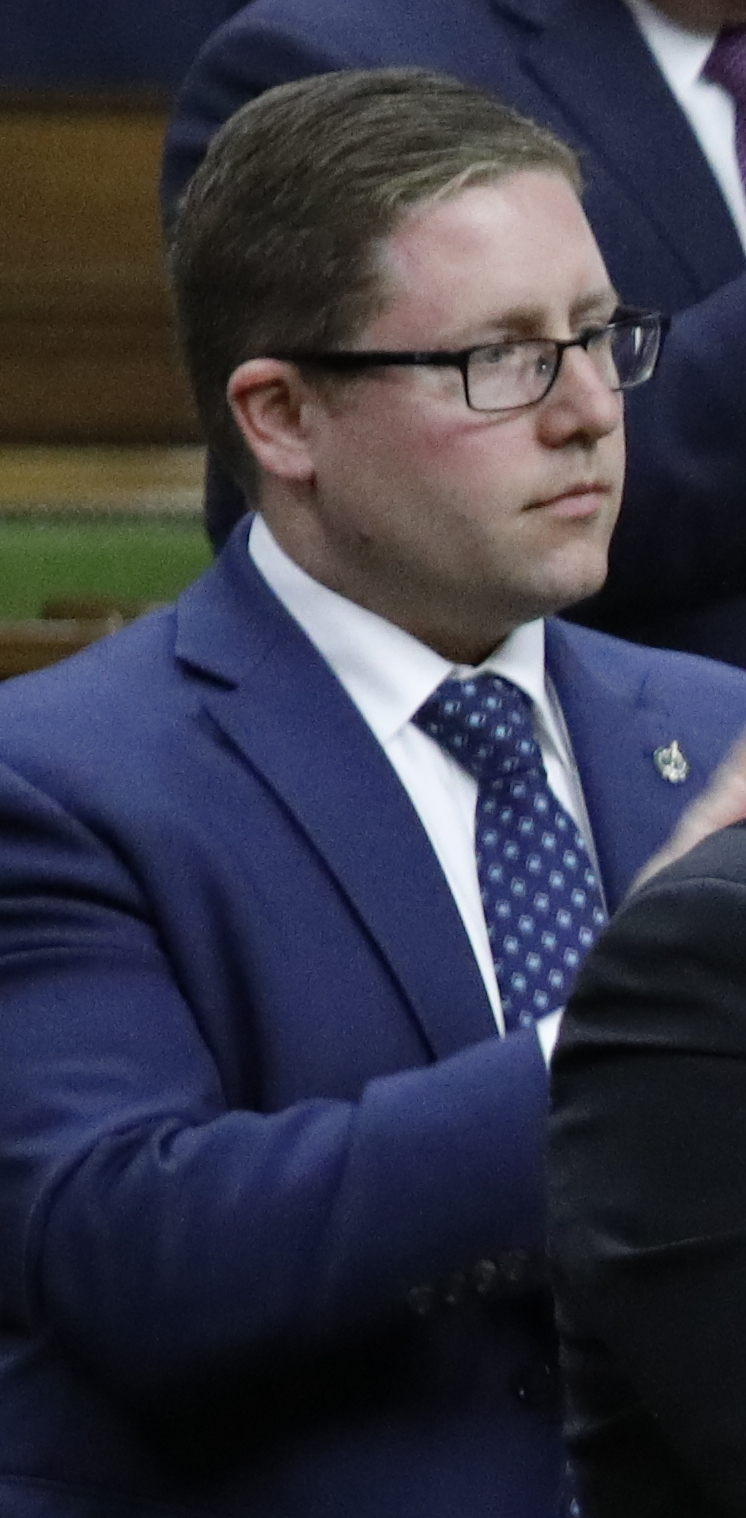
- Nater in 2020

Member of Parliament for Perth—Wellington
- Incumbent
- Assumed office October 19, 2015
- Preceded by: Gary Schellenberger

West Perth Municipal Councillor
- In office December 1, 2010 – December 1, 2014
- Constituency: Mitchell Ward

Personal details
- Born: February 14, 1984 (age 42) Stratford, Ontario
- Party: Conservative
- Spouse: Justine Nater (m. 2013)
- Children: 3
- Education: Carleton University (2007); Queen's University (2008)

John Nater MP (born February 14, 1984) is a Canadian politician. He is currently serving as the Member of Parliament for the riding of Perth Wellington in the House of Commons of Canada.

== Education and early life ==
Nater was born in Stratford, Ontario, and grew up in Logan Township (now part of the Township of West Perth), where he was raised on a family pig farm. While attending Carleton University, he worked as a volunteer intern for MP Gary Schellenberger, and later became his special assistant. He later became an executive assistant to MPP Randy Pettapiece. He also worked as a grievance analyst with the Correctional Service of Canada and policy analyst at the Treasury Board of Canada.

Nater became interested in legislative politics at a young age. At age 14 he purchased 160 bound copies of Ontario Hansard from former Perth MPP Hugh Edighoffer at an auction sale.

Nater earned degrees as a Bachelor of Public Affairs and Policy Management from Carleton in 2007, as well as a Master of Public Administration from Queen's University in 2008. From 2012 to 2014, he was a lecturer at King's University College. When nominated to run for MP in November 2014, he had been a PhD candidate at Western University in political science.

== Municipal politics ==
In the 2010 Ontario municipal election, Nater was elected to the West Perth council as a representative for the Mitchell Ward. During his time on municipal council Nater served as chair of the Environmental Services Committee. In 2014 the committee began a project to build a new water tower in Mitchell.

He did not run for re-election in the subsequent municipal election, as he planned to seek the Conservative nomination for Perth—Wellington, vacated due to the impending retirement of long-serving MP Gary Schellenberger.

== Federal politics ==
=== 2015 election ===
Nater won the nomination, and was elected in the 2015 Canadian federal election with 22,255 votes (42.9%).

=== 42nd Canadian Parliament ===
From February 17, 2016, to September 18, 2017, Nater served as Vice Chair of the Canadian House of Commons Standing Committee on Official Languages. During this time he was critical of the Liberal Government's decision to nominate Madeleine Meilleur as Official Languages Commissioner. Nater frequently called the nomination partisan and questioned the Liberal Government's appointments process.

During the 42nd Canadian Parliament, Nater earned a reputation as an expert on parliamentary procedure.

On March 23, 2017, Nater made an intervention in the House of Commons on the Question of Privilege raised a day earlier by his Conservative colleague Lisa Raitt. Nater argued there was sufficient grounds for a prima facie question of privilege. On April 6, Speaker Geoff Regan ruled there was. However, during debate on the motion following the ruling the Liberal MP Alexandra Mendès moved a motion to proceed to orders of the day, ending the debate and with it the opportunity to address a violation of Members' rights.

On April 7, 2017, Nater made another intervention asking the Speaker to revive the previous motion. Citing extensively from previous speakers rulings and the rules of parliamentary procedure Nater argued that the Government's motion to move to orders of the day during a debate on a motion of privilege "is an extremely dangerous precedent that denies members their fundamental right to vote"

On April 11, 2017, Regan ruled in favour of Nater and invited him to once again move a motion to refer the issue to the Canadian House of Commons Standing Committee on Procedure and House Affairs.

On August 30, 2017, Official Opposition leader Andrew Scheer named Nater to be Shadow Minister for Interprovincial Trade and the Sharing Economy.

On September 19, 2017, Nater became a member of the Standing Committee on Procedure and House Affairs.

On January 28, 2019, Nater introduced a bill to amend the Criminal Code of Canada. Inspired by a criminal incident in Stratford, the intention of the bill was to better protect young people and people with disabilities from sexual exploitation.

=== 2019 election ===
In the 2019 Canadian federal election Nater was re-elected with 25,622 votes, finishing more than 10,000 votes ahead of the second-placed Liberal candidate.

=== 43rd Canadian Parliament ===
From November 28, 2019, Conservative Party leader Andrew Scheer appointed Nater the Official Opposition Deputy House Leader to work under Opposition House Leader Candice Bergen. Nater held the position until September 2, 2020 when new leader Erin O'Toole replaced him with Karen Vecchio.

On September 8, 2020, O'Toole named Nater to be Shadow Minister for Rural Economic Development. During this time Nater was actively critical of the Liberal record on rural internet service.

In late 2020 Nater opposed the potential construction of a factory by the Chinese company Xinyi Glass . Nater cited the loss of farmland, environmental damage, and the continued crackdown by Beijing on pro-democracy protesters in Hong Kong as his reasons for opposing the construction. The plans for the factory with withdrawn in early 2021.

=== 2021 election ===
Nater won his second re-election campaign in the 2021 Canadian federal election, again increasing his share of the vote.

=== 44th Canadian Parliament ===
On November 9, 2021, Nater was named Shadow Minister for Canadian Heritage. During this time Nater was critical of the Liberal Government's Online Streaming Act. Nater was also involved in the Heritage Committee work on the Hockey Canada sexual assault scandal.

During the 2022 Conservative Party of Canada leadership election, Nater endorsed Jean Charest, former premier of Quebec and cabinet minister during the premierships of Brian Mulroney and Kim Campbell, and was among four Conservative MPs to sign an open letter asking Charest to run. In the contest Charest came second to Pierre Poilievre. On October 12, 2022, when Poilievre named his new shadow cabinet, Nater was not included.

In October 2022, Nater returned to the Standing Committee on Procedure and House Affairs and was elected Vice Chair. He was involved in the committee hearings on Chinese government interference in the 2019 and 2021 Canadian federal elections and the 2022 Canadian federal electoral redistribution.

In September 2023 Nater moved to Canadian House of Commons Standing Committee on Public Accounts. During this time he focused on reviewing reports of the Auditor General of Canada including the critical ArriveCAN report.

From March 2022 to May 2023, Nater worked with Ontario Senator Robert Black to pass Bill S-227, the Food Day Canada Act, in honour of Wellington County food activist Anita Stewart

=== 2025 election ===
Nater won his second re-election campaign in the 2025 Canadian federal election, increasing his share of the vote for the third consecutive election despite a resurgent Liberal Party vote.

=== 45th Canadian Parliament ===
On May 29, 2025 Members of the House of Commons unanimously selected Nater to be Assistant Deputy Speaker and Assistant Deputy Chair of Committee of the Whole succeeding Carol Hughes of the New Democratic Party of Canada who did not seek re-election to the House of Commons.

== Electoral record ==
2025 Canadian federal election: Perth—Wellington
** Preliminary results — Not yet official **
Party	Candidate	Votes	%	±%	Expenditures
Conservative	John Nater	33,972	53.00	+4.45	
Liberal	David Mackey	26,150	40.80	+16.19	
New Democratic	Kevin Kruchkywich	2,909	4.54	–12.65	
People's	Wayne Baker	1,069	1.67	–7.97	
Total valid votes/expense limit					
Total rejected ballots					
Turnout		64,100	71.21		
Eligible voters		90,016			
Conservative hold		Swing		–5.87	
Source: Elections Canada

2021 Canadian federal election
Party	Candidate	Votes	%	±%
Conservative	John Nater	26,984	48.6	+2.3
Liberal	Brendan Knight	13,684	24.7	-2.4
New Democratic	Kevin Kruchkywich	9,552	17.2	+2.6
People's	Wayne Baker	5,357	9.5	+7.9
Total valid votes		55,577	99.3	
Total rejected ballots		380	0.7	
Turnout		55,957	65.8	
Eligible voters		85,049		
Conservative hold		Swing		+2.4
Source: Elections Canada

2019 Canadian federal election: Perth—Wellington
Party	Candidate	Votes	%	±%	Expenditures
Conservative	John Nater	25,622	46.34	+3.42	$73,230.45
Liberal	Pirie Mitchell	15,002	27.13	-10.44	$48,553.60
New Democratic	Geoff Krauter	8,094	14.64	-0.32	$19,103.41
Green	Collan Simmons	4,949	8.95	+6.35	none listed
People's	Roger Fuhr	894	1.62	+1.19	$583.54
Christian Heritage	Irma DeVries	733	1.33	-0.21	$9,547.05
Total valid votes		55,294	99.32		
Total rejected ballots		381	0.68	+0.33	
Turnout		55,675	66.68	-1.35	
Eligible voters		83,501			
Conservative hold		Swing		+6.93	
Source: Elections Canada

2015 Canadian federal election: Perth—Wellington
Party	Candidate	Votes	%	±%
Conservative	John Nater	22,255	42.9	-11.5
Liberal	Stephen McCotter	19,480	37.6	+19.5
New Democratic	Ethan Rabidoux	7,756	15.0	-6.3
Green	Nicole Ramsdale	1,347	2.6	-2.0
Christian Heritage	Irma DeVries	794	1.5	-0.2
No affiliation	Roger Fuhr	219	0.4	–
Total valid votes		51,789	100.0	
Total rejected ballots		–	–	
Turnout		51,789	68.1%	+4.6%
Eligible voters		76,097		
Conservative hold		Swing		-15.5%
Source: Elections Canada
