= Perth—Wellington—Waterloo =

Former federal electoral district in Ontario, Canada

Coordinates: 43.489°N 80.893°W

Ontario electoral district

Defunct federal electoral district
- Legislature: House of Commons
- District created: 1987
- District abolished: 1996
- First contested: 1988
- Last contested: 1993

Perth—Wellington—Waterloo was a federal electoral district represented in the House of Commons of Canada from 1988 to 1997. It was located in the province of Ontario. This riding was created in 1987 from parts of Perth, Waterloo and Wellington—Dufferin—Simcoe ridings.

The riding consisted of the County of Perth, the townships of Wellesley and Wilmot in the Regional Municipality of Waterloo, and the Village of Drayton and the townships of Maryborough and Peel in the County of Wellington.

It was abolished in 1996 when it was re-distributed between Perth—Middlesex and Waterloo—Wellington ridings.

== Members of Parliament ==
| Parliament | Years | Member | Party |
|---|---|---|---|
Riding created from Perth, Waterloo and Wellington—Dufferin—Simcoe
| 34th | 1988–1993 | Harry Brightwell | Progressive Conservative |
| 35th | 1993–1997 | John Richardson | Liberal |
Riding dissolved into Perth—Middlesex and Waterloo—Wellington

== Electoral history ==
1988 Canadian federal election
| Party | Candidate | Votes | % |
|---|---|---|---|
| Progressive Conservative | Harry Brightwell | 17,974 | 39.10 |
| Liberal | Mike Stinson | 17,013 | 37.01 |
| New Democratic | Linda Ham | 8,727 | 18.98 |
| Christian Heritage | Stan Puklicz | 2,009 | 4.37 |
| Libertarian | Joe Yundt | 249 | 0.54 |
| Total valid votes | | 45,972 | 100.0 |
Source(s) "Perth—Wellington—Waterloo, Ontario (1988-1997)". History of Federal Ridings Since 1867. Library of Parliament.

1993 Canadian federal election
| Party | Candidate | Votes | % | ±% |
|---|---|---|---|---|
| Liberal | John Richardson | 20,125 | 43.26 | +6.25 |
| Reform | Jeff Gerber | 12,185 | 26.19 | – |
| Progressive Conservative | Harry Brightwell | 10,835 | 23.29 | -15.81 |
| New Democratic | Stephanie Levesque | 1,909 | 4.10 | -14.88 |
| Christian Heritage | Sid Vander Heide | 647 | 1.39 | -2.98 |
| National | Ted Owen | 486 | 1.04 | – |
| Natural Law | Tom Lanier | 184 | 0.40 | – |
| Libertarian | Joe Yundt | 152 | 0.33 | -0.21 |
| Total valid votes | | 46,523 | 100.0 | |
| Liberal gain from Progressive Conservative | | Swing | | +11.03 |
Source(s) "Perth—Wellington—Waterloo, Ontario (1988-1997)". History of Federal Ridings Since 1867. Library of Parliament.

== See also ==
- List of Canadian electoral districts
- Historical federal electoral districts of Canada
