= Waterloo—Wellington =

Former federal electoral district in Ontario, Canada

Ontario electoral district

Defunct federal electoral district
- Legislature: House of Commons
- District created: 1996
- District abolished: 2003
- First contested: 1997
- Last contested: 2000

Demographics
- Population (2001): 119,469
- Electors (2002): 77,610
- Area (km²): 2,622
- Census division(s): Waterloo, Wellington
- Census subdivision(s): Elora, Fergus, Maryborough, Nichol, Peel, West Garfaxa, Wellesley, Wilmot, Woolwich, Kitchener

Waterloo—Wellington was a federal electoral district represented in the House of Commons of Canada from 1997 to 2003. It continued to be a provincial electoral district represented in the Legislative Assembly of Ontario until the 2007 provincial election.

Waterloo—Wellington was located in the province of Ontario.

Waterloo—Wellington federal riding was created in 1996 from parts of Guelph—Wellington, Kitchener, Perth—Wellington—Waterloo, Waterloo and Wellington—Grey—Dufferin—Simcoe ridings. It was abolished in 2003, and divided between Cambridge, Kitchener—Conestoga, Perth Wellington and Wellington—Halton Hills ridings.

Waterloo—Wellington consisted of the southwest part of the City of Kitchener, the townships of Wilmot, Wellesley and Woolwich, the northwest part of the County of Wellington excluding the Village of Arthur, the Town of Mount Forest, and the Township of West Luther.

== Members of Parliament ==
This riding has elected the following members of Parliament:

Parliament	Years	Member	Party
Riding created from Perth—Wellington—Waterloo, Waterloo, Guelph—Wellington, Wellington—Grey—Dufferin—Simcoe and Kitchener
36th	1997–2000	Lynn Myers	Liberal
37th	2000–2004	Lynn Myers	Liberal
Riding dissolved into Cambridge, Kitchener—Conestoga, Perth Wellington and Wellington—Halton Hills

== Federal election results ==
2000 Canadian federal election
Party	Candidate	Votes	%	±%	Expenditures
Liberal	Lynn Myers	19,619	43.66	-0.34	$64,568.53
Alliance	John Reimer	14,797	32.93	+1.6	$47,962.31
Progressive Conservative	Michael Chong	7,999	17.80	-0.31	$24,282.50
New Democratic	Allan Douglas Strong	1,845	4.11	-2.45	$1,588.58
Green	Brent Bouteiller	432	0.96		$206.62
Christian Heritage	Peter Ellis	249	0.55		$2,148.45
Total valid votes/expense limit		44,941	100.0		
Total rejected ballots		156	0.28	–	
Turnout		45,097	58.11		
Eligible voters		77,610			
Liberal hold		Swing		-0.97	

1997 Canadian federal election
Party	Candidate	Votes	%
Liberal	Lynn Myers	20,038	44.00
Reform	Jeff Gerber	14,142	31.33
Progressive Conservative	Mary Dunlop	8,175	18.11
New Democratic	Mike Cooper	3,180	6.56
Total valid votes/expense limit		45,135	100.0

== Provincial election results ==
2003 Ontario general election
Party	Candidate	Votes	%	±%
Progressive Conservative	Ted Arnott	22550	48.97	-12.49
Liberal	Deborah Whale	17344	37.67	7.45
New Democratic	Richard Walsh-Bowers	3970	8.62	3.23
Green	Allan Strong	1203	2.61	1.29
Family Coalition	Gord Truscott	978	2.12	0.52

1999 Ontario general election
Party	Candidate	Votes	%
Progressive Conservative	Ted Arnott	26286	61.46
Liberal	Marion Reidel	12923	30.22
New Democratic	Richard Walsh-Bowers	2306	5.39
Family Coalition	Gord Truscott	685	1.6
Green	Brent Bouteiller	566	1.32

== See also ==
- List of Canadian electoral districts
- Historical federal electoral districts of Canada
