= Gary Schellenberger =

Canadian politician (born 1943)

Member of Parliament for Perth Wellington
- In office June 28, 2004 – October 19, 2015
- Preceded by: Riding Created
- Succeeded by: John Nater

Member of Parliament for Perth—Middlesex
- In office May 21, 2003 – June 28, 2004
- Preceded by: John Richardson
- Succeeded by: Riding Abolished

Chair of the Standing Committee on Canadian Heritage
- In office 9 May 2006 – 4 October 2010
- Minister: Bev Oda; Josee Verner; James Moore
- Preceded by: Marlene Catterall
- Succeeded by: Michael Chong

Personal details
- Born: September 15, 1943 (age 82) Sebringville, Ontario, Canada
- Party: Progressive Conservative (1997–2004); Conservative (2004–present)
- Spouse: Judy Schellenberger
- Profession: Businessman, interior decorator, painter

Gary Ralph Schellenberger (born September 15, 1943) is a Canadian politician. He was a member of the House of Commons of Canada from 2003 to 2015, and represented the riding of Perth Wellington for the Conservative Party. Schellenberger won five successive elections in eight years from 2003 to 2011. He did not stand for re-election in 2015.

== Early years ==
Schellenberger owned a painting and decorating store in Stratford before entering political life. Schellenberger also served as a volunteer firefighter with the Perth East Fire Department for 14 years. He is a freemason, and an elder at Avonton Presbyterian Church.

In 1996 Schellenberger raised $26,000 for the Sebringville Community Center and the Sebringville Athletic Association by walking from Tobermory to Sebringville.

== Political life ==
A councillor in the former Downie Township, Ontario from 1988 to 2000, he first ran for parliament in the 1997 federal election as a Progressive Conservative in Perth—Middlesex. He lost to Liberal John Richardson by over 8,000 votes; former Liberal MP-turned-Reformer Garnet Bloomfield was third. Richardson, Schellenberger and Bloomfield all ran again in the 2000 election, with the same overall result.

Richardson resigned his seat on November 10, 2002, suffering from a terminal illness. The subsequent by-election in 2003 garnered national attention, as both the Progressive Conservative and Canadian Alliance candidates attempted to displace the governing Liberals in the riding. Schellenberger, still running as a Progressive Conservative, defeated Liberal Brian Innes by 1,001 votes; despite several appearances from party leader Stephen Harper, the Alliance candidate, Marian Meinen, finished a distant third. Many interpreted this as a sign that the Alliance would be unable to win many Ontario seats in the next election. Shortly after his election, Schellenberger endorsed Peter MacKay for the leadership of the Progressive Conservative Party.

Schellenberger was appointed Deputy Whip of the Progressive Conservative Party in September 2003. In early 2004, the Progressive Conservative and Canadian Alliance parties merged as the Conservative Party of Canada.

In the federal election of 2004, Schellenberger was elected to the newly created riding of Perth-Wellington. He defeated Innes by almost 4,000 votes.

In the 2006 federal election, Schellenberger was re-elected by a margin of 9,703 votes, defeating the Liberal candidate, David Cunningham. In the 39th Canadian Parliament, Schellenberger was elected Chair of the House of Commons Standing Committee on Canadian Heritage.

In the 2008 federal election, Schellenberger won Perth-Wellington for a third time with 20,765 votes (48.08% of valid ballots) defeating Liberal challenger Sandra Gardiner by 10,540 votes. NDP candidate Kerry McManus finished third. In the 40th Canadian Parliament Schellenberger again served as Chair of the House of Commons Standing Committee on Canadian Heritage. In November 2010 Schellenberger became chair of a second House of Commons committee, the Standing Committee on Veterans Affairs.

In the 2011 federal election, Schellenberger won Perth-Wellington for a fourth time with 25,281 votes (54.5% of valid ballots) defeating NDP candidate Ellen Papenburg (9,861 votes) and Liberal candidate Bob McTavish (8,341 votes). In the 41st Canadian Parliament Schellenberger served as a member of the Standing Committee on Foreign Affairs and International Development as well as the Subcommittee on International Human Rights.

Schellenberger also served as Chair of the Canada-Germany Interparliamentary Group. In July 2014, he hosted German Ambassador Werner Wnendt in his riding.

On September 25, 2014, Schellenberger announced he would retire at the end of the 41st Canadian Parliament.

== Electoral record ==
=== Perth-Wellington ===
2011 Canadian federal election
| Party | Candidate | Votes | % | ±% | Expenditures |
|---|---|---|---|---|---|
| Conservative | Gary Schellenberger | 25,281 | 54.5 | +6.5 | – |
| New Democratic | Ellen Papenburg | 9,861 | 21.3 | +4.3 | – |
| Liberal | Bob McTavish | 8,341 | 18.0 | -5.7 | – |
| Green | John Cowling | 2,112 | 4.6 | -4.5 | – |
| Christian Heritage | Irma DeVries | 806 | 1.7 | -0.4 | – |
| Total valid votes/Expense limit | | 46,401 | 100.00 | | |
| Total rejected ballots | | 179 | 0.4 | – | |
| Turnout | | 46,580 | 64.2 | – | |
| Eligible voters | | 72,610 | – | – | |

2008 Canadian federal election
| Party | Candidate | Votes | % | ±% | Expenditures |
|---|---|---|---|---|---|
| Conservative | Gary Schellenberger | 20,709 | 48.0 | +1.9 | $68,139 |
| Liberal | Sandra Gardiner | 10,225 | 23.7 | -1.9 | $29,238 |
| New Democratic | Kerry McManus | 7,234 | 17.0 | -1.8 | $23,081 |
| Green | John Cowling | 3,884 | 9.0 | +2.5 | $13,365 |
| Christian Heritage | Irma DeVries | 898 | 2.1 | -0.8 | $8,662 |
| Marxist–Leninist | Julian Ichim | 98 | 0.2 | | |
| Total valid votes/Expense limit | | 43,048 | 100.0 | $82,152 | |

2006 Canadian federal election
| Party | Candidate | Votes | % | ±% |
|---|---|---|---|---|
| Conservative | Gary Schellenberger | 22,004 | 46.1 | +4.1 |
| Liberal | David Cunningham | 12,301 | 25.8 | -7.6 |
| New Democratic | Keith Dinicol | 8,876 | 18.6 | +3.0 |
| Green | John Cowling | 3,117 | 6.5 | +0.3 |
| Christian Heritage | Irma DeVries | 1,396 | 2.9 | +0.1 |
| Total valid votes | | 47,694 | 100.0 | |

2004 Canadian federal election
| Party | Candidate | Votes | % |
|---|---|---|---|
| Conservative | Gary Schellenberger | 18,879 | 42.0 |
| Liberal | Brian Innes | 15,032 | 33.4 |
| New Democratic | Robert Roth | 7,027 | 15.6 |
| Green | John Cowling | 2,770 | 6.2 |
| Christian Heritage | Irma Nicolette Devries | 1,273 | 2.8 |
| Total valid votes | | 44,981 | 100.0 |

=== Perth-Middlesex ===
Canadian federal by-election, 21 May 2003: Perth—Middlesex
| Party | Candidate | Votes |
|---|---|---|
| Progressive Conservative | Gary Schellenberger | 10,413 |
| Liberal | Brian Innes | 9,412 |
| Alliance | Marian Meinen | 5,400 |
| New Democratic | Sam Dinicol | 4,703 |
| Christian Heritage | Ron Gray | 902 |
By-election called upon Mr. Richardson's resignation.

2000 Canadian federal election: Perth—Middlesex
| Party | Candidate | Votes | % | ±% |
|---|---|---|---|---|
| Liberal | John Richardson | 16,988 | 40.37 | -3.64 |
| Progressive Conservative | Gary Schellenberger | 11,545 | 27.44 | +2.56 |
| Alliance | Garnet Bloomfield | 9,785 | 23.26 | +2.63 |
| New Democratic | Sam Dinicol | 2,800 | 6.65 | -1.90 |
| Green | Eric Eberhardt | 689 | 1.64 | – |
| No affiliation | Tom Kroesbergen | 141 | 0.34 | – |
| Canadian Action | Larry Carruthers | 128 | 0.30 | – |
| Total valid votes | | 42,076 | 100.00 | |
| Liberal hold | | Swing | | -3.10 |

1997 Canadian federal election: Perth—Middlesex
| Party | Candidate | Votes | % |
|---|---|---|---|
| Liberal | John Richardson | 19,583 | 44.01 |
| Progressive Conservative | Gary Schellenberger | 11,073 | 24.88 |
| Reform | Garnet Bloomfield | 9,180 | 20.63 |
| New Democratic | Linda Ham | 3,806 | 8.55 |
| Christian Heritage | Jamie Harris | 858 | 1.93 |
| Total valid votes | | 44,500 | 100.00 |
