= Perth County, Ontario =

Perth County
- County (upper-tier)
- County of Perth
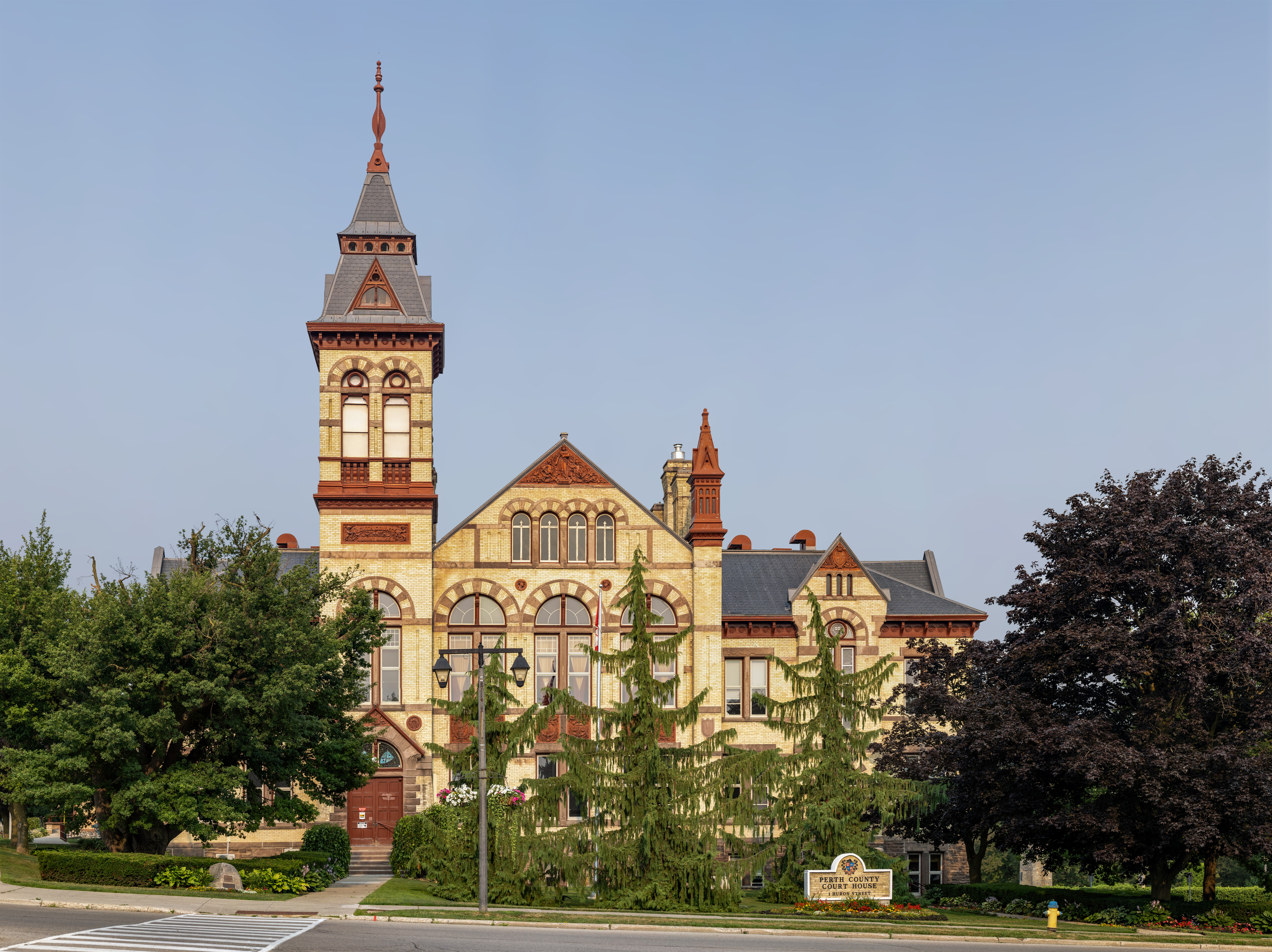
- Perth County Courthouse, Stratford, Ontario
- Motto: Cultivating Opportunity
- Location of Perth County
- Coordinates: 43°30′N 81°05′W
- Country: Canada
- Province: Ontario
- Formed: 1850
- County seat: Stratford
- Municipalities: List: Municipality of North Perth; Township of Perth East; Township of Perth South; Municipality of West Perth

Area
  - Land: 2,175.78 km^{2} (840.07 sq mi)
  - Census division: 2,218.24 km^{2} (856.47 sq mi)
- Land area excludes Stratford and St. Marys
- Elevation: 394 m (1,293 ft)

Population (2021)
  - Total: 40,639
  - Density: 18.7/km^{2} (48/sq mi)
  - Census division: 81,565
  - Census division density: 36.8/km^{2} (95/sq mi)
- Total excludes Stratford and St. Marys
- Time zone: UTC−5 (EST)
  - Summer (DST): UTC−4 (EDT)
- Area codes: 519 and 226
- Website: www.perthcounty.ca

Perth County is a county and census division in the Canadian province of Ontario in Southwestern Ontario, 100 kilometres (62 mi) west of Toronto. Its population centres are Listowel, Mitchell and Milverton. The City of Stratford and the Town of St. Marys are within the Perth census division, but are administered separately from Perth County. The 2021 population of Perth County was 38,066.

== Municipalities ==
Perth County is an upper-tier municipality comprised four lower-tier municipalities:

- Municipality of North Perth, 2016 population 13,130
- Township of Perth East, 2016 population 12,261
- Municipality of West Perth, 2016 population 8,865
- Township of Perth South, 2016 population 3,810

== History ==
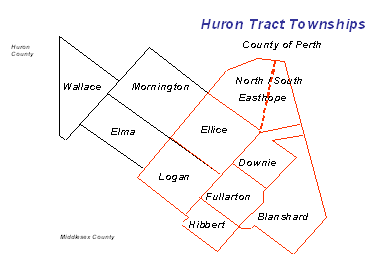
Historic townships in Perth County

Perth County was settled primarily through the efforts of the Canada Company agency which opened a road from the site of Stratford to Goderich. The settlers were almost equal in number as to their origins: English, Irish, Scottish and German. They began arriving in the 1820s but the majority arrived in the 1830s and the 1840s. Most became farmers, and even today, the county is known for mixed farming, dairying and hog production.

This area originally formed part of the Huron District, which was constituted as the United Counties of Huron, Perth and Bruce in 1850. The County of Perth was given its own Provisional Municipal Council at that time, and was separated from the United Counties in 1853.

It had 11 original townships. Eight of the townships were laid out as part of the Huron Tract, and three more were surveyed from that part of the crown land known as the Queen's Bush:

Original townships of Perth County
Part of	Township	Area	Opened for settlement	Description
Huron Tract	Blanshard	45,952 acres (72 sq mi; 186 km^{2})	1830	Named for Richard Blanshard, Director of the Canada Company.
Huron Tract	Downie	48,342 acres (76 sq mi; 196 km^{2})	1830	Named in honour of Robert Downie, M.P., one of the directors of the Canada Company.
Huron Tract	Easthope	66,758 acres (104 sq mi; 270 km^{2})	1830	Named for Sir John Easthope, M.P. A Director of the Canada Company. In 1843, the townships were divided into North Easthope and South Easthope.
Huron Tract	Ellice	54,520 acres (85 sq mi; 221 km^{2})	1830	Named in honour of Rt. Hon. Edward Ellice, a Canadian-born director of the Canada Company. His father was managing director of the Hudson's Bay Company.
Huron Tract	Fullarton	40,198 acres (63 sq mi; 163 km^{2})	1830	Named for John Fullarton, Director of the Canada Company.
Huron Tract	Hibbert	41,421 acres (65 sq mi; 168 km^{2})	1830	Named in honour of William T. Hibbert, Director of the Canada Company. First settler was Thomas Fox who received 200 acres (0.8 km^{2}) of land from the company on the condition he open an inn for travelers on the Huron Road.
Huron Tract	Logan	53,748 acres (84 sq mi; 218 km^{2})	1830	Named in honour of Hart Logan, Director of the Canada Company and uncle of Sir William E. Logan, the founder of the Canadian Geological Survey.
Queen's Bush	Elma	67,413 acres (105 sq mi; 273 km^{2})	1849	The first settlers, Samuel Boyd and George Code, came from Lanark County in 1848. Named in honour of Lady Elma Bruce, daughter of James Bruce, 8th Earl of Elgin, Governor-General of Canada.
Queen's Bush	Mornington	50,087 acres (78 sq mi; 203 km^{2})	1845	Surveyed in 1850. Named in honour of Richard Wellesley, Earl of Mornington, eldest brother of the Duke of Wellington.
Queen's Bush	Wallace	50,508 acres (79 sq mi; 204 km^{2})	1849	Named in honour of Thomas, Baron Wallace, vice-president of the British Board of Trade under Lord Goderich in 1820.

The City of Stratford was formed from parts of Downie, Ellice and Easthope Townships. In 1831 William Sergeant was given a lot by the Canada Company on the condition that he open an inn. In 1832 he erected the first frame building in the region by the Avon River and called it the "Shakespeare Hotel." First purchaser of land was John Sharman (1834), a blacksmith from Bedfordshire, England. His son, Henry, was the first child born within the limits of the city.

Over time, four additional towns were incorporated as urban municipalities: St. Marys, Mitchell, Listowel and Milverton. On January 1, 1998, the county was restructured by reducing fourteen municipalities to four. The City of Stratford and the Town of St. Marys retained their status as separated municipalities.

== Demographics ==
As a census division in the 2021 Census of Population conducted by Statistics Canada, Perth County had a population of 81,565 living in 32,772 of its 34,062 total private dwellings, a change of 6.2% from its 2016 population of 76,812. With a land area of 2,218.24 km^{2} (856.47 sq mi), it had a population density of 36.8/km^{2} (95.2/sq mi) in 2021.

Canada census – Perth County (census division) community profile

	2021	2016	2011
Population	81,565 (+6.2% from 2016)	76,796 (2.2% from 2011)	75,112 (1.0% from 2006)
Land area	2,218.24 km^{2} (856.47 sq mi)	2,218.52 km^{2} (856.58 sq mi)	2,218.46 km^{2} (856.55 sq mi)
Population density	36.8/km^{2} (95/sq mi)	34.6/km^{2} (90/sq mi)	33.9/km^{2} (88/sq mi)
Median age	42.4 (M: 40.8, F: 44)	42.4 (M: 41.0, F: 43.8)	41.2 (M: 39.7, F: 42.6)
Private dwellings	34,062 (total) 32,772 (occupied)	31,747 (total) 30,713 (occupied)	30,631 (total)
Median household income	$84,000	$70,336

Notes: Includes Stratford and St. Marys.
References: 2021 2016 2011

Historical census populations – Perth County, Ontario

Year	Pop.	±%
1921	50,245	—
1931	50,763	+1.0%
1941	49,058	−3.4%
1951	51,962	+5.9%
1956	54,388	+4.7%
1961	56,782	+4.4%

Year	Pop.	±%
1966	60,424	+6.4%
1971	62,973	+4.2%
1976	66,279	+5.2%
1981	66,096	−0.3%
1986	66,597	+0.8%
1991	69,976	+5.1%

Year	Pop.	±%
1996	72,106	+3.0%
2001	73,675	+2.2%
2006	74,344	+0.9%
2011	75,112	+1.0%
2016	76,796	+2.2%
2021	81,565	+6.2%

Includes Stratford and St. Marys. Population counts are not adjusted for boundary changes.
Source: Statistics Canada

== Government ==
=== County Council ===
Perth County Council is made up of representatives from the four Lower-Tier member municipalities within the county's boundaries (Municipality of North Perth, Township of Perth South, Township of Perth East, Municipality of West Perth), not including Stratford or St. Marys which had 48.8% of the population in 2011. The head of County Council, known as the Warden, is elected annually from amongst the County council members, in December, by a vote at council.

=== Current Members of County Council ===
- Warden Doug Kellum (Deputy Mayor, Municipality of North Perth)
- Deputy Warden Dean Trentowsky (Deputy Mayor, Municipality of West Perth)
- Councillor Todd Kasenberg (Mayor, Municipality of North Perth)
- Councillor Matt Duncan (Councillor, Municipality of North Perth)
- Councillor Rhonda Ehgoetz (Mayor, Township of Perth East)
- Councillor Hugh McDermid (Deputy Mayor, Township of Perth East)
- Councillor Jerry Smith (Councillor, Township of Perth East)
- Councillor Sue Orr (Mayor, Township of Perth South)
- Councillor Robert Wilhelm (Councillor, Township of Perth South)
- Councillor Walter McKenzie (Mayor, Municipality of West Perth)

The City of Stratford and Town of St. Marys do not have a seat on Perth County Council. The County, City and Town share a number of services (Paramedic Services, Stratford-Perth Archives, Social Services, Spruce Lodge Home for the Aged, etc.). The three municipalities form the Municipal Shared Services Committee (MSSC) for the purpose of deliberating on the shared services.

=== Federal Government ===
Perth—Wellington is a federal electoral district in Ontario, Canada, that has been represented in the House of Commons of Canada since 2004. It was created in 2003 from parts of Dufferin—Peel—Wellington—Grey, Perth—Middlesex and Waterloo—Wellington ridings.

It consists of the County of Perth, the City of Stratford, the Town of St. Mary's and the Town of Minto and the townships of Mapleton and Wellington North in the County of Wellington.

Parliament	Years	Member	Party
38th	2004–2006	Gary Schellenberger	Conservative
39th	2006–2008	Gary Schellenberger	Conservative
40th	2008–2011	Gary Schellenberger	Conservative
41st	2011–2015	Gary Schellenberger	Conservative
42nd	2015–present	John Nater	Conservative

=== Provincial Government ===
Perth—Wellington is a provincial electoral district in Ontario, Canada, that has been represented in the Legislative Assembly of Ontario since the 2007 provincial election. It was created in 2003 from parts of Dufferin—Peel—Wellington—Grey, Perth—Middlesex and Waterloo—Wellington ridings.

It consists of the County of Perth, and the Town of Minto and the townships of Mapleton and Wellington North in the County of Wellington. Randy Pettapiece was elected MPP for the riding on October 6, 2011, and has been re-elected twice.

Perth—Wellington
Assembly	Years	Member	Party
39th	2007–2011	John Wilkinson	Liberal
40th	2011–2014	Randy Pettapiece	Progressive Conservative
41st	2014–2018	Randy Pettapiece	Progressive Conservative
42nd	2018–2022	Randy Pettapiece	Progressive Conservative
43rd	2022–present	Matthew Rae	Progressive Conservative

== Economy ==
Perth County is an agricultural area; farm cash receipts for main commodities totaled $739 million in 2012. The county is home to 2,252 census farms and 506,291 acres of farmland, employing over 3,000 people (2012) in crop and animal production. Dairy farming is the primary category, with receipts of $210 million (2012) while pork production is second at $161 million. Food processing industries are also represented, with 20 such companies (2012).

Manufacturing, primarily in Stratford and Listowel, Ontario is also significant. Categories include auto parts, metal fabrication, plastic injection moulding, robotics, and building and construction as well as plastics and textile manufacturing. Stratford has been attracting an increasing number of high-tech companies.

The largest employers in Perth County include Maple Leaf Foods, Listowel Technology Inc., Spinrite Inc., Cooper Standard Automotive, Erie Meat Products Ltd., Parmalat, Armtech-Durisol, Ideal Supply Company Ltd., Taylor Construction and FGC Construction.

Particularly in Stratford, tourism is a major part of the economy because of the Stratford Festival which runs from May to October each year. The full County has increased its efforts to boost tourism in the areas outside Stratford; it hired a full-time Tourism Coordinator in January 2017.

== Transportation ==
The area is serviced by the Stratford Municipal Airport which can handle air traffic ranging from Dash 8s to helicopters. It services over 12,000 yearly flights: freight, corporate and recreational. Larger airports are located in London, Ontario, Hamilton, Ontario and outside Toronto, Ontario. Passenger rail service is offered by VIA Rail with trains from Stratford to London, Toronto and Ottawa daily. Three carriers provide daily freight rail service. In July 2026, Metrolinx began year-round GO Train service to Stratford.

== Health Care ==
Perth County has three hospitals, in Stratford, Listowel and St. Marys, with 24-hour emergency services. Large regional health care centres are located in London, Ontario and Kitchener-Waterloo, Ontario.

Listowel Hospital offers comprehensive care including a breast health centre and a Family Primary Care Centre. Stratford General Hospital offers many services, including MRI.

Perth County Paramedic Services has seven staffed ambulances; stations are located in Stratford, St. Marys, Listowel, Mitchell and Milverton. The Headquarters are in Stratford.

== Police services ==
The City of Stratford has its own Police Department. The Stratford Police Service also provides service to St. Marys and Perth South with a police cruiser on patrol 24/7 and an additional officer stationed at St. Marys Town Hall during business hours. Other areas of the county receive services from the Ontario Provincial Police, Perth County Detachment in Sebringville with satellite offices in Listowel, Mitchell and St. Marys

== Education ==
Perth County is served by the Avon Maitland District School Board and the Huron Perth Catholic District School Board. Private schools are also present: Listowel Christian School, Nancy Campbell Academy, Sunshine Montessori School, Stratford & District Christian School and Stratford Middle Years School.

Post-Secondary facilities include the Stratford Campuses of Conestoga College and the University of Waterloo as well as Stratford Chef's School.

== Media ==
=== Newspapers ===
- The Stratford Beacon Herald
- Independent Plus
- Listowel Banner
- Bader, Andy. "Mitchell Advocate". The London Free Press.
- St. Marys Independent
- Stratford Times

=== Radio ===
- CJCS-FM
- CHGK-FM
- CHLP-FM

== See also ==
- List of county courthouses in Ontario
- List of municipalities in Ontario
- List of townships in Ontario
