= Perth—Middlesex =

Former federal electoral district in Ontario, Canada

Ontario electoral district

Defunct federal electoral district
- Legislature: House of Commons
- District created: 1996
- District abolished: 2003
- First contested: 1997
- Last contested: 2003 by-election

Perth—Middlesex was an electoral district in Ontario, Canada, that was represented in the House of Commons of Canada from 1997 to 2003.

This riding was created in 1996 from parts of Lambton—Middlesex, London—Middlesex and Perth—Wellington—Waterloo ridings. It consisted of:

- the County of Perth (including the City of Stratford and the Town of St Mary's) and
- the northeast part of the County of Middlesex (consisting of the Townships of McGillivray, East Williams, Lobo, Biddulph and West Nissouri).

The electoral district was abolished in 2003 when it was redistributed between Elgin—Middlesex—London, Middlesex—Kent—Lambton and Perth Wellington ridings.

== Members of Parliament ==
This riding has elected the following members of Parliament:

Parliament	Years	Member	Party
Riding created from Lambton—Middlesex, London—Middlesex and Perth—Wellington—Waterloo
36th	1997–2000	John Richardson	Liberal
37th	2000–2002	John Richardson	Liberal
37th	2003–2004	Gary Schellenberger	Progressive Conservative
Riding dissolved into Elgin—Middlesex—London, Middlesex—Kent—Lambton and Perth Wellington

== Election results ==
1997 Canadian federal election
Party	Candidate	Votes	%
Liberal	John Richardson	19,583	44.01
Progressive Conservative	Gary Schellenberger	11,073	24.88
Reform	Garnet Bloomfield	9,180	20.63
New Democratic	Linda Ham	3,806	8.55
Christian Heritage	Jamie Harris	858	1.93
Total valid votes		44,500	100.00

2000 Canadian federal election
Party	Candidate	Votes	%	±%
Liberal	John Richardson	16,988	40.37	-3.64
Progressive Conservative	Gary Schellenberger	11,545	27.44	+2.56
Alliance	Garnet Bloomfield	9,785	23.26	+2.63
New Democratic	Sam Dinicol	2,800	6.65	-1.90
Green	Eric Eberhardt	689	1.64	–
No affiliation	Tom Kroesbergen	141	0.34	–
Canadian Action	Larry Carruthers	128	0.30	–
Total valid votes		42,076	100.00	
Liberal hold		Swing		-3.10

Canadian federal by-election, 21 May 2003
Party	Candidate	Votes	%	±%
Progressive Conservative	Gary Schellenberger	10,413	33.78	+6.34
Liberal	Brian Innes	9,412	30.53	-9.84
Alliance	Marian Meinen	5,400	17.52	-5.74
New Democratic	Sam Dinicol	4,703	15.25	+8.60
Christian Heritage	Ron Gray	902	2.92	–
Total valid votes		30,830	100.00	–
Progressive Conservative gain from Liberal		Swing		+8.09
By-election called upon Mr. Richardson's resignation.

== See also ==
- List of Canadian electoral districts
- Historical federal electoral districts of Canada
