= Non-binding resolution =

Motion by a deliberative body that isn't law

A non-binding resolution is a motion adopted by a deliberative body that does not enact a law or a substantive rule, and is simply used to make known what the opinions of that body are in relation to a certain fact or event.

This type of resolution is often used to express the body's approval or disapproval of something that they cannot otherwise vote on, due to the matter being handled by another jurisdiction, or being protected by a constitution. An example would be a resolution of support for a nation's troops in battle, which carries no legal weight, but is adopted for moral support.

== Use ==
Non-binding resolutions are usually specific simple or concurrent resolutions that are not passed on to the executive branch to be signed into the law. These resolutions differ from pure concurrent resolutions (that are used for various procedural requests such as adjourning sessions) in that they are designed to express formally, document opinions and not initiate a process.

These resolutions offer a means for elected officials to publicly air the concerns of their constituents and are closely followed by major media outlets. Additionally, these resolutions can be used to state the position of the legislature, showing a preview of how they will vote on future legislation and budget allocations.

== Notable historic uses ==
=== Canada ===
- Private Members Motion 296 in support of Jordan's Principle was passed unanimously in the House of Commons of Canada on December 12, 2007.
- Motion 312 was a motion introduced to the Parliament of Canada by Stephen Woodworth, MP for Kitchener Centre, in 2012. M-312 called for the formation of a committee "to review the declaration in Subsection 223(1) of the Criminal Code which states that a child becomes a human being only at the moment of complete birth".
- Motion 103 was a non-binding motion in the 42nd Canadian Parliament stating that the members of the House of Commons called on the Government of Canada to condemn Islamophobia in Canada. It also called on the Standing Committee on Canadian Heritage to carry out a study on how racism and religious discrimination can be reduced and collect data on hate crimes. The motion was introduced by Iqra Khalid, the Liberal MP representing Mississauga—Erin Mills. The motion passed by a vote of 201–91 on March 23, 2017.

=== United Nations ===
- All United Nations General Assembly resolutions that are not about matters internal to the UN (such as the structure of the UN or the creation of UN agencies) are inherently and explicitly (in the UN Charter) non-binding.
- The United Nations Security Council has the power to pass both binding and non-binding resolutions; whether a resolution is binding depends on what section of the Charter it is enacted under.

=== United States ===
In the United States Congress, non-binding resolutions are frequently titled as a "Sense of Congress" resolution, if both houses pass the measure (a concurrent resolution), or as a "Sense of the Senate" or "Sense of the House" resolution, if the measure is passed by only one house (a simple resolution).

- On June 22, 1971, the Senate passed a non-binding resolution in support of withdrawing troops from Vietnam.
- In July 1998, the Senate passed a non-binding resolution affirming their commitment to a democratic Taiwan.
- In February 2007, the House of Representatives passed a non-binding resolution, House Concurrent resolution 63, to formally express its disapproval of President Bush's troop buildup in Iraq.
- House of Representatives passed a non-binding resolution (HRES 224), recognizing March 14, 2009, as National Pi Day.

A "sense of Congress" clause may also be used within legislation to direct the actions which Congress wishes the executive to undertake, for example:

"It is the sense of Congress that the Secretary of Defense should take appropriate steps to provide for upgrading information technology systems for the reserve contingents ..."

The legislatures of the 50 U.S. states also frequently adopt non-binding resolutions. For example:

- In February 2007, the House of Representatives and Senate of the State of Vermont respectively passed non-binding resolutions calling for the orderly withdrawal of American military forces from Iraq to commence immediately.

== See also ==
- Resolution (law)
- Non-binding referendum
