= M103 =

M103 or M-103 may refer to:

- M103 heavy tank, an American heavy tank
- M103 (New York City bus), a bus route in Manhattan
- M-103 (Michigan highway), a state highway in Michigan
- Mercedes-Benz M103 engine
- Messier 103, an open star cluster in the constellation Cassiopeia
- Motion 103, also known as M-103, a motion in the House of Commons of Canada
- M103 railway (Croatia), a railway line in Croatia
