= Amira Elghawaby =

Canadian journalist

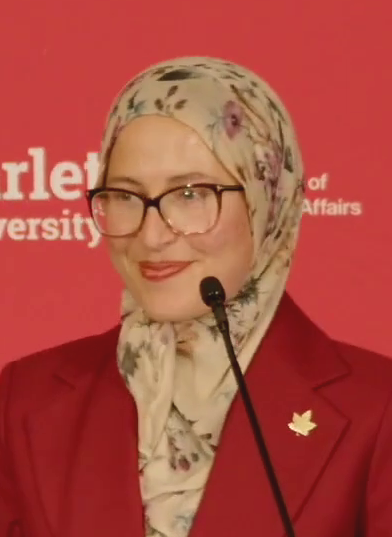
- Elghawaby in 2023

1st Special Representative on Combatting Islamophobia
- In office February 20, 2023 – February 25, 2026
- Preceded by: Office established
- Succeeded by: Office abolished

Personal details
- Education: Carleton University

Amira Elghawaby is an Egyptian-born Canadian journalist, communications professional, and human rights activist. She was Canada's first and only Special Representative on Combatting Islamophobia from 2023 to 2026.

== Early life and education ==
Elghawaby was born in Egypt to Egyptian parents; her father was an engineer.

She emigrated to Canada at the age of two months with her mother, and also spent four of her early years in Bandung, Indonesia. She grew up in the East End of Ottawa.

Elghawaby has a combined honours degree in journalism and law from Carleton University.

== Career ==
Elghawaby is a human rights activist and a journalist. She was previously employed as a communications lead by the Canadian Race Relations Foundation, and was a freelance journalist who contributes columns to The Toronto Star. She previously worked at CBC News, the Canadian labour movement, and as a human rights co-ordinator and later Director of Communications for the National Council of Canadian Muslims. She was one of the founding board members of the Canadian Anti-Hate Network and is a member of Canada's National Security Transparency Advisory Group. She served two terms as Commissioner for the Public Policy Forum's Commission on Democratic Expression. Elghawaby also previously participated in interfaith initiatives.

On January 26, 2023, Prime Minister Justin Trudeau appointed Elghawaby as Canada's first special representative on combatting Islamophobia, for a four-year term. Her office has a budget of $5.6 million to cover the first five years of activities. The National Council of Canadian Muslims described her appointment as a "historic moment for Muslims in Canada".

== Special Representative on Combatting Islamophobia ==
In January 2023, Elghawaby was appointed as Canada's first Special Representative on Combatting Islamophobia, with a mandate to advise the federal government and support efforts to address anti-Muslim hate.

During her tenure, she undertook a series of community consultations across Canadian cities, including London, Markham, Calgary, Edmonton, Montreal, Moncton, and Halifax, to engage with Muslim communities and gather input on experiences with Islamophobia. Findings from these consultations were shared with federal officials as part of her advisory role.

Her office provided input on policy initiatives such as the proposed Online Harms Act (Bill C-63) and the Security Infrastructure Program, and worked with departments including Justice Canada and Public Safety. In 2024, she co-signed a memorandum of understanding with the Federal Ombudsperson for Victims of Crime and Canada's Special Envoy on Preserving Holocaust Remembrance to improve coordination on hate crime victim support.

Elghawaby has contributed to public education initiatives, including the Canadian launch of an OSCE guide on addressing anti-Muslim hate crimes and the release of resources such as a digital campaign highlighting Muslim women's contributions during Islamic History Month 2023. In 2024, she delivered a lecture for the Canada School of Public Service that became part of a permanent training module on Islamophobia for public servants.

In March 2025, her office released The Canadian Guide to Understanding and Combatting Islamophobia, a resource for institutions and the public on identifying and addressing anti-Muslim discrimination. Members of the Muslim Countervoice Initiative criticized this guide, noting that "its recommendation to “centre diverse Muslim voices” sounds admirably inclusive until one realizes which Muslim voices are systematically excluded: secular and reformist Muslims, as well as those who reject the injection of extremism and antisemitism into Islamic doctrine... This betrays Muslims fighting for liberal values and denies the rich diversity of thought within Muslim communities themselves. It also creates the false impression that Islam is monolithic, rather than dynamic and evolving."

Internationally, she participated in coordination efforts with counterparts from Europe and North America, including signing a joint statement in November 2023 denouncing anti-Muslim discrimination. She has also issued official statements marking significant events, such as the anniversaries of the Québec City mosque attack and the London, Ontario vehicle attack.

The office was abolished by the Carney government in February 2026 in favour of a new Advisory Council on Rights, Equality and Inclusion.

== Controversies ==
Days after her appointment Quebec Premier François Legault called for her resignation, after La Presse reported that Elghawaby had written that Quebeckers seem "influenced by anti-Muslim sentiment," in a 2019 column in the Ottawa Citizen. The same La Presse article also reported that in May 2021 Elghawaby wrote "I'm going to puke" on Twitter in reaction to an opinion editorial by Joseph Heath, a philosophy teacher of the University of Toronto, who argued that French Canadians were the largest group in Canada to have suffered from British colonialism.

Elghawaby later told a Quebec newspaper that she regretted the tweet, which she said was written "in the heat of the moment" after the discovery of unmarked graves at the former Kamloops residential school. She stated that she did not intend to belittle the discrimination experienced by French Canadians and deleted the tweet a few months later. In a blog post, Heath expressed some sympathy for her reaction, suggesting that the tweet stemmed from a misunderstanding of his article and acknowledging that the piece was crafted in a deliberately provocative manner to challenge assumptions about identity politics.

Trudeau said he expected her comments to be clarified, but later reaffirmed that he stands by her appointment. On February 1, 2023, Amira Elghawaby apologized for her comments about how her words in the past have hurt the people of Quebec. She expressed that she has been listening to Quebecers.

A parliamentary motion in the National Assembly of Quebec denouncing her appointment was supported by the Coalition Avenir Québec, Quebec Liberal Party and the Parti Québécois.

On February 3, 2023, a letter in support of her appointment was published by a group of 30 prominent Québécois, including human rights lawyer Julius Grey, Quebec City Mosque co-founder Boufeldja Benabdallah, and Charles Taylor, professor emeritus at McGill University. The letter acknowledged the prior concern, but advocated for Elghawaby to be allowed to perform her new role. On February 5, a second letter with 200 signatories including Université de Montréal professor Nadia El-Mabrouk, and activist Ensaf Haidar, called for Elghawaby's resignation and the abolition of her office, signatories refused " to be associated to a Muslim community represented by people who promote a fundamentalist vision of Islam". On February 14, speaking at the Senate of Canada former Calgary mayor Naheed Nenshi raised concerns about Islamophobia and urged parliamentarians to stand up for Elghawaby. Rania Lawendy CEO of Action for Humanity Canada, said that the letters show "the Canadian political landscape is not a safe place for a visible Muslim woman, and this incident is a perfect example of how discrimination continues to be tolerated by our government leaders."

On February 13, 2024, a pro-Palestinian protest in downtown Toronto drew controversy for passing by Mount Sinai Hospital. Elghawaby responded on the social media platform X, stating that “also troubling and wrong is the rush to label protesters as antisemitic and/or terrorist sympathisers.” Following her comments about the protest, some pro-Israel advocacy organizations publicly criticized Elghawaby.

On Aug 30, 2024, Elghawaby sent a letter to the presidents of Canadian colleges and universities, suggesting that to improve the dangerous climate on campuses and to ease tensions since the war in Gaza, educational institutions should support freedom of expression, provide clear direction on the difference between feeling safe and being uncomfortable; provide guidance on anti-Palestinian and anti-Arab hate and racism, and Islamophobia and increase representation of Muslim, Arab, and Palestinian faculty. Quebec Premier Francois Legault and higher education minister Pascale Dery were opposed, with Dery noting that hiring professors based on religion goes against provincial principles of secularism.

== Personal life ==
Elghawaby lives in Ottawa. She is married with three children. She is Muslim.

== See also ==
- Islamophobia in Canada
