= Ramadan in Canada =

Religious observance in Canada

Ramadan in Canada is observed by Canadian Muslims just like other Muslims around the world as a month of fasting, prayer, reflection, and community. Canada home to a diverse and growing Muslim population, religious devotion, cultural traditions, and communal activities mark Ramadan.

== Overview ==
Ramadan is one of the Five Pillars of Islam and holds immense spiritual significance for Muslims. In Canada, where Muslims make up about 5% of the population (over 1.8 million people), the month is observed through fasting from dawn to sunset, increased prayers, charity, and community gatherings. The experience varies across the country due to Canada’s vast geography, multiculturalism, and differing daylight hours.

== Dates and moon sighting ==
Ramadan follows the Islamic lunar calendar, meaning its start and end dates shift by 10–12 days each year in the Gregorian calendar. The exact dates are determined by local moon-sighting committees in cities like Toronto, Vancouver, and Montreal, or by following announcements from Muslim-majority countries.

Northern regions like Yellowknife may have longer fasting hours (15+) and sometimes follow Makkah’s timings for convenience.

== Community practices ==
Canadian Muslims observe Ramadan through various traditions:

Community Iftars: Mosques and Islamic centers host meals for breaking fast together.

Charity (Zakat & Sadaqah): Increased donations to organizations like Islamic Relief Canada and local food banks.

Quran Recitation: Many aim to complete the Quran, with Taraweeh prayers facilitating this.

Educational Programs: Lectures and workshops on Islamic teachings.

== Government and public recognition ==
The Canadian government acknowledges the importance of Ramadan through official statements and public recognition. For example, Minister of Health Kamal Khera has highlighted Ramadan as a time of generosity, compassion, and renewed commitment to supporting the vulnerable.

Landmark lightings like the CN Tower were also lit up for Ramadan.

And anti-discrimination efforts are also being made for programs that combat Islamophobia.
