= 2021 London, Ontario truck attack =

Terrorist attack in Ontario, Canada

London, Ontario truck attack
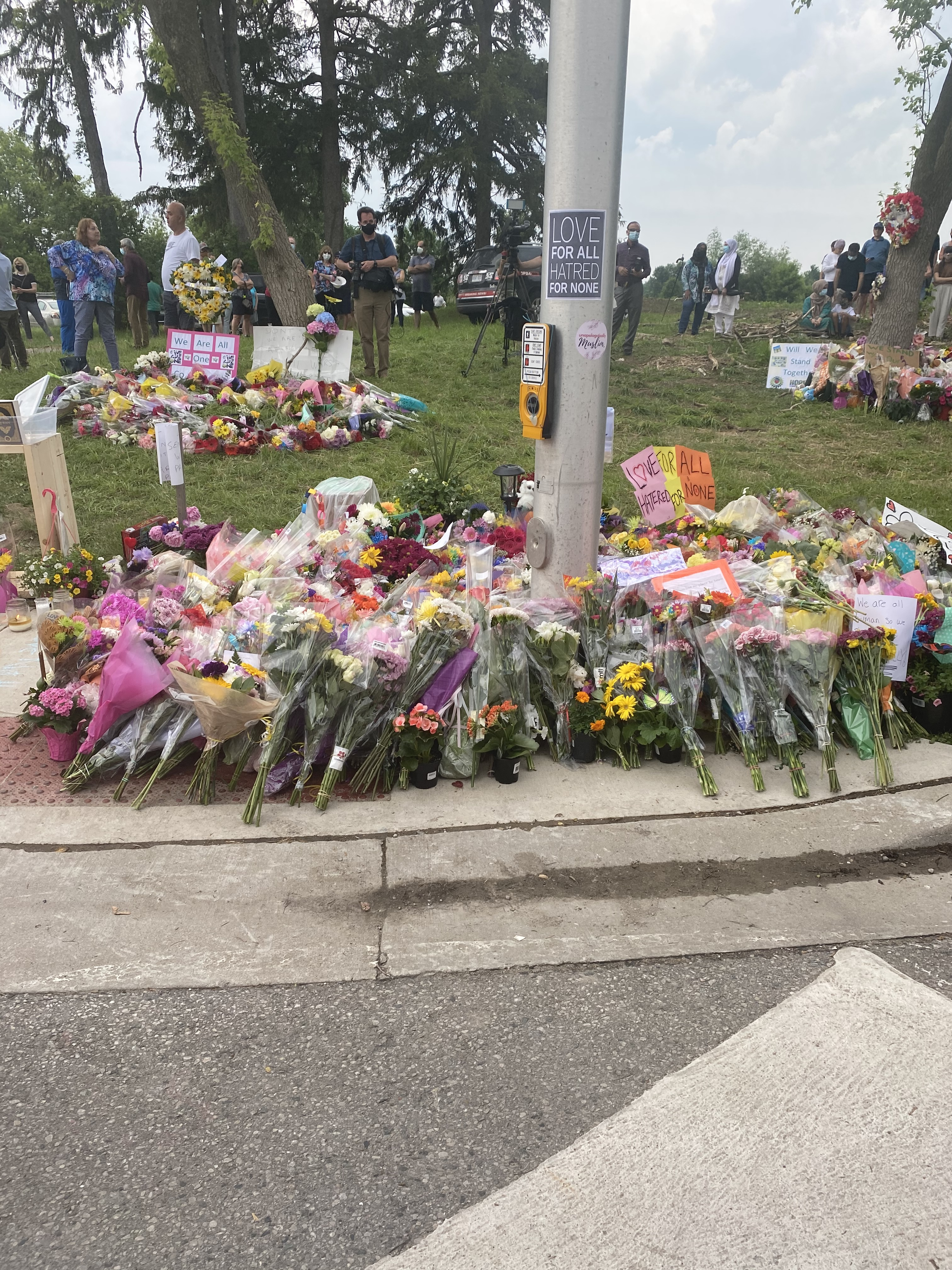
- Flowers placed at the scene following the attack
- Location: 42°59′41″N 81°19′48″W; London, Ontario, Canada
- Date: June 6, 2021; 5 years ago
- Target: Muslim pedestrians
- Attack type: Vehicle-ramming attack, mass murder, hate crime
- Weapon: 2016 Ram 1500
- Deaths: 4
- Injuries: 1
- Perpetrator: Nathaniel Veltman
- Motive: Christian extremism, Islamophobia
- Convictions: First-degree murder (4 counts); Attempted murder

On June 6, 2021, 20-year-old Nathaniel Veltman rammed a pickup truck into a family of Muslim Pakistani Canadian pedestrians at an intersection in London, Ontario, Canada. Four people were killed and a fifth was wounded. The attack was the deadliest mass killing in London's history. It was condemned by Canadian leaders, and described as terrorism by Prime Minister of Canada Justin Trudeau, Prime Minister of Pakistan Imran Khan and Premier of Ontario Doug Ford.

In Canada's first murder trial involving terrorism charges, a jury found Veltman guilty of four counts of first-degree murder and one count of attempted murder. In February 2024, a judge ruled that the attack amounted to terrorism under Canadian law and sentenced Veltman to five terms of life imprisonment.

== Attack ==
At about 8:40 p.m. on June 6, 2021, in London, Ontario, 20-year-old Nathaniel Veltman intentionally steered his black Dodge Ram pickup truck into five members of a Pakistani Canadian family waiting to cross the road at the intersection of Hyde Park Road and South Carriage Road in London's Hyde Park neighbourhood.

A grandmother, a father, a mother and two children, the two women wearing traditional Pakistani clothing, were waiting at the intersection after a family walk in Hyde Park when the perpetrator saw the family at the intersection waiting for the light to change. He did a U-turn, and accelerated towards the intersection, steering toward the curb 5 seconds before impact, with the gas pedal fully compressed. With the brakes unused, his truck plowed into the family. He continued at excessive speeds weaving in and out lanes and running red lights down Oxford Street.

A witness described being stopped at a red light when the truck sped past her, shaking her car from the force. Another witness described hearing an engine revving and looking up to see one of the victims flying 30–40 feet (9–12 m) from the intersection.

One woman was pronounced dead at the scene, and the others were rushed to a hospital, three of them later succumbed to their wounds. One of the children survived with severe injuries.

According to police, this attack was intentional, and motivated by anti-Muslim hatred. According to a co-worker from Gray Ridge Egg Farms, Veltman was having issues with the steering of his new truck three days before the attack.

The attack was the deadliest mass murder in London's history and the deadliest mass killing in Canada, in 2021.

== Victims ==
The five victims were all from the same family and Muslims; most arrived in Canada from Pakistan in 2007. The dead were a 46-year-old husband, Salman Afzaal, his 44-year-old wife, Madiha Salman, their 15-year-old daughter, Yumnah Afzaal and his 74-year-old mother, Talat Afzaal. The only survivor, the family's 9-year-old boy was seriously injured. On June 14, a family friend said he was out of the hospital.

== Arrest and police investigation ==
CCTV footage of Veltman's arrest.

At 8:44 p.m., the pickup truck approached a cab parked at Cherryhill Village Mall, about 7 km (4.3 mi) away from the attack. The driver of the truck, Veltman, approached the cab driver, said that he had just killed someone and asked the cabbie to call the police. Speaking on behalf of the traumatized driver, Yellow Taxi London president Hassan Savehilaghi described Veltman as wearing a military-style helmet and a bullet-proof vest which may have been tagged with swastikas, and the truck was covered with blood. Savehilaghi's description was corroborated by a mall maintenance worker who also witnessed the arrest. The driver called 9-1-1 and waved down a passing police cruiser. Veltman laughed and asked the driver to film the arrest.

The perpetrator surrendered to London city police as they arrived in the parking lot at 8:46 p.m. The arresting officer said that the suspect "did not appear upset at all", instead, he was "happy, smiling, ... [and] giddy". He was wearing a body-armour-style vest at the time of his arrest, a white T-shirt with a cross spray painted on it, and might have participated in an airsoft shooting game that evening before the collision. The initial charge was dangerous operation of a motor vehicle; minutes later, charges of first-degree murder and attempted murder were added.

He had no previous connection to the victims and initial reports said he had no known ties to hate groups.

The attacker consulted with a defense attorney and was interviewed by a police detective 4 hours after the arrest between 1:30 and 3:30 a.m. The detective offered Veltman food, and repeatedly assured Veltman that he had right to legal counsel and that he was not obligated to speak to police. The perpetrator was still "pumped" and energetic from the attack. He described running down pedestrians as surprisingly easy, yet said he found it "distasteful" a few moments after the attack, and decided to turn himself in instead of going on a "rampage" as he had been planning

The perpetrator stated that he did not plan to plead insanity, would tell the complete truth because he had nothing to lose, and wanted the world to know why he committed a deliberate act of terror.

The attacker stated that his motives were "100% political", and that he took no personal pleasure in the attacks in what he described as a terror attack. The first was retaliation to what he perceived as "minority on white crime" and Muslim child exploitation gangs in the UK, a common trope among white nationalist groups. In reality, according to the UK Home Office, "research has found that group-based offenders are most commonly White." He stated that "they [Muslims] leave you no choice" and identified the family as Muslim based on their clothes. The second motivation was to act as an example to other white nationalists to commit copycat crimes with vehicles and "inspire more young men to stop sitting around and letting this happen".

In a second interview conducted the next day around 10 a.m., Veltman was more subdued, answering with one-word answers, and deferring to his lawyer more often.

By June 7, the perpetrator was charged with four counts of first-degree murder and one count of attempted murder. The London Police Service believe he planned the attack in advance.

By June 9, London police had consulted with the RCMP, the Ministry of the Attorney General and Public Prosecution Service of Canada and determined they would lay terrorism charges, adding that they believed the perpetrator acted alone. Murray Faulkner, retired chief of the London Police Service, pointed out that these were unusual charges as Canadian terror laws are generally designed to prevent imminent threats, not prosecute done deeds. Conviction under terrorism laws requires 1) a criminal act; 2) a political or ideological motives; and 3) most importantly, an intent to frighten or intimidate the public. He stressed that while these terrorism charges were important, the first-degree murder charges are by far the most serious criminal charges possible in Canada and that Canadians should focus on these crimes.

== Perpetrator ==
=== Background ===
The perpetrator was 20-year-old Nathaniel Veltman, who worked at an egg-packing facility in Strathroy and lived in an apartment on Covent Market Place in downtown London.

Veltman was born December 20, 2000, and was enrolled in the Strathroy District Collegiate Institute for his last two years of high school as his mother filed for divorce. In 2016, she won sole custody of the children. Nathaniel was at the centre of a bitter dispute between the parents, and he would move out of the home in 2017 after he had turned 16 and it was legal to do so. Divorce records show that the perpetrator was prone to anger, medicated for mental illness, and seen by his parents as "peculiar and challenging", with both agreeing he should continue therapy and be supervised around his younger siblings. Classmates described Veltman as quiet, studious and agreeable, but odd and withdrawn.

By 2018, Veltman was working in an egg-processing plant in the town of Strathroy with other young men from the area. In September, he enrolled at Fanshawe College studying architectural drafting. He made friends easily, and moved into a basement apartment with a friend from the plant. Some coworkers describe him as helpful and quick to finish the task of others if they needed to leave early. A co-worker who was raised as a Muslim described him as a proud Christian, and noted he seemed to treat Muslims normally for the four years he worked there. Co-workers said the alleged murders and motivation seemed out-of-character and unexpected, one denying Veltman is a radical terrorist or Islamophobe.

Yet others recall racist rants about Black people and references to antisemitic conspiracy theories about lizard people. Many recall him breaking several cell phones in disgust after watching pornography on his phone while at work. He would often drink heavily at karaoke nights with his friends at the local pub and leave drunk. One friend recalls Veltman recounting that he was fighting demons along the Sydenham river after one binge. Police sources cite 13 minor incidents involving Veltman. He had two arrests: one for breaking into a neighbour's house, thinking it was his own, and a ticket for public intoxication in March 2019.

=== Radicalization ===
According to the police interview on the day of his arrest, the perpetrator first considered committing a terrorist attack on abortion doctors when he was 13 years old, inspired by the assassination of an abortion doctor in the U.S.

The perpetrator became involved with fringe political movements. He volunteered in the 2019 Canada election for the Christian Heritage Party for the riding of Elgin—Middlesex—London. A party member and farmer reached out to him noting his anguish and distress and increased isolation with the COVID-19 pandemic, but did not know of his racist and violent tendencies. In November 2020, Veltman wrote a long email to the farmer, detailing his psychological struggles. They planned to meet for Christmas, but Veltman declared that he was too broke to put windshield wiper fluid in his car and couldn't make the drive.

During this time, he spent a lot of time on the internet doing "research" about what he called media dishonesty and the role of Western governments in covering up crimes committed by minorities against white people. He didn't interact with people who shared his views because he was worried about being put on a government watch list. He told the detective that he "was very paranoid about the feds". He also wanted "ethnic autonomy" and to "not give over everything to minorities."

The accused said to the police the attack is "politically motivated, 100 percent"; that he read the anti-immigration white supremacist manifestos by the perpetrators of the 2011 Norway attacks, where 77 were killed, and by the perpetrator of the New Zealand mosque attacks, where 51 were killed; and that he wrote a manifesto called A White Awakening, railing against Muslims and "mass immigration".

By May 4, 2021, a month before the attack, Veltman was working on a manifesto explaining his attack. Entitled "A White Awakening", it supported white nationalism, expressed hatred towards Muslims, and called for an end to multiculturalism.

== Legal proceedings ==
The trial was the first murder trial in Canada involving terrorism charges.

Shortly after the attack, Crown attorneys charged Veltman with four counts of first-degree murder and one count of attempted murder. He made a court appearance in London on June 10, without a lawyer, so was given time to find one. On June 14, the charges were all upgraded to include terrorism, and the court adjourned until June 21. Many details of the case remained under a publication ban until the jury's verdict was pronounced.

On July 25, 2022, the presiding judge ruled that the trial should be moved from London owing to the intense, emotional local media coverage the case received and concerns that an impartial jury would be difficult to select in London. In January 2023, Regional Senior Justice Bruce Thomas would schedule a 12-week trial for September 2023 in Windsor, Ontario.

The trial began on September 5, 2023, with Veltman pleading not guilty to all charges.

On November 16, 2023, the end of testimony and sequestering of the jury for deliberations led to a lifting on a publication ban on evidence withheld in the trial. After six hours of deliberation, the jury found Veltman guilty of four counts of first-degree murder and one count of attempted murder. As the verdict was read out, gasps and sobs of the victim's family sounded in the full courtroom. The verdict comes with minimum sentence of 25 years in prison.

Following the verdict, the defending lawyer for Veltman said his client was "in shock" because of the long prison term that awaits him.

In a hearing on December 1, 2023, the judge scheduled a sentencing hearing in London for January 4 and 5, 2024. It's expected that the hearings will include 68 victim impact statements as well as findings of fact from the judge on terrorism charges that could determine the eligibility of the perpetrator for parole.

On February 22, 2024, Justice Renee Pomerance ruled Veltman's crimes constituted "terrorist activity", describing them as a "textbook case", and sentenced him to five life sentences, four of them with no possibility of parole for 25 years. One of the life sentences was in connection with the attempted murder of the lone survivor of the attack.

Veltman appealed the case on June 6, 2025, making three claims:

1. That the judge erred in admitting the ideological evidence, including Veltman's white supremacist manifesto, titled "A White Awakening," which set out his political and racist views;
2. That the judge erred in admitting Veltman's statements to a police officer which were obtained via a "Charter breach," meaning he was not properly warned of his rights;
3. That the judge erred in refusing the defence application for a mistrial because of what Veltman's lawyer at the time called "inflammatory language" during the Crown's closing statement, including references to the crime scene and the grievous injuries suffered by the victims.

== Reactions ==
The House of Commons held a moment of silence for the victims. The attack was condemned by Prime Minister Justin Trudeau, the Islamic Supreme Council of Canada, Calgary mayor Naheed Nenshi, the National Council of Canadian Muslims and Prime Minister of Pakistan Imran Khan all of whom called it an act of terrorism motivated by hatred. All parties in the Canadian parliament agreed to call "an emergency national action summit to tackle Islamophobia."

A vigil was held on June 8, at the London Muslim Mosque. Premier of Ontario Doug Ford temporarily lifted provincial COVID-19 restrictions in London for it to proceed. Trudeau, Ford and London mayor Ed Holder attended, among thousands more. On June 12, a public funeral was held with hundreds in attendance.

In June 2022, the city of London and other organizations organized an event in honour of those killed as well as to generate awareness about Islamophobia. Over 1,000 people attended the event, including Prime Minister Trudeau.

== See also ==
- Islamophobia in Canada
- 2018 Toronto van attack
- 2017 Quebec City mosque shooting
- 2025 Vancouver car attack
