= Motion 312 =

2012 motion introduced to the Parliament of Canada

Motion 312 was a motion introduced to the Parliament of Canada by Stephen Woodworth, MP for Kitchener Centre, in 2012.

M-312 called for the formation of a committee "to review the declaration in Subsection 223(1) of the Criminal Code which states that a child becomes a human being only at the moment of complete birth".

== Reception ==
=== Support ===
Groups opposing legal abortion, such as the Campaign Life Coalition, supported Motion 312.

=== Opposition ===
Groups supporting legal abortion, such as the Abortion Rights Coalition of Canada, opposed Motion 312.

Numerous labour unions in Canada opposed Motion 312. This includes the Canadian Union of Public Employees (CUPE) and the Telecommunications Workers Union (TWU).

== Results ==
Motion 312 was defeated with a vote of 203–91 against.

Choice							Total
Choice	Conservative	NDP	Liberal	Bloc Québécois	Green	Independent	Total
Nays	74	96	28	3	1	1	203
Yeas	86	0	4	0	0	1	91
Did Not Vote	2	4	3	1	0	0	10
Grand total	162	100	35	4	1	2	305
