= Karen Redman =

Canadian politician (born 1953)

The Honourable Karen Redman PC
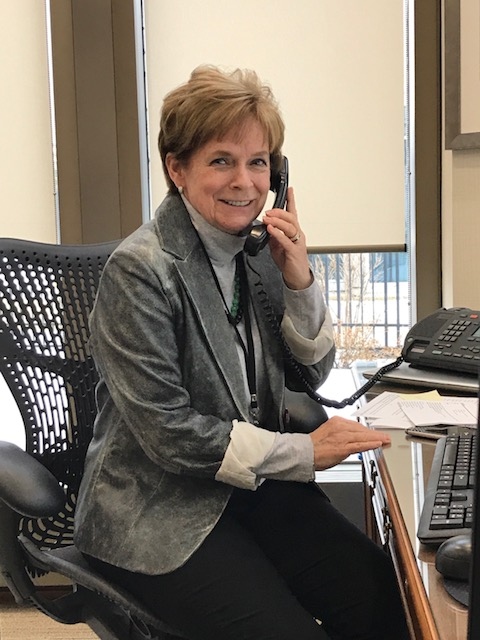
- Redman in 2019

Chair of the Region of Waterloo
- Incumbent
- Assumed office November 30, 2018
- Preceded by: Ken Seiling

Member of Parliament for Kitchener Centre
- In office June 2, 1997 – October 14, 2008
- Preceded by: John English
- Succeeded by: Stephen Woodworth

Personal details
- Born: Karen Longo; January 8, 1953 (age 73) Kitchener, Ontario, Canada
- Party: Independent
- Other political affiliations: Liberal (until 2014)
- Spouse: Warren Redman

Karen Redman PC (née Longo; born January 8, 1953) is a Canadian politician who currently serves as the chair of the Region of Waterloo. Previously, she was a member of the House of Commons of Canada from 1997 to 2008, representing the riding of Kitchener Centre for the Liberal Party. She served as Chief Government Whip in the 2004 to 2005 Parliament, and was the Chief Official Opposition Whip in the 2006 to 2008 parliament. She was defeated in the 2008 federal election. She was elected to Waterloo Regional Council in the 2014 municipal election and has been the Waterloo Regional Chair since 2018.

== Life and career ==
Redman was born in Kitchener, Ontario. After completing high school at Eastwood Collegiate Institute, Redman went on to graduate from the University of Waterloo, receiving a Bachelor of Arts degree in English in 1974. She subsequently worked as a writer, and was a member of the Kitchener-Waterloo Learning Disabilities Association and the Canadian Federation of University Women. She has been an elder in Kitchener's St. Andrew's Presbyterian Church since 1991.

=== Politics ===
Redman served as a trustee on the Waterloo County Board of Education from 1988 to 1994, and was a city councillor for the Kitchener City Council and the Regional Municipality of Waterloo from 1994 to 1997.

She was first elected to parliament in the federal election of 1997, defeating former Progressive Conservative MP John Reimer by over 10,000 votes. She was re-elected by comfortable margins in the elections of 2000, 2004, and 2006.

Redman served as parliamentary secretary to the Minister of the Environment from 2000 to 2003. She was named Chief Government Whip and sworn into the Queen's Privy Council for Canada on July 20, 2004, an important role in a minority government situation. Following the Liberal defeat in the 2006 election, she was named Chief Opposition Whip.

In the 2008 federal election, she lost to Stephen Woodworth of the Conservative Party of Canada by 339 votes.

On November 17, 2009, upon a reconstitution of the Office of the Leader of the Official Opposition under Chief of Staff Peter Donolo, Redman was named Caucus Liaison, a role drawing on her "strong and deep ties with her former – and future – caucus colleagues."

Redman was renominated as the federal Liberal candidate for the riding of Kitchener Centre in the 2011 election, yet lost again to Conservative Stephen Woodworth.

She was elected to Waterloo Regional Council in the 2014 municipal election. In 2018 she successfully ran for and became the chair of the Waterloo Regional Council, receiving over 62% of the votes.

== Election results ==
Waterloo Region - Regional Councillor for the City of Kitchener, 2014 (Note: Four positions available)
Candidate	Votes
Karen Redman	28,616
Tom Galloway	24,866
Wayne Wettlaufer	17,471
Geoff Lorentz	17,005
Elizabeth Clarke	16,586
Cameron J. Dearlove	14,439
Greg Burns	8,331

2011 Canadian federal election
Party	Candidate	Votes	%	±%	Expenditures
Conservative	Stephen Woodworth	21,119	42.40	+5.70	$84,217.49
Liberal	Karen Redman	15,592	31.30	-4.64	$79,800.33
New Democratic	Peter Thurley	10,742	21.57	+3.48	$38,822.94
Green	Byron Williston	1,972	3.96	-4.55	$4,298.33
Independent	Alan Rimmer	199	0.40		$1,916.45
Communist	Martin Suter	93	0.19	-0.10	$502.09
Marxist–Leninist	Mark Corbiere	92	0.18	–	none listed
Total valid votes/expense limit		49,809	99.58	$87,274.51	
Total rejected ballots		209	0.42	+0.01	
Turnout		50,018	63.15	+5.12	
Eligible voters		80,480	–	–	
Conservative hold		Swing		+5.17	

2008 Canadian federal election
Party	Candidate	Votes	%	±%	Expenditures
Conservative	Stephen Woodworth	16,480	36.69	+4.56	$75,291
Liberal	Karen Redman	16,141	35.94	-7.32	$74,745
New Democratic	Oz Cole-Arnal	8,152	18.08	-0.35	$26,622
Green	John Bithell	3,818	8.51	+2.89	$2,612
Independent	Amanda Lamka	215	0.47	–	
Communist	Martin Suter	127	0.28	-0.26	$373
Total valid votes/expense limit		44,933	100.00	$84,756	
Total rejected ballots		183	0.41	-0.05	
Turnout		45,091	57.03	-7.67	
Conservative gain from Liberal		Swing		+5.94	

2006 Canadian federal election
Party	Candidate	Votes	%	±%
Liberal	Karen Redman	21,715	43.26	-3.8
Conservative	Steven Cage	16,131	32.13	+4.6
New Democratic	Richard Walsh-Bowers	9,250	18.43	-0.9
Green	Tony Maas	2,822	5.62	+0.2
Communist	Martin Suter	274	0.54	
Total valid votes		50,192	100.00	
Total rejected ballots		232	0.46	
Turnout		50,426	64.70	

2004 Canadian federal election
Party	Candidate	Votes	%	±%
Liberal	Karen Redman	21,264	47.1	-5.7
Conservative	Thomas Ichim	12,412	27.5	-12.4 (Note: Conservative vote is compared to the total of the Canadian Alliance vote and Progressive Conservative vote in 2000 election.)
New Democratic	Richard Walsh-Bowers	8,717	19.3	+12.4
Green	Karol Vesely	2,450	5.4	
Independent	Mark Corbiere	277	0.6	
Total valid votes		45,120	100.0	

2000 Canadian federal election
Party	Candidate	Votes	%	±%
Liberal	Karen Redman	23,511	52.8	+4.8
Alliance	Eloise Jantzi	11,603	26.1	+6.2 (Note: Canadian Alliance vote is compared to the Reform vote in 1997 election.)
Progressive Conservative	Steven Daniel Gadbois	6,162	13.8	-8.9
New Democratic	Paul Royston	3,058	6.9	-2.5
Communist	Martin Suter	167	0.4	
Total valid votes		44,501	100.0	

1997 Canadian federal election
Party	Candidate	Votes	%
Liberal	Karen Redman	23,089	48.0
Progressive Conservative	John Reimer	10,960	22.8
Reform	Ronald Albert Wilson	9,550	19.9
New Democratic	Lucy Harrison	4,503	9.4
Total valid votes		48,102	100.0

== See also ==
- List of University of Waterloo people
