= Raj Saini =

Canadian politician

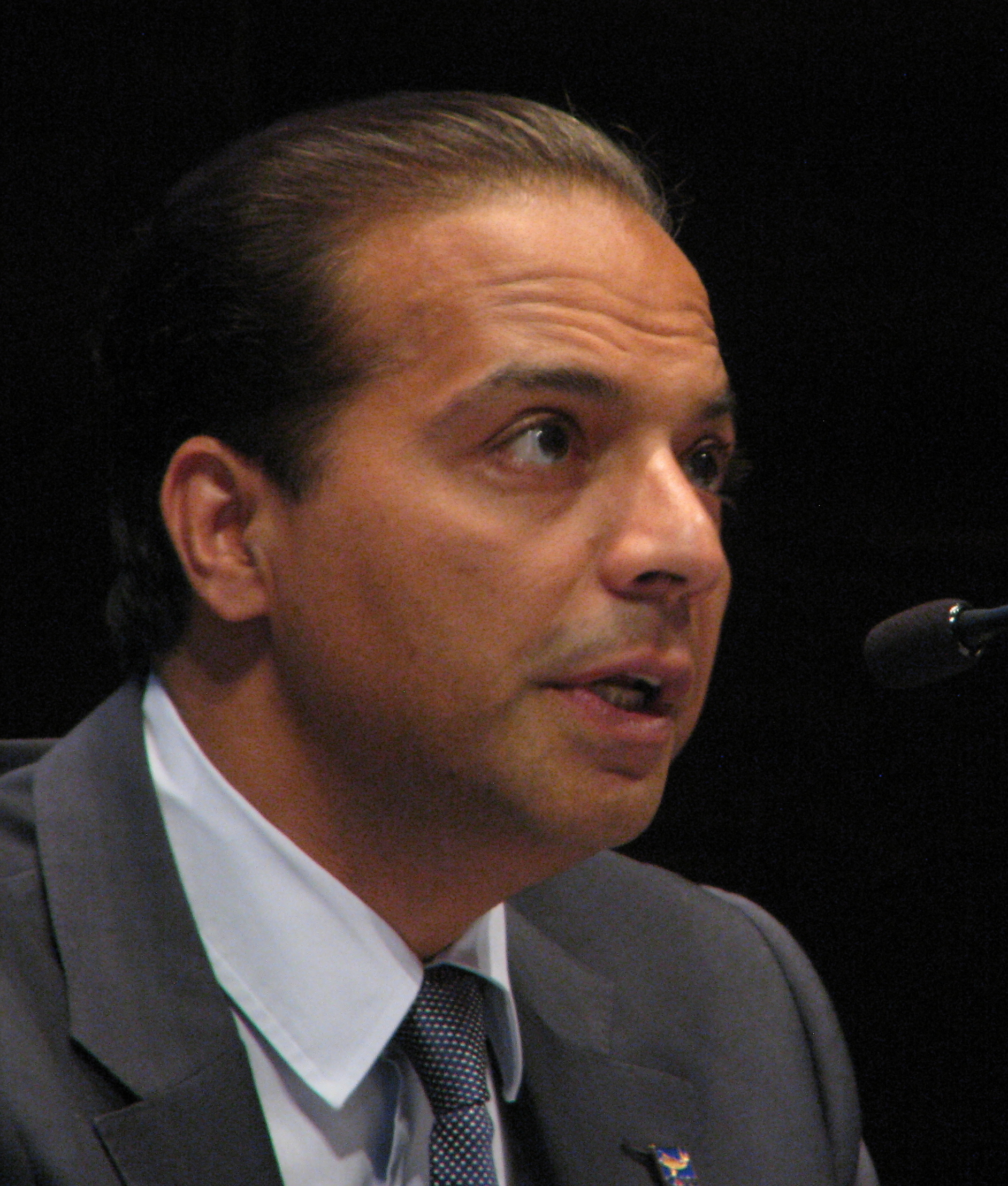
- Raj Saini at the Waterloo Region CARP Debate at CIGI

Member of Parliament for Kitchener Centre
- In office October 19, 2015 – September 20, 2021
- Preceded by: Stephen Woodworth
- Succeeded by: Mike Morrice

Personal details
- Born: August 21, 1967 (age 59) Bhiura or Balh, Himachal Pradesh, India
- Party: Liberal
- Profession: Businessman

Rajinder "Raj" Saini (born August 21, 1967) is an Indian-Canadian politician who served as the member of Parliament (MP) for the riding of Kitchener Centre in the House of Commons of Canada from 2015 to 2021.

== Background ==
Saini's political leanings were formed growing up in a Liberal household in Mississauga in the 1970s and 1980s, and later as a student at the University of Toronto, where he completed a bachelor of science before going on to complete a Bachelor of Science in pharmacy at Boston's Northeastern University.

== Early career ==
Prior to becoming a Member of Parliament, Saini was a pharmacist, having moved to Kitchener to start Greenbrook Pharmacy, a local independent business which he has co-owned and operated for more than 20 years. Prior to becoming an elected official, Saini had long been involved in both his community and the Liberal Party. He is a past president and past vice-president of the Kitchener Centre Federal Liberal Association, a Rotarian, and has served as a member of the Canadian International Council, Waterloo.

== Political career ==
Saini was first elected to Parliament in the 2015 federal election. He said that one of his top priorities for his time in Ottawa would be addressing Canada's need for a national pharmacare policy. He was a member of two parliamentary committees, the Foreign Affairs and International Development Committee, as well as the Access to Information, Privacy, and Ethics Committee. Reflecting an interest in Foreign Affairs, Saini was a member of multiple Parliamentary Associations and Parliamentary Friendship Groups, including the Canada-Europe Parliamentary Association, the Canada-Israel Interparliamentary Group, the Canada-United States Inter-Parliamentary Group, the Canadian Branch of the Commonwealth Parliamentary Association (CPA), the Canadian Delegation to the Organization for Security and Co-operation in Europe Parliamentary Assembly (OSCE PA), and the Canadian NATO Parliamentary Association (NATO PA). He was also an executive member of the Canada-Germany Interparliamentary Group.

Saini spoke in the House of Commons on topics including the International Day for Tolerance, Public Safety Canada, the National Security and Intelligence Committee of Parliamentarians, and Canada's efforts to combat ISIL.

== Sexual harassment allegations ==
In 2021, allegations emerged that Saini engaged in inappropriate behaviour including unwanted sexual advances towards female staffers on four occasions. On September 4, Saini announced he was ending his campaign for re-election, denying any wrongdoing. Saini did not withdraw his candidacy prior to the close of nominations and his name remained on the ballot as the Liberal candidate for the September 20 vote.

Regarding the alleged incidents, Saini had been cleared of wrongdoing by a workplace assessment independently commissioned by the House of Commons in the spring of 2020. The workplace assessment concluded that the staffer making the allegations was "creating a toxic environment and many staff and the MP report strained relationships with her" and recommended that "the employment relationship may need to be reconsidered ... in order to ensure a safe and healthy work environment for the remainder of the staff." The staffer who made the allegations had her employment terminated with cause in August 2020 by the House of Commons. Saini was advised to seek a restraining order against the staffer by the Office of the Law Clerk and Parliamentary Counsel, though he refused.

== Electoral record ==
2021 Canadian federal election: Kitchener Centre
Party	Candidate	Votes	%	±%	Expenditures
Green	Mike Morrice	17,872	34.9	+8.9	$110,414.01
Conservative	Mary Henein Thorn	12,537	24.5	+0.5	$71,022.32
New Democratic	Beisan Zubi	8,938	17.5	+6.2	$43,723.62
Liberal	Raj Saini (Note: Saini withdrew his candidacy, but after closure of nominations, so remained listed as the Liberal candidate on the ballot.)	8,297	16.2	-20.5	$70,160.14
People's	Diane Boskovic	3,381	6.6	+4.7	$2,346.29
Animal Protection	Ellen Papenburg	154	0.3	+0	$8,074.38
Total valid votes/expense limit		51,179	98.81	-0.36	$112,017.63
Total rejected ballots		525	1.02	+0.19	
Turnout		51,275	62.41	–	
Eligible voters		82,159	–	–	
Green gain from Liberal		Swing		+9.28	
Source: Elections Canada

2019 Canadian federal election: Kitchener Centre
Party	Candidate	Votes	%	±%	Expenditures
Liberal	Raj Saini	20,316	36.69	-12.09	$71,251.01
Green	Mike Morrice	14,394	25.99	+22.94	$72,289.70
Conservative	Stephen Woodworth	13,191	23.82	-6.54	$86,969.26
New Democratic	Andrew Moraga	6,238	11.27	-5.34	$15,354.69
People's	Patrick Bernier	1,033	1.87	–	none listed
Animal Protection	Ellen Papenburg	202	0.36	–	none listed
Total valid votes/expense limit		55,374	99.17	-0.28	
Total rejected ballots		465	0.83	+0.28	
Turnout		55,839	66.57	-0.93	
Eligible voters		83,884	–	–	
Liberal hold		Swing		-17.52	
Source: Elections Canada

2015 Canadian federal election
Party	Candidate	Votes	%	±%	Expenditures
Liberal	Raj Saini	25,504	48.78	+16.49	$100,662.46
Conservative	Stephen Woodworth	15,872	30.36	-10.00	$126,009.07
New Democratic	Susan Cadell	8,680	16.60	-5.32	$58,064.50
Green	Nicholas Wendler	1,597	3.05	-1.52	$1,292.98
Libertarian	Slavko Miladinovic	515	0.99	–	–
Marxist–Leninist	Julian Ichim	112	0.21	–	–
Total valid votes/Expense limit		52,280	100.00		$209,331.18
Total rejected ballots		292	0.56	–	
Turnout		52,572	68.46		
Eligible voters		76,797			
Liberal gain from Conservative		Swing		+13.25	
Source: Elections Canada
