= Special Representative on Combatting Islamophobia =

Canadian government role

- Représentant(e) spécial(e) chargé(e) de la lutte contre l'islamophobie
- Status: Office Abolished
- Appointer: Prime Minister of Canada
- Term length: 4 years
- Formation: 2023
- First holder: Amira Elghawaby
- Abolished: 2026
- Succession: Advisory Council on Rights, Equality and Inclusion

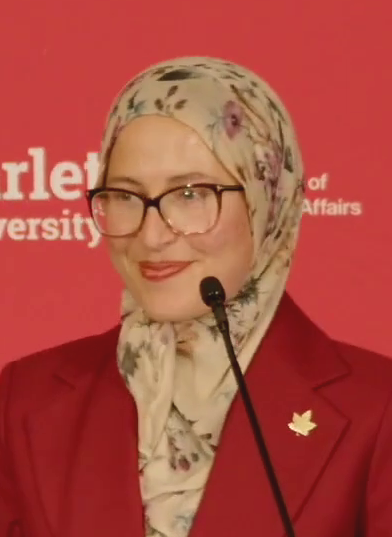
Amira Elghawaby

The Special Representative on Combatting Islamophobia was a Canadian federal government office created in January 2023.

== Description ==
The Special Representative on Combatting Islamophobia role is a four year term, appointed by the federal government of Canada.

== History ==
In June 2022, the federal government of Canada announced plans to create the office.

On January 26, 2023, Prime Minister Justin Trudeau appointed Amira Elghawaby as Canada's first representative. The office was allocated a budget of $5.6 million to cover the first five years of activities.

The office was abolished by the Carney government in February 2026 in favour of a new Advisory Council on Rights, Equality and Inclusion.
