= Stephen Woodworth (politician) =

Canadian politician

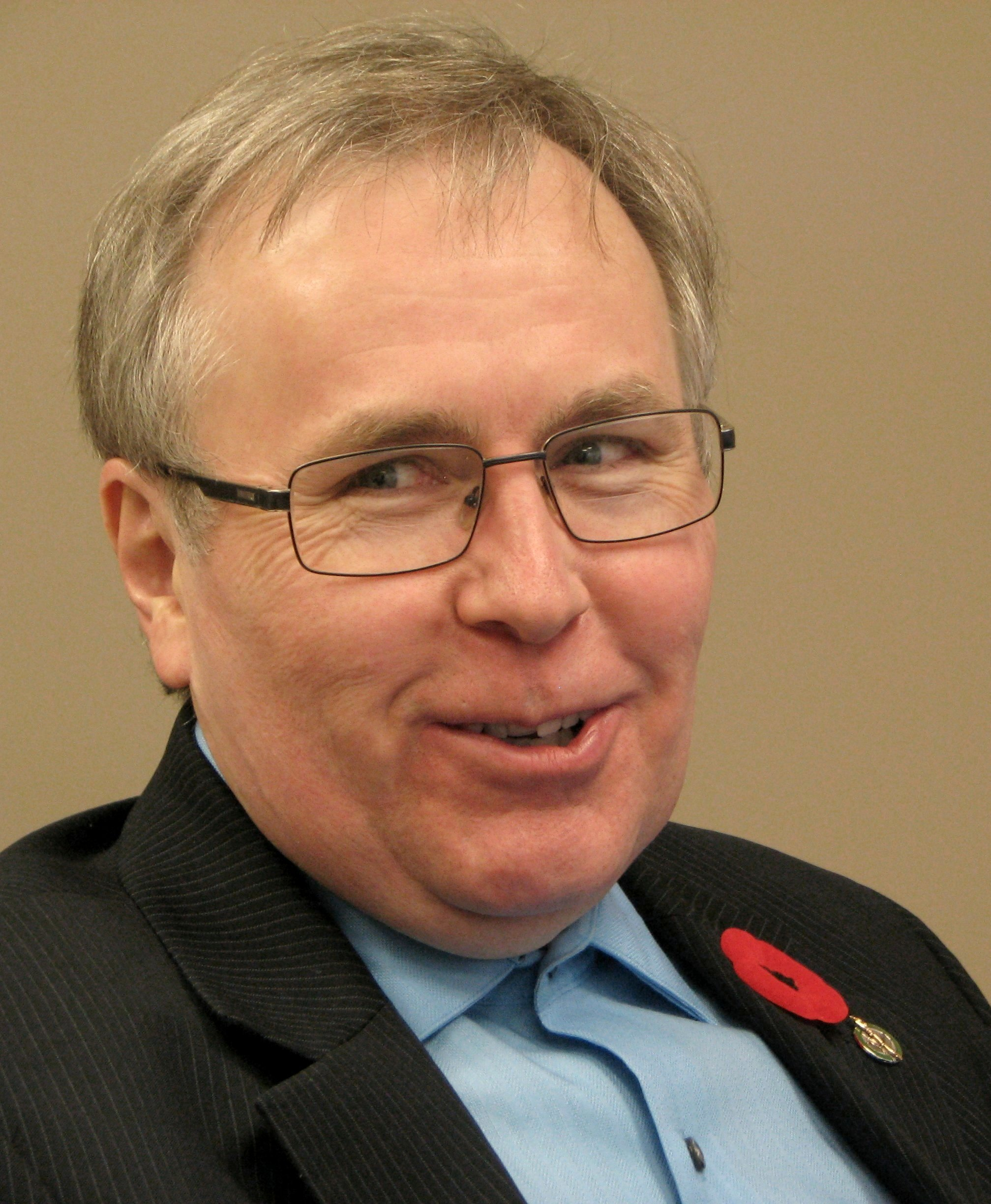
- Stephen Woodworth, 2013

Member of Parliament for Kitchener Centre
- In office October 14, 2008 – October 19, 2015
- Preceded by: Karen Redman
- Succeeded by: Raj Saini

Personal details
- Born: January 5, 1954 (age 72) Kitchener, Ontario
- Party: Conservative (2008–present), Liberal (1988–93)
- Profession: Lawyer

Stephen Woodworth (born January 5, 1954) is a Canadian politician. He represented the electoral district of Kitchener Centre in the House of Commons of Canada for the Conservative Party of Canada in the 40th and 41st Parliaments (2008–2015).

== Politics and elected office ==
Woodworth first ran for public office in the 1988 federal election, representing the Liberal Party in the riding of Waterloo, finishing second to veteran Progressive Conservative MP Walter McLean. For the 1993 federal election, he again sought the Liberal nomination in Waterloo, but this time lost to Andrew Telegdi.

In 1994, Woodworth was elected to the Waterloo Catholic District School Board, representing Kitchener, and served in that capacity until 2003. During his tenure, Woodworth fought to prevent sex education from being taught in local Catholic high schools.

In the 2008 Canadian federal election, Woodworth ran for the Conservative Party of Canada and was elected as an MP for Kitchener Centre, defeating incumbent Liberal Karen Redman by a margin of 339 votes. He was re-elected in 2011, topping Redman by more than 5,500 votes in a rematch of the 2008 contest.

As an MP, Woodworth served as a member of several parliamentary committees, including the committees for Environment and Sustainable Development, Justice and Human Rights, Public Accounts, and Fisheries and Oceans.

=== Abortion debate ===
In 2012, Woodworth introduced Motion 312, a private member's motion that attempted to reopen the debate around Canadian abortion law. The bill proposed to create a special committee to redefine Canada's legal definition of human being. The motion was defeated 203–91.

In 2013, Woodworth followed up with a second private member's motion, Motion 476, again attempting to challenge Canada's abortion laws. However, Woodworth failed to receive the unanimous consent of Parliament required to reopen the debate after his previous motion was defeated.

=== After Parliament ===
In the 2015 Canadian federal election, Woodworth lost his seat to Liberal candidate Raj Saini by a margin of nearly 10,000 votes. He attempted a political comeback at Kitchener Centre in the 2019 federal election, placing third behind incumbent Saini and Green Party candidate Mike Morrice.

== Electoral record ==
2019 Canadian federal election: Kitchener Centre
Party	Candidate	Votes	%	±%	Expenditures
Liberal	Raj Saini	20,316	36.69	-12.09	$71,251.01
Green	Mike Morrice	14,394	25.99	+22.94	$72,289.70
Conservative	Stephen Woodworth	13,191	23.82	-6.54	$86,969.26
New Democratic	Andrew Moraga	6,238	11.27	-5.34	$15,354.69
People's	Patrick Bernier	1,033	1.87	–	none listed
Animal Protection	Ellen Papenburg	202	0.36	–	none listed
Total valid votes/expense limit		55,374	99.17	-0.28	
Total rejected ballots		465	0.83	+0.28	
Turnout		55,839	66.57	-0.93	
Eligible voters		83,884	–	–	
Liberal hold		Swing		-17.52	
Source: Elections Canada

2015 Canadian federal election: Kitchener Centre
Party	Candidate	Votes	%	±%	Expenditures
Liberal	Raj Saini	25,504	48.8	+16.51	–
Conservative	Stephen Woodworth	15,872	30.4	-9.96	–
New Democratic	Susan Cadell	8,680	16.6	-5.33	–
Green	Nicholas Wendler	1,597	3.1	-1.48	–
Libertarian	Slavko Miladinovic	515	1.0	–	–
Marxist–Leninist	Julian Ichim	112	0.2	+0.02	–
Total valid votes/Expense limit		52,280	100.0		$209,331.18
Total rejected ballots		292	–	–	
Turnout		52,572	68.45	+5.32	
Eligible voters		76,797			
Liberal gain from Conservative		Swing		+13.24	
Source: Elections Canada

2011 Canadian federal election: Kitchener Centre
Party	Candidate	Votes	%	±%	Expenditures
Conservative	Stephen Woodworth	21,119	42.39	+5.70	–
Liberal	Karen Redman	15,592	31.30	-4.64	–
New Democratic	Peter Thurley	10,742	21.56	+3.48	$38,822.94
Green	Byron Williston	1,972	3.95	+1.06	–
Independent	Alan Rimmer	199	0.39	-0.08	–
Communist	Martin Suter	93	0.19	-0.09	–
Marxist–Leninist	Mark Corbiere	92	0.18	–	none listed
Total valid votes/Expense limit		49,809	100.00	$87,274.51	
Total rejected ballots		209	0.42	+0.01	
Turnout		50,018	63.13	+6.10	
Eligible voters		79,232	–	–	

2008 Canadian federal election: Kitchener Centre
Party	Candidate	Votes	%	±%	Expenditures
Conservative	Stephen Woodworth	16,480	36.69	+4.56	$75,291
Liberal	Karen Redman	16,141	35.94	-7.32	$74,745
New Democratic	Oz Cole-Arnal	8,152	18.08	-0.35	$26,622
Green	John Bithell	3,818	8.51	+2.89	$2,612
Independent	Amanda Lamka	215	0.47	–	
Communist	Martin Suter	127	0.28	-0.26	$373
Total valid votes/Expense limit		44,933	100.00	$84,756	
Total rejected ballots		183	0.41	-0.05	
Turnout		45,091	57.03	-7.67	
Conservative gain from Liberal		Swing		+5.94	

1988 Canadian federal election: Kitchener Centre
Party	Candidate	Votes	%	±%
Progressive Conservative	Walter McLean	26,949	45.11	–11.24
Liberal	Stephen Woodworth	21,715	36.35	+11.78
New Democratic	Scott Piatkowski	10,418	17.44	–0.71
Libertarian	Rita Huschka-Sprague	663	1.11	+0.18
Total valid votes		59,745	100.0	
Progressive Conservative hold		Swing		–11.51
