= Islamophobia in Canada =

Prejudice towards Islam or Muslims in Canada

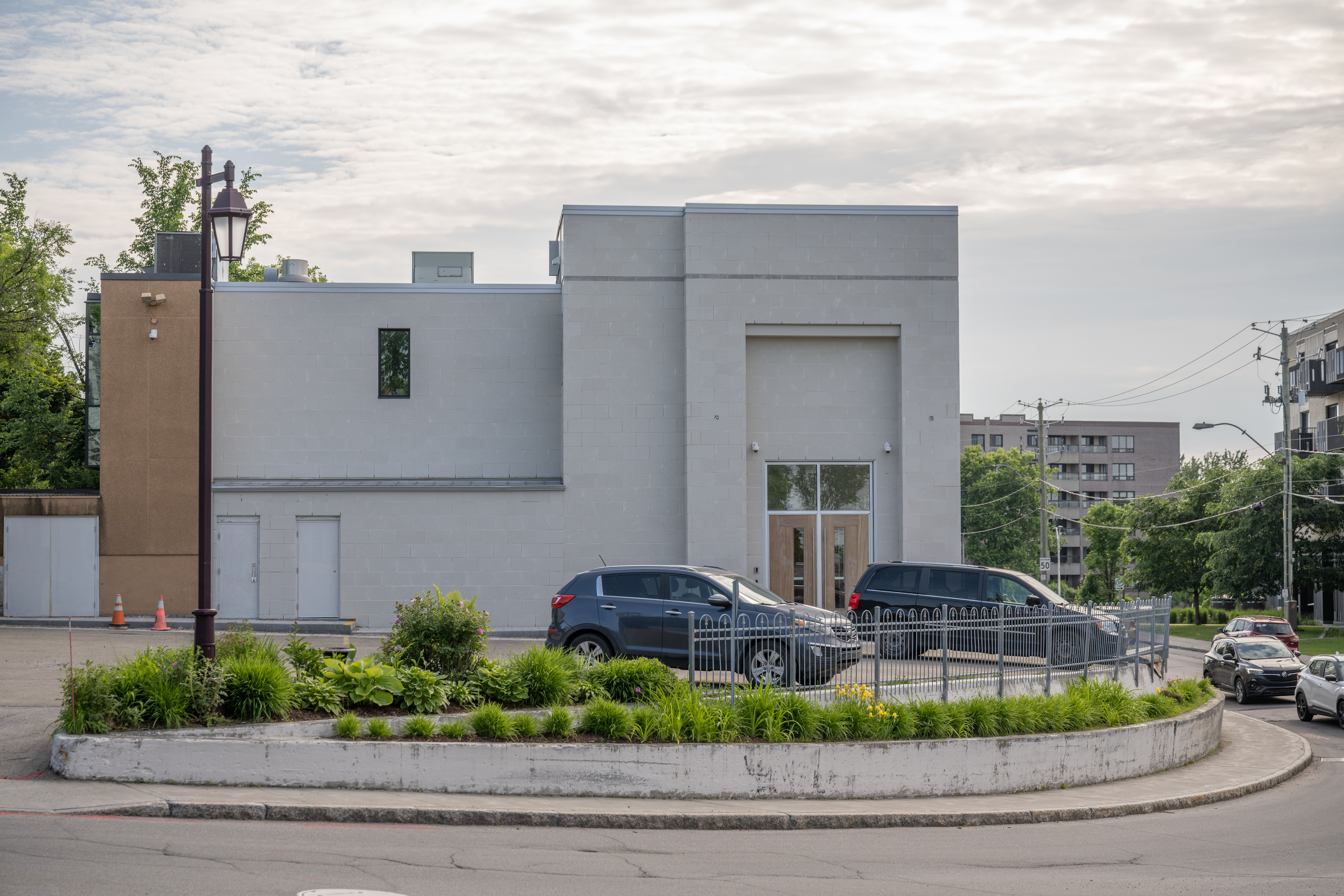
The Quebec Islamic Cultural Centre was the target of a mass shooting in January 2017.

Islamophobia in Canada refers to a set of discourses, behaviours and structures which express feelings of anxiety, fear, hostility and rejection towards Islam or Muslims in Canada.

Particularly since the September 11 attacks in the United States in 2001, a variety of surveys and polls, as well as reported incidents, have consistently given credence to the existence of Islamophobia in Canada. The number of police-reported hate crimes targeting Muslims in Canada more than tripled between 2012 and 2015, despite the overall number of such crimes decreasing over the same period, according to Statistics Canada data. Statistics Canada does state, however, that "an increase in numbers may be related to more reporting by the public".

The number of Islamophobic incidents significantly increased in 2015 and 2016; in 2015, police across the country recorded 159 hate crimes targeted at Muslims, up from 45 in 2012, representing an increase of 253%.

In January 2017, six Muslims were killed in a shooting attack at a Quebec City mosque. Islamophobia has manifested itself as vandalism of mosques and physical assaults on Muslims, including violence against Muslim women wearing the hijab or niqab. Islamophobia has been condemned by Canadian governments on the federal, provincial and municipal levels.

In June 2021, five members of a Muslim family were the victims of a domestic attack in the city of London, Ontario. Four members died as a result of this attack, leaving the fifth, a 9-year old boy, with severe injuries. The act was reported as premeditated and motivated by anti-Muslim hate.

The Canadian media have played a mixed role in their coverage of Islamophobia, and have been described as having perpetuated it and/or countered it for Canadian audiences. Canada's public education system has also been scrutinized for its role as the site of Islamophobic incidents and of the development of Islamophobic attitudes in youth.

== History ==
Although Canadian Islamophobia had been documented in the 20th century, it rapidly increased in the 21st century, corresponding to increases in Muslim immigration. The majority of documented cases have occurred during conflict between the U.S. and elements of the Muslim world. Such incidents also spike after incidents of Islamic terrorism in North America or other parts of the Western world. Canadians with Middle Eastern backgrounds have been victimized by Islamophobia in the context of the September 11 attacks and the resulting war on terrorism. Islamophobia has often played on the theme of deeming Muslims as irrational and violent, and Muslims as bent upon global domination. There was a significant spike in hate crimes against Muslims in Toronto in the aftermath of the 9/11 attacks. The types of incidents included physical threats and destruction of property. In 2014, two incidents occurred, a vehicle ramming attack, and later a shooting at Parliament Hill. The latter was later attributed to mental illness, however then-Prime Minister Stephen Harper and opposition leader Justin Trudeau referred to it as terrorism. Also the dramatic increase in numbers of Syrian refugees in 2016 created negative feelings and an increase in Islamophobic attacks and harassment. An upsurge in immigrants from India from around 2014 also contributed to an increased spread of Indian-origin anti-islamic sentiments forwarded via mobile messaging as part of Hindutva disinformation campaigns supported by the ruling Bharatiya Janata Party.

In many cases, non-Muslims and non-Muslim buildings are targeted by Islamophobes due to mistaken identity.

Sharia law is explicitly banned in Quebec, upheld by a unanimous vote against it in 2005 by the National Assembly.

== Hate crimes ==
NCCM's database of hate crimes against Muslims in Canada
Year	Physical assaults	Attacks on property (including mosques)
2012	1	8
2013	6	3
2014	5	15
2015	9	20
Note: NCCM only documents a fraction of anti-Muslim hate crimes and their database may differ from those of various police forces across Canada.

Police forces from across Canada have reported that Muslims are the second most targeted religious group, after Jews. And while hate crimes against all religious groups have decreased, hate crimes against Muslims have increased following 9/11. In 2012, police forces from across Canada recorded 45 hate crimes against Muslims that were deemed to be "religiously motivated". By 2014, this number had more than doubled to 99.

In 2015, the city of Toronto reported a similar trend: hate crimes in general decreased by 8.2%, but hate crimes against Muslims had increased. Police hypothesized the spike could be due to the Paris attacks or anger over refugees. Muslims faced the third highest level of hate crimes in Toronto, after Jews and the LGBTQ community.

During the COVID-19 pandemic, Canada saw a sudden rise in hate crimes based on race, religion, and sexual orientation. Statistics Canada reported there was a 72% increase in hate crimes between 2019 and 2021.

=== Assaults ===
Many Islamophobic incidents have involved violent attacks on Muslims, sometimes resulting in physical injuries that require hospitalization. Many of the incidents revolve around Muslim women who wear the hijab or niqab.

On September 26, 2014, six Muslim students at Queen's University were attacked by four men, one of whom wielded a baseball bat and who yelled various racial epithets. One of the students suffered minor physical injuries. The police arrested two men in connection to the attack and charged them with assault.

In May 2016, an Iranian student at Western University was physically attacked and called an "Arab"; the student suffered a concussion as a result of the attack. The attackers also uttered threats against his girlfriend. The mayor of London said the attack was a "wake-up call" and that "Islamophobia had no place in Canada".

=== Violence against Muslim women ===
Many Muslim women have been subjected to acts of violence, particularly those who are visibly Muslim due to them wearing the hijab or niqab.

In 2011, a Muslim woman wearing the niqab was with her children when she was attacked at a Mississauga mall; the attacker screamed at her and pulled off her veil. After the court was shown mall security footage of the assault, the attacker pleaded guilty to assault. The incident was deemed Islamophobic by the Ontario Human Rights Commission.

In the aftermath of the 2013 Quebec Charter of Values, many Muslim women wearing the headscarf were attacked. On September 17, a 17-year old Muslim girl was attacked in St. Catharines. She was punched in the nose, that left her bleeding and her headscarf was pulled off. In November, a woman wearing the hijab in Montreal was attacked by two men; one of them spat on her, while the other pulled off her headscarf. In December, a woman wearing a hijab was attacked when another woman tried to forcibly remove her headscarf from her head.

In September 2015, a pregnant woman wearing the hijab was attacked by teenagers in Toronto, when they tried to pull off her headscarf, causing her to fall. Quebec's National Assembly responded by passing a unanimous resolution against Islamophobia.

In December 2020, two Muslim women in hijab were attacked by a 41 year old man in an Edmonton mall parking lot. According to witnesses, the man started out shouting racially motivated obscenities at them, then shattered one of the glass windows in their car, and then physically assaulted them in the parking lot as one of them tried to run away. Fortunately, several bystanders intervened and stopped the attack.

On April 9, 2023, A 32 year old man was arrested after braking-in the Al-Omah Al- Islamic mosque on Saint-Dominique Streat. He was charged with assault with a weapon and mischief. He was caught on camera using a rock to break into the mosque and the prayer room. No one was injured, but the muslins leaders criticized authorities response to the incident for not had consider it a hate crime.

=== Attacks on mosques ===
Mosques in Canada have been the target of many Islamophobic attacks. The types of attacks usually consist of breaking windows and doors or spray painting hateful messages onto the mosque.

On December 31, 2013, a bomb threat was made against a Vancouver mosque and the building was evacuated by the RCMP. On November 26, 2014, a bomb threat was made against a Montreal mosque and the police found a suspicious package. 12 buildings in the area were evacuated until the police neutralized the package.

On May 20, 2014, a man tried to throw a Molotov cocktail through the window of a mosque in Montreal, but was stopped by the police. The police had been watching the mosque because it had already been the target of multiple attacks.

On November 14, 2015, a day after the Paris attacks, the only mosque in Peterborough, Ontario was set on fire. Police deemed the arson a hate crime.

On October 12, 2020, Toronto Police confirmed they were investigating threats being made against a local mosque. The messages received by the mosque included the threat to “do a Christ church all over again,” referring to the attacks on two mosques in Christchurch, New Zealand, in March 2019 in which a gunman killed 51 people.

=== Quebec City mosque shooting ===
In January 2017, a gunman opened fire upon worshipers in the Islamic Cultural Center of Quebec, killing 6 and wounding 19 others. The media reported that the attacker was a university student who had right-wing and anti-Muslim political tendencies. Many Muslims and non-Muslims blamed the attack on the rise in Islamophobic rhetoric in Canada.

=== Toronto mosque volunteer murder ===
On 12 September 2020, Mohamed-Aslim Zafis, a volunteer at the International Muslim Organization, was stabbed in the neck while he was sitting outside the mosque. Toronto Police arrested and charged 34 year old Guilherme "William" Von Neutegem with first degree murder.

Von Neutegem had shared content from a satanic neo-Nazi group in social media posts, according to an organization that tracks online extremism. This revelation has further fueled calls for the killing to be investigated as a hate crime, something the Toronto Police Service was considering. Furthermore, many Canadian Human rights organizations (led by National Council of Canadian Muslims) sent an open letter to Prime Minister Justin Trudeau calling on the federal government to establish a national action plan on dismantling white supremacist and neo-Nazi groups that threaten Canadians who are Black, Indigenous, Jewish, Muslim, or Sikh, amongst other communities.

=== Afzaal family killing in London, Ontario ===
On 6 June 2021, the Afzaal family, Salman (46), his mother Talat (74), his wife Madiha (44), daughter Yumna (15), and son Fayez (9), were out for a walk when they were struck by a pick-up truck. The entire family died except for Fayez who was hospitalized for serious but not life-threatening injuries. London Police Chief, Steve Williams, told reporters the next day that based on their investigation they found that this was an intentional act. He added, “We believe the victims were targeted because of their Islamic faith."

== Face cover ban controversy ==
During the 2015 Canadian federal election, Tom Mulcair's New Democratic Party (NDP) stance on a niqab issue contributed to a decline in the party's support in Quebec.

In 2015, Polling found widespread support for banning face covering during citizenship ceremony. A survey by Léger Marketing found 82% of Canadians favoured the policy somewhat or strongly, with just 15% opposed. Support was widespread, but especially strong in Quebec, where 93% were in favour of the requirement.

In 2017 the mayor of Quebec City, Régis Labeaume, said he supported legislation banning the wearing of the niqab or burqa in public spaces. A 2017 Canadian poll found that 54% supported banning the burka.

=== Bill 94 (Quebec) ===
In 2010, the Liberal government of Jean Charest introduced Bill 94, which would have required people to uncover their faces to identify themselves before receiving any government services. According to a 2010 Angus Reid Public Opinion poll, the bill was supported by 95% of Quebecers at the time. The legislation ultimately failed to pass when the Liberals were defeated in the 2012 election.

=== Quebec Charter of Values (Quebec) ===
In 2013, the Parti Québécois government of Pauline Marois introduced a much stricter bill known as the Quebec Charter of Values, which would have banned public servants from wearing any "conspicuous" religious symbols including turbans, kippahs, and hijabs. The Charter was widely denounced for targeting Muslim women, and it failed to become law before another election.

=== Bill 62 (Quebec) ===
On October 18, 2017, the National Assembly of Quebec successfully passed legislation titled "Bill 62 (fr)." The law will take effect on July 1, 2018. According to the Associated Press, the law "bans the wearing of face coverings for people giving or receiving a service from the state" and "offers a framework outlining how authorities should grant accommodation requests based on religious beliefs." In effect, this prohibits Muslim women who wear face veils from receiving or giving public services, including riding public transportation. The law also prohibits public workers like doctors and teachers from covering their faces at work. The bill passed 65-51 with every MP in favour of the law being a member of the Quebec Liberal Party. Quebec's two main opposition parties, the Parti Québécois and Coalition Avenir Québec, opposed the bill, arguing it didn't go far enough in restricting the presence of conspicuous symbols of all religions in the public sphere. Stéphanie Vallée, Quebec's minister of justice, sponsored the bill and said it would foster social cohesion. Quebec Premier Philippe Couillard supported the law, saying "We are in a free and democratic society. You speak to me, I should see your face, and you should see mine. It's as simple as that."

Proponents of the law argue it ensures state neutrality, but critics of the law argue it is unfairly directed at Muslim women who wear niqabs or burqas. Face coverings in Canada are rare, with about 3% of Muslim women wearing some type of face veil nationwide. Shaheen Ashraf, a board member of Canadian Council of Muslim Women said Muslim women "are feeling targeted" by the law. She added, "The message they're sending to those women is that you stay home and don't come out of your house because they are choosing to cover their faces and they cannot board a bus or use any public transportation or receive any services." Ihsaan Gardee, the executive director of the National Council of Canadian Muslims said the legislation is "an unjustified infringement of religious freedoms." The NCCM also claimed the legislation violates the Canadian Charter of Rights and Freedoms and is planning on challenging it in court. Fo Niemi of the Center for Research-Action on Race Relations said the law could be challenged at the United Nations as "a violation of certain rights protected by the Convention on the Elimination of All Forms of Discrimination against Women." Jagmeet Singh, leader of the New Democratic Party, stated he was "completely opposed" to the new law. Montreal Mayor Denis Coderre accused the provincial government of overstepping its jurisdiction and Montreal-based civil rights lawyer Julius Grey called Bill 62 a "terrible law." When asked by reporters, Prime Minister Justin Trudeau said, "I don’t think it’s the government’s business to tell a woman what she should or shouldn’t be wearing."

With regards to public opinion, an October 27 Ipsos poll found that 76% of Quebecers backed Bill 62, with 24% opposing it. The same survey found the 68% of Canadians in general supported a law similar to Bill 62 in their part of Canada. An October 27 Angus Reid Institute poll found that 70% Canadians outside of Quebec supported "legislation similar to Bill 62" where they lived in the country, with 30% opposing it.

However, a judge ruled that the face-covering ban cannot enter into force pending judicial review, due to irreparable harm it will cause Muslim women. For the second time since December 2017 a Quebec judge suspended that section of the law, challenged in court by the National Council of Canadian Muslims and by the Canadian Civil Liberties Association. In the courts' judgement, that law violates the freedoms guaranteed by the Quebec and Canadian charters of human rights and freedoms.

=== Bill 21 (Quebec) ===
Bill 21 is a statute passed by the National Assembly of Quebec in 2019, which asserts that Quebec is a lay state (secular state). It prohibits the wearing of religious symbols by certain public employees in positions of authority.

In 2026, The National Assembly in Quebec passed Bill 9 that expands on its secularism law Bill 21. It bans wearing religious symbols for daycare workers and prayer spaces in public institutions.

== Discrimination in healthcare ==
In December 2021, a Montreal doctor submitted a letter condemning the wearing of hijabs as an "instrument of oppression", which later appeared in the Canadian Medical Association Journal. The letter was retracted, and an official apology was issued by the editor-in-chief of the Canadian Medical Association Journal.

A joint study from McMaster University and the Muslim Advisory Council of Canada described "obvious gaps" in research regarding islamophobia in Canadian health-care settings. American research gathered from the study indicated that over half of Muslim patients stated that they were "dismissed, excluded, or ignored in health-care settings," often reporting lower quality care or lack of cultural consideration. Tabassum Wyne of the Muslim Advisory Council of Canada commented on how Muslim women and girls were more vulnerable to discrimination in health-care settings, stating that there would be "long-term threatening effects if large-scale solutions are not put in place."

== Public perceptions ==
Especially since 9/11, there has been an upsurge in attention paid to religious diversity by researchers, and therefore this is a developing field of research.

=== Of Muslims ===
A 2007 poll conducted in 23 Western countries showed Canadians had the most tolerant attitude toward Muslims. Only 6.5 percent of Canadians said they would not like to live next door to a Muslim, compared to 11 percent of Americans.

A 2016 FORUM poll found that 28% of Canadians disliked Muslims, compared to 16% who disliked First Nations (the next most disliked group). Muslims were primarily disliked in Quebec, where Jews were also disliked. Muslims were also disliked by Conservatives, who happened to have higher levels of religious bias than Liberals or New Democrats. A 2015 Angus Reid poll found that 44% of Canadians disliked Muslims, compared to 35% who disliked Sikhs (the next most disliked religion). Dislike of Muslims was particularly higher in Quebec, where Jews and Sikhs were also disliked.

Anti-Muslim sentiment in Canada is reportedly increasing. Angus Reid found an increase between 2009 and 2013. Canadian Race Relations Foundation documented a worsening of public opinion between 2012 and 2016. The Association for Canadian Studies points out that as public opinion of Muslims has gotten worse, opinions regarding groups like Asians have improved. It is hypothesized that this could be "a displacement of negative sentiment" being transferred onto the Muslim population.

In July 2016, a survey by the polling firm MARU/VCR&C reported that only a third of Ontarians had a positive impression of Islam, and more than half believed that mainstream Islamic teachings promote violence. Three-quarters said that Muslim immigrants have fundamentally different values. This survey was conducted following the arrival of nearly 12,000 Syrian refugees to Ontario in the first half of 2016. The survey also found that opposition to the arrival of Syrian refugees was higher among those who had negative views of Islam.

==== Quebec ====
Statistics suggest that Islamophobia is particularly prevalent in Quebec. An Angus Reid poll in 2009 found that 68% of Quebecers surveyed held an unfavourable view of Islam. This had risen just slightly in 2013 to 69%. However, the same poll showed that the increase of Islamophobic attitudes in the rest of Canada was greater than it was in Quebec, rising from 46% in 2009 to 54% in 2013.

A 2015 survey conducted in Quebec found that 49% of respondents would be bothered if they received services from someone wearing the headscarf; compared to 31% who were bothered by the Sikh turban, 25% who were bothered by the kippa, and 6% who were bothered by the cross.

=== Of discrimination against Muslims ===
The 2003 Ethnic Diversity Survey conducted by Statistics Canada found that only 0.54% of Muslims reported being a victim of a hate crime based on religion between 1998 and 2003. A 2016 survey found that 35% of Muslims in Canada reported experiencing discrimination.

In 2006, an Environics poll reported that 34% Canadians believed that Muslims "often" experience discrimination in Canada; that number increased to 44% in 2010. In both years, Muslims and Aboriginal Peoples were seen as the two groups most likely to experience discrimination. A 2011 Ipsos Reid poll reported that 60% of Canadians felt that discrimination against Muslims increased after the 9/11 attacks.

In 2011, Ipsos Reid asked Canadians whether Muslims in Canada should receive the same treatment as any other Canadian. 81% of respondents said Muslims should receive the same treatment, 15% said Muslims ought to be treated differently. The percentage of respondents who believed in treating Muslims differently was highest in Alberta (31%), followed by Quebec (21%).

== Role of the media ==
The Canadian media have been criticized for their role in perpetrating Islamophobia, both generally and in their news coverage of specific events. Canadian professor of journalism Karim H. Karim asserts that in the post-9/11 era an "Islamic peril" has replaced the "Soviet threat" of the Cold War years in Canada. After comparing Canadian mainstream media coverage of religious minority communities in Canada, Mahmoud Eid concludes that the Canadian media commonly apply the frames of dehumanization, extremism, fanaticism, inequality and Islamophobia to Muslims. The stereotypes of Muslims, Arabs and Middle Easterners are: terrorists, savage, a fifth column. These stereotypes are then said to fuel suspicion of Muslims in general, which then results in hate crimes against them. In fact, a study found a similarity between media myths on Muslims and the hate-text of many documented anti-Muslim incidents.

Nevertheless, Barbara Perry argues that Canadian media is more balanced and objective in its coverage of Muslims than that of the UK, US and Australia. She cited the case of the 2006 "Toronto 18" terrorist plot, where outlets like Toronto Star recognized that the suspects were on the fringe of the Muslim community and gave coverage to Muslim leaders, allowing them to present a more peaceful side of Islam.

Denise Helly of Institut national de la recherche scientifique writes that the media often falsely gives an impression that "Muslims are incessantly demanding recognition of special practices," by giving widespread coverage to trivial incidents. She cites examples such as the debate on the skirt length of a female employee at Pearson airport, or the wearing of a headscarf on a soccer team in Edmonton.

Toronto Star's publisher, John Cruickshank, claimed that "a big segment of the Canadian media has been peddling ‘flat-out racism and bigotry’ against Canadian Muslims."

The now-defunct Canadian Islamic Congress (CIC) started to monitor Canadian media coverage for Islamophobic sentiment in 1998. The CIC opposed the use of expressions such as "Muslim militants" and "Islamic insurgency" by arguing that no religion endorses terrorism or militancy.

The Canadian Broadcasting Corporation's internationally acclaimed television sitcom Little Mosque on the Prairie, which aired from 2007 to 2012, has been described as having "opened up a public space for Muslim Canadians to express their traditions, rituals, culture, and religion on primetime Canadian television." However, others have argued that the underlying assumptions of the show continue to re-affirm, rather than challenge, certain Canadian hegemonic values and expectations about Muslims.

=== Specific outlets ===
In the past, certain media outlets have been criticized for their perceived bias in coverage of Muslims. Likewise, certain media outlets have been praised for covering Islam and Muslims in a balanced way.

In 1998, the Canadian Islamic Congress (CIC) singled out the newspaper National Post as a leading consistently Islamophobic media outlet in Canada. A 2006 study at the University of Alberta reported that during the 2006 federal election, 42% of National Post's election-time articles associated Islam and Muslims with terrorism, compared to 9% of stories in The Globe and Mail and 14% of stories in the Toronto Star.

In 2016, Toronto Star's former columnist Haroon Siddiqui accused the National Post and the Postmedia group of newspapers of perpetuating Islamophobia.

In 2007, the CIC filed complaints with the Canadian Human Rights Commission, Ontario Human Rights Commission (OHRC) and British Columbia Human Rights Tribunal (BCHRT) against Maclean's Magazine, accusing the magazine of publishing 18 Islamophobic articles between 2005 and 2007, including a derogatory article titled "The Future of Islam" by Mark Steyn. The Canadian Human Rights Commission dismissed the CIC’s complaint. BCHRT found that while the article contained "factual inaccuracies" and may use exaggeration to cause the reader to fear Muslims, it did not violate anti-hate laws. BCHRT argued that "fear is not synonymous with hatred and contempt." OHRC described Maclean's articles as xenophobic, Islamophobic and promoting prejudice; however, the Commission maintained that it did not have the jurisdiction to actually hear the complaint. (For further details, see: Human rights complaints against Maclean's magazine)

The CIC has praised the Toronto Star and La Press for their sympathetic and relatively sophisticated treatment of Islam. A 2005 survey of 120 Canadian Muslims showed that 66% of respondents trusted the Toronto Star as their source for information, compared to 12% who trusted The Globe and Mail and 4% who trusted the National Post.

== Role of education ==
=== Public schools ===
The role of public education in promoting or denouncing Islamophobia has been studied. There have been many reported incidents at public schools in Canada that have been described as Islamophobic. The interactions of non-Muslim students, teachers and administrators have been described by one antiracist and gender-equity practitioner at a Canadian school board as based on stereotypes that are "reminiscent of the long-gone colonial era." Research also suggests that teachers’ low expectations racial and ethnic minoritized youth can lead to negative evaluation and biased assessments, and this is compounded by Islamophobic attitudes. One student, for example, believes that in high school she was often treated according to the misconception that education is not valued for Muslim women, and therefore her educational aspirations were not taken very seriously by the school's guidance counsellors. Hijab-wearing Muslim girls in elementary school have also reported being asked questions such as "Do you have some kind of head injury?" or "Are you bald?" by teachers.

In August 2016, the National Council of Canadian Muslims (NCCM) in partnership with other Muslim organizations as well as the Canadian Human Rights Commission published a guidebook for educators on how they can fight Islamophobia and its effect on Muslim children in Canadian classrooms. The creation of the guide was inspired in part by the case of an Ontario high school teacher who was fired in 2015 after it was discovered that he had tweeted racist and Islamophobic messages on Twitter. In December 2016, the York Region District School Board (YRDSB) in Ontario elected a new chair shortly after the NCCM (in conjunction with other community groups) filed a human rights complaint following a series of Facebook posts were published by the principal of a public school.

In January 2021, to mark the 4th anniversary of the Quebec Mosque Shooting, Inspirit Foundation and Noor Culture Centre launched a video series called 'Islamophobia-is'. They also included with it a guide for teachers of students in 6th to 12th grade.

In 2023, a Muslim student was singled out for allegedly missing pride activities and was told "you don't belong here" by his teacher.

In April 2023, Bernard Drainville Quebec Minister of Education announced plans to ban prayer in all provincial public schools.

During the 2026 Quebec general election Parti Québécois (PQ) Leader Paul St-Pierre Plamondon proposed extending state secularism rules to bar elementary school students from wearing conspicuous religious symbols in the classroom.

=== Universities ===
Islamophobic attitudes and incidents have also been reported on Canadian university campuses. In August 2015, a report was published in Convergence, an undergraduate community research journal, in which Muslim students at McGill and Concordia were surveyed. The surveys revealed that 36.6% of respondents said that they may have been discriminated against at their place of education because of their religion, while 12.2% were certain that they had experienced this. In 2013, a McGill professor was found guilty by the McGill Committee on Student Grievances of having issued death threats and of engaging in "religious, cultural and personal offences" toward a Muslim graduate student. In December 2016, the University of Toronto's St. Michael's College Student Union's vice-president resigned from his position after a video displaying what was deemed to be Islamophobic conduct at an SMCSU event, which he had posted to social media, was widely shared.

== Role of politicians ==
In 2005, amidst global protests, then Ontario Premier Dalton McGuinty rejected the use of Sharia Law in Ontario, for muslim divorces. However, Catholic and Jewish faith-based tribunals are permitted to settle family law matters on a voluntary basis since 1991

In 2015, then Prime Minister Stephen Harper, while answering questions about terrorism suspects, said "it doesn't matter what the age of the person is, or whether they're in a basement, or whether they're in a mosque or somewhere else." The remarks were seen as casting mosques as "venues of terrorism", by the NCCM, who expressed concerns about increased attacks on mosques as a result of this perception. The leader of the Opposition said the remarks were Islamophobic, and noted that mosques actually work closely with security agencies in preventing radicalization. In response, Harper released a statement recognizing the Muslim community's efforts in fighting terror.

"To be clear, there is no place for Islamophobia in Canada," said Canadian Prime Minister Justin Trudeau during a virtual meeting with representatives of the community and male-dominated organizations in the country.

According to "Minister of Diversity and Inclusion and Youth (Canada)": I stand united with Muslim Canadians—and all Canadians—in condemning the hatred that fuels Islamophobia. Let us remain vigilant and stand strong in the face of fear and intolerance to build a society where all Canadians can live and worship peacefully and safely.

In January 2023, Amira Elghawaby was appointed as Canada's first Special Representative on Combatting Islamophobia, with a mandate to advise the federal government and support efforts to address anti-Muslim hate.

=== Quebec ===
In 2007, the Quebec town of Hérouxville adopted an "immigrant code of conduct", even though the town had no immigrants. The code warned the town's non-existent immigrant population against stoning women and told them about the importance of Christmas trees. The code was widely considered Islamophobic and xenophobic, and caught the attention of media around the world. The author of the code, André Drouin, later called for all mosques in Canada to be temporarily shut down.

In 2013, the Parti Québécois (PQ) proposed a "Charter of Quebec values" to ban certain religious symbols in the workplace. The announcement was followed by a string of attacks against Muslims, particularly Muslim women who wear the hijab. Many blamed the attacks on the divisive rhetoric surrounding the debate, and accused the PQ of exploiting the debate for political gain.

In August 2016, Nathalie Roy MNA came out as against Burkini and Hijab, saying these are accessories of Radical Islam.

== Implications on Muslim Canadians ==
The implications of bill 62 not only affected Quebec residents as a whole, but also additionally created a contradictory visualization of Canada. The nation often is considered to be a "multicultural mosaic", however, the implementation of bill 62 left Canadians questioning this term. One Canadian Citizen added, "Just as every woman has the right to reveal herself, the woman next to her has the right to conceal herself… If the government is going to impact our basic rights, I don't want to be a part of it."

The bill contains many implications for Muslim women, as it affects all aspects of private services, such as, schooling, transportation and medical. Canadian Muslim women who are looking to further their education have publicly stated that bill 62, is not only an oppressive law on their education, but also a driving force behind considering other schools. Ultimately, the future of Canada as a whole appears rather murky as it is estimated that 68% of Canadians are in favor of this ban in their own province, thus leaving Muslim women feeling as though they are being restricted from obtaining a higher education.

== Responses ==
Many Canadians have demonstrated against Islamophobia, often in the aftermath of Islamophobic incidents.

On November 21, 2015, hundreds of Torontonians protested after a string of Islamophobic incidents.

In 2016, the Islamophobia hotline was launched by the British Columbia Civil Liberties Association and 8 other groups to provide free legal assistance to victims of Islamophobia.

=== Government ===
==== Federal ====
On October 26, 2016, the Parliament of Canada passed a motion to condemn "all forms of Islamophobia". When the motion was first proposed, on October 6, it was opposed by some Conservative MPs. Many Canadian Muslims expressed disappointment at Conservative opposition. However, on October 26, when the motion was re-introduced, it passed unanimously with all parties in favor.

Liberal MP Iqra Khalid proposed Motion 103 in December 2016, a non-binding motion to "condemn Islamophobia and all forms of systemic racism and religious discrimination". It was supported by MPs from the Liberals, NDP, and the Green Party but opposed by many of the Opposition Conservative MPs. The motion passed by a vote of 201–91 on March 23, 2017.

As of November 11, 2017, the courts challenged Bill-62 on the grounds that it endorses violating the rights of women. The discrepancy between the Canadian Government, Quebec legislation, and citizens revolves around the specifics that state regulatory laws within the Charter of Rights and Freedoms. The Quebec Government has argued that the bill is not promoting racism, or targeting religions, but rather focused on protection of all citizens within the province. Contrarily, groups filed lawsuits against the bill stating that it is "unconstitutional and discriminates against an already marginalized population".

Prime Minister Justin Trudeau publicly stated that the Canadian Government is looking into the issue, and the potential corresponding actions that it could take moving forward. Trudeau stated that of the possibilities, the Federal Government could intervene, or it may align itself with advocacy or legal groups that are already involved.

Addressing the core issue of the Charter of Rights and Freedoms Trudeau stated that "I think I’ve been very clear that I don’t think a government should be legislating what a woman should or shouldn’t be wearing. I don’t think that’s something that is right for Canada, I will always defend the Charter of Rights and Freedoms and as for next steps, we’re watching the situation as it unfolds and reflecting on what those steps might or could be". Prime Minister Trudeau's comments displayed optimism for Canadian women, as there are currently 12 countries globally besides Canada that have implemented a partial or full face ban.

On January 28, 2021, the Government of Canada announced its intention to make January 29 a National Day of Remembrance of the Quebec City Mosque Attack and Action Against Islamophobia.

==== Provincial ====
On October 1, 2015, the National Assembly of Quebec unanimously adopted a motion that condemned Islamophobia and incitement of hatred and violence toward Muslim Quebecers, in particular Syrian refugees.

On February 23, 2017, the Legislative Assembly of Ontario unanimously passed a motion condemning all forms of Islamophobia, along with "all forms of hatred, hostility, prejudice, racism and intolerance." The motion was supported by all parties.

On May 16, 2017 Justice Minister Stephanie Vallee supported the bill as she stated, "It’s a bill about the way public services are rendered between two individuals". This comment came at the ire of Canadian citizens, as they felt it was a not-so subtle attempt made by the Quebec government, the "Act to foster adherence to State religious neutrality".

==== Municipal ====
In July 2016, six Canadian cities signed the "Charter for Inclusive Communities", a statement against Islamophobia. The cities were: Toronto, Montreal, Vancouver, Calgary, Windsor and London.

=== Critical ===
Islamophobia has been described by the Council for Muslims Facing Tomorrow (MFT), a self-proclaimed reformist Muslim organization based in Canada, as "a contrived phrase" used by certain Muslims to pander to a self-victimizing ideology and to stifle debate and conversation.

Canadian author and advocate for Islamic reform, Irshad Manji, has said that the defensiveness displayed by Muslims that causes a critic of Islam or Muslims to quickly be labeled an Islamophobe or accused of collusion with Islamophobes sends a message to actual Islamophobes that Muslims have something to hide and that they are reactionary in nature, implying that such questionable accusations of Islamophobia actually end up perpetuating Islamophobia.

== See also ==
- Antisemitism in Canada
- Islamophobia
- Islam in Canada
- Islamophobia in Australia
- Islamophobia in the United States
