= National Council of Canadian Muslims =

Islamic organization based in Canada and the United States

The National Council of Canadian Muslims (NCCM) is a non-profit Canadian Muslim civil liberties and human rights advocacy organization. The organization was established in 2000 to focus on combatting Islamophobia, hate and racism through legal action, public advocacy, education, and media representation. NCCM's mission is "to protect human rights & civil liberties and dismantle Islamophobia through advocacy."

== Legal cases ==
NCCM takes on cases of hate and discrimination such as Islamophobic assaults, vandalism, harassment, employment discrimination, and racial profiling. NCCM also takes on major cases to challenge discriminatory laws and policies such as Quebec's Bill 21, the No Fly List, the Safe Third Country Act, and Bill 62. NCCM frequently collaborates with partners such as the Canadian Civil Liberties Association to combat encroachments on civil liberties. NCCM lawyers have appeared in multiple courts including human rights tribunals and the Supreme Court of Canada.

== Public advocacy ==
NCCM engages in lobbying all levels of government to strengthen or enact laws and policies that address Islamophobia in all its forms. After the London Terror Attack in Ontario in 2021 when 4 members of a Muslim family perished in an Islamophobic attack, NCCM submitted 61 recommendations directed at municipal, provincial and federal governments to tackle Islamophobia in their jurisdictions. NCCM has been named as a top lobbying organization in Canada by The Hill Times on multiple occasions.

NCCM has been active on several public policy files including systemic Islamophobia in national security agencies, the CRA, policing, and education. NCCM also advocates on Canadian foreign policy in relation to Islamophobia, including on Canadian positions on multiple issues related to Palestine, Afghanistan, the treatment of Uyghurs in China and the treatment of Muslims and other minorities in India.

== Education ==
NCCM engages in anti-Islamophobia educational work with public schools, educators, corporations, unions and others. In addition, NCCM provides advocacy services to students who face Islamophobic discrimination or hate at school.

NCCM has been involved in advocating for anti-Islamophobia strategies at multiple school boards, with the first being passed in the Peel District School Board in Ontario as well as a province-wide strategy in British Columbia.

== Media representation ==
NCCM frequently comments in the media on issues related to Islamophobia and racism, and the organization publishes op-eds in Canadian newspapers on various policy issues.

== Legal case ==
NCCM was formerly known as the Canadian Council on American-Islamic Relations (CAIR-CAN) prior to 2013 and was independent of the U.S. organization of a similar name, CAIR. In 2014, the NCCM sued former Canadian Prime Minister Stephen Harper and his spokesman Jason MacDonald for defamation for alleging that the organization had connections with a terrorist organization because of similar accusations directed at CAIR; however, these accusations were settled in court when Harper's spokesperson admitted that his statements regarding NCCM were wrong. The Government of Canada also issued a statement disavowing MacDonald's inaccurate statement about NCCM.

In 2015, NCCM was ordered by a Canadian court to produce documents relating to its predecessor CAIR-CAN and Wael Haddara, who had served on its board and was a founding director of the International Relief Fund for the Afflicted and Needy-Canada (IRFAN-Canada). IRFAN-Canada had its charitable status revoked by the Canada Revenue Agency in 2011, following findings that it had transferred approximately $14.6 million to organisations associated with Hamas between 2005 and 2009. The matter subsequently became relevant to court proceedings in which NCCM was required to produce documents relating to IRFAN-Canada. NCCM denied allegations of direct ties to Hamas and pursued a defamation lawsuit against the government. The parties reached a settlement in 2017.

== See also ==
- Islamophobia
- Islamophobia in Canada
- Canadian Civil Liberties Association
- Bridge Initiative
- Council on American-Islamic Relations
