= Kitchener Centre (federal electoral district) =

Federal electoral district in Ontario, Canada

Coordinates: 43.4562°N 80.4794°W

Ontario electoral district
- Interactive map of riding boundaries from the 2025 federal election

Federal electoral district
- Legislature: House of Commons
MP
Kelly DeRidder
Conservative
- District created: 1996
- First contested: 1997
- Last contested: 2025
- District webpage: profile, map

Demographics
- Population (2016): 105,258
- Electors (2019): 83,884
- Area (km²): 41.47
- Pop. density (per km²): 2,538.2
- Census division: Waterloo
- Census subdivision: Kitchener (part)

Kitchener Centre (French: Kitchener-Centre) is a federal electoral district in Ontario, Canada, that has been represented in the House of Commons of Canada since 1997.

== Geography ==
The district includes the north-central and north-eastern parts of the city of Kitchener, Ontario, including the downtown core.

== Political geography ==
In 2008, the race in Kitchener was razor thin between the Conservatives and Liberals. Politically, the riding is split by the Conestoga Parkway—the area to the west of the Parkway tends to support the Liberals while the area to the east of it tends to vote for the Conservatives. The New Democrats also won a small handful of polls, scattered around the riding. In 2019, The Greens saw one of their largest increases as their share of the vote jumped up 23 points, from 3% to 26%, and took second place from the Conservatives. In terms of vote share and margin of loss, this was the Greens' most successful result in Ontario (even better than neighbouring Guelph, which has a Green MPP) and part of their surge in the south west of the province. In 2021, despite a nationwide vote collapse for the Greens, returning candidate Mike Morrice was able to pull off an upset win, largely helped by the collapse in support for the incumbent Liberal MP, Raj Saini, being involved in sexual assault allegations. This makes Morrice the first ever Green MP from Ontario on the federal level.

== Demographics ==
According to the 2021 Canadian census

Ethnic groups: 71.5% White, 7.9% Black, 5.8% South Asian, 3.3% Indigenous, 2.5% Latin American, 2.1% Southeast Asian, 1.9% Arab, 1.3% Chinese, 1.0% West Asian
Languages: 70.1% English, 2.6% German, 2.0% Spanish, 1.9% Arabic, 1.7% German, 1.6% Tigrigna, 1.5% Serbian, 1.2% Portuguese, 1.1% Romanian, 1.0% French
Religions: 53.4% Christian (22.2% Catholic, 4.3% Christian Orthodox, 3.6% Lutheran, 2.8% United Church, 2.5% Anglican, 1.4% Presbyterian, 1.4% Pentecostal, 1.4% Anabaptist, 1.2% Baptist, 12.6% other), 5.9% Muslim, 2.6% Hindu, 1.0% Sikh, 35.0% none
Median income: $40,800 (2020)
Average income: $50,440 (2020)

== History ==
The electoral district was created in 1996 from parts of Kitchener and Kitchener—Waterloo ridings.

It initially consisted of the part of the City of Kitchener bounded on the west by the western limit of the city, on the south by a line drawn from west to east along the Conestoga Parkway, Strasburg Road, Block Line Road, the Canadian Pacific Railway line, and Highway No. 8, on the east by the Grand River, and on the north by a line drawn from east to west along Victoria Street, Lawrence Avenue and Highland Road West.

In 2003, it was redefined to consist of the part of the City of Kitchener bounded on the west by the western limit of the city, on the north by a line drawn from west to east along Highland Road West, Fischer Hallman Road and the Canadian National Railway situated northerly of Shadeland Crescent, on the east by the Grand River, and on the south by a line drawn from east to west along the King Street Bypass (Highway No. 8), King Street East and the Conestoga Parkway.

This riding lost territory to Kitchener—Conestoga and Kitchener South—Hespeler, and gained territory from Kitchener—Waterloo during the 2012 electoral redistribution.

== Members of Parliament ==
This riding has elected the following members of Parliament:

Parliament	Years	Member	Party
Kitchener Centre; Riding created from Kitchener and Kitchener—Waterloo
36th	1997–2000	Karen Redman	Liberal
37th	2000–2004	Karen Redman	Liberal
38th	2004–2006	Karen Redman	Liberal
39th	2006–2008	Karen Redman	Liberal
40th	2008–2011	Stephen Woodworth	Conservative
41st	2011–2015	Stephen Woodworth	Conservative
42nd	2015–2019	Raj Saini	Liberal
43rd	2019–2021	Raj Saini	Liberal
44th	2021–2025	Mike Morrice	Green
45th	2025–present	Kelly DeRidder	Conservative

== Election results ==
2025 Canadian federal election
** Preliminary results — Not yet official **
Party	Candidate	Votes	%	±%	Expenditures
Conservative	Kelly DeRidder	20,217	34.22	+9.38	
Green	Mike Morrice	19,859	33.62	+0.25	
Liberal	Brian Adeba	17,298	29.28	+11.92	
New Democratic	Heather Zaleski	1,157	1.96	–15.54	
People's	Wasai Rahimi	334	0.57	–6.08	
Animal Protection	Ellen Papenburg	111	0.19	–0.09	
United	Margaretha Dyck	98	0.17	N/A	
Total valid votes/expense limit					
Total rejected ballots					
Turnout		59,074	68.78		
Eligible voters		85,885			
Conservative notional gain from Green		Swing		+4.57	
Source: Elections Canada

2021 federal election redistributed results
Party	Vote	%
Green	17,190	33.37
Conservative	12,798	24.84
New Democratic	9,015	17.50
Liberal	8,943	17.36
PPC	3,425	6.65
Others	146	0.28

2021 Canadian federal election
Party	Candidate	Votes	%	±%	Expenditures
Green	Mike Morrice	17,872	34.9	+8.9	$110,414.01
Conservative	Mary Henein Thorn	12,537	24.5	+0.5	$71,022.32
New Democratic	Beisan Zubi	8,938	17.5	+6.2	$43,723.62
Liberal	Raj Saini (Note: Saini withdrew his candidacy, but after closure of nominations, so remained listed as the Liberal candidate on the ballot.)	8,297	16.2	-20.5	$70,160.14
People's	Diane Boskovic	3,381	6.6	+4.7	$2,346.29
Animal Protection	Ellen Papenburg	154	0.3	+0	$8,074.38
Total valid votes/expense limit		51,179	98.81	-0.36	$112,017.63
Total rejected ballots		525	1.02	+0.19	
Turnout		51,275	62.41	–	
Eligible voters		82,159	–	–	
Green gain from Liberal		Swing		+9.28	
Source: Elections Canada

2019 Canadian federal election
Party	Candidate	Votes	%	±%	Expenditures
Liberal	Raj Saini	20,316	36.69	-12.09	$71,251.01
Green	Mike Morrice	14,394	25.99	+22.94	$72,289.70
Conservative	Stephen Woodworth	13,191	23.82	-6.54	$86,969.26
New Democratic	Andrew Moraga	6,238	11.27	-5.34	$15,354.69
People's	Patrick Bernier	1,033	1.87	–	none listed
Animal Protection	Ellen Papenburg	202	0.36	–	none listed
Total valid votes/expense limit		55,374	99.17	-0.28	
Total rejected ballots		465	0.83	+0.28	
Turnout		55,839	66.57	-0.93	
Eligible voters		83,884	–	–	
Liberal hold		Swing		-17.52	
Source: Elections Canada

2015 Canadian federal election
Party	Candidate	Votes	%	±%	Expenditures
Liberal	Raj Saini	25,504	48.78	+16.49	$101,034.78
Conservative	Stephen Woodworth	15,872	30.36	-10.00	$127,440.14
New Democratic	Susan Cadell	8,680	16.60	-5.32	$56,988.49
Green	Nicholas Wendler	1,597	3.05	-1.52	$1,292.98
Libertarian	Slavko Miladinovic	515	0.99	–	$9.05
Marxist–Leninist	Julian Ichim	112	0.21	–	–
Total valid votes/expense limit		52,280	99.44		$209,737.44
Total rejected ballots		292	0.56	–	
Turnout		52,572	67.50		
Eligible voters		77,887			
Liberal gain from Conservative		Swing		+13.25	
Source: Elections Canada

2011 federal election redistributed results
Party	Vote	%
Conservative	18,967	40.36
Liberal	15,175	32.29
New Democratic	10,305	21.93
Green	2,152	4.58
Others	396	0.84

2011 Canadian federal election
Party	Candidate	Votes	%	±%	Expenditures
Conservative	Stephen Woodworth	21,119	42.40	+5.70	$84,217.49
Liberal	Karen Redman	15,592	31.30	-4.64	$79,800.33
New Democratic	Peter Thurley	10,742	21.57	+3.48	$38,822.94
Green	Byron Williston	1,972	3.96	-4.55	$4,298.33
Independent	Alan Rimmer	199	0.40		$1,916.45
Communist	Martin Suter	93	0.19	-0.10	$502.09
Marxist–Leninist	Mark Corbiere	92	0.18	–	none listed
Total valid votes/expense limit		49,809	99.58	$87,274.51	
Total rejected ballots		209	0.42	+0.01	
Turnout		50,018	63.15	+5.12	
Eligible voters		80,480	–	–	
Conservative hold		Swing		+5.17	

2008 Canadian federal election
Party	Candidate	Votes	%	±%	Expenditures
Conservative	Stephen Woodworth	16,480	36.69	+4.56	$75,291
Liberal	Karen Redman	16,141	35.94	-7.32	$74,745
New Democratic	Oz Cole-Arnal	8,152	18.08	-0.35	$26,622
Green	John Bithell	3,818	8.51	+2.89	$2,612
Independent	Amanda Lamka	215	0.47	–	
Communist	Martin Suter	127	0.28	-0.26	$373
Total valid votes/expense limit		44,933	100.00	$84,756	
Total rejected ballots		183	0.41	-0.05	
Turnout		45,091	57.03	-7.67	
Conservative gain from Liberal		Swing		+5.94	

2006 Canadian federal election
Party	Candidate	Votes	%	±%
Liberal	Karen Redman	21,715	43.26	-3.8
Conservative	Steven Cage	16,131	32.13	+4.6
New Democratic	Richard Walsh-Bowers	9,250	18.43	-0.9
Green	Tony Maas	2,822	5.62	+0.2
Communist	Martin Suter	274	0.54	
Total valid votes		50,192	100.00	
Total rejected ballots		232	0.46	
Turnout		50,426	64.70	

2004 Canadian federal election
Party	Candidate	Votes	%	±%
Liberal	Karen Redman	21,264	47.1	-5.7
Conservative	Thomas Ichim	12,412	27.5	-12.4 (Note: Conservative vote is compared to the total of the Canadian Alliance vote and Progressive Conservative vote in 2000 election.)
New Democratic	Richard Walsh-Bowers	8,717	19.3	+12.4
Green	Karol Vesely	2,450	5.4	
Independent	Mark Corbiere	277	0.6	
Total valid votes		45,120	100.0	

2000 Canadian federal election
Party	Candidate	Votes	%	±%
Liberal	Karen Redman	23,511	52.8	+4.8
Alliance	Eloise Jantzi	11,603	26.1	+6.2 (Note: Canadian Alliance vote is compared to the Reform vote in 1997 election.)
Progressive Conservative	Steven Daniel Gadbois	6,162	13.8	-8.9
New Democratic	Paul Royston	3,058	6.9	-2.5
Communist	Martin Suter	167	0.4	
Total valid votes		44,501	100.0	

1997 Canadian federal election
Party	Candidate	Votes	%
Liberal	Karen Redman	23,089	48.0
Progressive Conservative	John Reimer	10,960	22.8
Reform	Ronald Albert Wilson	9,550	19.9
New Democratic	Lucy Harrison	4,503	9.4
Total valid votes		48,102	100.0

== See also ==
- List of Canadian electoral districts
- Historical federal electoral districts of Canada
