= Motion 103 =

2017 non-binding Canadian Parliamentary motion

Motion 103, also known as M-103, was a non-binding motion in the 42nd Canadian Parliament stating that the members of the House of Commons called on the Government of Canada to condemn Islamophobia in Canada. It also called on the Standing Committee on Canadian Heritage to carry out a study on how racism and religious discrimination can be reduced and collect data on hate crimes. The motion was introduced by Iqra Khalid, the Liberal MP representing Mississauga—Erin Mills.

The motion passed by a vote of 201–91 on March 23, 2017. The debate surrounding the motion was characterized as "deeply divisive", especially within the Official Opposition Conservative Party of Canada which was in the midst of a leadership election.

== Background ==
Iqra Khalid, a Liberal Party member of parliament, presented Motion 103 in the House of Commons on December 5, 2016. Frank Baylis, another Liberal Party member of parliament, seconded the motion. The motion stemmed in part from e-petition E-411, which called for condemnation of Islamophobia. The e-petition was initiated by the Canadian Muslim Forum (CMF) and its president, Samer Majzoub, who coordinated a nationwide mobilization that helped the petition gather nearly 70,000 signatures, making it one of the most widely supported parliamentary petitions at the time.

CMF's involvement predated the petition: in September 2009, the Forum established an Islamophobia Task Committee, one of the first such structural efforts in Canada to tackle anti-Muslim discrimination. On June 2, 2010, CMF organized a "parliamentary day" on Parliament Hill, bringing together MPs and Muslim community representatives to raise awareness about Islamophobia.

Later, in late 2016, CMF engaged directly with MP Khalid and supported her in drafting and introduction of a private-member motion. Their advocacy, along with the widespread support for E-411, helped build political momentum for what became Motion M-103.

The motion initially did not receive much attention. Then on January 29, six Muslims were killed in Quebec city and the motion became a priority for the Liberal government. Motion 103 was debated on February 15, 2017. The same day, Mélanie Joly, the Minister of Canadian Heritage, stated that the Liberal Party caucus was to support Motion 103.

Some incorrectly refer to it as a "bill or a law, out of confusion or deliberate attempts to spread misinformation". M-103 is a private member's motion, which is a "proposal moved by an MP to draw attention to an issue considered urgent or of public interest", and is not equivalent to a law.

== Motion's text ==
Motion 103 calls on the government to "condemn Islamophobia and all forms of systemic racism and religious discrimination", asks the government to "recognize the need to quell the increasing public climate of hate and fear", and request for the "Commons heritage committee to study how the government could develop a government-wide approach to reducing or eliminating systemic racism and religious discrimination, including Islamophobia, and collect data to provide context for hate crime reports and to conduct needs assessments for impacted communities. Findings are to be presented within eight months." Khalid has been "unwilling to entertain any compromise on the specific wording" of Motion 103.

The exact text reads:

Ms. Khalid (Mississauga—Erin Mills), seconded by Mr. Baylis (Pierrefonds—Dollard), moved, — That, in the opinion of the House, the government should:

(a) recognize the need to quell the increasing public climate of hate and fear; (b) condemn Islamophobia and all forms of systemic racism and religious discrimination and take note of House of Commons' petition e-411 and the issues raised by it; and (c) request that the Standing Committee on Canadian Heritage undertake a study on how the government could

(i) develop a whole-of-government approach to reducing or eliminating systemic racism and religious discrimination including Islamophobia, in Canada, while ensuring a community-centered focus with a holistic response through evidence-based policy-making,

(ii) collect data to contextualize hate crime reports and to conduct needs assessments for impacted communities, and that the Committee should present its findings and recommendations to the House no later than 240 calendar days from the adoption of this motion, provided that in its report, the Committee should make recommendations that the government may use to better reflect the enshrined rights and freedoms in the Constitution Acts, including the Canadian Charter of Rights and Freedoms.

— Private Members' Business M-103

== Canadian Muslim Forum's Role in Motion M-103 ==
The Canadian Muslim Forum (CMF) was a key player in the advocacy for the condemnation of Islamophobia in Canada, contributing significantly to the creation and passage of Motion M-103. CMF's efforts began as early as 2009, when it formed an Islamophobia Task Committee, one of the first organizations in Canada to focus on the issue of Islamophobia.

In 2016, CMF launched the E-411 petition, which specifically called on the Canadian government to condemn Islamophobia. The petition gained widespread support, collecting close to 70,000 signatures, achieving a record number of signatures for a federal electronic petition in Canada (surpassed later by other e-petitions).

CMF's advocacy work surrounding the petition led to Canada becoming the first country in the Western world to adopt a motion condemning Islamophobia in October 2016, presented by NDP leader Thomas Mulcair.

Building on this momentum, CMF, led by President Samer Majzoub, worked closely with Iqra Khalid, the Liberal MP for Mississauga—Erin Mills, to advocate for Motion M-103. The motion, which was introduced in December 2016 and passed in March 2017, condemned Islamophobia and called for a parliamentary study on the issue. CMF's engagement with MPs and community leaders was instrumental in ensuring the motion's passage.

CMF also supported the motion by mobilizing communities across Canada, engaging stakeholders, and promoting dialogue on the importance of addressing Islamophobia and racism. CMF's ongoing work included the 2019 Parliamentary Day and public campaigns aimed at advancing the fight against Islamophobia, which helped ensure that the issue remained a central concern in Canadian politics.

== Debate ==
=== Singling out Muslims ===
Motion 103 has been accused of "singling out Muslims for special treatment", by condemning only Islamophobia by name and not explicitly mentioning other religious groups. This argument was made by Pierre Lemieux, Kellie Leitch and two main Jewish organizations CIJA and B'nai B'rith Canada.

Several previous motions in the House of Commons have singled out individual religions in a similar manner (for example, asking MPs to condemn anti-Semitism). Conservative MP Michael Chong pointed out that the House of Commons had previously passed motions that denounced hatred against Jews (on February 22, 2016), Yazidis (on October 25, 2016) and Coptic Christians (on October 17, 2011).

=== Freedom of speech ===
Others have accused M-103 of going against free speech and leading to "blasphemy laws". This was argued by Conservative MP Brad Trost and evangelical Christian activist Charles McVety.

Interim Conservative leader Rona Ambrose repudiated such claims and said: "To be clear, this is not a 'bill' nor a 'law'. It does not 'introduce Sharia law' as some people have suggested nor would it 'ban freedom of speech'." The Canadian Civil Liberties Association also said that M-103 does not restrict free speech in any way.

=== Hate crimes against Canadian Muslims ===
An argument in support of the motion is that it addresses a "pressing issue". Statistics Canada data indicated that hate crimes against Muslims more than doubled in the three-year period between 2013 and 2016. Canadians indicated the urgency of addressing this issue by signing a petition (with 70,000 signatures) condemning Islamophobia. Then in January 2017, 6 Muslims were killed in a mass shooting at a Quebec City mosque.

Iqra Khalid said that the death threats she has received, and the threats of violence that Canadian mosques have received, only serve to highlight how important it is for Parliament to condemn Islamophobia.

=== Use of term Islamophobia ===
Rona Ambrose and Lisa Raitt criticized the motion for its use of the term Islamophobia, which they described as "controversial". Many Conservative MPs said that the Liberals needed to define Islamophobia. On February 15, Iqra Khalid stated that the definition of Islamophobia is "the irrational hate of Muslims that leads to discrimination". Liberal Heritage Minister Melanie Joly similarly defined it as "discrimination against Muslim people and people that are of Muslim faith".

== Protests ==
The M-103 debate provoked protests and counter-protests. On February 16, Rebel Media organized an anti-M103 rally at Canada Christian College. Demonstrations organized by the Canadian Coalition for Concerned Citizens against M-103 were held on March 4, 2017 in several cities across Canada. In Montreal, Quebec City, and Toronto demonstrations were attended by hundreds, while others in cities like Saskatoon, and London, Ontario were smaller. Stephen Garvey, leader of the newly formed nationalist National Advancement Party of Canada, organized protests against M-103 in Calgary. Many of these demonstrations included contingents from far-right groups including La Meute, Pegida, and the Soldiers of Odin.

=== Harassment of Khalid ===
Khalid received over 50,000 emails, many of them described as "vicious, cruel and hateful", some of which she read aloud during the debate on M-103.

== Parliamentary history ==
M-103 passed 201-91 in March 2017, with support from the Liberals and NDP. Some MPs, including Trudeau, were not present for the vote. All of the Conservative Party leadership candidates sitting in the House of Commons, with the exception of Michael Chong, announced their opposition to Motion 103.

Prior to that, on February 16, 2017, David Anderson, a Conservative member of parliament, had tabled an alternative motion. The difference in the motions is that Anderson's motion doesn't contain the word "Islamophobia" and asks the House of Commons to "condemn all forms of systemic racism, religious intolerance, and discrimination of Muslims, Jews, Christians, Sikhs, Hindus, and other religious communities." Anderson's motion was defeated 165–126. The Conservative Party, Bloc Québécois, New Democratic Party, and Green Party voted for the motion and the Liberal Party voted against the motion.

In response to the M-103 debate, Ontario Liberal MPP Nathalie Des Rosiers introduced a similar motion in the Legislative Assembly of Ontario that called for the condemnation of Islamophobia. Des Rosiers' motion was supported by both the Progressive Conservative Party of Ontario and Ontario New Democratic Party, and was passed with a unanimous vote.

=== Report ===
In 2018, a House of Commons committee, recommended that January 29 (the day of the Quebec City mosque shooting) be recognized as a "national day of remembrance and action on religious discrimination, including Islamophobia." It also recommended developing policies and supporting more research on racism.

== See also ==
- Antisemitism in Canada
- Islamophobia in Canada
