= Perth—Middlesex (provincial electoral district) =

Former provincial electoral district in Ontario, Canada

Ontario electoral district

Defunct provincial electoral district
- Legislature: Legislative Assembly of Ontario
- District created: 1996
- District abolished: 2003
- First contested: 1999
- Last contested: 2003

Perth—Middlesex was an electoral district in Ontario, Canada, that was represented in the Legislative Assembly of Ontario from 1999 to 2007.

This riding was created in 1996 from parts of Lambton—Middlesex, London—Middlesex and Perth—Wellington—Waterloo ridings. It consisted of:

- the County of Perth (including the City of Stratford and the Town of St Mary's) and
- the northeast part of the County of Middlesex (consisting of the Townships of McGillivray, East Williams, Lobo, Biddulph and West Nissouri).

The electoral district was abolished in 2003 when it was redistributed between Elgin—Middlesex—London, Middlesex—Kent—Lambton and Perth Wellington ridings.

== Election results ==
2003 Ontario general election
Party	Candidate	Votes	%	±%
Liberal	John Wilkinson	17,017	42.71	+6.36
Progressive Conservative	Bert Johnson	15,680	39.36	–12.64
New Democratic	Jack Verhulst	4,703	11.80	+4.61
Green	John Cowling	1,201	3.01	–
Family Coalition	Pat Bannon	857	2.15	–1.08
Freedom	Robby Smink	384	0.96	–0.26
Total valid votes		39,842	99.36	
Total rejected, unmarked and declined ballots		255	0.64	–0.07
Turnout		40,097	59.70	–0.55
Eligible voters		67,168		
Liberal gain from Progressive Conservative		Swing		+9.50
Source: Elections Ontario

1999 Ontario general election
Party	Candidate	Votes	%
Progressive Conservative	Bert Johnson	22,065	52.00
Liberal	John Wilkinson	15,428	36.36
New Democratic	Walter Edmund Vernon	3,053	7.19
Family Coalition	Pat Bannon	1,369	3.23
Freedom	Robby Smink	521	1.23
Total valid votes		42,436	99.30
Total rejected, unmarked and declined ballots		300	0.70
Turnout		42,736	60.25
Eligible voters		70,936	
Progressive Conservative pickup new district.			
Source: Elections Ontario
