= William Angus Dickson =

Canadian politician

Ontario MPP
- In office 1934–1945
- Preceded by: New riding
- Succeeded by: J. Fred Edwards
- Constituency: Perth

Personal details
- Born: 9 February 1882 Elma Township, Ontario, Canada
- Died: 25 July 1967 (aged 85) Listowel, Ontario, Canada
- Party: Liberal
- Spouse: Martha Fisher
- Relations: Thomas Ballantyne, Jane Philpott, great-grandfather
- Children: 4
- Occupation: Farmer

William Angus Dickson (9 February 1882 – 25 July 1967) was a Canadian politician. He was a Liberal member of the Legislative Assembly of Ontario from 1934 to 1945 who represented the riding of Perth.

== Background ==
Dickson was a farmer in Elma Township. He is related to Thomas Ballantyne, and great-grandfather of Jane Philpott.

== Politics ==
Dickson was reeve of Elma Township. In 1934, he ran as the Liberal candidate in the riding of Perth County.
