= Shane Konings =

Canadian curler

- Curler
- Born: September 28, 1990 (age 36); Gowanstown, Ontario

Team
- Curling club: Unionville CC; Unionville, ON
- Skip: Fraser Reid
- Third: Shane Konings
- Second: Spencer Nuttall
- Lead: Matt Pretty
- Mixed doubles partner: Lauren Wasylkiw

Curling career
- Member Association: Ontario (2011–present)

Shane Konings (born September 28, 1990) is a Canadian curler, originally from Gowanstown, Ontario.

== Career ==
=== Mixed doubles ===
Konings won the 2020 Ontario Mixed Doubles Curling Championship with Lauren Wasylkiw, but did not compete at the 2020 Canadian Mixed Doubles Curling Championship, as it was cancelled due to the COVID-19 pandemic. As the 2021 Ontario provincial playdowns were cancelled due to the COVID-19 pandemic in Ontario, Wasylkiw and Konings were selected to represent Ontario at the 2021 Canadian Mixed Doubles Curling Championship in Calgary. At the championship, the pair finished with a 2–4 record, defeating Kim Tuck / Wayne Tuck Jr. and Bayly Scoffin / Wade Scoffin. They qualified for the 2024 Canadian Mixed Doubles Curling Championship, where the pair finished with a 4-3 record.

== Personal life ==
Koning resides in Stouffville, Ontario and works as a GIS data engineer for LightBox. He is engaged to his doubles partner, Lauren Wasylkiw.
