= 1959 Listowel arena collapse =

1959 structural collapse in Ontario, Canada

- Date: February 28, 1959
- Time: 9:27 a.m. EST
- Venue: Listowel Memorial Arena
- Location: Listowel, Ontario, Canada; 43.7308°N 80.9431°W
- Type: Structural failure
- Cause: Snow loading and structural deficiencies
- Deaths: 8
- Injuries: 13

The 1959 Listowel arena collapse was a structural disaster that occurred on February 28, 1959, in Listowel, Ontario, Canada. At approximately 9:27 a.m., the roof and exterior walls of the Listowel Memorial Arena collapsed while a group of young hockey players were participating in a peewee hockey practice. Seven boys and the town's recreation director, Kenneth McLeod, were killed, and 13 other boys were injured.

Subsequent investigations identified deficiencies in the arena's structural design and construction, including defects in the glued-laminated timber roof trusses. Heavy and unevenly distributed snow loads contributed to the failure.

== Background ==
=== Construction of the arena ===
In 1953, the town of Listowel began planning a new arena with artificial ice to replace its existing natural-ice rink. On September 14, 1953, local ratepayers approved borrowing $50,000 toward construction. The following day, the town council appointed committees responsible for the building and its financing.

The arena measured approximately 240 feet (73 m) in length and 110 feet (34 m) in width. It contained a regulation-sized ice hockey rink, seating for more than 1,000 spectators, and an adjoining auditorium section incorporating a hall, snack room and dressing rooms.

The roof was supported by curved glued-laminated timber trusses spanning the rink. Its exterior walls were constructed from concrete blocks. The project proceeded without the engagement of a consulting engineer or architect to provide comprehensive professional oversight.

=== Conditions preceding the collapse ===
During the winter of 1958–1959, substantial quantities of snow accumulated on the arena roof, particularly along its northern edge. Some snow was removed in early January, although the removal efforts largely concentrated on overhanging snow rather than the entire accumulated load.

Witnesses later reported hearing unusual noises from the roof and observing sagging roof joists. Concerns regarding the condition of the building had been communicated to arena officials before the collapse.

== Collapse ==
On Saturday, February 28, 1959, a peewee hockey practice began at approximately 9 a.m. At 9:27 a.m., the roof failed without immediate warning, bringing down much of the rink structure and its exterior walls.

Witness testimony indicated that the failure began near the centre of the roof. Some survivors recalled seeing part of a roof truss fall before the remainder of the structure collapsed. One adult witness estimated that the collapse occurred over approximately three to four seconds.

Most of the arena's rink section was destroyed. The western entrance and auditorium section, which had additional interior partitions, remained standing.

== Rescue operations ==
Rescue operations began shortly after the collapse. Responders initially moved debris by hand before cranes and other heavy equipment were brought to the scene to assist with the removal of wreckage.

Survivors Pete Leppard and Murray Helmka, who were among the players on the ice, later recalled their experiences during the collapse. Both had been approaching the players' bench for a line change when the structure failed. Leppard escaped the wreckage himself, while Helmka was temporarily trapped before being freed.

According to the Listowel Banner, all victims had been recovered from the structure by approximately 10:30 a.m.

== Victims ==
Eight people died in the collapse, including seven young hockey players and recreation director Kenneth McLeod.

The seven boys were:

- James Hastings
- Kenneth Hymers
- Richard Kaufman
- John "Jackie" Rheubottom
- Bryan Seehaver
- Barry Smith
- Keith Wight

The eighth victim was Kenneth McLeod, Listowel's recreation director.

Thirteen other boys sustained injuries.

== Investigation ==
=== Coroner's inquest ===
Following the disaster, Ontario authorities initiated an investigation into the structural failure. Agencies involved included the Ontario Provincial Police, the Ontario Fire Marshal, the Ontario Department of Labour and the University of Toronto. Technical assistance was also sought from the National Research Council of Canada and the Forest Products Laboratories of Canada.

A coroner's inquest was held in Listowel from March 17 to 20, 1959. More than 100 witnesses provided testimony concerning the construction, maintenance and collapse of the arena.

=== Structural deficiencies ===
Investigators found several deficiencies affecting the arena's structural integrity. The roof trusses differed from the original design drawings, while laboratory testing demonstrated significant variations in the strength of the adhesive bonds used in their glued-laminated timber components.

Some laboratory specimens separated before mechanical testing could begin, indicating that their adhesive bonds had failed to develop adequate strength. The investigation also found that the arena's masonry walls and supporting pilasters did not satisfy the minimum dimensions specified by the 1953 National Building Code of Canada.

=== Snow loading ===
The collapse followed a winter characterized by substantial snowfall and prolonged periods of cold weather. Investigators found that snow had accumulated unevenly on the arena roof, particularly along the northern edge.

Measurements taken following the collapse recorded snow loads ranging from approximately 55 to 80 pounds per square foot in some locations. These loads exceeded the approximate 40 pounds per square foot assumed in the investigators' assessment of the building's original design.

The uneven distribution of snow produced unbalanced forces on the roof trusses, aggravating deficiencies in the building's structural components.

=== Safety recommendations ===
A technical report published in May 1960 recommended more rigorous oversight of the design and construction of buildings intended for public assembly. Its authors emphasized the importance of professional engineering supervision, construction inspections and quality control of structural materials.

== Aftermath ==
The Listowel Memorial Arena, which opened in 1964 following the collapse of the original arena in 1959 and closed in 2017.

Listowel remained without an indoor arena for approximately five years following the collapse. Local hockey teams used outdoor facilities or travelled to neighbouring communities, including Palmerston, before a replacement Memorial Arena opened in 1964.

The replacement arena served the community for more than five decades. It closed in December 2017 following the opening of the Steve Kerr Memorial Complex.

== Commemoration ==
A stone memorial and plaque honouring those killed in the disaster were dedicated at the Listowel branch of the North Perth Public Library in 2000. Local minor hockey organizations also commemorated the victims through memorial insignia worn by players.

On February 28, 2025, the Municipality of North Perth officially opened Memorial Arena Park '59 on the site of the former arena. The park includes bronze skate sculptures, memorial trees, an open lawn and a winter ice space. The municipality reported that more than $850,000 had been raised toward the project.

== See also ==
- Listowel, Ontario
- Structural failure
- Progressive collapse
