= Randy Pettapiece =

Canadian politician

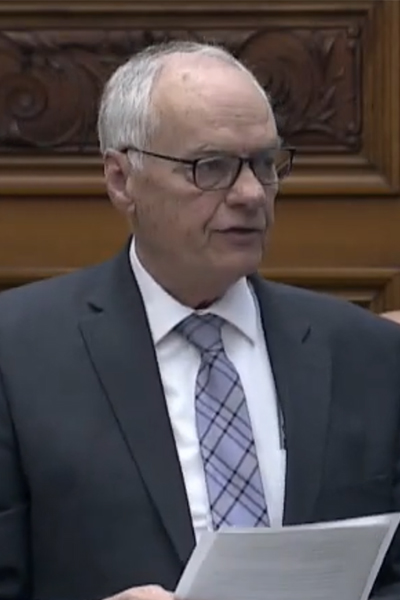
- Pettapiece speaking during the Members' Statements in 2022

Parliamentary Assistant to the Minister of Agriculture, Food and Rural Affairs (Rural Affairs)
- In office June 26, 2019 – May 3, 2022
- Minister: Ernie Hardeman

Member of the Ontario Provincial Parliament for Perth—Wellington
- In office October 6, 2011 – May 3, 2022
- Preceded by: John Wilkinson
- Succeeded by: Matthew Rae

Personal details
- Born: 1949 (age 76–77) Cottam, Ontario
- Party: Progressive Conservative
- Occupation: Businessman

Randy Pettapiece (born c. 1949) is a politician in Ontario, Canada. He was a Progressive Conservative member of the Legislative Assembly of Ontario who represented the riding of Perth—Wellington as MPP from 2011 until he stood down at the 2022 election.

== Background ==
Pettapiece was born and raised on a farm near Cottam, Ontario. He owns a decorating business.

== Politics ==
Pettapiece served two terms as a councillor for the township of North Perth, Ontario.

In the 2011 provincial election, he ran as the Progressive Conservative candidate in the riding of Perth—Wellington. He defeated Liberal incumbent John Wilkinson by 210 votes. He was re-elected in the 2014 election defeating Liberal candidate Stewart Skinner by 2,486 votes.

He is the party's critic for Community and Social Services and for Horse Racing.

== Electoral record ==
2018 Ontario general election: Perth—Wellington
Party	Candidate	Votes	%	±%
Progressive Conservative	Randy Pettapiece	23,736	50.67	+11.71
New Democratic	Michael O'Brien	14,385	30.71	+11.79
Liberal	Brendan Knight	5,062	10.81	–22.29
Green	Lisa Olsen	2,746	5.86	+0.98
Libertarian	Scott Marshall	380	0.81	–0.19
Consensus Ontario	Paul McKendrick	320	0.68	–
Freedom	Rob Smeenk	125	0.27	–0.23
Ontario Alliance	Andrew Stanton	89	0.19	–
Total valid votes		46,843	98.58	
Total rejected, unmarked and declined ballots		673	1.42	–0.14
Turnout		47,516	60.35	+4.69
Eligible voters		78,738		
Progressive Conservative hold		Swing		–0.04
Source: Elections Ontario

2014 Ontario general election
Party	Candidate	Votes	%	±%
Progressive Conservative	Randy Pettapiece	15,996	39.00	-1.09
Liberal	Stewart Skinner	13,510	32.94	-6.59
New Democratic	Romayne Smith Fullerton	7,768	18.94	+3.18
Green	Chris Desjardins	2,000	4.88	+2.40
Family Coalition	Irma DeVries	789	1.92	+0.23
Libertarian	Scott Marshall	411	1.00	
Independent	Matthew Murphy	343	0.84	
Freedom	Robby Smink	198	0.48	+0.04
Total valid votes		41,015	100.00	
Progressive Conservative hold		Swing		+2.75
Source: Elections Ontario

2011 Ontario general election
Party	Candidate	Votes	%	±%
Progressive Conservative	Randy Pettapiece	14,282	40.6	+8.6
Liberal	John Wilkinson	13,652	38.8	-6.8
New Democratic	Ellen Papenburg	5,596	15.9	+5.8
Green	Chris Desjardins	877	2.5	-5.3
Family Coalition	Irma DeVries	611	1.7	-0.3
Freedom	Robby Smink	158	0.4	0.0
Total valid votes		35,176	100.0	
