= John Smale =

John Smale may refer to:

- John G. Smale, American businessman
- Sir John Jackson Smale, British lawyer and judge
