= Voskamp =

Voskamp is a Dutch toponymic surname. Notable people with the surname include:

- Ann Voskamp (born 1973), Canadian author
- Bart Voskamp (born 1968), Dutch road bicycle racer
- Johan Voskamp (born 1984), Dutch footballer
- Leonoor Voskamp (born 1983), Dutch field hockey player
