= Bert Johnson (Canadian politician) =

Canadian politician

Ontario MPP
- In office 1999–2003
- Preceded by: New riding
- Succeeded by: John Wilkinson
- Constituency: Perth—Middlesex
- In office 1995–1999
- Preceded by: Karen Haslam
- Succeeded by: Riding abolished
- Constituency: Perth

Personal details
- Born: March 13, 1939 (age 87) Moorefield, Ontario
- Party: Progressive Conservative
- Occupation: Insurance agent, real estate salesman
- Portfolio: Deputy Speaker (1995-2003)

Bert Johnson (born March 13, 1939) is a former politician in Ontario, Canada. He was a Progressive Conservative member of the Legislative Assembly of Ontario from 1995 to 2003.

== Background ==
Johnson was educated at Stratford Teacher's College, and worked as an insurance and real-estate salesman before entering political life. He was a member of the Listowel, Ontario Planning Board from 1972 to 1976, and the Listowel Public Utilities Commission from 1978 to 1984. From 1984 to 1988, Johnson served as a member of the Perth County Board of Education, becoming its Vice-Chair in 1987. He then served as Mayor of Listowel from 1988 to 1994, and was a director of the Association of Municipalities of Ontario during his final year. Johnson has also served as a trustee of the Trinity United Church in Listowel.

== Politics ==
Johnson was elected to the Ontario legislature in the provincial election of 1995, defeating incumbent New Democrat Karen Haslam by over 5,000 votes in the riding of Perth. He served as a Deputy Speaker of the legislature for the entire parliament which followed, and was re-elected in the 1999 provincial election, defeating Liberal John Wilkinson by over 6,000 votes. He again served as a Deputy Speaker in the parliament which followed.

Johnson was defeated by Wilkinson in the 2003 provincial election, losing by about 1,500 votes.

In 2004, he endorsed Frank Klees for the leadership of the Ontario PC Party.
