= Matthew Rae =

Canadian politician (born 1990)

Matthew Rae MPP
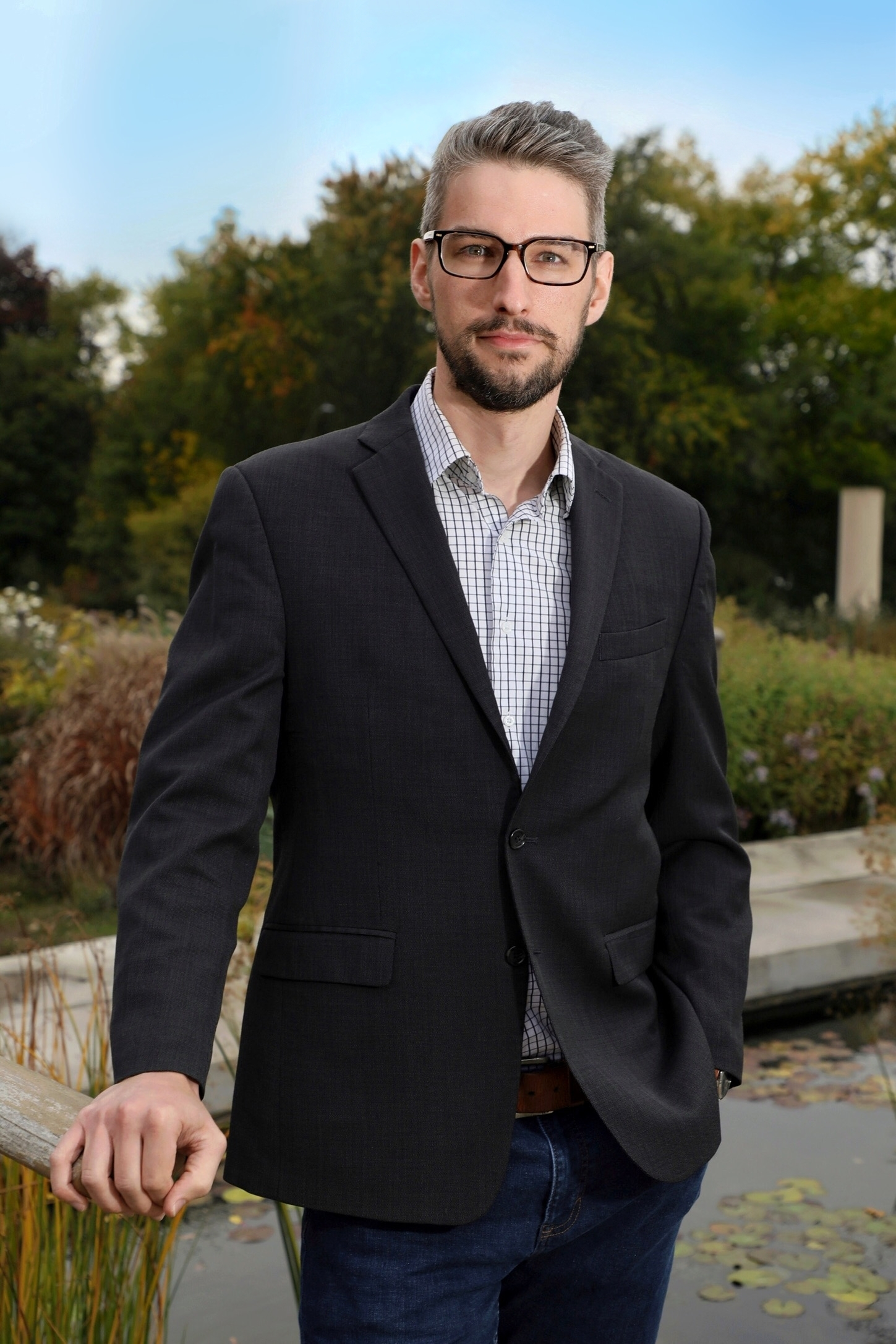
- Rae in 2022.

Ontario Associate Minister of Energy-Intensive Industries
- Incumbent
- Assumed office September 10, 2026
- Premier: Doug Ford
- Preceded by: Sam Oosterhoff

Parliamentary Assistant to the Minister of Municipal Affairs and Housing
- In office March 10, 2023 – September 10, 2026
- Minister: Rob Flack

Parliamentary Assistant to the Minister of Education
- In office June 29, 2022 – March 10, 2023
- Minister: Stephen Lecce

Member of the Ontario Provincial Parliament
- Incumbent
- Assumed office June 2, 2022
- Preceded by: Randy Pettapiece
- Constituency: Perth-Wellington

Personal details
- Born: May 18, 1990 (age 36) Palmerston, Ontario, Canada
- Party: Progressive Conservative
- Education: University of Guelph (undergraduate); Diplomatic Academy of Vienna (graduate)
- Website: matthewrae.ca

Matthew Rae MPP is a Canadian politician, who was elected to the Legislative Assembly of Ontario in the 2022 provincial election. He represents the riding of Perth—Wellington as a member of the Progressive Conservative Party of Ontario. He currently serves as the Chief Government Whip (Ontario) alongside his role as the Ontario Associate Minister of Energy-Intensive Industries.

== Background ==
Rae grew up in Harriston, Ontario, and was raised on his family’s dairy farm. After graduating from the Norwell District Secondary School, Rae attended the University of Guelph to study Political Science and International Development.

Rae graduated from the University of Guelph with a degree in Political Science and International Development before attending the Diplomatic Academy of Vienna to pursue a degree in Masters of Advanced International Studies. While in Vienna, Rae worked as an intern for the Embassy of the Republic of Malta as an assistant for the Maltese ambassador.

== Politics ==
After graduation, Rae accepted a job as a Communications Manager for John Nater, Member of Parliament for Perth-Wellington. He also worked for former Member of Provincial Parliament, Randy Pettapiece as his Executive Assistant. Prior to seeking office, Rae worked for Shad Canada as their Director of University Relations.

On November 18, 2021, Rae announced he would seek the Progressive-Conservative nomination for Perth-Wellington after Randy Pettapiece announced he would not seek re-election. Rae would win the Progressive Conservative nomination for the riding of Perth-Wellington on March 5, 2022. Rae placed first in the June 2, 2022, local provincial election, with 46.8% of the vote.

Shortly after being elected, Rae would be appointed as the Parliamentary Assistant to the Minister of Education, Stephen Lecce. Rae was also elected Vice Chair of the Standing Committee on Procedure and House Affairs as well as also serving on the Standing Committee on Social Policy. Rae currently serves on the Standing Committee of Heritage, Infrastructure, and Cultural Policy.

On March 10, 2023, Rae became the Parliamentary Assistant to the Minister of Municipal Affairs and Housing.

On October 18, 2023, Rae introduced his first motion, Motion 63. The motion called upon the Ontario Government to continue to build out its clean, green nuclear fleet. Motion 63 passed on division on October 19, 2023. Rae also introduced his second motion on October 31, 2023, Motion 71. The motion calls on the Government of Canada to eliminate the carbon tax on natural gas and propane used for agricultural purposes. Motion 71 is still to be debate in the Legislative Assembly of Ontario.

In October 2023, Rae introduced his first Private Members’ Public Bill, the Life Leases Act, 2024. Bill 141 aims to improve the transparency, and accountability for occupants in Life Lease Communities.

In April 2024, Rae introduced his second Private Members' Public Bill, the Growing Agritourism Act. Bill 186 is the first legislation in Canada that aims to mitigate risks involved with agritourism operations on farms across Ontario by mandating the display of inherent risks associated with farms.

On April 7, 2025, Rae became the Chief Government Whip (Ontario) alongside his parliamentary assistant role, becoming the second youngest Member of Provincial Parliament to serve in the role. The role is responsible for ensuring that members of the governing party attend and vote in the legislature. In essence, the Office of the Chief Government Whip is indispensable for the smooth functioning of the government within the Legislative Assembly. It ensures the government can effectively advance its legislative agenda and maintain its stability.

== Electoral history ==
2025 Ontario general election: Perth—Wellington
Party	Candidate	Votes	%	±%
Progressive Conservative	Matthew Rae	21,285	47.40	+0.59
Liberal	Ashley Fox	12,519	27.88	+11.75
New Democratic	Jason Davis	5,666	12.62	–9.43
Green	Ian Morton	3,381	7.53	+1.21
New Blue	James Montgomery	1,354	3.01	–2.89
Ontario Party	Sarah Zenuh	475	1.06	–1.31
Freedom	Rob Smink	229	0.51	+0.07
Total valid votes		44,909	99.47	
Total rejected, unmarked and declined ballots		241	0.53	–0.01
Turnout		45,150	52.68	+2.59
Eligible voters		85,702		
Progressive Conservative hold		Swing		–5.58
Source: Elections Ontario

2022 Ontario general election: Perth—Wellington
Party	Candidate	Votes	%	±%	Expenditures
Progressive Conservative	Matthew Rae	19,468	46.80	–3.87	$78,758
New Democratic	Jo-Dee Burbach	9,170	22.04	–8.66	$56,081
Liberal	Ashley Fox	6,708	16.13	+5.32	$30,153
Green	Laura Bisutti	2,627	6.32	+0.45	$426
New Blue	Bob Hosken	2,457	5.91	–	$7,326
Ontario Party	Sandy William MacGregor	985	2.37	–	$846
Freedom	Robby Smink	182	0.44	+0.17	$0
Total valid votes/expense limit		41,597	99.45	–	$117,096
Total rejected, unmarked and declined ballots		229	0.55	–0.87	
Turnout		41,826	50.09	–10.25	
Eligible voters		83,497			
Progressive Conservative hold		Swing		+2.40	
Source: Elections Ontario
