= Walter Knox =

Canadian track and field athlete

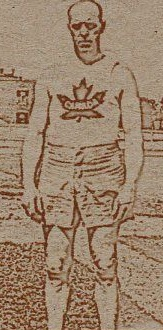
- Born: Walter Knox; 1880; Listowel, Ontario, Canada
- Died: March 3, 1951 (aged 70–71); St. Petersburg, Florida, US
- Occupations: Athlete and athletics coach

Walter Renwick Knox (1878 – March 3, 1951) was a Canadian track and field athlete.

Born in Listowel, Ontario, Knox moved to Orillia, Ontario at the age of 15. In 1903, he attended Beloit College in Wisconsin. At the 1907 Canadian track championships, Knox won five national titles: 100 yards, pole vault, long jump, discus, and shot put. He toured the United States in 1908 and 1909 and competed in England and Scotland in 1911 and 1913. At his peak he was considered by many to be the finest all-round athlete in the world.

In August or September 1909 he challenged World Heavyweight boxing champion Jack Johnson to a sprint, for a cash prize of $1,000. Despite Johnson's willingness the challenge never came off.

In 1912, he competed for the all-round professional championship against American John A. MacDonald, with Knox winning seven of the 10 events and the world title. He won the all-round world title again in 1914, defeating F.R. Cramb of Scotland in Manchester by winning six of eight events. Knox coached the Canadian track and field team at the 1912 Summer Olympics in Stockholm and later became a travelling coach for the Ontario Athletic Commission and a coach at Queen's University. He was also hired to coach the British team at the 1916 Summer Olympics in Berlin, but this never came to fruition due to the First World War. Whilst competing, and then coaching, he invested heavily in a silver mine, mainly worked by his brother Jack. This venture proffered great success. He died in St. Petersburg, Florida at age 73 after suffering a stroke. He was buried in Wellington, Ontario.

He was inducted into Canada's Sports Hall of Fame, the Canadian Olympic Hall of Fame in 1960, and the Orillia Hall of Fame in 1966.
