= Perth (provincial electoral district) =

Former provincial electoral district in Ontario, Canada

Ontario electoral district

Defunct provincial electoral district
- Legislature: Legislative Assembly of Ontario
- District created: 1934
- District abolished: 1996
- First contested: 1934
- Last contested: 1995

Perth was a provincial electoral district in Ontario, Canada, which was created for the 1934 election. It was abolished prior to the 1999 election. It was merged into the riding of Perth-Middlesex.

== Members of Provincial Parliament ==
Perth
Assembly	Years	Member	Party
Created in 1934 from Perth North and Perth South
19th	1934–1937	William Angus Dickson (Note: In 1938, the title of Member of the Legislative Assembly was officially changed to Member of Provincial Parliament. Previously, it was unofficially used in the media and in the Legislature.)	Liberal
20th	1937–1943	William Angus Dickson	Liberal
21st	1943–1945	William Angus Dickson	Liberal
22nd	1945–1948	J. Fred Edwards	Progressive Conservative
23rd	1948–1951	J. Fred Edwards	Progressive Conservative
24th	1951–1955	J. Fred Edwards	Progressive Conservative
25th	1955–1959	J. Fred Edwards	Progressive Conservative
26th	1959–1963	J. Fred Edwards	Progressive Conservative
27th	1963–1967	J. Fred Edwards	Progressive Conservative
28th	1967–1971	Hugh Edighoffer	Liberal
29th	1971–1975	Hugh Edighoffer	Liberal
30th	1975–1977	Hugh Edighoffer	Liberal
31st	1977–1981	Hugh Edighoffer	Liberal
32nd	1981–1985	Hugh Edighoffer	Liberal
33rd	1985–1987	Hugh Edighoffer	Liberal
34th	1987–1990	Hugh Edighoffer	Liberal
35th	1990–1995	Karen Haslam	New Democratic
36th	1995–1999	Bert Johnson	Progressive Conservative
Sourced from the Ontario Legislative Assembly
Merged into Perth-Middlesex after 1996

== Election results ==
1995 Ontario general election
Party	Candidate	Votes	%	±%
Progressive Conservative	Bert Johnson	13,735	44.81	+17.76
New Democratic	Karen Haslam	8,445	27.55	–9.28
Liberal	Gerry Teahen	7,722	25.19	–2.23
Freedom	Robby Smink	427	1.39	–
Independent	Patrick Van Galen	326	1.06	–
Total valid votes		30,655	99.26	
Total rejected, unmarked and declined ballots		228	0.74	+0.04
Turnout		30,883	62.90	–3.34
Eligible voters		49,097		
Progressive Conservative gain from New Democratic		Swing		+13.52
Source: Elections Ontario

1990 Ontario general election
Party	Candidate	Votes	%	±%
New Democratic	Karen Haslam	11,712	36.83	+16.20
Liberal	Gerry Teahen	8,721	27.42	–33.77
Progressive Conservative	Ron Christie	8,600	27.04	+8.87
Family Coalition	Gordon Maloney	2,769	8.71	–
Total valid votes		31,802	99.30	
Total rejected, unmarked and declined ballots		225	0.70	+0.26
Turnout		32,027	66.24	+3.13
Eligible voters		48,350		
New Democratic gain from Liberal		Swing		+24.99
Source: Elections Ontario

1987 Ontario general election
Party	Candidate	Votes	%	±%
Liberal	Hugh Edighoffer	18,037	61.20	–8.12
New Democratic	Warren Ham	6,080	20.63	+10.96
Progressive Conservative	Ron Christie	5,357	18.18	–2.84
Total valid votes		29,474	99.55	
Total rejected ballots		132	0.45	+0.08
Turnout		29,606	63.11	+0.93
Eligible voters		46,909		
Liberal hold		Swing		–9.54
Source: Elections Ontario

1985 Ontario general election
Party	Candidate	Votes	%	±%
Liberal	Hugh Edighoffer	20,040	69.31	+6.80
Progressive Conservative	Glynn Coghlin	6,076	21.02	–9.25
New Democratic	Warren Ham	2,796	9.67	+2.45
Total valid votes		28,912	99.63	
Total rejected ballots		106	0.37	+0.11
Turnout		29,018	62.19	+3.34
Eligible voters		46,662		
Liberal hold		Swing		+8.02
Source: Elections Ontario

1981 Ontario general election
Party	Candidate	Votes	%	±%
Liberal	Hugh Edighoffer	16,283	62.51	–6.37
Progressive Conservative	Colleen Misener	7,883	30.26	+7.35
New Democratic	Scott Wilson	1,881	7.22	–0.98
Total valid votes		26,047	99.74	
Total rejected ballots		67	0.26	+0.03
Turnout		26,114	58.85	–1.79
Eligible voters		44,375		
Liberal hold		Swing		–6.86
Source: Elections Ontario

1977 Ontario general election
Party	Candidate	Votes	%	±%
Liberal	Hugh Edighoffer	18,201	68.88	+5.52
Progressive Conservative	Vivian Jarvis	6,056	22.92	–3.28
New Democratic	Carson McLauchlan	2,167	8.20	–2.24
Total valid votes		26,424	99.77	
Total rejected ballots		61	0.23	+0.00
Turnout		26,485	60.63	–4.47
Eligible voters		43,680		
Liberal hold		Swing		+4.40
Source: Elections Ontario

1975 Ontario general election
Party	Candidate	Votes	%	±%
Liberal	Hugh Edighoffer	17,865	63.36	+9.04
Progressive Conservative	Bob Smith	7,387	26.20	–5.36
New Democratic	Larry J. Wraith	2,945	10.44	–3.68
Total valid votes		28,197	99.77	
Total rejected ballots		64	0.23	–0.04
Turnout		28,261	65.10	–9.25
Eligible voters		43,411		
Liberal hold		Swing		+7.20
Source: Elections Ontario

1971 Ontario general election
Party	Candidate	Votes	%	±%
Liberal	Hugh Edighoffer	16,265	54.31	+10.86
Progressive Conservative	Lloyd Michel	9,450	31.56	–11.08
New Democratic	V. Larry McIntosh	4,231	14.13	+0.22
Total valid votes		29,946	99.73	
Total rejected ballots		81	0.27	–0.47
Turnout		30,027	74.35	+8.65
Eligible voters		40,388		
Liberal hold		Swing		+10.97
Source: Elections Ontario

1967 Ontario general election
Party	Candidate	Votes	%	±%
Liberal	Hugh Edighoffer	9,971	43.45	+5.24
Progressive Conservative	J. Fred Edwards	9,784	42.64	–19.15
New Democratic	V. Larry McIntosh	3,191	13.91	–
Total valid votes		22,946	99.26	
Total rejected ballots		170	0.74	–0.07
Turnout		23,116	65.70	+2.26
Eligible voters		35,186		
Liberal gain from Progressive Conservative		Swing		+12.20
Source: Elections Ontario

1963 Ontario general election
Party	Candidate	Votes	%	±%
Progressive Conservative	J. Fred Edwards	13,324	61.79	+10.08
Liberal	Hugh Edighoffer	8,240	38.21	–2.71
Total valid votes		21,564	99.20	
Total rejected ballots		174	0.80	+0.01
Turnout		21,738	63.44	–4.92
Eligible voters		34,266		
Progressive Conservative hold		Swing		+6.40
Source: Elections Ontario

1959 Ontario general election
Party	Candidate	Votes	%	±%
Progressive Conservative	J. Fred Edwards	11,791	51.70	–1.73
Liberal	Willoet Kelterborn	9,333	40.93	–5.64
Co-operative Commonwealth	Frank Wraith	1,681	7.37	–
Total valid votes		22,805	99.21	
Total rejected ballots		182	0.79	+0.05
Turnout		22,987	68.36	–0.81
Eligible voters		33,625		
Progressive Conservative hold		Swing		+1.96
Source: Elections Ontario

1955 Ontario general election
Party	Candidate	Votes	%	±%
Progressive Conservative	J. Fred Edwards	12,247	53.43	+3.22
Liberal	Lawrence Feick	10,673	46.57	+7.41
Total valid votes		22,920	99.26	
Total rejected ballots		171	0.74	+0.04
Turnout		23,091	69.17	+0.06
Eligible voters		33,384		
Progressive Conservative hold		Swing		–2.10
Source: Elections Ontario

1951 Ontario general election
Party	Candidate	Votes	%	±%
Progressive Conservative	J. Fred Edwards	11,697	50.21	+5.18
Liberal	Lincoln J. White	9,120	39.15	–1.35
Co-operative Commonwealth	Ernest Byers	2,477	10.63	–3.83
Total valid votes		23,294	99.30	
Total rejected ballots		164	0.70	+0.21
Turnout		23,458	69.11	+0.95
Eligible voters		33,943		
Progressive Conservative hold		Swing		+3.26
Source: Elections Ontario

1948 Ontario general election
Party	Candidate	Votes	%	±%
Progressive Conservative	J. Fred Edwards	10,686	45.04	–3.20
Liberal	J. Maurice King	9,609	40.50	–0.15
Co-operative Commonwealth	Bert Davies	3,432	14.46	+3.35
Total valid votes		23,727	99.51	
Total rejected ballots		117	0.49	+0.02
Turnout		23,844	68.16	–3.73
Eligible voters		34,981		
Progressive Conservative hold		Swing		–1.52
Source: Elections Ontario

1945 Ontario general election
Party	Candidate	Votes	%	±%
Progressive Conservative	J. Fred Edwards	12,302	48.24	+9.04
Liberal	William Angus Dickson	10,367	40.65	+1.36
Co-operative Commonwealth	Bert Davies	2,835	11.12	–10.41
Total valid votes		25,504	99.53	
Total rejected ballots		121	0.47	–0.09
Turnout		25,625	71.89	+12.99
Eligible voters		35,643		
Progressive Conservative gain from Liberal		Swing		+3.84
Source: Elections Ontario

1943 Ontario general election
Party	Candidate	Votes	%	±%
Liberal	William Angus Dickson	7,563	39.29	–20.52
Progressive Conservative	J. Fred Edwards	7,545	39.19	–1.00
Co-operative Commonwealth	Bert Davies	4,143	21.52	–
Total valid votes		19,251	99.44	
Total rejected ballots		109	0.56	–0.18
Turnout		19,360	58.90	–16.90
Eligible voters		32,867		
Liberal hold		Swing		–9.76
Source: Elections Ontario

1937 Ontario general election
Party	Candidate	Votes	%	±%
Liberal	William Angus Dickson	15,547	59.80	–0.42
Conservative	Thomas E. Henry	10,450	40.20	+0.42
Total valid votes		25,997	99.26	
Total rejected ballots		195	0.74	+0.17
Turnout		26,192	75.80	–3.08
Eligible voters		34,553		
Liberal hold		Swing		–0.42
Source: Elections Ontario

1934 Ontario general election
Party	Candidate	Votes	%
Liberal	William Angus Dickson	16,371	60.23
Conservative	Charles Edward Richardson	10,811	39.77
Total valid votes		27,182	99.42
Total rejected ballots		158	0.58
Turnout		27,340	78.88
Eligible voters		34,660	
Liberal pickup new district.			
Source: Elections Ontario

== See also ==
- List of Ontario provincial electoral districts
- Canadian provincial electoral districts
