= Hugh Edighoffer =

Canadian politician (1928–2019)

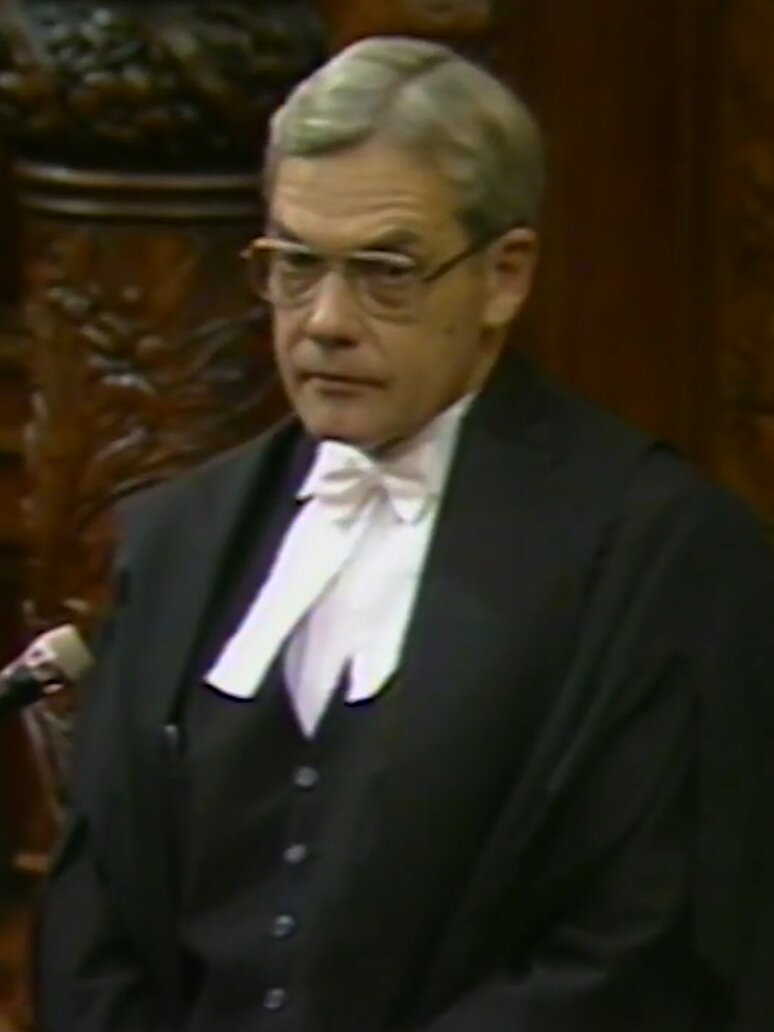
- Edighoffer in 1986

Ontario MPP
- In office 1967–1990
- Preceded by: J. Fred Edwards
- Succeeded by: Karen Haslam
- Constituency: Perth

Personal details
- Born: Hugh Alden Edighoffer; July 22, 1928 Stratford, Ontario, Canada
- Died: July 2, 2019 (aged 90) Mitchell, Ontario, Canada
- Party: Liberal
- Occupation: Businessman

Hugh Alden Edighoffer (July 22, 1928 – July 2, 2019) was a politician in Ontario, Canada. He served in the Legislative Assembly of Ontario as a Liberal member from 1967 to 1990, and was Speaker of the legislature during the administration of David Peterson.

== Background ==
Edighoffer was born in 1928 at Stratford, Ontario, grew up in Mitchell, was educated at Pickering College and worked as a retail merchant in the clothing business before entering provincial politics. He also served on the town council for Mitchell in 1958 and 1959 and was mayor from 1960 to 1961.

== Politics ==
He ran for the Ontario legislature in the 1963 election, but lost to Progressive Conservative J. Fred Edwards by over 5,000 votes in the constituency of Perth. Edighoffer ran again in the 1967 election, and defeated Edwards by 187 votes. He was re-elected without difficulty in the elections of 1971, 1975, 1977, 1981, 1985, and 1987.

The Liberal Party, which had been out of power since 1943, formed a minority government after the election of 1985. Edighoffer, who had served as Deputy Speaker in a previous minority parliament, was appointed Speaker of the Legislature on June 4, 1985 after the toppling of the Frank Miller's government in a motion of non-confidence. Edighoffer was nominated and seconded for the Speaker's position by the leaders of all three political parties represented in the legislature, and was generally regarded as an impartial officeholder. He was re-appointed as speaker on November 3, 1987 following that year's provincial election. He served in the position for another three years, and did not seek re-election in 1990.

Edighoffer's painting in the Ontario legislature was painted by Istvan Nyikos, a Hungarian-born Canadian artist.

=== Parliamentary positions ===
Special Parliamentary Responsibilities
Predecessor	Title	Successor
John Melville Turner	Speaker; 1985-1990	David William Warner
Jack Stokes	Deputy Speaker; 1977-1981	Sam Cureatz
