= Kurtzville, Ontario =

Kurtzville
- Town
- Interactive map of Kurtzville
- Coordinates: 43°48′22″N 80°59′57″W
- Country: Canada
- Province: Ontario
- County: Perth
- Township: North Perth

Government
  - Type: Municipality of North Perth
- Elevation: 376 m (1,234 ft)
- Time zone: UTC-5 (EST)
  - Summer (DST): UTC-4 (EDT)
- Area code: 519

Kurtzville is a small settlement located in the former township of Wallace, which was amalgamated into the town of North Perth, Ontario in 1999. It is located around Perth Line 88 and Perth Road 175 There is an arena in Kurtzville as well as tennis courts. The Kurtzville arena is home to the Wallace Sabres minor hockey teams. Although Kurtzville is a small village, it is home to a lumber yard, welding shop and grain elevator.

In 2008, Kurtzville was the site of the 150th Wallace Township anniversary. This July weekend-long celebration included a parade, dance and dinner festivities.
