= Gowanstown =

- Town
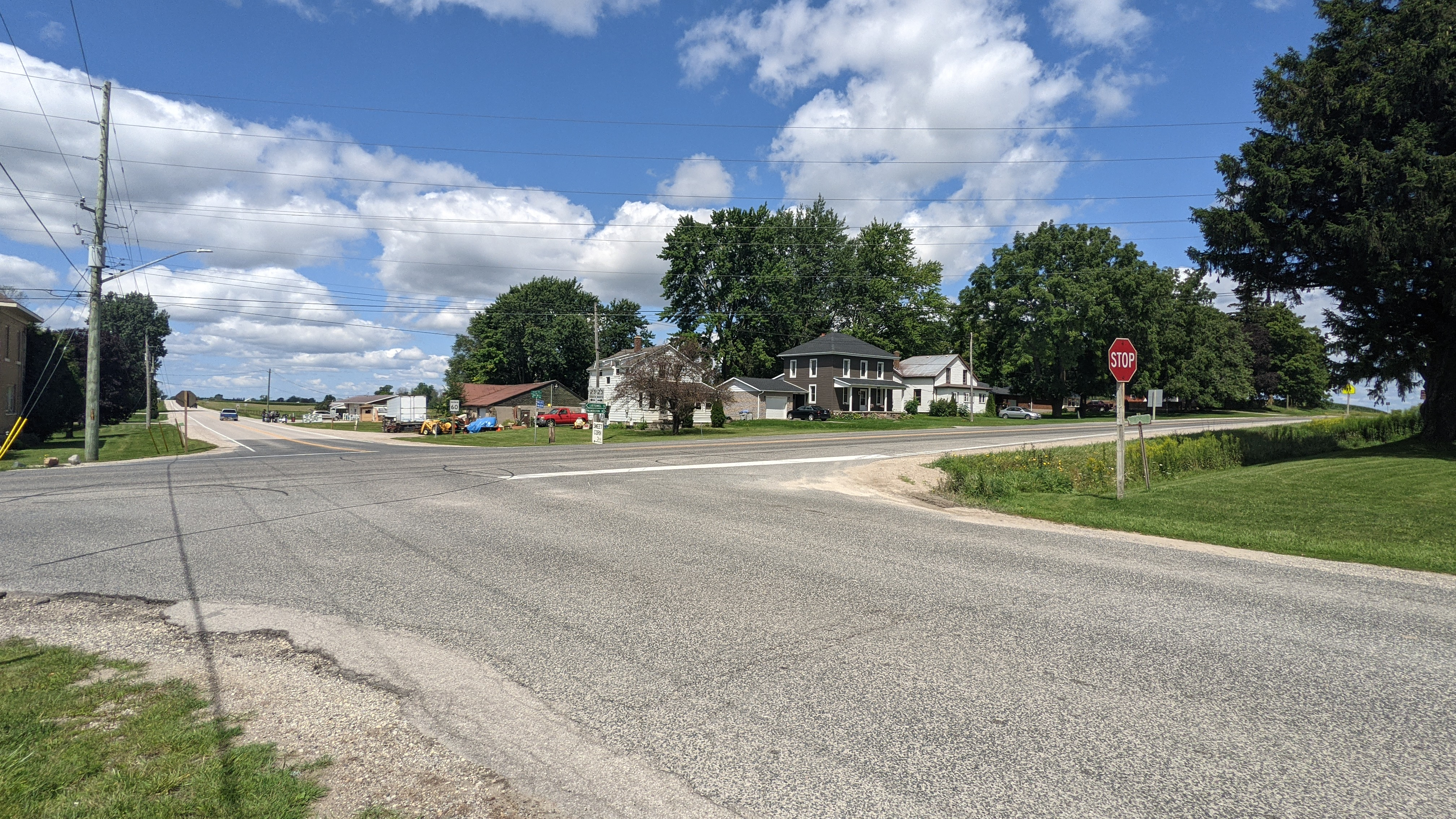
- Interactive map of Gowanstown
- Coordinates: 43°46′21″N 80°55′15″W
- Country: Canada
- Province: Ontario
- County: Perth
- Township: North Perth

Government
  - Type: Municipality of North Perth
- Elevation: 391 m (1,283 ft)
- Time zone: UTC-5 (EST)
  - Summer (DST): UTC-4 (EDT)
- Area code: 519

Gowanstown is a community in Southwestern Ontario. It is a part of the town of North Perth in Perth County. It is located around the intersection of Perth Road 164 and Perth Line 88

The population of Gowanstown is approximately 200. Gowanstown contains a public school and municipal building. A bakery also selling coffee, on-farm corn sales and an ice cream shop which is now a Car Dealership are amongst retailers in the community.

The Gowanstown post office, situated within the municipal building, serves also as a social hub for the community.

== History ==
In the 1970s and 1980s a General Store was located in the same building as the current Post Office but due to the close location of larger towns, like Listowel and Palmerston it closed.

The most well-known resident of Gowanstown is Ann Voskamp, author of One Thousand Gifts, a Christian book dealing with being thankful for small treasures. The book is very popular among Christian readers, and has received national media attention in the United States.
