= J. Fred Edwards =

Canadian politician (1902–1978)

Ontario MPP
- In office 1945–1967
- Preceded by: William Angus Dickson
- Succeeded by: Hugh Edighoffer
- Constituency: Perth

Personal details
- Born: April 8, 1902 Palmerston, Ontario, Canada
- Died: February 9, 1978 (aged 75) Toronto, Ontario, Canada
- Party: Progressive Conservative
- Spouse: Thora McCartney
- Occupation: Businessman

James Frederick Edwards (April 8, 1902 – February 9, 1978) was a politician in Ontario, Canada. He was a Progressive Conservative member who represented Perth in the Legislative Assembly of Ontario from 1945 to 1967.

== Background ==
Edwards was born in Palmerston, Ontario in 1902. He operated the J. Fred Edwards Rexall Drug Store in Palmerston from at least 1938. Edwards was married to Thora McCartney (1897–1977) and they are buried at Palmerston Cemetery in Palmerston, Ontario.

== Politics ==
Edwards was elected in the general election in 1945, Edwards was re-elected in the general elections in 1948, 1951, 1955, 1959, and 1963. He served as a backbench supporter in the governments of George Drew, Thomas Laird Kennedy, Leslie Frost and John Robarts. Despite his lengthy time in office, Edwards did not serve in Cabinet, rather he served on a wide variety of Standing Committees of the Legislative Assembly, sitting on as many as ten committees, simultaneously. In the 1967 general election, Edwards lost by 187 votes to the Liberal candidate, Hugh Edighoffer. He retired from public life after the election.
