= Karen Haslam =

Canadian politician

The Honourable Karen Haslam ECO

Mayor of Stratford, Ontario
- In office 2000–2003
- Preceded by: Dave Hunt
- Succeeded by: Dan Mathieson

Ontario MPP
- In office 1990–1995
- Preceded by: Hugh Edighoffer
- Succeeded by: Bert Johnson
- Constituency: Perth

Personal details
- Born: April 19, 1946 (age 80) St. Catharines, Ontario, Canada
- Party: New Democrat
- Children: 2
- Occupation: Teacher

Karen Haslam (born April 19, 1946) is a former politician in Ontario, Canada. She was a New Democratic Party member of the Legislative Assembly of Ontario from 1990 to 1995 and served as a minister in the government of Bob Rae. From 2000 to 2003, she served as the mayor of Stratford, Ontario.

== Background ==
Haslam was a teacher and librarian before entering public life. She was elected as a Rate Payer's trustee in Beaver Bank, Nova Scotia in 1984, and as a school board trustee in Stratford in 1987.

== Provincial politics ==
She ran for the Ontario legislature in the 1990 provincial election in the southwestern riding of Perth. She won the election defeating Liberal Gerry Teahen by 2,985 votes. The NDP won a majority government and Haslam was appointed as a Deputy Speaker. On July 31, 1991, she was promoted to cabinet as Minister of Culture and Communications.

In October 1991, a humorous incident occurred when Haslam was escorting Prince Charles on a tour of the Art Gallery of Ontario (AGO) when she caught her heel in a door sill and her shoe fell off. Charles gallantly picked it up and offered it back to her. She said, "My gracious, my prince is handing me my shoe... Thank goodness it fits."

During her time as minister she established a publishing centre for the book and magazine industry. She also managed a funding shortage that occurred at the AGO. In 1991 the AGO asked for an additional $6 million for its operating grant. Due to financial constraints, Haslam was unable to agree the request. In July 1992 the AGO was planning a three-month closure for a scheduled expansion but instead it closed for seven months and laid off half of its staff. Haslam convened a task force to review the operation of the AGO led by Glenn Lowry. In November the task force released its findings. If found the operations "basically sound" but the gallery needed to "reduce its dependency on government funding." When the expanded gallery reopened in January 1993, Haslam announced an additional $2 million in funding.

On February 3, 1993 she was demoted to junior position in cabinet as Associate Minister of Health assisting Minister of Health Ruth Grier.

She subsequently emerged as a prominent opponent of the Rae government's Social Contract austerity legislation, which revised labour contracts and mandated unpaid leave days for many provincial workers. After the government decided to move forward with the legislation, Haslam resigned her cabinet position on June 14, 1993. She was the only cabinet minister in the Rae government to resign on principle over this matter. Later, she joined with maverick NDP MPPs Peter Kormos and Mark Morrow and former New Democrat Dennis Drainville to vote against the legislation.

Haslam's decision won her the respect of many dissidents within the party. The NDP were defeated in the 1995 provincial election, and Haslam lost her own seat to Progressive Conservative Bert Johnson, but she managed a credible second-place finish in a riding where the NDP had little historical support.

=== Cabinet positions ===
Rae ministry, Province of Ontario (1990–1995)
Cabinet post (1)
Predecessor	Office	Successor
Rosario Marchese	Minister of Culture and Communications; 1991–1993	Anne Swarbrick (Note: The ministry was folded into a super-ministry called Culture, Tourism and Recreation led by Anne Swarbrick.)

== Municipal politics ==
In 1999, Haslam supported Canadian Union of Public Employees workers in Stratford during a protracted strike in the city. The following year, she scored an upset victory over incumbent Dave Hunt for mayor of the city, winning by 6305 votes to 4228. She was defeated in 2003 in her bid for re-election winning only 12% of the popular vote against two other prominent opponents.

== Later life ==
In October 2005, Haslam took on the position of Provincial Secretary of the Nova Scotia New Democratic Party. She subsequently resigned in March 2006.

Haslam currently serves on the Provincial Conservation Review Board.
