= Perth—Wellington (provincial electoral district) =

Provincial electoral district in Ontario, Canada

Coordinates: 43.801°N 80.939°W

Ontario electoral district
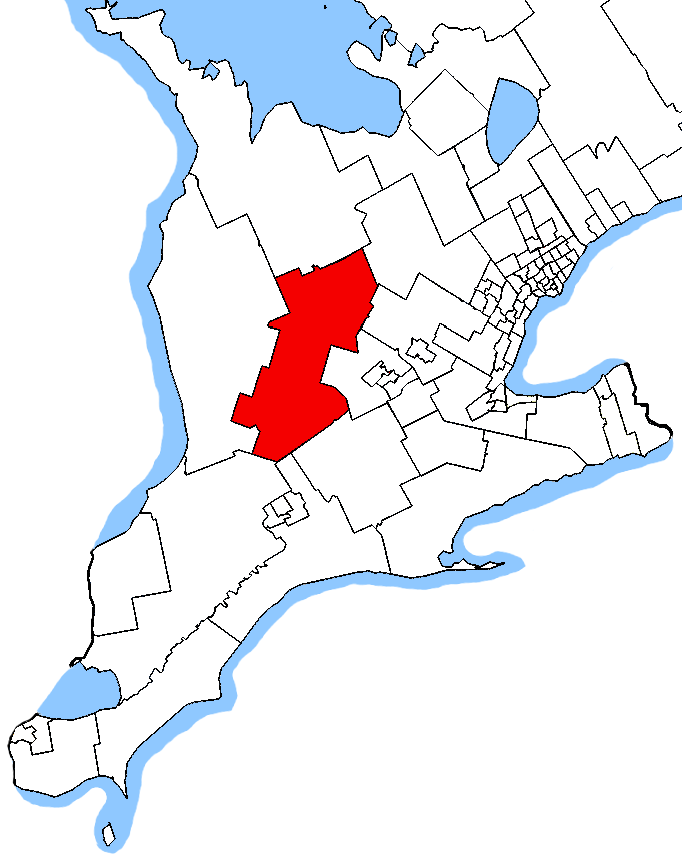
- Perth—Wellington in relation to other southern Ontario ridings

Provincial electoral district
- Legislature: Legislative Assembly of Ontario
MPP
Matthew Rae
Progressive Conservative
- District created: 2006
- First contested: 2007
- Last contested: 2025

Demographics
- Population (2016): 107,905
- Electors (2018): 78,738
- Area (km²): 3,615
- Pop. density (per km²): 29.8
- Census division(s): Perth, Wellington
- Census subdivision(s): Minto, Wellington North, North Perth, Mapleton, West Perth, Perth East, Stratford, Perth South, St. Marys

Perth—Wellington is a provincial electoral district in Ontario, Canada, that has been represented in the Legislative Assembly of Ontario since the 2007 provincial election. It was created in 2003 from parts of Dufferin—Peel—Wellington—Grey, Perth—Middlesex, and Waterloo—Wellington ridings.

The riding consists of the County of Perth, and the Town of Minto and the townships of Mapleton and Wellington North in the County of Wellington.

== Members of Provincial Parliament ==
Perth—Wellington
| Assembly | Years | Member | Party |
|---|---|---|---|
Riding created from Dufferin—Peel—Wellington—Grey, Perth—Middlesex and Waterloo—Wellington
| 39th | 2007–2011 | John Wilkinson | Liberal |
| 40th | 2011–2014 | Randy Pettapiece | Progressive Conservative |
| 41st | 2014–2018 | Randy Pettapiece | Progressive Conservative |
| 42nd | 2018–2022 | Randy Pettapiece | Progressive Conservative |
| 43rd | 2022–2025 | Matthew Rae | Progressive Conservative |
| 44th | 2025–present | Matthew Rae | Progressive Conservative |

== Election results ==
Winning party in each polling division of Perth—Wellington at the 2025 Ontario general election

2025 Ontario general election
| Party | Candidate | Votes | % | ±% |
|---|---|---|---|---|
| Progressive Conservative | Matthew Rae | 21,285 | 47.40 | +0.59 |
| Liberal | Ashley Fox | 12,519 | 27.88 | +11.75 |
| New Democratic | Jason Davis | 5,666 | 12.62 | –9.43 |
| Green | Ian Morton | 3,381 | 7.53 | +1.21 |
| New Blue | James Montgomery | 1,354 | 3.01 | –2.89 |
| Ontario Party | Sarah Zenuh | 475 | 1.06 | –1.31 |
| Freedom | Rob Smink | 229 | 0.51 | +0.07 |
| Total valid votes | | 44,909 | 99.47 | |
| Total rejected, unmarked and declined ballots | | 241 | 0.53 | –0.01 |
| Turnout | | 45,150 | 52.68 | +2.59 |
| Eligible voters | | 85,702 | | |
| Progressive Conservative hold | | Swing | | –5.58 |
Source: Elections Ontario

Winning party in each polling division of Perth—Wellington at the 2022 Ontario general election

2022 Ontario general election
| Party | Candidate | Votes | % | ±% | Expenditures |
|---|---|---|---|---|---|
| Progressive Conservative | Matthew Rae | 19,468 | 46.80 | –3.87 | $78,758 |
| New Democratic | Jo-Dee Burbach | 9,170 | 22.04 | –8.66 | $56,081 |
| Liberal | Ashley Fox | 6,708 | 16.13 | +5.32 | $30,153 |
| Green | Laura Bisutti | 2,627 | 6.32 | +0.45 | $426 |
| New Blue | Bob Hosken | 2,457 | 5.91 | – | $7,326 |
| Ontario Party | Sandy William MacGregor | 985 | 2.37 | – | $846 |
| Freedom | Robby Smink | 182 | 0.44 | +0.17 | $0 |
| Total valid votes/expense limit | | 41,597 | 99.45 | – | $117,096 |
| Total rejected, unmarked and declined ballots | | 229 | 0.55 | –0.87 | |
| Turnout | | 41,826 | 50.09 | –10.25 | |
| Eligible voters | | 83,497 | | | |
| Progressive Conservative hold | | Swing | | +2.40 | |
Source: Elections Ontario

2018 Ontario general election
| Party | Candidate | Votes | % | ±% |
|---|---|---|---|---|
| Progressive Conservative | Randy Pettapiece | 23,736 | 50.67 | +11.71 |
| New Democratic | Michael O'Brien | 14,385 | 30.71 | +11.79 |
| Liberal | Brendan Knight | 5,062 | 10.81 | –22.29 |
| Green | Lisa Olsen | 2,746 | 5.86 | +0.98 |
| Libertarian | Scott Marshall | 380 | 0.81 | –0.19 |
| Consensus Ontario | Paul McKendrick | 320 | 0.68 | – |
| Freedom | Rob Smeenk | 125 | 0.27 | –0.23 |
| Ontario Alliance | Andrew Stanton | 89 | 0.19 | – |
| Total valid votes | | 46,843 | 98.58 | |
| Total rejected, unmarked and declined ballots | | 673 | 1.42 | –0.14 |
| Turnout | | 47,516 | 60.35 | +4.69 |
| Eligible voters | | 78,738 | | |
| Progressive Conservative hold | | Swing | | –0.04 |
Source: Elections Ontario

2014 Ontario general election
| Party | Candidate | Votes | % | ±% |
|---|---|---|---|---|
| Progressive Conservative | Randy Pettapiece | 15,992 | 38.96 | –1.14 |
| Liberal | Stewart Skinner | 13,585 | 33.10 | –6.43 |
| New Democratic | Romayne Smith Fullerton | 7,764 | 18.91 | +3.15 |
| Green | Chris Desjardins | 2,005 | 4.88 | +2.41 |
| Family Coalition | Irma Devries | 746 | 1.82 | +0.12 |
| Libertarian | Scott Marshall | 411 | 1.00 | – |
| Independent | Matthew Murphy | 343 | 0.84 | – |
| Freedom | Robby Smink | 202 | 0.49 | +0.05 |
| Total valid votes | | 41,048 | 98.44 | |
| Total rejected, unmarked and declined ballots | | 650 | 1.56 | +1.17 |
| Turnout | | 41,698 | 55.66 | +3.77 |
| Eligible voters | | 74,914 | | |
| Progressive Conservative hold | | Swing | | +2.65 |
Source: Elections Ontario

2011 Ontario general election
| Party | Candidate | Votes | % | ±% |
|---|---|---|---|---|
| Progressive Conservative | Randy Pettapiece | 14,845 | 40.09 | +8.29 |
| Liberal | John Wilkinson | 14,635 | 39.53 | –7.13 |
| New Democratic | Ellen Papenburg | 5,836 | 15.76 | +5.68 |
| Green | Chris Desjardins | 918 | 2.48 | –5.39 |
| Family Coalition | Irma Nicolette DeVries | 627 | 1.69 | –0.31 |
| Freedom | Robby Smink | 164 | 0.44 | –0.59 |
| Total valid votes | | 37,025 | 99.61 | |
| Total rejected, unmarked and declined ballots | | 144 | 0.39 | –0.24 |
| Turnout | | 37,169 | 51.89 | –2.73 |
| Eligible voters | | 71,629 | | |
| Progressive Conservative gain from Liberal | | Swing | | +7.71 |
Source: Elections Ontario

2007 Ontario general election
| Party | Candidate | Votes | % |
|---|---|---|---|
| Liberal | John Wilkinson | 18,096 | 46.65 |
| Progressive Conservative | John Rutherford | 12,338 | 31.81 |
| New Democratic | Donna Hansen | 3,912 | 10.09 |
| Green | Anita Payne | 3,051 | 7.87 |
| Family Coalition | Pat Bannon | 776 | 2.00 |
| Freedom | Robby Smink | 399 | 1.03 |
| Independent | Kevin Allman | 217 | 0.56 |
| Total valid votes | | 38,789 | 99.37 |
| Total rejected, unmarked and declined ballots | | 246 | 0.63 |
| Turnout | | 39,035 | 54.62 |
| Eligible voters | | 71,462 | |
| Liberal pickup new district. | | | |
Source: Elections Ontario

== 2007 electoral reform referendum ==
2007 Ontario electoral reform referendum
| Side | Votes | % |
|---|---|---|
| First Past the Post | 25,480 | 67.6 |
| Mixed member proportional | 12,218 | 32.4 |
| Total valid votes | 37,698 | 100.0 |

== See also ==
- List of Ontario provincial electoral districts
- Canadian provincial electoral districts
