= John Wilkinson (Ontario politician) =

Canadian politician

The Honourable John Wilkinson ECO

Ontario MPP
- In office 2007–2011
- Preceded by: Riding established
- Succeeded by: Randy Pettapiece
- Constituency: Perth—Wellington
- In office 2003–2007
- Preceded by: Bert Johnson
- Succeeded by: Riding abolished
- Constituency: Perth—Middlesex

More...

Personal details
- Party: Liberal
- Profession: Financial planner

John Wilkinson is a politician in Ontario, Canada. He was a member of the Legislative Assembly of Ontario, from 2003 to 2011 representing the predominantly rural ridings of Perth—Middlesex and Perth—Wellington for the Liberal Party. He served in cabinet as Minister of Research and Innovation, Revenue and Environment. He was defeated in the 2011 election by Conservative Randy Pettapiece.

== Background ==
Before entering public life, Wilkinson was a financial planner in Stratford. He is a certified financial planner and a founder of Wilkinson & Keller Financial Planning Ltd, he is also a former chair of the Municipal Property Assessment Corporation. He also worked as the finance chair of his church organization for seven years. In 2002, he was awarded the Julia Award from the Canadian Cystic Fibrosis Association for his volunteer work. He is a member of the University of Waterloo Stratford Campus Advisory Board.

== Politics ==
Wilkinson ran for the Ontario legislature in the 1999 election, losing to Progressive Conservative incumbent Bert Johnson by over 6000 votes. In the 2003 election, he defeated Johnson by about 1500 votes in a rematch.

The Liberals won the election, and on May 21, 2004 Wilkinson was named parliamentary assistant to Leona Dombrowsky, the Minister of the Environment.

He was re-elected in the 2007 provincial election, and was named to provincial cabinet as Minister of Research and Innovation. In a cabinet shuffle on June 24, 2009, he became the province's Minister of Revenue and on August 18, 2010 became Minister of Environment.

In the 2011 election he was narrowly defeated by Conservative Randy Pettapiece by 210 votes.

=== Cabinet positions ===
McGuinty ministry, Province of Ontario (2003–2013)
Cabinet posts (3)
Predecessor	Office	Successor
John Gerretsen	Minister of Environment; 2010–2011	Jim Bradley
Dwight Duncan	Minister of Revenue; 2009–2010	Sophia Aggelonitis
Dalton McGuinty	Minister of Research and Innovation; 2007–2009	John Milloy

== Electoral record ==
2011 Ontario general election
Party	Candidate	Votes	%	±%
Progressive Conservative	Randy Pettapiece	14,845	40.1	+8.1
Liberal	John Wilkinson	14,635	39.5	-7.7
New Democratic	Ellen Papenburg	5,836	15.8	+5.7
Green	Chris Desjardins	918	2.5	-5.3
Family Coalition	Irma DeVries	627	1.7	-0.3
Freedom	Robby Smink	164	0.4	0.0
Total valid votes		37,025	100.0	

2007 Ontario general election
Party	Candidate	Votes	%	±%
Liberal	John Wilkinson	18,249	47.2%	
Progressive Conservative	John Rutherford	12,391	32.0%	
New Democratic	Donna Hansen	3,922	10.1%	
Green	Anita Payne	2,997	7.8%	
Family Coalition	Pat Bannon	760	2.0%	
Independent	Kevin Allman	216	0.6%	
Freedom	Robby Smink	143	0.4%	

2003 Ontario general election
Party	Candidate	Votes	%	±%
Liberal	John Wilkinson	17,017	42.71	+6.35
Progressive Conservative	Bert Johnson	15,680	39.36	-12.64
New Democratic	Jack Verhulst	4,703	11.8	+4.61
Green	John Cowling	1,201	3.01	
Family Coalition	Pat Bannon	857	2.15	-1.08
Freedom	Robert Smink	384	0.96	

1999 Ontario general election
Party	Candidate	Votes	%	±%
Progressive Conservative	Bert Johnson	22,065	52	
Liberal	John Wilkinson	15,428	36.36	
New Democratic	Walter Edmund Vernon	3,053	7.19	
Family Coalition	Pat Bannon	1,369	3.23	
Freedom	Robert J.W. Smink	521	1.23	
