= John G. Smale =

American businessman (1927-2011)

- Born: August 1, 1927; Listowel, Ontario, Canada
- Died: November 19, 2011; Cincinnati, Ohio, U.S.
- Title: CEO, Procter & Gamble
- Term: 1981 to 1990
- Spouse: Phyllis Weaver
- Children: 4

John Gray Smale (August 1, 1927 - November 19, 2011) was an American businessman, the chief executive (CEO) of Procter & Gamble from 1981 to 1990, and chairman of General Motors from 1992 to 1995.

According to his obituary in The New York Times, he "led Procter & Gamble through a period of extraordinary growth, and then helped engineer a turnaround of General Motors"

== Early life ==
John Gray Smale and his twin sister Joy were born on August 1, 1927, in Listowel, Ontario, Canada, and grew up in Elmhurst, Illinois. Their father worked for the department store chain Marshall Field's as a travelling salesman. He earned a bachelor's degree from Miami University in Oxford, Ohio, in 1949.

== Career ==
In 1949, he joined Vick Chemical Co and worked for them for three years as a salesman (and would eventually lead the acquisition of their successor company, Richardson-Vicks, for $1.2 billion in 1985.

In 1952, he joined Procter & Gamble in dental products and persuaded the American Dental Association to endorse a new product, Crest toothpaste, which went on to become one of P&G's best-selling brands. He rose to become its seventh CEO, a role he held from 1981 to 1990.

== Personal life ==
Smale was married to Phyllis Weaver for 56 years until her death in 2006, and they had four children, John Gray Jr, Peter, Catherine Anne Caldemeyer, and Lisa Smale.

He died at his home in Cincinnati, Ohio, on November 19, 2011, aged 84.
