= Ann Voskamp =

Canadian writer

- Born: North Perth, Ontario, Canada
- Occupations: Author, blogger
- Spouse: Darryl Voskamp
- Children: 7
- Writing career
- Genres: Memoir, children's literature
- Subjects: Spirituality, Christian
- Notable work: One Thousand Gifts
- Website: annvoskamp.com

Ann Voskamp is a Canadian author, blogger, and memoirist on themes of Christian women's spirituality, and the author of multiple books, including the New York Times bestseller, One Thousand Gifts: A Dare to Live Fully Right Where You Are, as well as The Broken Way: A Daring Path Into the Abundant Life and WayMaker: Finding the Way to the Life You’ve Always Dreamed Of.

== Biography ==
Ann Voskamp was born and raised in North Perth, Ontario, in a farming community. She began her blog, titled "A Holy Experience" with a focus on the homeschooling of her children. Voskamp also used the blog to count blessings as a way to address fears, which led to interest from a literary agent. In 2011, her blog was listed as #85 in the Babble.com list of Top 100 Mom Blogs.

In 2010, her memoir One Thousand Gifts: A Dare to Live Fully Right Where You Are was published by Zondervan. It was listed on the New York Times Best Seller list for 60 weeks. It also appeared on Christian bestseller lists, and Voskamp appeared on The Today Show after the book was featured by Kathie Lee Gifford. One Thousand Gifts also received an award of merit in the 2012 Christianity Today Book Awards. On Twitter, a conversation based on the book happened under the hashtag #1000gifts, and was described by The New York Times as "readers share their own moments, like 'seeing the beauty in the mess' and 'sitting down at the table to eat dinner as a family.'"

Selections from One Thousand Gifts was published as a gift book edition in 2012. Her memoir continued in The Broken Way (2016), and Waymaker (2022). In 2022, she announced a children's book, titled Your Brave Song, would be released in early 2023.

Voskamp has also been a supporter of refugee rights, and protested United States refugee policies outside of the 2017 National Prayer Breakfast by holding a sign stating "We Welcome Refugees" and praying, before attending the National Prayer Breakfast as an invited guest. She is a co-founder of the We Welcome Refugees organization, has travelled to Iraq to meet with refugee Yazidi women, and has sponsored refugees from Syria and Africa through the Canadian PSR Programme. She has also worked with Compassion International and other advocacy groups.

Voskamp has also been a contributor to The Huffington Post and WORLD Magazine. She has appeared on The 700 Club, and 100 Huntley Street.

== Selected works ==
- One Thousand Gifts: A Dare to Live Fully Right Where You Are (2010), Zondervan ISBN 9780310412359
- Selections from One Thousand Gifts: Finding Joy in What Really Matters (2012), Zondervan ISBN 9780310313540
- The Greatest Gift: Unwrapping the Full Love Story of Christmas (2013), Tyndale House ISBN 978-1-4143-8708-6
- Unwrapping the Greatest Gift: A Family Celebration of Christmas (2014), Tyndale House ISBN 9781414397542
- The Broken Way: A Daring Path Into the Abundant Life (2016), Zondervan ISBN 9780310346562
- WayMaker: Finding the Way to the Life You’ve Always Dreamed Of (2022), Thomas Nelson ISBN 978-0-310-35219-8

== Personal life ==
Voskamp is married to Darryl Voskamp and they are the parents of seven children. They reside on a farm in North Perth, Ontario.
