= Listowel, Ontario =

Listowel
- Unincorporated community
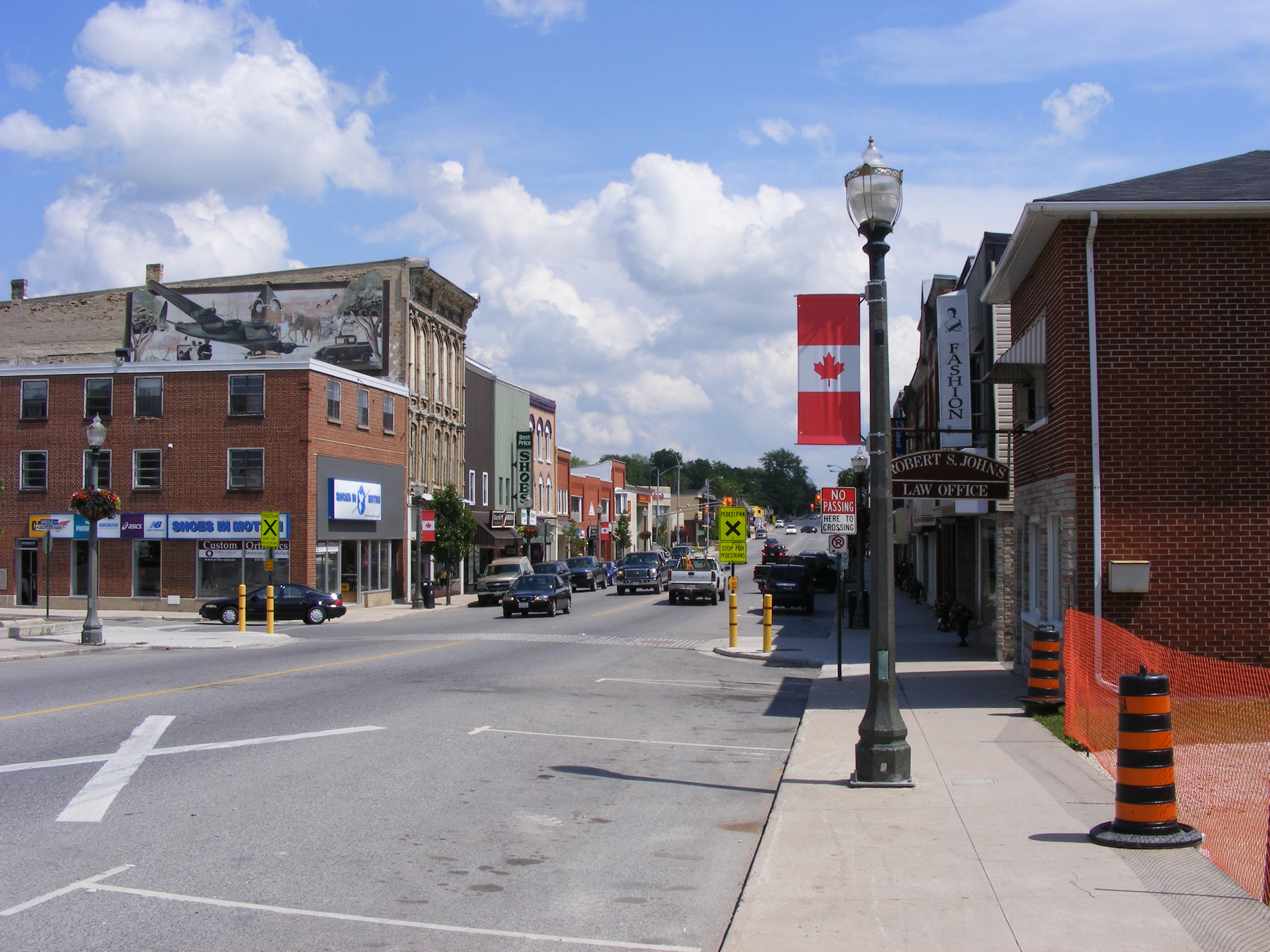
- Main Street

- Location of Listowel in Ontario
- Coordinates: 43°43′54″N 80°57′13″W
- Country: Canada
- Province: Ontario
- County: Perth
- Township: North Perth
- Settled: 1857
- Incorporated (village): 1867
- Incorporated (town): 1875
- Amalgamated: January 1, 1998 into North Perth

Government
  - Type: Municipality of North Perth
- Elevation: 382 m (1,253 ft)

Population (2021 Census)
  - Total: 9,539
- Time zone: UTC-5 (EST)
  - Summer (DST): UTC-4 (EDT)
- Forward sortation area: N4W
- Area codes: 519, 226

Listowel /ˈlɪstəwəl/ is an unincorporated community in Ontario, Canada, located in the Municipality of North Perth. Incorporated as the Town of Listowel in 1875, it was dissolved in 1998 following amalgamation with several other communities in the northern section of Perth County. Its population was 9,539 at the Canada 2021 Census in a land area of 6.73 square kilometres; at the time there were 3,910 occupied dwellings.

== History ==
Listowel was founded in 1852, and was originally called Mapleton. It was renamed in June 1856 after a post office was established, and named after the town of Listowel, in County Kerry, Ireland.

During World War II, the townspeople of Listowel raised $374,100 to fund a Lancaster bomber, which cost $350,000. With a population of around 3,000 and an average annual income of $2,500, the average contribution per person was approximately $124.70. This bomber was in 2 missions during the war and was decommissioned in 1947–48.

=== Economic expansion ===
In 1871 the Wellington, Grey and Bruce Railway extended its line to Listowel. It was joined in 1873 by a second railway, the Stratford and Huron Railway, and Listowel soon became an important shipping point. The arrival of the railway hastened development and Listowel became a Town with a population of 2,054 in 1875 in what is now North Perth in Perth County, Ontario.

In 1877, the first elementary school opened.

Electricity came to Listowel in 1897, and in 1900 the Listowel Furniture Company opened. By 1902 the population had increased to 2,661, and a woolen mill, a planing mill, a flour mill, a brewery and a dairy products exporting company were operating in the town.

=== 1950s–present ===
On February 28, 1959, the roof of the Listowel Memorial Arena collapsed under heavy snow, burying a boys' hockey team playing a scrimmage game. Seven players, along with a referee and recreation director, were killed in the collapse in what was described by the Waterloo Region Record as "Listowel's darkest day". The arena was rebuilt and closed in 2017 following the construction of the Steve Kerr Memorial Complex. The arena was demolished on February 2, 2021.

On March 17, 2011, the local dollar store caught fire and its roof collapsed, killing volunteer firefighters Ray Walter (30) and Ken Rea (56). Listowel mourned the loss, closing major streets and posting black ribbons all over town in honour of the fallen firefighters. Paddyfest festivities continued to honour Kinsman Ray Walter, but in a somber fashion.

Between the 2016 and 2021 censuses, Listowel's population grew by 26.7 percent, helping drive North Perth's population growth to 18.3 percent.

== Education ==
Public education in Listowel is administered by Avon Maitland District School Board; who manage Listowel District Secondary School, Eastdale Public School and Westfield Elementary School. North Perth Westfield Elementary School, an amalgamation of Wallace Public School (in adjacent Wallace township) and Listowel Central Public School, accepted its first cohort of students in September 2016. The former Listowel Central Public School building was subsequently sold and now houses the private Listowel Christian School.

== Culture ==
The Bookery (now the Salvation Army Thrift Store) is a Celtic-inspired book store which stocks about 25,000 books and traditional Celtic, Irish and Scottish jewellery in silver. In addition, they provide gallery space for local artists to display their work. Listowel has also raised musicians from many genres.

=== Paddyfest ===
The official spokesperson for Paddyfest is chosen yearly in the Paddyfest Ambassador Competition. Contestants must perform a speech, impromptu question and interview with the judges and receive the overall highest score to be awarded this position. A separate award of Talent is given out to the contestant with the highest score in the talent competition. Runner-up and Congeniality are also awards which are available. The Paddyfest Ambassador Competition changed its name and official status from being Miss Paddyfest when first created.

Events at the Fest include arm wrestling and a parade.

== Sports ==
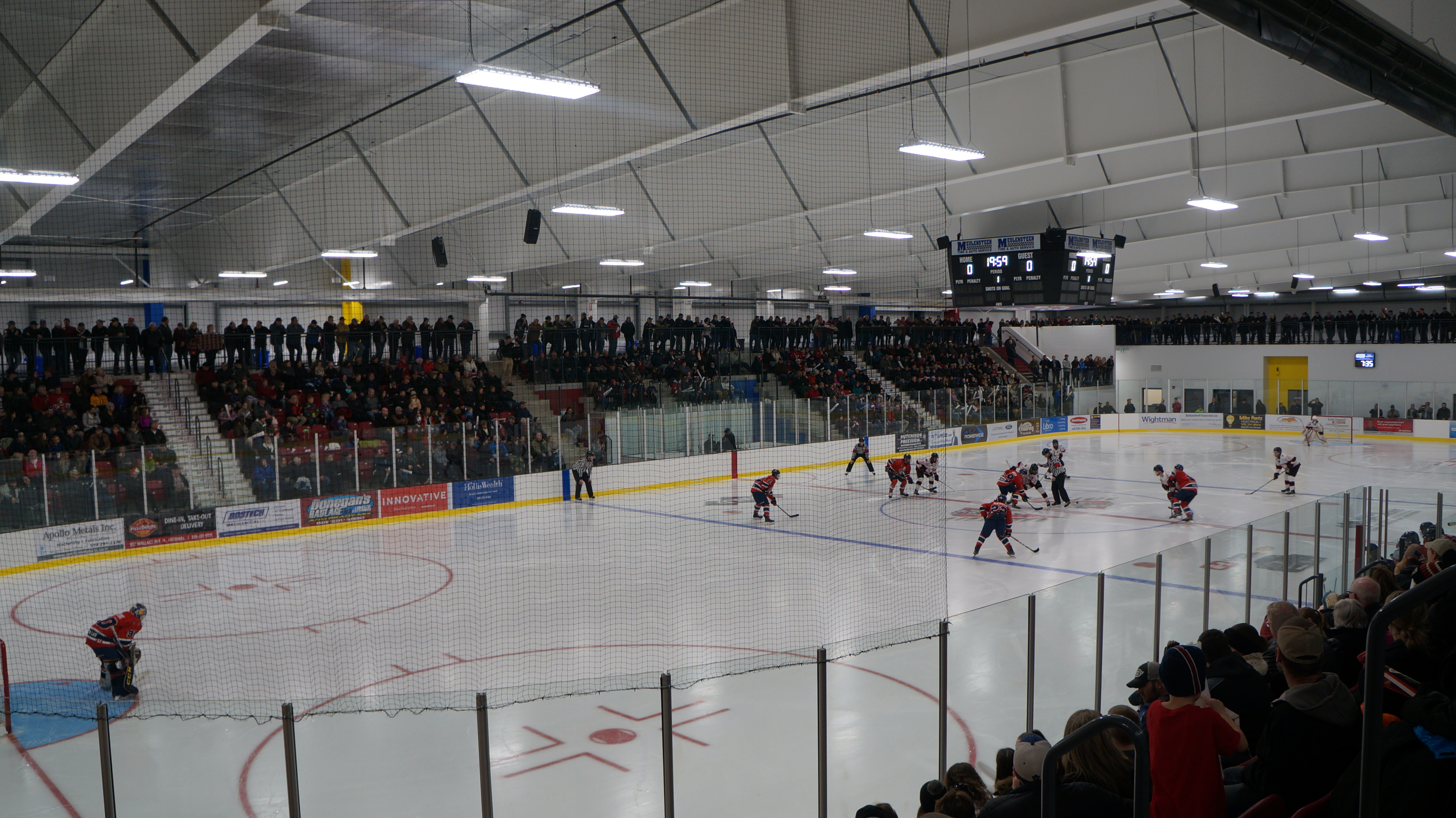
Listowel Cyclones home game

Listowel has a Jr. "B" hockey team from the Greater Ontario Junior Hockey League (Mid-West Conference). They are called the Listowel Cyclones. The town also hosts a baseball team, the Listowel Jr. Legionnaires. Part II Bistro Ladies Classic, a curling bonspiel takes place in Listowel Curling Club.

== Economy ==
The Campbell's was a major local employer for 48 years, operating a frozen, foodservice and specialty food plant in Listowel. This relationship ended abruptly with the announcement of the factory's pending closure on April 28, 2008. In 2010 the former Campbell Soup plant was purchased by Erie Meat Products and expected to ship 50-60 million pounds of poultry to world markets on an annual basis.

Since 1996 the area around Listowel has attracted new industries.

== Notable people ==
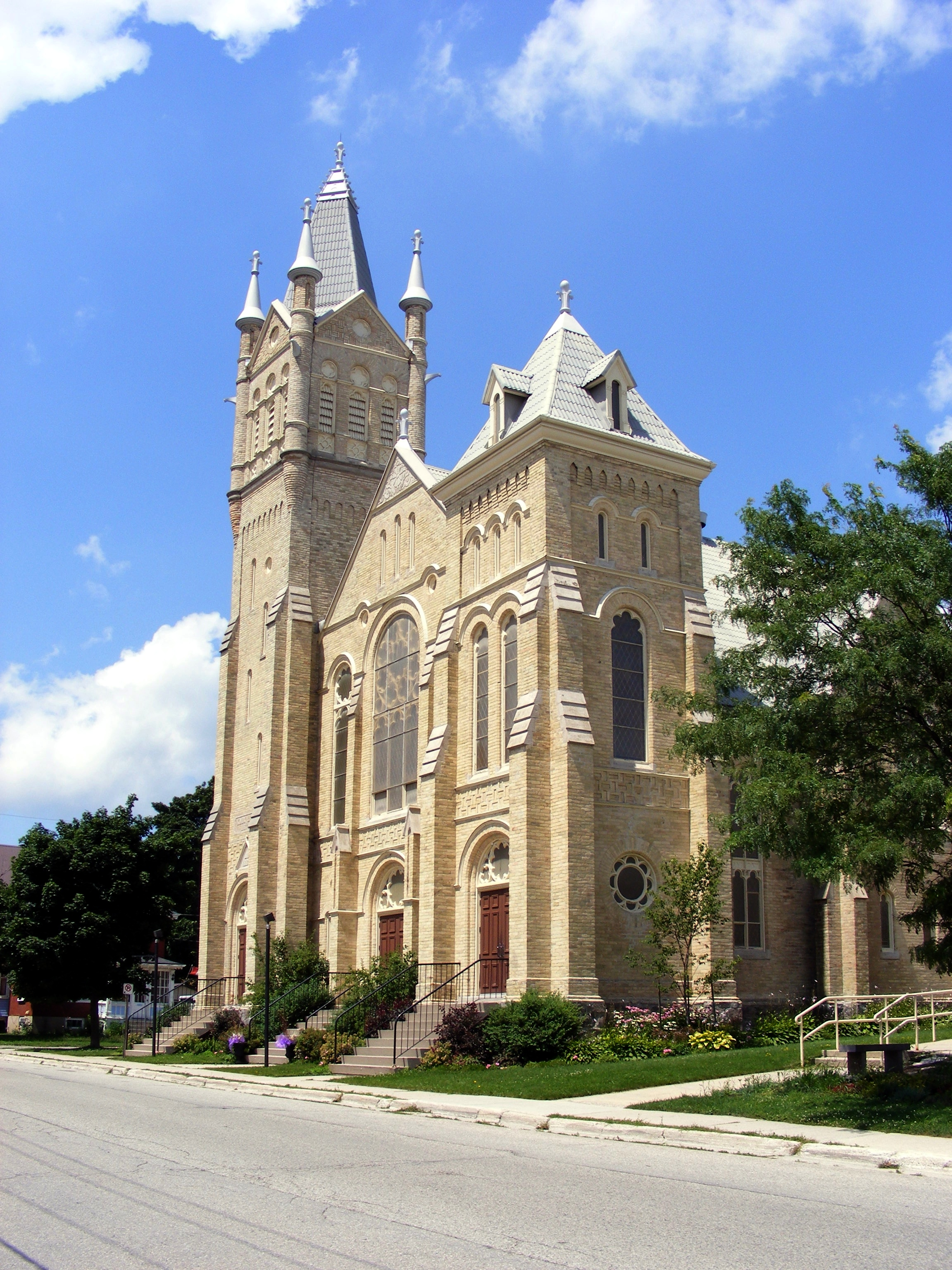
Knox Presbyterian church

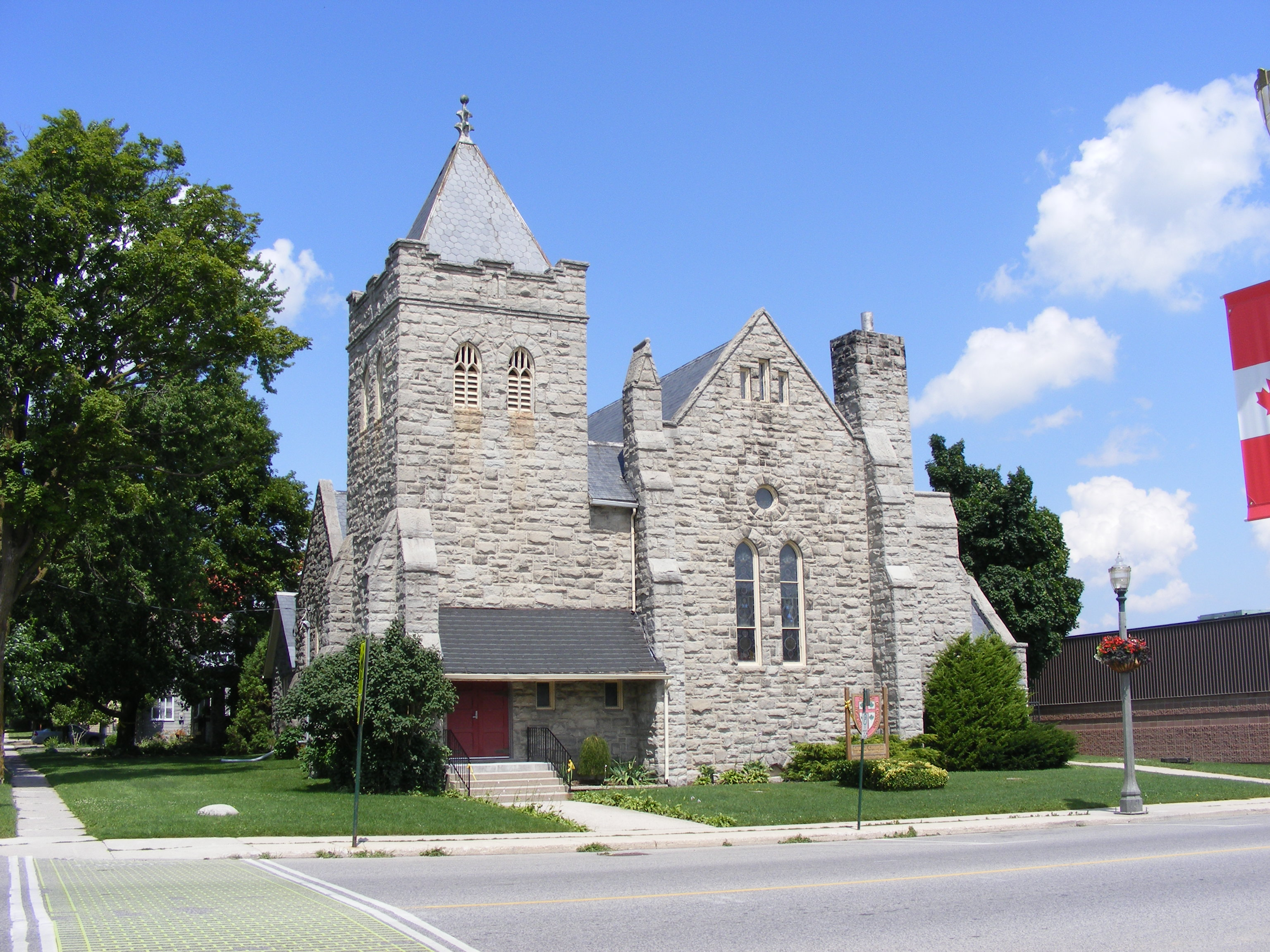
Christ Church (Anglican)

- Calvin Bricker, Track and field athlete
- Al Coates, NHL team executive, two-time Stanley Cup champion with the Calgary Flames and Anaheim Ducks
- Corey Conners, PGA pro golfer
- Emily Coutts, actress
- Gregg Dechert, musician
- Beverley Elliott, actress
- George Hay, NHL ice hockey player and World War I veteran
- Jared Keeso, Gemini Award-winning actor
- Walter Knox, Track and field athlete
- Pegi Nicol MacLeod, painter
- Paul McIntosh, ice hockey player
- Andrew Edward McKeever, World War I flying ace
- Roland McKeown, ice hockey player
- John G. Smale, President, CEO and Chairman of Procter & Gamble; Chairman of General Motors
- Cyclone Taylor, Hall of Fame ice hockey player, two-time Stanley Cup champion
- Paul Thompson, playwright and theatre director
- Brian Vollmer, musician
- Ann Voskamp, author, winner of the Award of Merit in Christianity Today's Books of the Year, 2012
- Horatio Walker, painter

== See also ==
- Listowel, County Kerry, Ireland
- List of population centres in Ontario
