= North Perth, Ontario =

North Perth
- Municipality (lower-tier)
- Municipality of North Perth
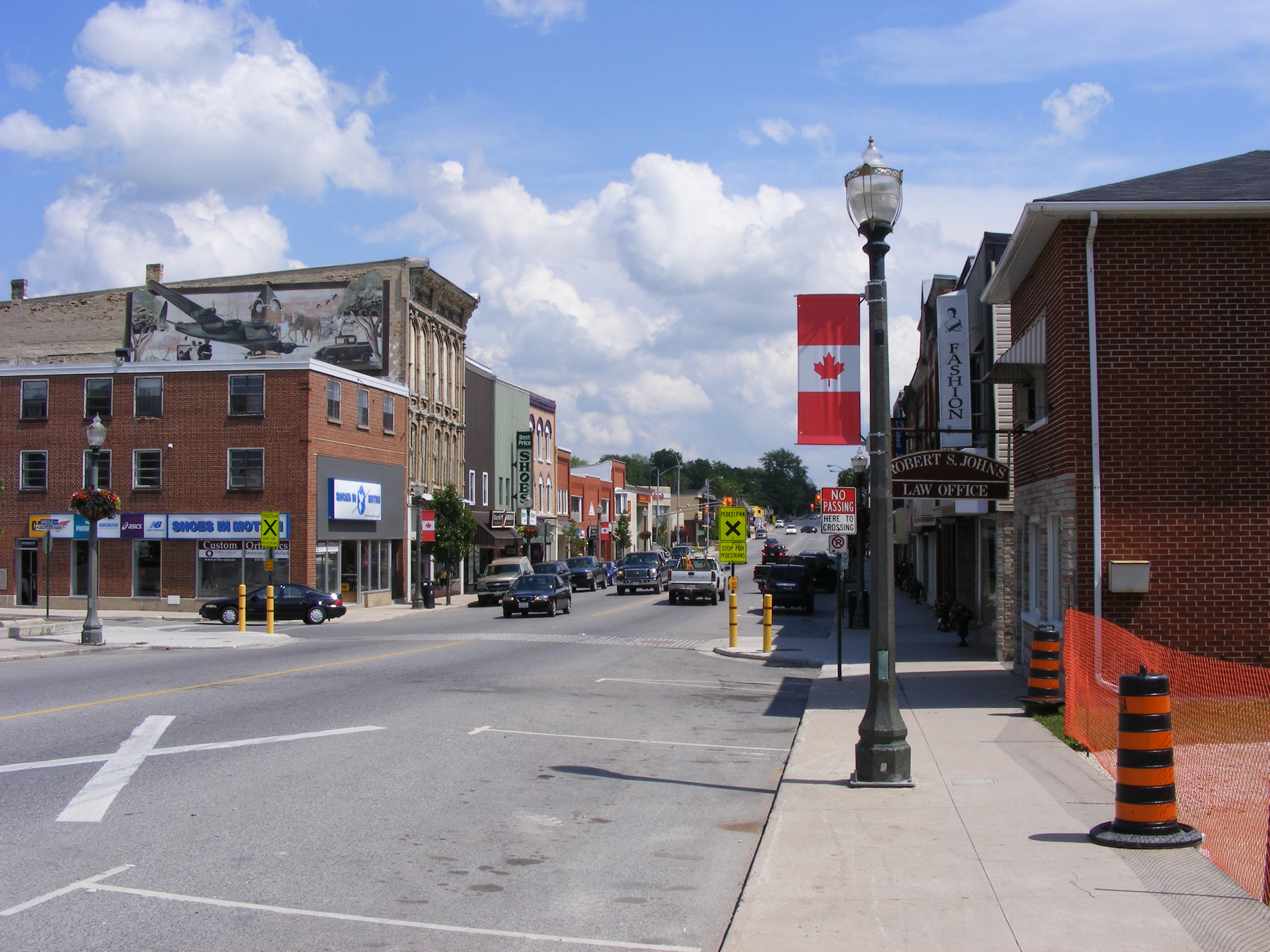
- Listowel Main Street

- Location within Perth County Location within Southern Ontario
- Coordinates: 43°44′N 80°57′W
- Country: Canada
- Province: Ontario
- County: Perth
- Formed: January 1, 1998

Government
  - Mayor: Todd Kasenberg
  - Federal riding: Perth Wellington
  - Prov. riding: Perth—Wellington

Area
  - Land: 493.14 km^{2} (190.40 sq mi)

Population (2016)
  - Total: 13,130
  - Density: 26.6/km^{2} (69/sq mi)
- Time zone: UTC-5 (EST)
  - Summer (DST): UTC-4 (EDT)
- Postal Code: N4W
- Area codes: 519 and 226
- Website: www.northperth.ca

North Perth is a lower-tier municipality in Ontario, Canada. Its name is based on its location in the northern portion of Perth County. The main community in North Perth is the former town of Listowel. Other communities include the former towns of Atwood and Monkton, and the former townships of Elma and Wallace. The municipality was incorporated in 1998 and is heavily agricultural.

As of the 2016 Census, the township had a population of 13,130 in a land area of 493.14 square kilometres. There were 5,098 occupied private dwellings.

== History ==
=== Town of Listowel ===
Settler John Binning arrived in 1852 and was the first to create a permanent residence in the area originally named Mapleton. The name was changed to Listowel when a post office was established in 1856. The new name was chosen by a government official and refers to Listowel, Ireland. The majority of early settlers were of Protestant Irish origin (Ulster Scots Planters, or English Planters).

Listowel was incorporated as a town in 1874. It is located at the intersection of Highway 86 and Highway 23. Its population was 7,530 at the Canada 2016 Census in a land area of 6.65 square kilometres; at the time there were 3,159 occupied dwellings.

=== Township of Elma ===
The Township of Elma was incorporated in 1857. It was named after Lady Elma Bruce, the daughter of Canada's newly arrived Governor General James Bruce better known as Lord Elgin. The earliest recorded settler in the area was John Grant in 1853.

=== Township of Wallace ===
Wallace was incorporated in 1858 and included the villages of Gowanstown and Kurtzville. It lies along the northern boundary of the current Municipality of Perth North and is bordered by Perth Lines 86 and 93, and Perth Road 140.

=== Municipal Restructuring ===
As part of provincial initiatives in the late 1990s, the Government of Ontario pursued a policy of municipal amalgamations. On June 26, 1997, an order from the Ontario Minister of Municipal Affairs for the amalgamation of Wallace Township, Elma Township and the Town of Listowel into the Town of North Perth received Royal assent. The amalgamation came into effect on January 1, 1998.

Ontario Provincial Police currently provides law enforcement services in the community through its North Perth Detachment in Listowel.

== Geography ==
=== Communities ===
The township comprises the communities of Atwood, Britton, Donegal, Gowanstown, Kurtzville, Listowel, Monkton, Newry, Teviotdale, Trowbridge and Wallace.

== Demographics ==
Historical population
Year	Pop.	±%
1996	11,808	—
2001	12,055	+2.1%
2006	12,254	+1.7%
2011	12,631	+3.1%
2016	13,130	+4.0%
Source: Canada 1996 Census, Canada 2001 Census Canada 2016 Census 2006 Census of Canada 2011 Census of Canada

In the 2021 Census of Population conducted by Statistics Canada, North Perth had a population of 15,538 living in 5,959 of its 6,171 total private dwellings, a change of 18.3% from its 2016 population of 13,130. With a land area of 493.09 km^{2} (190.38 sq mi), it had a population density of 31.5/km^{2} (81.6/sq mi) in 2021.

Children aged 9 and under account for approximately 13.4% of the population, while the percentage at retirement age (65 and over) is approximately 16.5%. The median age is 38.9 years of age.

According to the 2011 National Household Survey, 6.9% of the population have immigrant status. The most common countries immigrants come from are the Netherlands (30%) followed by the United Kingdom (12%) and Mexico (11%).

The 2011 survey also indicates that the largest economic sectors by number of workers employed are manufacturing (1,190 workers); retail trade (1,005 workers); agriculture, forestry, fishing and hunting (890 workers); health care and social assistance (715 workers) and construction (500 workers). Other industries in the region employing more than 200 workers are finance and insurance; professional, scientific and technical services; educational services; and transportation and warehousing. The average income reported in the 2011 National Household Survey was $37,155 with an average after-tax income of $32,131.

According to the 2011 National Household Survey, the majority of residents of North Perth are members of a Christian faith and account for 78.2% of the population. Less than 1% of the population is Muslim, and the remaining population reported no religious affiliation. Of the Christian population, the largest religious affiliation is Presbyterian (21.2%) followed by United Church (21.1%), Roman Catholic (12.5%), Lutheran (8,7%), Anglican (3.5%), Pentecostal (1.8%), Baptist (1.4%) and other Christian (29.5%).

== Education ==
North Perth is served by the Avon Maitland District School Board or the Huron-Perth Catholic District School Board.

== Services ==
Policing is done by the Ontario Provincial Police, Perth County Detachment, based in Sebringville, Ontario with a satellite station in Listowel. The North Perth Fire Department is a volunteer service operating from three stations; Monkton, Atwood and Listowel. Emergency Medical and ambulance services are provided by Perth County EMS. Public Libraries are located in Listowel, Atwood and Monkton.

Medical facilities include Listowel Memorial Hospital and the Fisher Family Primary Care Centre with family physicians' offices.

== Economy ==
North Perth is home to over 300 businesses across a variety of business and service sectors. The Municipality is served by the Perth County Economic Development Office, Stratford/Perth Centre for Business, and Listowel Retail Merchants Association. These organizations work in tandem to identify opportunities for local economic growth and to provide resources and support for local business.

North Perth includes companies such as Trillium Mutual (head office), Listowel Technologies, Erie Meats, Spinrite Yarns and large national retailers. The area's 57-acre business park is working to attract new industries from across the region.

The Campbell's, in Listowel, was a major local employer for 48 years, operating a frozen, foodservice and specialty food plant. This relationship ended abruptly with the announcement of the factory's pending closure on April 28, 2008. In 2010 the former plant was purchased by Erie Meat Products and expected to ship 50-60 million pounds of poultry to world markets on an annual basis.

Since 1996 North Perth has attracted new industries, including Listowel Technology, Inc. a manufacturer of injection-moulded automotive parts with a 240,000-square-foot facility employing 500. In 2012, EFS Plastics constructed a 40,000 square foot plant in the North Perth Industrial Park. Other businesses in the park include Vision Manufacturing Solutions, Hutchison Precision Inc., Shredall and Energrow. HLA/Horst Welding was planning to complete a new 64,000 square foot metal fabrication facility in 2016.

In addition to Listowel Technology and the Listowel Memorial Hospital, other major employers, and the number of employees, include the following according to County records:

- Spinrite Inc. 375
- Erie Meat Products Ltd. 250
- Ideal Supply Company Ltd. 175
- L.H. Gray & Sons 85
- Benshaw Canada Controls 52
- B.T.E. Assembly 50

== Government ==
=== Local Government ===
The Municipality of North Perth is governed by a Municipal Council composed of ten members including a Mayor, Deputy Mayor, and eight Councillors. The Councillors represent Elma, Listowel and Wallace.

The mayor for the 2022-2026 term is Todd Kasenberg. Kasenberg was a newcomer to local politics when he was elected in the fall of 2018. He owns a marketing consulting company and is a member of the Atwood Lions Club and the Linguists of Listowel Toastmaster Club.

The Municipality's operations are overseen by the Chief Administrator's Office and include building & planning, Clerk's Office, Finance, Fire, Parks and Recreation, and Public Works.

==== Township Council 2022-2026 ====
Sources:
