= Noel Duignan =

Canadian politician

Member of the Ontario Provincial Parliament for Halton North
- In office 1990–1995
- Preceded by: Walt Elliot
- Succeeded by: Ted Chudleigh

Personal details
- Born: December 20, 1948 (age 77) Dublin, Ireland
- Party: New Democrat
- Occupation: Mediator, executive assistant

Noel Duignan (born December 20, 1948) is former politician in Ontario, Canada. He was a New Democratic Party member of the Legislative Assembly of Ontario from 1990 to 1995.

== Background ==
Before running for office, Duignan was an executive assistant to federal New Democratic Party MPs Derek Blackburn and Lyle Kristiansen. He is a recipient of the Canada Medal.

== Politics ==
Duignan was elected to the Ontario legislature in the 1990 provincial election, defeating incumbent Liberal Walt Elliot by 548 votes in the riding of Halton North. The NDP won a majority government and Duignan served as a parliamentary assistant to the Minister of Consumer and Commercial Relations from 1993 to 1995.

In 1994, Duignan sponsored a private member's bill that banned landfills on the Niagara Escarpment. He said, "The Niagara Escarpment is simply the wrong place to put a landfill."

In the 1995 provincial election Duignan was defeated finishing third against Progressive Conservative candidate Ted Chudleigh. He ran for re-election in the 1999 provincial election in the riding of Dufferin—Peel—Wellington—Grey, but finished third against Progressive Conservative incumbent David Tilson. He was also a candidate of the federal NDP in the 2004 Canadian election, but finished third against Conservative Michael Chong in the riding of Wellington—Halton Hills.

== Later life ==
Duignan trained in mediation with J.P. Ryan and Associates and the Law Society of Upper Canada and is a member of mediate.ca. He works as a housing consultant and is a director of Brant Alcove Rehabilitation Services, a drug and alcohol rehabilitation centre based in Brantford, Ontario. Duignan is also a member of Family Mediation Canada, the Ontario Association for Family Mediation, Conflict Resolution Network Canada, and the Co-Operative Housing Federation of Canada. He lives in Georgetown, Ontario.

== Electoral record ==
2004 Canadian federal election: Wellington—Halton Hills
| Party | Candidate | Votes | % | ±% | Expenditures |
|---|---|---|---|---|---|
| Conservative | Michael Chong | 21,479 | 42.81 | – | $64,026 |
| Liberal | Bruce Hood | 19,173 | 38.21 | – | $73,831 |
| New Democratic | Noel Duignan | 5,974 | 11.91 | – | $13,594 |
| Green | Brent Bouteiller | 2,725 | 5.43 | – | $799 |
| Christian Heritage | Pat Woode | 826 | 1.65 | – | $2,304 |
| Total valid votes | | 50,177 | 100.00 | $75,799 | |
| Total rejected ballots | | 205 | 0.16 | – | |
| Turnout | | 50,382 | 67.03 | – | |
| Eligible voters | | 75,160 | – | – | |

1999 Ontario general election: Dufferin—Peel—Wellington—Grey
| Party | Candidate | Votes | % | ±% |
|---|---|---|---|---|
| Progressive Conservative | David Tilson | 30,532 | 64.76 | – |
| Liberal | Steve White | 13,591 | 28.83 | – |
| New Democratic | Noel Duignan | 1,871 | 3.97 | – |
| Green | Richard Procter | 1,156 | 2.45 | – |
| Total valid votes | | 47,150 | 99.28 | |
| Total rejected, unmarked and declined ballots | | 342 | 0.72 | – |
| Turnout | | 47,492 | 58.62 | – |
| Eligible voters | | 81,020 | | |
| Progressive Conservative notional hold | | Swing | | – |
Source: Elections Ontario

1995 Ontario general election: Halton North
| Party | Candidate | Votes | % |
|---|---|---|---|
| Progressive Conservative | Ted Chudleigh | 19,247 | 60.38 |
| Liberal | Walt Elliot | 6,568 | 20.60 |
| New Democratic | Noel Duignan | 4,362 | 13.68 |
| Family Coalition | Alex McKee | 1,239 | 3.89 |
| Libertarian | John Shadbolt | 461 | 1.45 |
| Total valid votes | | 31,877 | |

1990 Ontario general election: Halton North
| Party | Candidate | Votes | % |
|---|---|---|---|
| New Democratic | Noel Duignan | 8,510 | 30.9 |
| Liberal | Walt Elliot | 7,962 | 29.0 |
| Progressive Conservative | Dave Whiting | 7,499 | 27.3 |
| Family Coalition | Giuseppe Gori | 2,489 | 9.1 |
| Green | Patricia Kammerer | 582 | 2.1 |
| Libertarian | John Shadbolt | 461 | 1.7 |
| Total valid votes | | 29,586 | |
