= Michael Chong =

Canadian politician (born 1971)

The Honourable Michael Chong PC MP
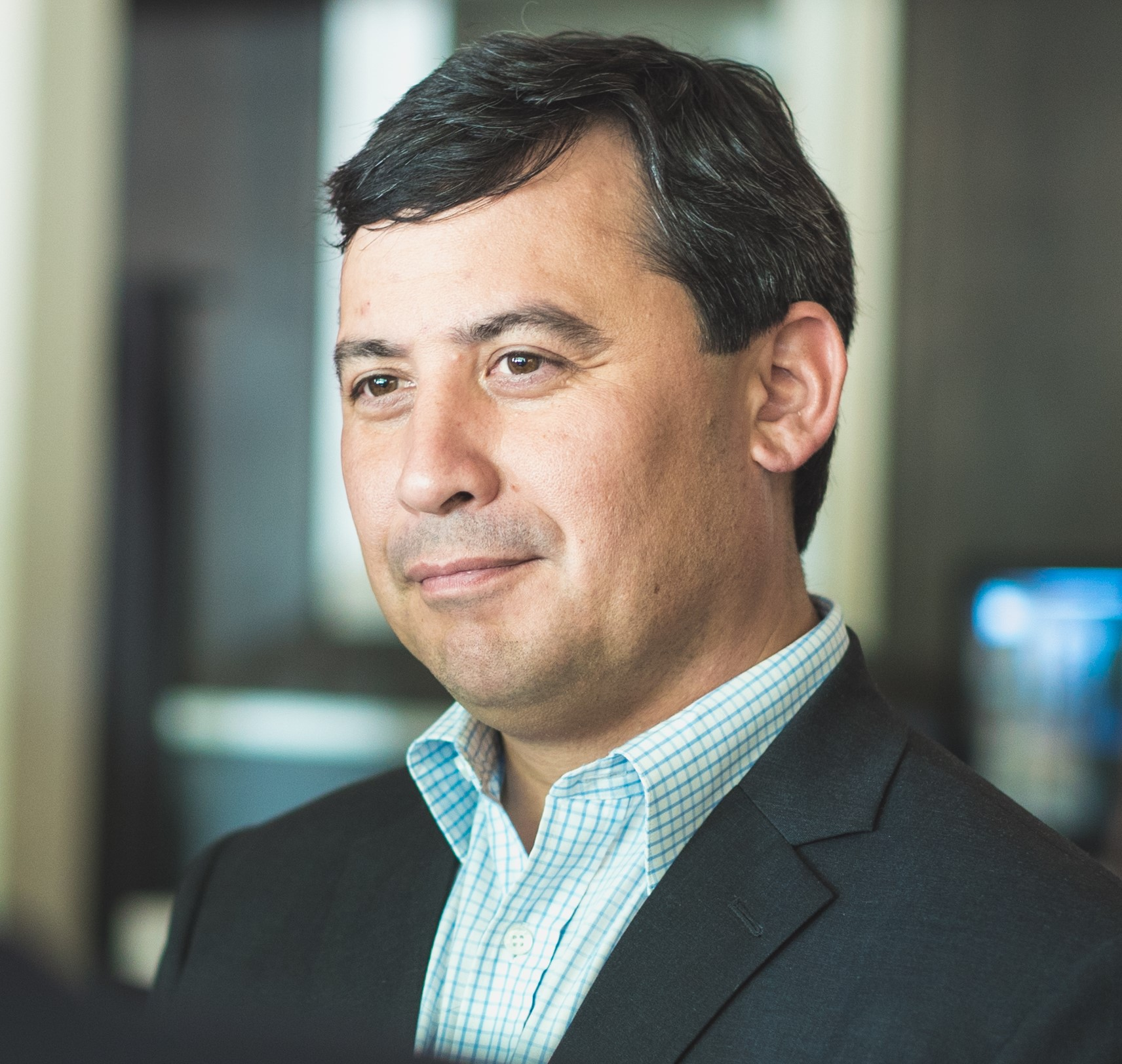
- Chong in 2017

President of the Queen's Privy Council
- In office February 6, 2006 – November 26, 2006
- Prime Minister: Stephen Harper
- Preceded by: Lucienne Robillard
- Succeeded by: Peter Van Loan

Minister of Intergovernmental Affairs
- In office February 6, 2006 – November 26, 2006
- Prime Minister: Stephen Harper
- Preceded by: Lucienne Robillard
- Succeeded by: Peter Van Loan

Minister of State for Sport
- In office February 6, 2006 – November 26, 2006
- Prime Minister: Stephen Harper
- Preceded by: Stephen Owen
- Succeeded by: Peter Van Loan

Member of Parliament for Wellington—Halton Hills North Wellington—Halton Hills (2004–2025)
- Incumbent
- Assumed office June 28, 2004
- Preceded by: Constituency established
Shadow Minister
| 2026–present | Finance |
| 2020–2026 | Foreign Affairs |
| 2019–2020 | Democratic Institutions |
| 2018–2019 | Science |
| 2017–2018 | Infrastructure, Communities and Urban Affairs |

Personal details
- Born: Michael David Chong; November 22, 1971 (age 54) Windsor, Ontario, Canada
- Party: Conservative (2003–present)
- Other political affiliations: Progressive Conservative (before 2003)
- Spouse: Carrie Davidson
- Children: 3
- Education: Trinity College, Toronto (BA)
- Profession: IT consultant
- Website: michaelchong.ca

Chinese name
- Traditional Chinese: 莊文浩
- Simplified Chinese: 庄文浩
Transcriptions
Yue: Cantonese
- Yale Romanization: Jōng Màhn-houh
- Jyutping: Zong^{1} Man^{4} Hou^{6}

Michael David Chong PC MP (born November 22, 1971) is a Canadian politician who has represented the Ontario riding of Wellington—Halton Hills North (Note: Known as Wellington—Halton Hills until 2025.) in the House of Commons since 2004. A member of the Conservative Party, he served in the cabinet of Prime Minister Stephen Harper as Minister of Intergovernmental Affairs and Minister of Sport, as well as the President of the Queen's Privy Council for Canada from February to November 2006.

On September 8, 2020, Chong was appointed the Shadow Minister for Foreign Affairs, serving in the shadow cabinets of Erin O'Toole and Pierre Poilievre. He previously served as Shadow Minister for Infrastructure, Communities and Urban Affairs, Shadow Cabinet Minister for Science, and Shadow Cabinet Minister for Democratic Institutions under Andrew Scheer.

Chong began his career on Bay Street before entering politics. He ran for the leadership of the Conservative Party in 2017, coming in fifth place out of fourteen candidates. On June 30, 2026, he was appointed Shadow Minister for Finance.

== Early life, education, and career ==
Chong was born on November 22, 1971, in Windsor, Ontario, the oldest son of Cornelia de Haan and Paul Chong. His father was born in Hong Kong and immigrated to Canada in 1952, becoming a doctor. His mother arrived in Canada in 1960 from the Netherlands, and worked as a nurse. Chong has three siblings; Peter, Andrew and Joanna. He was raised near Fergus in Wellington County, a small town in rural Southern Ontario, and attended Centre Wellington District High School. In 1978, when Chong was six years old, his mother was killed in a car accident at an intersection near Fergus. Two years after her death his father married Adriana, who raised him and his three siblings as if they were her own. In 1999, Chong's father was also killed in a car accident at the same intersection where his mother had been killed 21 years earlier.

Chong attended Trinity College at the University of Toronto where he studied philosophy, history and politics. In his final year at university he landed a job with Canadian Tire as an assistant to a senior executive.

He has worked in information technology for Barclays Bank and Research Capital Corporation. Chong worked as a senior technology consultant to the Greater Toronto Airports Authority for the redevelopment of Pearson International Airport and prior to entering politics he worked for the National Hockey League Players’ Association.

Chong was a founding member of The Dominion Institute. He served on the board of the Groves Memorial Hospital from 2002 to 2004, later serving on the board of the Elora Festival and Elora Festival Singers as well as the Corporation of Trinity College.

== Political career ==
Chong joined the Progressive Conservative Party of Canada and the Progressive Conservative Party of Ontario in the late 1980s. He ran for parliament in the 2000 federal election as a Progressive Conservative, and finished third Waterloo—Wellington against incumbent Liberal Member of Parliament (MP) Lynn Myers. Chong supported Peter MacKay for the leadership of the federal PC party in 2003.

=== Backbencher (2004–2006) ===
==== 38th Parliament ====
In early 2004, the Progressive Conservatives merged with the Canadian Alliance to create the Conservative Party of Canada. Chong joined the new party, and in March 2004 defeated Marty Burke to win its nomination for Wellington—Halton Hills. He was elected in the 2004 federal election, defeating Liberal Bruce Hood by over 2,000 votes.

Chong declared his personal support for the Kyoto Protocol during the 2004 federal election, despite his party's opposition to the measure. He supported Elizabeth Witmer's bid to lead the Progressive Conservative Party of Ontario in 2001–02, and supported John Tory for the same position in 2004.

Chong wrote an opinion editorial for The Globe and Mail newspaper in late 2004 entitled "Canadians without hyphens", criticizing John Barber's suggestion that there were not enough Chinese-Canadian MPs representing areas with large Chinese populations. Chong noted he was elected in a riding with a 97% Caucasian population, while John McCallum was elected in Markham—Unionville, which is more than 60% Asian. Chong argued that these results reflected his idea of Canada, adding that he favoured the creation of a "common Canadian identity that will allow for greater understanding among ethnic groups".

Like most Conservative MPs, Chong voted against the legal recognition of same-sex marriage in Canada in 2005. A majority of MPs from other parties supported the measure, however, and same-sex marriages were granted legal recognition. In December 2006, Chong reversed his previous position and became one of thirteen Conservative MPs to vote against re-opening the marriage debate.

Chong has opposed using the Great Lakes as a water source for inland communities. He has expressed concern about depopulation in rural Ontario, and supports continued door-to-door rural mail service programs.

=== Cabinet minister (2006) ===
==== 39th Parliament: Minister of Intergovernmental Affairs and Sport ====
Chong was re-elected in the 2006 federal election. In February 2006, he was appointed to the cabinet in Stephen Harper's government as Minister of Intergovernmental Affairs, President of the Queen's Privy Council for Canada, and Minister of Sport. He was the second Chinese-Canadian cabinet minister in Canadian history, after Raymond Chan.

In the buildup to the 2006 federal budget, Chong met with various provincial representatives to discuss ways of approaching Canada's equalization formula between the federal government and the provinces. Prior to the budget's release, he described the existing system as "a mess". Some politicians in Ontario expressed concern that the deal would be unduly favourable to Quebec and unfavourable to their province. Later in the year, Harper government indicated that it would automatically transfer future surpluses to the provinces.

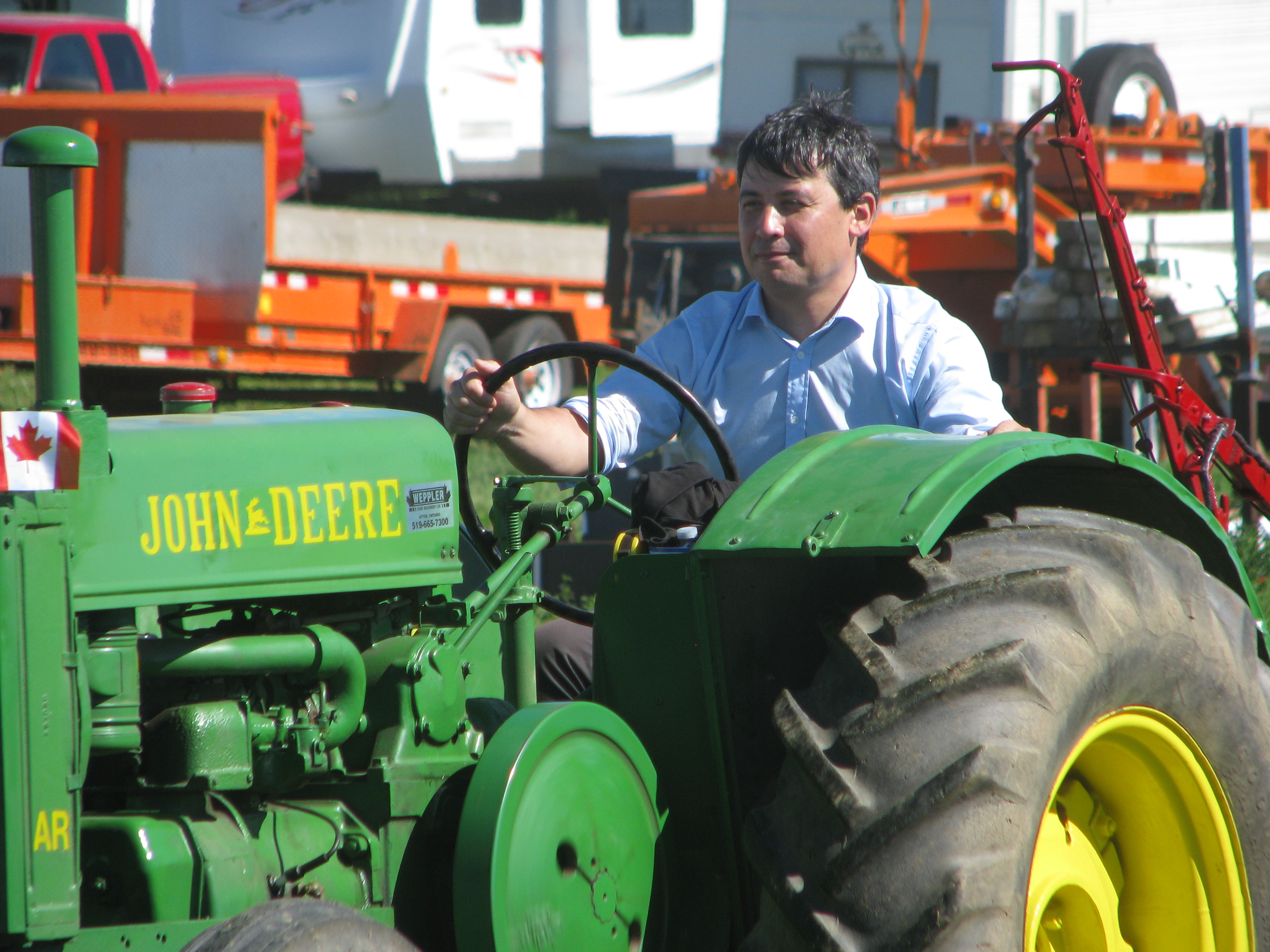
Chong operating a tractor

In September 2006, the Canadian media reported that the Harper government was considering a plan to transfer $3 billion to the provinces each year. Every province except Newfoundland and Labrador would gain revenue, with Quebec gaining the most at $1.1 billion.

In early 2006, Chong said that his government would fulfill an election pledge to devote 1% of federal health spending (about $350 million) to health promotion and amateur sports. He represented the Harper government as a representative at the 2006 Commonwealth Games in Melbourne, Australia. This funding did not appear in the 2006 budget, although the Harper government introduced an annual sports tax credit of $80 per child.

In June 2006, Chong indicated that the federal government would not provide federal funding to the "Out Games", a gay-and-lesbian themed athletic competition held in Montreal, Quebec. The following month, Chong provided $395,000 to Canada's Sports Hall of Fame, to make its collection accessible online. He has also discussed the possibility of restarting Canada's ParticipACTION program, which encourages ordinary citizens to become more involved in sports and athletic events. The program was restarted in February 2007, after Chong resigned from cabinet.

Chong pledged $3.5 million to the 2008 North American Indigenous Games in early November 2006. Later in the same month, he announced the creation of Podium Canada to consolidate Canada's medal strategies for the Summer and Winter Olympics.

Chong unexpectedly resigned from cabinet on November 27, 2006, to express his opposition to a motion before the House of Commons, put forward by Prime Minister Harper, which recognized "the Québécois as a nation within a united Canada". Chong said that the motion was akin to ethnic nationalism, which he opposes. During the press conference he held to announce his decision, he said "I believe in one nation, undivided, called Canada".

=== Return to the backbenches (2006–2015) ===
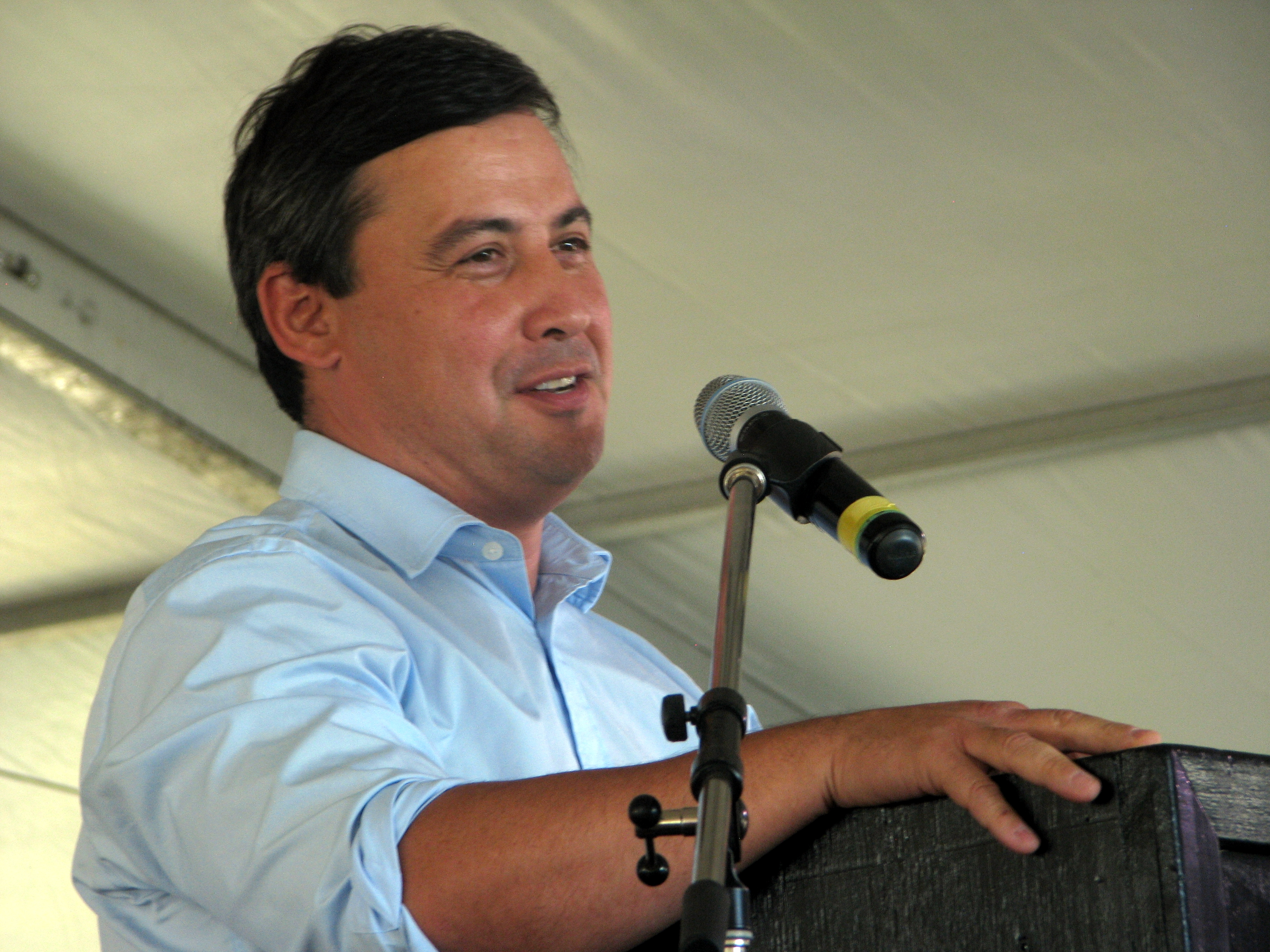
Chong speaking in September 2016

==== 41st Parliament: Reform Act ====
As a backbench MP, Chong proposed the Reform Act (An Act to amend the Canada Elections Act and the Parliament of Canada Act (candidacy and caucus reforms)) in order to increase the power of party caucuses. The Act ultimately passed the House of Commons and Senate, with amendments, and was given royal assent in 2015. Under the act, each caucus votes at the beginning of each parliament on whether or not it will adopt the Act's procedures giving the caucus the power to review and, if it wishes, remove the party leader, for the election and review of the caucus chair, the expulsion and re-admission of caucus members, and the election of the interim leader.

=== In Opposition, shadow minister (2015–present) ===
==== 42nd Parliament: 2017 leadership election ====
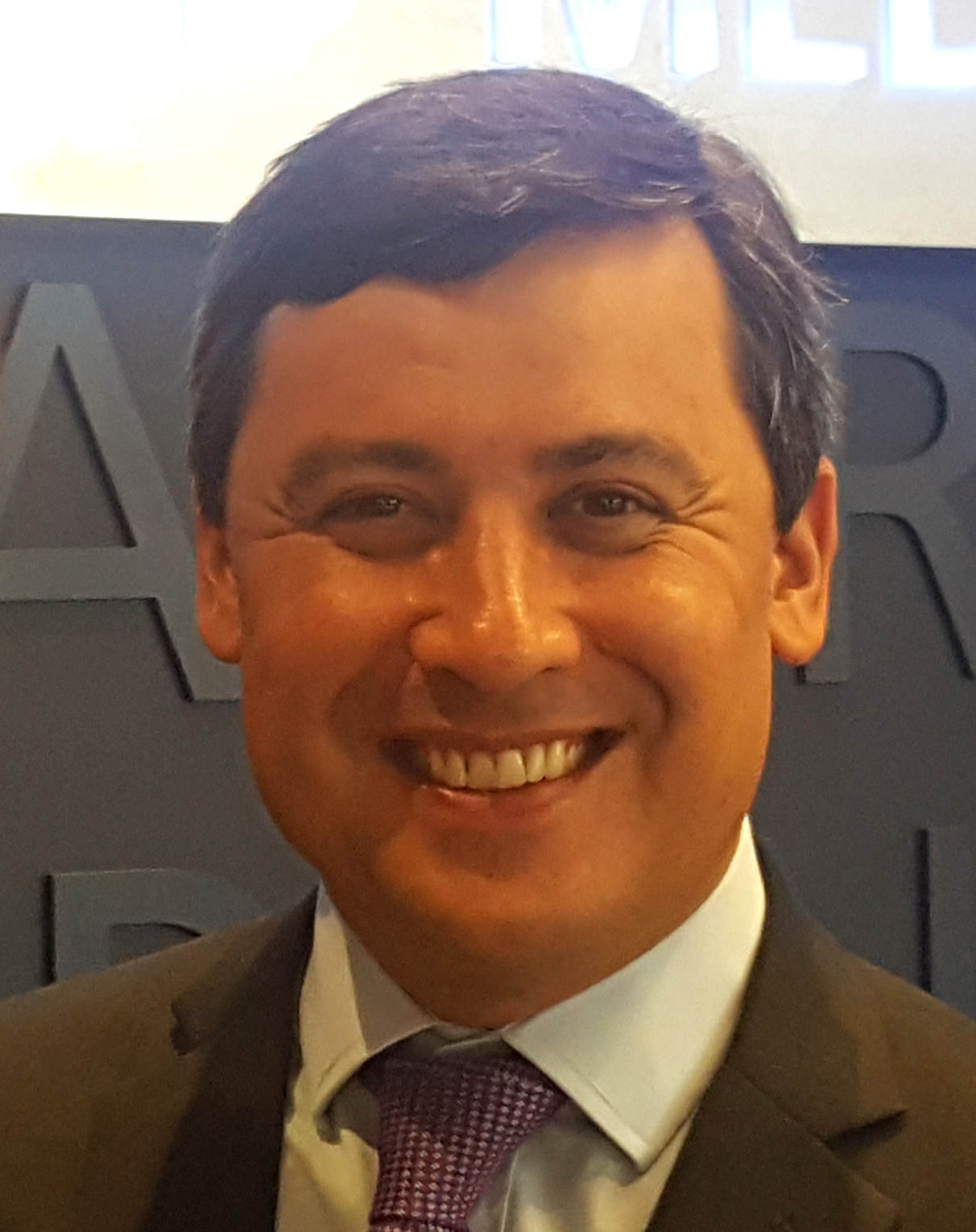
Chong in Vancouver

The Conservative Party was defeated in the 2015 federal election, and Harper immediately resigned as party leader. Despite not having served in Harper's cabinet for nine years, Chong's name was among those mentioned in the media as a potential candidate for party leader. When asked about a leadership bid in November 2015, Chong responded "let's wait and see." In early 2016, the Conservative Party announced that the leadership election would be held on May 27, 2017. On May 16, 2016, Chong launched his campaign at the National Press Theatre in Ottawa, becoming the third candidate to enter the race.

Chong's leadership bid was endorsed by MP and former Environment Minister Peter Kent, as well as MP David Tilson. Chong also received the support of Member of Provincial Parliament (MPP) Ted Arnott and former MPs Chungsen Leung and Mike Wallace.

Chong is in favour of implementing what he describes as a revenue-neutral carbon tax.

Chong stated publicly that he supports Motion 103, which calls on the government to condemn Islamophobia in Canada and all other forms of religious and racial discrimination. Chong was one of two Conservative MPs, the other being Simcoe North MP Bruce Stanton, and the only leadership candidate to vote for the motion.

Ultimately Andrew Scheer was elected party leader on May 27, 2017. Chong subsequently served in Scheer's shadow cabinet, being named Shadow Minister for Infrastructure, Communities and Urban Affairs the following summer, later being appointed Shadow Cabinet Minister for Science in 2018.

==== 43rd–45th Parliaments: Shadow Foreign Minister (2020–present) ====
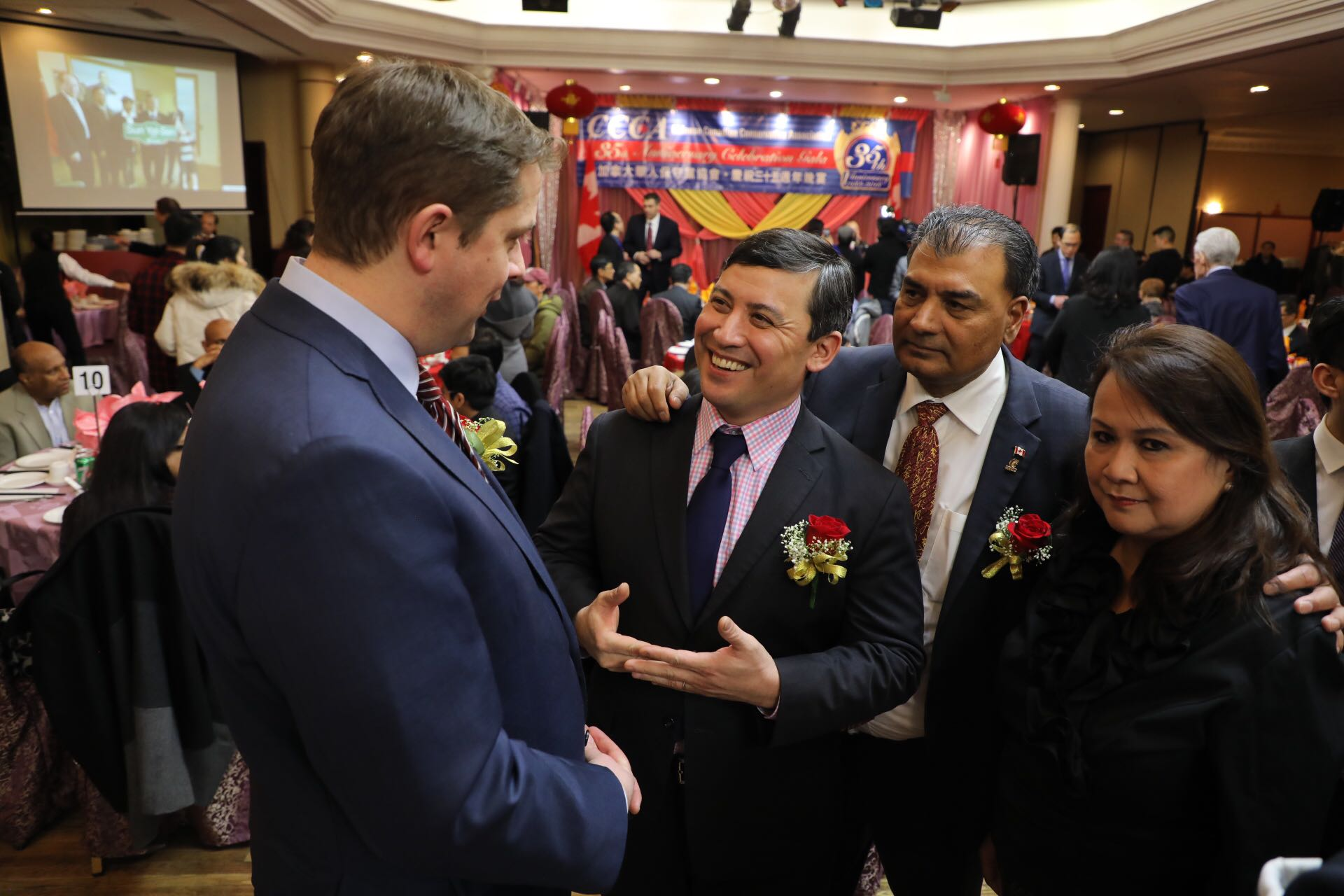
Chong with Andrew Scheer at the 35th anniversary celebration of the Chinese Canadian Conservative Association in 2018

After about a year as Shadow Science Minister, Andrew Scheer made Chong his Shadow Cabinet Minister for Democratic Institutions in 2019, after the Conservatives were unable to reach a majority in the 2019 Federal election.

On August 24, 2020, Erin O'Toole won the leadership election to replace Scheer, who decided to resign after the 2019 election. On September 8, 2020, Chong was appointed the Shadow Minister for Foreign Affairs by O'Toole.

On February 22, 2021, Chong lead a successful opposition motion in the House of Commons to recognize the human rights abuses against Uyghurs in the Xinjiang region of China as genocide. Chong also served as the vice chair of the Parliament’s Standing Committee on Foreign Affairs and International Development (FAAE), whose Subcommittee on International Human Rights presented a report in March 2021 that concluded that crimes against humanity and genocide had taken place in Xinjiang. That month, Canada imposed sanctions on individuals and entities in connection with what Prime Minister Justin Trudeau called "gross and systemic human rights violations in the Xinjiang region". In response, the government of the People's Republic of China deployed countermeasures, which included imposing sanctions on Chong and the FAAE's Subcommittee on International Human Rights. Prime Minister Justin Trudeau and Foreign Affairs Minister Marc Garneau condemned the sanctions.

After the 2022 Russian invasion of Ukraine, Chong was similarly sanctioned by government of the Russian Federation after the Canadian government sanctioned many Russian officials close to Vladimir Putin over the Ukrainian invasion. In a March 2022 op ed, Chong said Canada should seek to "isolate Russia internationally" and called for censorship of RT (Russia Today) from Canadian networks.

In September 2022, newly elected Conservative leader Pierre Poilievre retained Chong as Shadow Minister for Foreign Affairs.

It was reported in May 2023 that Chong's family in Hong Kong was targeted following the Uyghur genocide vote, including by a Chinese diplomat named Zhao Wei. Zhao was later declared persona non grata by Foreign Affairs Minister Mélanie Joly. The Royal Canadian Mounted Police subsequently opened an investigation into efforts to Chinese government election interference efforts in Canada. In August 2023, the Ministry of Foreign Affairs stated that Chong and his family had been the target of an online disinformation operation by the Chinese government. On February 15, 2024, Chong was interviewed by Foreign Interference Commission, established by the Government of Canada as part of a Public Inquiry into Foreign Interference in Federal Electoral Processes and Democratic Institutions. The interview concerned Chong's advocacy efforts regarding the People’s Republic of China, sanctions, the targeting of Chong's family, and the Government of Canada's response.

After the 2025 federal election, party leader Pierre Poilievre lost his seat. He returned to Parliament in May after winning a by-election, keeping Chong as his Shadow Foreign Minister in his second Shadow Cabinet. Additionally, Chong was elected as Vice Chair of the Canadian House of Commons Standing Committee on Foreign Affairs and International Development in the 45th Parliament.

On February 9, 2026, Chong issued a statement on behalf of the Conservative Party calling for the immediate release of Hong Kong newspaper publisher Jimmy Lai, who was convicted and imprisoned in Hong Kong over the 2020 Hong Kong national security law.

== Personal life ==
Chong is married to Carrie Davidson, whom he met while at university. She has roots in both Quebec and Newfoundland and Labrador. Her great-great grandfather was William Whiteway, a pro-Confederation politician and three-time premier of the colony of Newfoundland in the late 19th century. Another great-great grandfather, Charles Peers Davidson, was chief justice of the Superior Court of Quebec in the early 1910s. The couple live near Fergus, which is located on the Grand River about 85 kilometres from Toronto, and have three sons; William, Alistair, and Cameron.

Chong is a practicing Christian. At the time of the 2025 Canadian federal election, he lived in Elora, Ontario.

== Electoral record ==
2000 Canadian federal election: Waterloo—Wellington
| Party | Candidate | Votes | % | ±% | Expenditures |
|---|---|---|---|---|---|
| Liberal | Lynn Myers | 19,619 | 43.66 | −0.34 | $64,568.53 |
| Alliance | John Reimer | 14,797 | 32.93 | +1.6 | $47,962.31 |
| Progressive Conservative | Michael Chong | 7,999 | 17.80 | −0.31 | $24,282.50 |
| New Democratic | Allan Douglas Strong | 1,845 | 4.11 | −2.45 | $1,588.58 |
| Green | Brent Bouteiller | 432 | 0.96 | | $206.62 |
| Christian Heritage | Peter Ellis | 249 | 0.55 | | $2,148.45 |
| Total valid votes/expense limit | | 44,941 | 100.00 | | |
| Total rejected ballots | | 156 | 0.28 | – | |
| Turnout | | 45,097 | 58.11 | | |
| Eligible voters | | 77,610 | | | |
| Liberal hold | | Swing | | −0.97 | |

2004 Canadian federal election: Wellington—Halton Hills
| Party | Candidate | Votes | % | ±% | Expenditures |
|---|---|---|---|---|---|
| Conservative | Michael Chong | 21,479 | 42.81 | – | $64,026 |
| Liberal | Bruce Hood | 19,173 | 38.21 | – | $73,831 |
| New Democratic | Noel Duignan | 5,974 | 11.91 | – | $13,594 |
| Green | Brent Bouteiller | 2,725 | 5.43 | – | $799 |
| Christian Heritage | Pat Woode | 826 | 1.65 | – | $2,304 |
| Total valid votes | | 50,177 | 100.00 | $75,799 | |
| Total rejected ballots | | 205 | 0.16 | – | |
| Turnout | | 50,382 | 67.03 | – | |
| Eligible voters | | 75,160 | – | – | |

2006 Canadian federal election: Wellington—Halton Hills
| Party | Candidate | Votes | % | ±% | Expenditures |
|---|---|---|---|---|---|
| Conservative | Michael Chong | 27,907 | 50.75 | +7.95 | $73,993 |
| Liberal | Rod Finnie | 16,065 | 29.22 | −8.99 | $55,605 |
| New Democratic | Noel Duignan | 6,785 | 12.34 | +0.43 | $5,496 |
| Green | Brent Bouteiller | 3,362 | 6.11 | +0.68 | $1,102 |
| Christian Heritage | Carol Ann Krusky | 606 | 1.10 | −0.54 | $4,944 |
| Independent | Mike Wisniewski | 355 | 0.65 | – | $1,174 |
| Total valid votes/expense limit | | 55,080 | 100.00 | – | $78,546 |
| Total rejected ballots | | 162 | 0.29 | +0.13 | |
| Turnout | | 55,242 | 71.05 | +4.02 | |
| Eligible voters | | 77,756 | – | – | |
| Conservative hold | | Swing | | +8.47 | |

2008 Canadian federal election: Wellington—Halton Hills
| Party | Candidate | Votes | % | ±% | Expenditures |
|---|---|---|---|---|---|
| Conservative | Michael Chong | 29,191 | 57.63 | +6.97 | $67,429 |
| Liberal | Bruce Bowser | 11,312 | 22.33 | −6.83 | $71,000 |
| Green | Brent Bouteiller | 4,987 | 9.84 | +3.74 | $1,497 |
| New Democratic | Noel Duignan | 4,747 | 9.37 | −2.94 | $800 |
| Christian Heritage | Jeffrey Streutker | 414 | 0.81 | −0.29 | $416 |
| Total valid votes/Expense limit | | 50,651 | 100.00 | – | $85,603.64 |
| Conservative hold | | Swing | | +6.9 | |
Source: Elections Canada

2011 Canadian federal election: Wellington—Halton Hills
| Party | Candidate | Votes | % | ±% | Expenditures |
|---|---|---|---|---|---|
| Conservative | Michael Chong | 35,132 | 63.70 | +6.07 | – |
| Liberal | Barry Peters | 9,034 | 16.38 | −5.95 | – |
| New Democratic | Anastasia Zavarella | 7,146 | 12.96 | +3.59 | – |
| Green | Brent Bouteiller | 3,527 | 6.37 | −3.47 | 9,592.53 |
| Christian Heritage | Jeffrey Streutker | 316 | 0.57 | −0.24 | – |
| Total valid votes/Expense limit | | 55,155 | 100.00 | – | $89,278.64 |
| Total rejected ballots | | 154 | 0.28 | – | |
| Turnout | | 55,309 | 67.27 | – | |
| Eligible voters | | 82,215 | – | – | |
| Conservative hold | | Swing | | +6.01 | |
Source: Elections Canada

2015 Canadian federal election: Wellington—Halton Hills
| Party | Candidate | Votes | % | ±% | Expenditures |
|---|---|---|---|---|---|
| Conservative | Michael Chong | 32,482 | 50.90 | −12.83 | $114,808.31 |
| Liberal | Don Trant | 23,279 | 36.48 | +20.16 | $82,917.29 |
| New Democratic | Anne Gajerski-Cauley | 5,321 | 8.34 | −4.66 | $11,740.16 |
| Green | Brent Allan Bouteiller | 2,547 | 3.99 | −2.41 | $2,190.90 |
| Canadian Action | Harvey Edward Anstey | 183 | 0.29 | −0.27 | $381.96 |
| Total valid votes/expense limit | | 63,812 | 100.00 | | $230,272.85 |
| Total rejected ballots | | 185 | 0.28 | – | |
| Turnout | | 63,977 | 71.36 | +4.09 | |
| Eligible voters | | 89,653 | | | |
| Conservative hold | | Swing | | −16.5 | |
Source: Elections Canada

2019 Canadian federal election: Wellington—Halton Hills
| Party | Candidate | Votes | % | ±% | Expenditures |
|---|---|---|---|---|---|
| Conservative | Michael Chong | 33,044 | 47.4 | −3.2 | $78,757.50 |
| Liberal | Lesley Barron | 19,777 | 28.4 | −8.18 | $70,168.78 |
| Green | Ralph Martin | 8,851 | 12.7 | 8.61 | none listed |
| New Democratic | Andrew Bascombe | 6,499 | 9.3 | 0.86 | none listed |
| People's | Syl Carle | 1,509 | 2.2 | – | $6,565.51 |
| Total valid votes/expense limit | | 69,680 | 100.0 | | $122,383.64 |
| Total rejected ballots | | 359 | | | |
| Turnout | | 70,039 | 70.8 | | |
| Eligible voters | | 98,901 | | | |
| Conservative hold | | Swing | | +2.49 | |
Source: Elections Canada

2021 Canadian federal election: Wellington—Halton Hills
| Party | Candidate | Votes | % | ±% | Expenditures |
|---|---|---|---|---|---|
| Conservative | Michael Chong | 35,257 | 52.1 | +4.7 | $85,518.39 |
| Liberal | Melanie Lang | 18,384 | 27.2 | −1.2 | $81,741.49 |
| New Democratic | Noor Jahangir | 7,050 | 10.4 | +1.1 | $4,753.21 |
| People's | Syl Carle | 4,359 | 6.4 | +4.2 | $18,769.54 |
| Green | Ran Zhu | 2,606 | 3.9 | −8.8 | none listed |
| Total valid votes/expense limit | | 67,656 | 99.3 | – | $127,586.25 |
| Total rejected ballots | | 448 | 0.7 | | |
| Turnout | | 68,104 | 67.3 | | |
| Eligible voters | | 101,212 | | | |
| Conservative hold | | Swing | | +3.0 | |
Source: Elections Canada

2025 Canadian federal election: Wellington—Halton Hills North
| Party | Candidate | Votes | % | ±% | Expenditures |
|---|---|---|---|---|---|
| Conservative | Michael Chong | 34,476 | 51.16 | +4.38 | |
| Liberal | Sean Carscadden | 29,609 | 43.93 | +13.68 | |
| Green | Liam Stiles | 1,389 | 2.06 | –2.64 | |
| New Democratic | Andrew Bascombe | 1,353 | 2.01 | –9.95 | |
| People's | Syl Carle | 566 | 0.84 | –5.35 | |
| Total valid votes/expense limit | | | | | |
| Total rejected ballots | | | | | |
| Turnout | | 67,393 | 76.91 | | |
| Eligible voters | | 87,623 | | | |
| Conservative notional hold | | Swing | | –4.65 | |
Source: Elections Canada

All electoral information is taken from Elections Canada. Italicized expenditures refer to submitted totals, and are presented when the final reviewed totals are not available.

== Notes ==
28th Canadian Ministry (2006–2015) – Cabinet of Stephen Harper
Cabinet posts (2)
| Predecessor | Office | Successor |
|---|---|---|
| Lucienne Robillard | President of the Queen's Privy Council for Canada; 2006 | Peter Van Loan |
| Lucienne Robillard | Minister of Intergovernmental Affairs; 2006 | Peter Van Loan |
Special Cabinet Responsibilities
| Predecessor | Title | Successor |
| Stephen Owen | Minister for Sport; 2006 | Peter Van Loan |
Parliament of Canada
| Preceded by riding created in 2004 | Member of Parliament for Wellington—Halton Hills; 2004–present | Succeeded by incumbent |
