= Wellington—Halton Hills (federal electoral district) =

Former federal electoral district in Ontario, Canada

Coordinates: 43.633°N 80.166°W

Ontario electoral district
- Wellington—Halton Hills in relation to other southern Ontario electoral districts

Federal electoral district
- Legislature: House of Commons
- District created: 2003
- District abolished: 2023
- First contested: 2004
- Last contested: 2021
- District webpage: profile, map

Demographics
- Population (2011): 115,880
- Electors (2015): 88,674
- Area (km²): 1,584
- Census division(s): Wellington, Halton
- Census subdivision(s): Halton Hills, Centre Wellington, Guelph/Eramosa, Erin, Puslinch

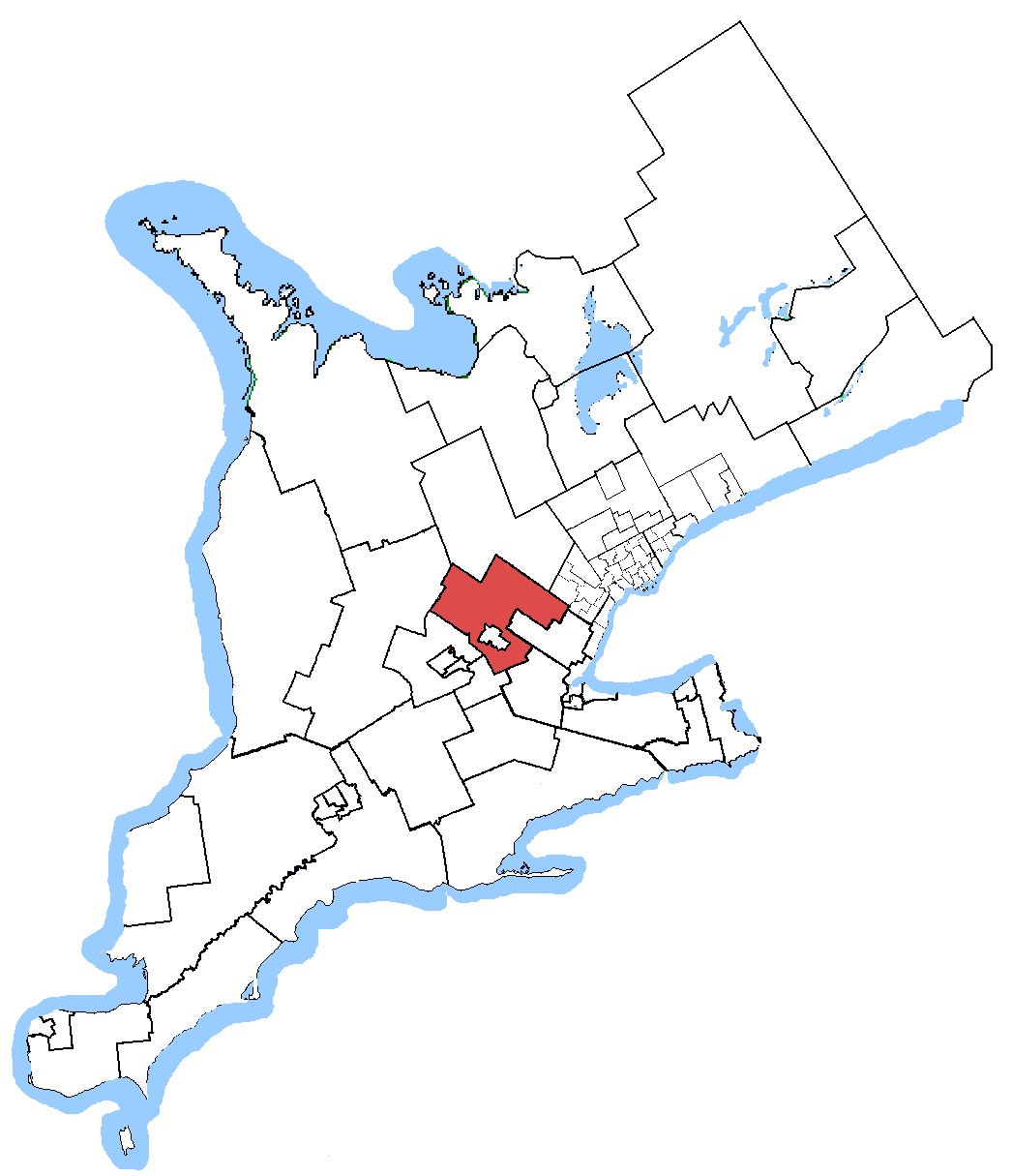
Wellington—Halton Hills in relation to Southern Ontario ridings

Wellington—Halton Hills is a former federal electoral district in Ontario, Canada, that was represented in the House of Commons of Canada from 2004 to 2025.

The Member of Parliament for Wellington—Halton Hills is Michael Chong of the Conservative Party of Canada.

The riding was created in 2003 from parts of Dufferin—Peel—Wellington—Grey, Guelph—Wellington, Halton and Waterloo—Wellington ridings.

It consists of the Town of Halton Hills in the Regional Municipality of Halton and the townships of Centre Wellington, Guelph/Eramosa and Puslinch and the Town of Erin in Wellington County. Although it is counted as part of Midwestern Ontario, it spills into Halton, which is part of the Greater Toronto Area.

This riding lost fractions of territory to Guelph and Kitchener—Conestoga during the 2012 electoral redistribution.

Under the 2022 Canadian federal electoral redistribution the riding was replaced by Milton East—Halton Hills South and Wellington—Halton Hills North.

== Members of Parliament ==
Parliament	Years	Member	Party
Wellington—Halton Hills; Riding created from Dufferin—Peel—Wellington—Grey, Guelph—Wellington, Halton and Waterloo—Wellington
38th	2004–2006	Michael Chong	Conservative
39th	2006–2008	Michael Chong	Conservative
40th	2008–2011	Michael Chong	Conservative
41st	2011–2015	Michael Chong	Conservative
42nd	2015–2019	Michael Chong	Conservative
43rd	2019–2021	Michael Chong	Conservative
44th	2021–2025	Michael Chong	Conservative
Riding dissolved into Milton East—Halton Hills South and Wellington—Halton Hills North

== Demographics ==
Canada census – Wellington—Halton Hills community profile

	2021	2016	2011
Population	127,873 (5.7% from 2016)	120,981 (4.4% from 2011)	115,880 (4.2% from 2006)
Land area	1,492.58 km^{2} (576.29 sq mi)	1,487.86 km^{2} (574.47 sq mi)	1,487.91 km^{2} (574.49 sq mi)
Population density	85.7/km^{2} (222/sq mi)	81.3/km^{2} (211/sq mi)	77.9/km^{2} (202/sq mi)
Median age	43.6 (M: 42.8, F: 44.8)	43.4 (M: 42.6, F: 44.1)	41.6 (M: 41.1, F: 42.1)
Private dwellings	47,288 (total)	44,629 (total)	42,169 (total)
Median household income	$147,400	$100,564

References: 2021 2016 2011

According to the 2021 Canadian census

Ethnic groups: 86.8% White, 4.4% South Asian, 2.6% Indigenous, 1.5% Black

Languages: 84.6% English, 1.2% French, 1.2% Polish, 1.1% Punjabi, 1.1% Portuguese

Religions: 59.6% Christian (27.9% Catholic, 6.2% United Church, 5.4% Anglican, 3.3% Presbyterian, 1.2% Christian Orthodox, 1.1% Baptist, 1.1% Reformed, 13.4% Other), 1.6% Sikh, 1.5% Muslim, 1.1% Hindu, 35.3% None

== Election results ==
Graph of election results in Wellington—Halton Hills (minor parties that never got 2% of the vote or didn't run consistently are omitted)

2021 Canadian federal election
Party	Candidate	Votes	%	±%	Expenditures
Conservative	Michael Chong	35,257	52.1	+4.7	$85,518.39
Liberal	Melanie Lang	18,384	27.2	−1.2	$81,741.49
New Democratic	Noor Jahangir	7,050	10.4	+1.1	$4,753.21
People's	Syl Carle	4,359	6.4	+4.2	$18,769.54
Green	Ran Zhu	2,606	3.9	−8.8	none listed
Total valid votes/expense limit		67,656	99.3	–	$127,586.25
Total rejected ballots		448	0.7		
Turnout		68,104	67.3		
Eligible voters		101,212			
Conservative hold		Swing		+3.0	
Source: Elections Canada

2019 Canadian federal election
Party	Candidate	Votes	%	±%	Expenditures
Conservative	Michael Chong	33,044	47.4	−3.2	$78,757.50
Liberal	Lesley Barron	19,777	28.4	−8.18	$70,168.78
Green	Ralph Martin	8,851	12.7	8.61	none listed
New Democratic	Andrew Bascombe	6,499	9.3	0.86	none listed
People's	Syl Carle	1,509	2.2	–	$6,565.51
Total valid votes/expense limit		69,680	100.0		$122,383.64
Total rejected ballots		359			
Turnout		70,039	70.8		
Eligible voters		98,901			
Conservative hold		Swing		+2.49	
Source: Elections Canada

2015 Canadian federal election
Party	Candidate	Votes	%	±%	Expenditures
Conservative	Michael Chong	32,482	50.90	−12.83	$114,808.31
Liberal	Don Trant	23,279	36.48	+20.16	$82,917.29
New Democratic	Anne Gajerski-Cauley	5,321	8.34	−4.66	$11,740.16
Green	Brent Allan Bouteiller	2,547	3.99	−2.41	$2,190.90
Canadian Action	Harvey Edward Anstey	183	0.29	−0.27	$381.96
Total valid votes/expense limit		63,812	100.00		$230,272.85
Total rejected ballots		185	0.28	–	
Turnout		63,977	71.36	+4.09	
Eligible voters		89,653			
Conservative hold		Swing		−16.5	
Source: Elections Canada

2011 federal election redistributed results
Party	Vote	%
Conservative	35,023	63.73
Liberal	8,979	16.34
New Democratic	7,120	12.96
Green	3,518	6.40
Others	315	0.57

2011 Canadian federal election
Party	Candidate	Votes	%	±%	Expenditures
Conservative	Michael Chong	35,132	63.70	+6.07	–
Liberal	Barry Peters	9,034	16.38	-5.95	–
New Democratic	Anastasia Zavarella	7,146	12.96	+3.59	–
Green	Brent Bouteiller	3,527	6.37	-3.47	9,592.53
Christian Heritage	Jeffrey Streutker	316	0.57	-0.24	–
Total valid votes/Expense limit		55,155	100.00		$89,278.64
Total rejected ballots		154	0.28	–	
Turnout		55,309	67.27	–	
Eligible voters		82,215	–	–	
Conservative hold		Swing		+6.01	

2008 Canadian federal election
Party	Candidate	Votes	%	±%	Expenditures
Conservative	Michael Chong	29,191	57.63	+6.97	$67,429
Liberal	Bruce Bowser	11,312	22.33	-6.83	$71,000
Green	Brent Bouteiller	4,987	9.84	+3.74	$1,497
New Democratic	Noel Duignan	4,747	9.37	-2.94	$800
Christian Heritage	Jeffrey Streutker	414	0.81	-0.29	$416
Total valid votes/Expense limit		50,651	100.00		$85,604
Conservative hold		Swing		+6.9	

2006 Canadian federal election
Party	Candidate	Votes	%	±%	Expenditures
Conservative	Michael Chong	27,907	50.75	+7.95	$73,993
Liberal	Rod Finnie	16,065	29.22	-8.99	$55,605
New Democratic	Noel Duignan	6,785	12.34	+0.43	$5,496
Green	Brent Bouteiller	3,362	6.11	+0.68	$1,102
Christian Heritage	Carol Ann Krusky	606	1.10	-0.54	$4,944
Independent	Mike Wisniewski	355	0.65	–	$1,174
Total valid votes		54,987	100.00	$78,546	
Conservative hold		Swing		+8.47	

2004 Canadian federal election
Party	Candidate	Votes	%	±%	Expenditures
Conservative	Michael Chong	21,479	42.81	–	$64,026
Liberal	Bruce Hood	19,173	38.21	–	$73,831
New Democratic	Noel Duignan	5,974	11.91	–	$13,594
Green	Brent Bouteiller	2,725	5.43	–	$799
Christian Heritage	Pat Woode	826	1.65	–	$2,304
Total valid votes		50,177	100.00		$75,799
Conservative hold		Swing		+6.01	

== See also ==
- List of Canadian electoral districts
- Historical federal electoral districts of Canada
