= Walt Elliot =

Canadian politician (1933–2020)

Member of the Ontario Provincial Parliament for Halton North
- In office 1987–1990
- Preceded by: New riding
- Succeeded by: Noel Duignan

Personal details
- Born: Robert Walter Elliot; October 17, 1933 Chesley, Ontario, Canada
- Died: June 4, 2020 (aged 86) Milton, Ontario, Canada
- Party: Liberal
- Occupation: Teacher

Robert Walter Elliot (October 17, 1933 – June 4, 2020) was a politician in Ontario, Canada. He was a Liberal member of the Legislative Assembly of Ontario from 1987 to 1990. He represented the riding of Halton North.

== Background ==
Elliot was educated at Kitchener-Waterloo College, Brock University and McMaster University, receiving a Master of Education degree. He worked as a high-school math teacher and principal before entering political life, and was a Freemason.

== Politics ==
He first ran for the Ontario legislature in the 1977 provincial election, but lost to Progressive Conservative incumbent James Snow by about 6,500 votes in the constituency of Oakville. He ran again in the 1981 election, and lost to Snow by an even greater margin.

He was elected in the 1987 election, defeating PC candidate Dave Whitling by 4,724 votes in the redistributed riding of Halton North. Elliot was a backbench supporter of David Peterson's government after the election, and served as a parliamentary assistant to the Minister of Housing in 1989-90.

The Liberals were defeated by the New Democratic Party in the 1990 provincial election, and Elliot lost his seat to NDP candidate Noel Duignan by 548 votes. He sought a comeback to the legislature in the 1995 election, but lost to Progressive Conservative candidate Ted Chudleigh in a landslide.

== Later life ==
Elliot later served as fundraising chair for the Halton Museum. He died on June 4, 2020, at the age of 86.
