= Ted Chudleigh =

Canadian politician

Member of the Ontario Provincial Parliament for Halton Halton North (1995-1999)
- In office 1995–2014
- Preceded by: Noel Duignan
- Succeeded by: Indira Naidoo-Harris

Personal details
- Born: 1943 (age 82–83) Peel County, Ontario
- Party: Progressive Conservative
- Relations: Thomas Laird Kennedy, grandfather
- Occupation: Businessman

Ted Chudleigh (born c. 1943) is a former politician in Ontario, Canada. He was a Progressive Conservative member of the Legislative Assembly of Ontario from 1995 to 2014, representing the ridings of Halton North and later Halton. Chudleigh is the grandson of Thomas Laird Kennedy, who served as Premier of Ontario in 1949.

== Background ==
Chudleigh was born in Peel County, Ontario in 1943. He received a Bachelor of Science degree from Michigan State University in 1965. He later worked for the Ministry of Agriculture, and owned an IGA store in the Niagara Region. From 1980 to 1995, he was the Executive Vice-President of the Ontario Food Processors Association. His brother Tom Chudleigh is the owner of Chudleigh's Limited, a commercial bakery and farm based in the Milton area whose frozen desserts are sold by grocery retailers throughout North America.

== Politics ==
He was elected to the Ontario legislature in the provincial election of 1995, defeating Liberal Walt Elliot and incumbent New Democrat Noel Duignan in the riding of Halton North. He was re-elected in the redistributed riding of Halton in the 1999 provincial election, by a margin of over 20,000 votes over his closest opponent. Chudleigh served as a backbench supporter for Premiers Mike Harris and Ernie Eves.

The Tories lost the provincial election of 2003, and Chudleigh was returned with a greatly reduced margin of victory. He endorsed Frank Klees's unsuccessful bid to lead the Progressive Conservative Party in 2004.

Ted Chudleigh was re-elected as the MPP for Halton in the 2007 provincial election by 176 votes over the Liberal candidate Gary Zemlak, and was re-elected for a fifth time in 2011 by more than 3,000 votes over Liberal candidate Indira Naidoo-Harris. In 2014, Chudleigh faced Naidoo-Harris again, this time losing to her by about 4,000 votes.

During his time in government he served as Parliamentary Assistant to several ministers. During his time in opposition he was his party's critic for various roles and between 2004 and 2011 he served as Deputy Opposition Whip.
