= Wellington—Halton Hills North =

Federal electoral district in Ontario, Canada

Ontario electoral district
- Interactive map of riding boundaries from the 2025 federal election

Federal electoral district
- Legislature: House of Commons
- District created: 2023
- First contested: 2025
- District webpage: profile, map

Demographics
- Population (2021): 105,468
- Electors (2025): 86,493
- Area (km²): 1,370
- Census division(s): Halton, Wellington
- Census subdivision(s): Guelph (part), Halton Hills (part), Centre Wellington, Guelph/Eramosa, Erin, Puslinch

Wellington—Halton Hills North (French: Wellington—Halton Hills-Nord) is a federal electoral district in Ontario, Canada. It came into effect upon the call of the 2025 Canadian federal election.

== Geography ==
Under the 2022 Canadian federal electoral redistribution the riding largely replaced Wellington—Halton Hills.

- Gains the City of Guelph neighbourhoods of University Village, Kortright Hills, Clairfields and Westminster from Guelph
- Loses the Georgetown area and the parts of Halton Hills south of Sideroad 15 to Milton East—Halton Hills South

== Demographics ==
According to the 2021 Canadian census

Languages: 85.3% English, 1.6% French, 1.3% Punjabi, 1.1% Mandarin

Religions: 55.9% Christian (23.6% Catholic, 6.1% United Church, 5.0% Anglican, 3.5% Presbyterian, 1.1% Reformed, 1.1% Baptist, 1.1% Christian Orthodox, 14.3% Other), 37.1% No religion, 2.6% Muslim, 1.6% Hindu, 1.6% Sikh

Median income: $48,000 (2020)

Average income: $64,700 (2020)

Panethnic groups in Wellington—Halton Hills North (2021)
| Panethnic group | 2021 | |
| Panethnic group | Pop. | % |
|---|---|---|
| European (Note: Statistic includes all persons that did not make up part of a visible minority or an indigenous identity.) | 87,690 | 84.14% |
| South Asian | 5,580 | 5.35% |
| East Asian (Note: Statistic includes total responses of "Chinese", "Korean", and "Japanese" under visible minority section on census.) | 2,640 | 2.53% |
| African | 1,745 | 1.67% |
| Indigenous | 1,645 | 1.58% |
| Southeast Asian (Note: Statistic includes total responses of "Filipino" and "Southeast Asian" under visible minority section on census.) | 1,520 | 1.46% |
| Middle Eastern (Note: Statistic includes total responses of "West Asian" and "Arab" under visible minority section on census.) | 1,380 | 1.32% |
| Latin American | 930 | 0.89% |
| Other/multiracial (Note: Statistic includes total responses of "Visible minority, n.i.e." and "Multiple visible minorities" under visible minority section on census.) | 1,095 | 1.05% |
| Total responses | 104,225 | 99.15% |
| Total population | 105,115 | 100% |
Notes: Totals greater than 100% due to multiple origin responses. Demographics based on 2022 Canadian federal electoral redistribution riding boundaries.

== History ==
| Parliament | Years | Member | Party |
|---|---|---|---|
Wellington—Halton Hills North; Riding created from Guelph and Wellington—Halton Hills
| 45th | 2025–present | Michael Chong | Conservative |

== Election results ==
2025 Canadian federal election
| Party | Candidate | Votes | % | ±% | Expenditures |
|---|---|---|---|---|---|
| Conservative | Michael Chong | 34,476 | 51.16 | +4.38 | |
| Liberal | Sean Carscadden | 29,609 | 43.93 | +13.68 | |
| Green | Liam Stiles | 1,389 | 2.06 | –2.64 | |
| New Democratic | Andrew Bascombe | 1,353 | 2.01 | –9.95 | |
| People's | Syl Carle | 566 | 0.84 | –5.35 | |
| Total valid votes/expense limit | | | | | |
| Total rejected ballots | | | | | |
| Turnout | | 67,393 | 76.91 | | |
| Eligible voters | | 87,623 | | | |
| Conservative notional hold | | Swing | | –4.65 | |
Source: Elections Canada

2021 federal election redistributed results
| Party | Vote | % |
|---|---|---|
| Conservative | 26,208 | 46.78 |
| Liberal | 16,949 | 30.25 |
| New Democratic | 6,698 | 11.96 |
| People's | 3,467 | 6.19 |
| Green | 2,635 | 4.70 |
| Others | 68 | 0.12 |

== Student vote results ==
2025 Wellington—Halton Hills North student vote
| 49.75% | 24.90% | 11.96% | 9.33% | 4.07% |
| Conservative | Liberal | Green | NDP | PPC |

== See also ==
- List of Canadian electoral districts
