= Chinese Canadian Conservative Association =

Non-profit organization

- Chinese Canadian Conservative Association of Canada
- Formation: 1983
- Registration no.: 871791-5
- Members: 1000
- Key people: Joe Li (spokesman), Eric Wen (secretary general), John Wei-Bang Zhu (National Chairman)

The Chinese Canadian Conservative Association (CCCA), officially the Chinese Canadian Conservative Association of Canada, is a non-profit organization that represents Chinese Canadian members of the Conservative Party of Canada.

The organization was founded in 1983 to encourage Chinese Canadian involvement in conservative politics. It has no formal relationship or financial ties to the federal Conservatives, but members of the CCCA must be members of the federal Conservative Party.

Prime Minister Stephen Harper attended the CCCA's 25th Anniversary dinner in 2008, stating that the CCCA has played an invaluable role in developing and promoting Conservative principles and policies." At the time, the organization was led by Alex Yuan, a software developer who was born in Hong Kong.

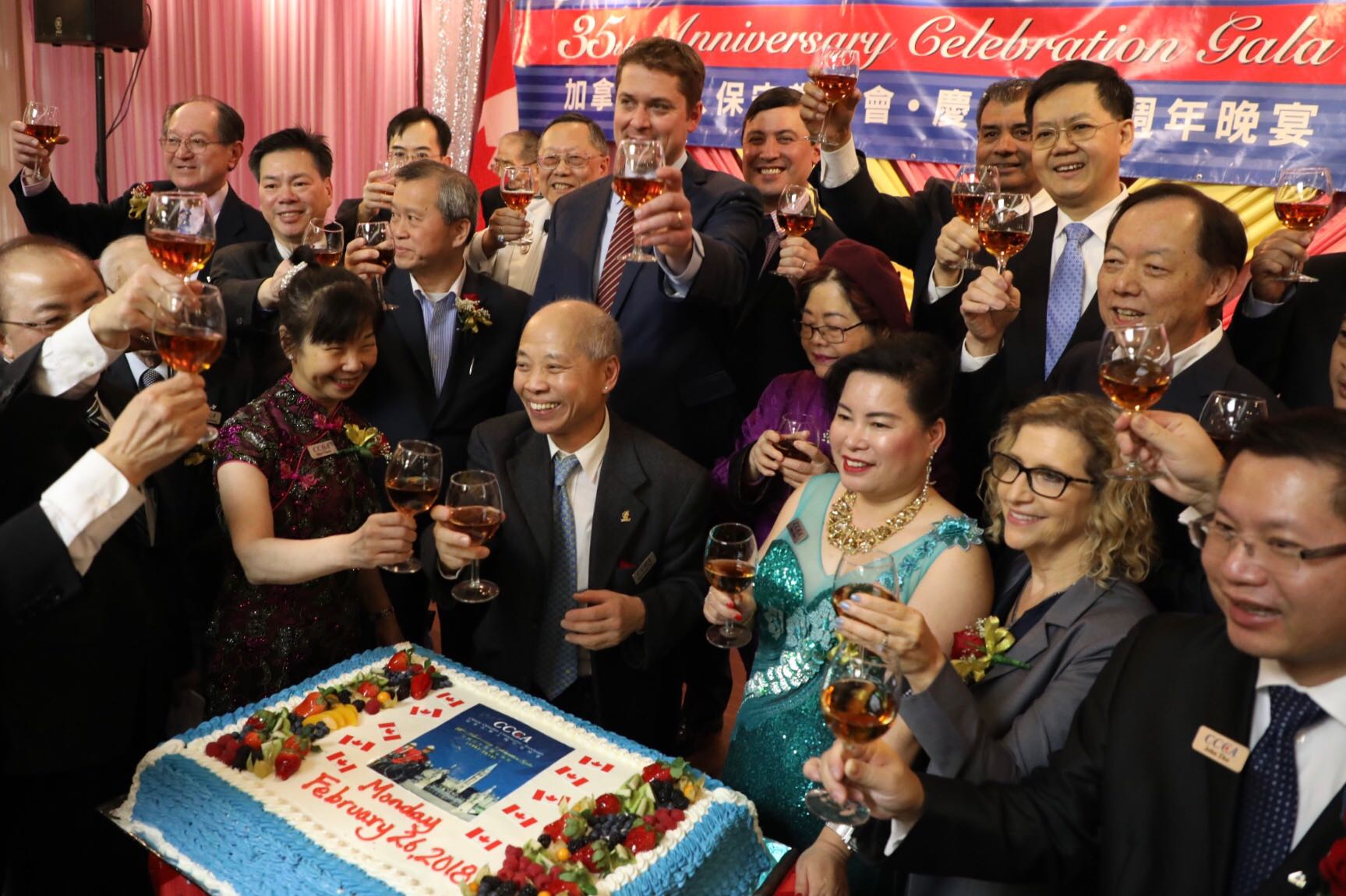
Andrew Scheer at the Chinese Canadian Conservative Association (2018)

In October 2021, the group organized a press conference urging Conservative leader Erin O'Toole to resign, during which it criticized a perceived "hatred message" towards China that it claims had been pushed by O'Toole – blaming Conservative seat losses during that year's election on such rhetoric. According to a report by the National Post, spokesperson Joe Li stated he personally supported Chinese unification and the right of the People's Liberation Army to fly military aircraft over Taiwan. He also blamed Canada for instigating the confrontation that resulted in the detention of the two Michaels, stating that they were only detained after "Canada started the war." The paper also alleged Li made statements claiming that Canada "should not publicly criticize Beijing’s human-rights abuses".

The following May, after O'Toole's ouster, the CCCA endorsed Patrick Brown for Conservative Party leadership, an endorsement that Brown was "honoured" to receive.

== See also ==
- Chinese government interference in Canada
- Chinese neoconservatism
