= Bruce Hood (ice hockey) =

Canadian ice hockey referee (1936–2018)

- Born: Bruce Melvin Hood; March 14, 1936; Campbellville, Ontario, Canada
- Died: January 5, 2018 (aged 81); Guelph, Ontario, Canada
- Occupation: NHL official (1963 - 1984)
- Children: 3

Bruce Melvin Hood (March 14, 1936 – January 5, 2018) was a Canadian author, businessman, politician, and a professional ice hockey referee in the National Hockey League (NHL).

== Early life ==
Hood was born in Campbellville, Ontario, Canada (now part of the Town of Milton) on March 14, 1936, and moved into Milton in 1947. In the late-1940s and 1950s, Hood wrote an occasional sports column for the Milton Canadian Champion newspaper; played for Milton junior and senior hockey clubs; was the statistician for the Milton Minor Hockey Association, the Milton Industrial Hockey League and the Central Ontario Hockey League; secretary of the Halton County Baseball Association; referee in chief of the Tri-County Hockey League and the Milton Referees' Association; as well as having played junior hockey with Oakville, Georgetown and Brampton, juvenile with Acton and commercial hockey in Burlington.

Hood officiated his first Intermediate hockey game in 1957 after a linesman was cut in a game he was serving as a back-up for. During the 1961-62 season, he served as a linesman in his first full season in the OHA Junior "A" league, before working in the 1962 Memorial Cup Finals between Hamilton and Edmonton.

In the fall of 1962, Hood left Milton to go officiate in the International Hockey League in the central U.S. before moving on to the NHL.

After 1962-63 Hood joined the NHL pool of referees. Between 1963 and 1965, he handled Central, American and Western Hockey League games, before getting an NHL trial in 1966.

== Officiating record ==
During his 21-year NHL career, Hood officiated 1,033 regular season games, 157 Stanley Cup playoff games, three All-Star Games, and three Canada Cups. He was the first professional to referee a World Championship game in 1985 in Prague, Czechoslovakia.

As an NHL referee, Hood was instrumental in the formation of the NHL Officials Association in 1969. After the NHL referees walked out of a training camp in Brantford, Ontario, six of the 20 referees continued to work out in Hood's hometown of Milton in late September 1969.

He was the last official to wear a number one on his jersey and the last to officiate in all Original Six arenas. In 1994, Hood was nominated to the Hockey Hall of Fame by 12 existing members, including former players like Bobby Hull and Maurice Richard. But, as of 2017, has not been elected as a member of the Hall.

Hood was the referee for Game 4 of the 1970 Stanley Cup Finals, when Boston Bruins legend Bobby Orr scored the Cup-winning goal 40 seconds into overtime by firing the puck past St. Louis Blues goalie Glenn Hall. Orr was tripped moments later by Blues defenceman Noel Picard, and the picture of Orr flying through the air became one of hockey's most iconic moments. The Mother's Day victory at Boston Garden gave Boston its first Cup since 1941.

=== Controversies ===
One of the last NHL games Hood officiated was an infamous playoff match between the Montreal Canadiens and Quebec Nordiques on April 20, 1984, known as the Good Friday Massacre. The teams brawled for a full hour after the end of the second period. Hood's decision to continue the game was controversial, particularly when the announcement of penalties at the start of the third period provoked another brawl.

Hood was involved in another controversy during the 1984 playoffs. In Game 2 of the Campbell Conference finals between the Minnesota North Stars and Edmonton Oilers, Hood allowed a goal by the Oilers' Jari Kurri that proved to be the difference in a 4-3 Oiler victory, even though it appeared that the puck did not cross the goal line. Hood ruled that the puck had crossed the line while it was being cradled in the catching glove of North Stars goalie Don Beaupre. Edmonton would sweep the series by winning Games 3 and 4 in Bloomington, Minnesota en route to the franchise's first Stanley Cup championship.

He retired after the 1984 NHL playoffs.

== Business ==
For eighteen years, Hood operated developmental camps for hockey officials, which attracted students from several countries, and designed a line of officiating equipment.

Hood operated a series of local travel agencies in the late 1980s and 1990s, serving as vice-chair of the Travel Industry Council of Ontario and president of the Association of Canadian Travel Agents. He was appointed as Air Travel Complaints Commissioner in the summer of 2000, and served until 2002. David Jeanes, the president of Transport 2000, claimed that Hood had accomplished "an excellent job establishing this new consumer-protection office". After leaving this position, he worked in mediation and marketing.

Hood authored two books, Calling the Shots in 1988 and The Good of the Game in 1999.

== Politics ==
He sought the Ontario Liberal Party nomination in Halton North for the 1987 election, and the federal Liberal nomination in Oakville—Milton in 1993, but lost both times (Guelph Mercury, 29 June 2004).

Hood received 19,173 votes (38.21%) in the 2004 election running in the newly formed riding of Wellington—Halton Hills, finishing a close second against Conservative candidate Michael Chong.

== Awards ==
Hood was inducted into the Milton Walk of Fame at the Milton Town Hall.

In November 2017, Hood was inducted into the Milton Sports Hall of Fame in the builder category. His sons accepted the honour on his behalf as he was in hospital battling cancer.

== Death and legacy ==
Hood died on January 5, 2018, from prostate cancer. In an interview with The Canadian Press, his son Kevin Hood offered this comment: "He wanted to be the best at everything he did in his life, and refereeing was no exception. He would always say, 'You're only half right most of the time.' Half the crowd's with you and half the crowd's against you. The games when you weren't noticed, those were the best."

NHL commissioner Gary Bettman said that "Bruce Hood brought professionalism and integrity to every game he worked and earned the respect of the players, coaches, general managers — as well as his peers. In addition to his command of the game and his ability to communicate on the ice, Bruce had a characteristic calmness that brought his excellence to the fore when the pressure was greatest".
