= Halton North =

Former provincial electoral district in Ontario, Canada

Ontario electoral district

Defunct provincial electoral district
- Legislature: Legislative Assembly of Ontario
- District created: 1986
- District abolished: 1996
- First contested: 1987
- Last contested: 1995

Halton North was a provincial electoral district in Ontario, Canada. It existed from 1987 to 1999, when it was abolished when ridings were redistributed to match their federal counterpart. It consisted of the northern areas of Halton Region.

== Members of Provincial Parliament ==
- Walt Elliot (Liberal) (1987–1990)
- Noel Duignan (New Democrat) (1990–1995)
- Ted Chudleigh (Progressive Conservative) (1995–1999)

Halton North
Assembly	Years	Member	Party
Riding created out of Halton—Burlington
34th	1987–1990	Walt Elliot	Liberal
35th	1990–1995	Noel Duignan	New Democratic
36th	1995–1999	Ted Chudleigh	Progressive Conservative
Riding dissolved into Halton

== Election results ==
1995 Ontario general election
Party	Candidate	Votes	%	±%
Progressive Conservative	Ted Chudleigh	19,247	60.90	+33.64
Liberal	Walt Elliot	6,568	20.78	–8.17
New Democratic	Noel Duignan	4,362	13.80	–17.14
Family Coalition	Alex McKee	1,239	3.92	–5.13
Libertarian	John Shadbolt	187	0.59	–1.08
Total valid votes		31,603	99.43	
Total rejected, unmarked and declined ballots		180	0.57	–1.07
Turnout		31,783	66.58	+2.08
Eligible voters		47,738		
Progressive Conservative gain from New Democratic		Swing		+25.39
Source: Elections Ontario

1990 Ontario general election
Party	Candidate	Votes	%	±%
New Democratic	Noel Duignan	8,510	30.94	+7.15
Liberal	Walt Elliot	7,962	28.95	–18.85
Progressive Conservative	Dave Whiting	7,499	27.27	–1.14
Family Coalition	Giuseppe Gori	2,489	9.05	–
Green	Patricia Kammerer	582	2.12	–
Libertarian	John Shadbolt	461	1.68	–
Total valid votes		27,503	98.37	
Total rejected, unmarked and declined ballots		457	1.63	+1.12
Turnout		27,960	64.50	+7.06
Eligible voters		43,348		
New Democratic gain from Liberal		Swing		+4.15
Source: Elections Ontario

1987 Ontario general election
Party	Candidate	Votes	%
Liberal	Walt Elliot	11,644	47.80
Progressive Conservative	Dave Whiting	6,920	28.41
New Democratic	Fern Wolf	5,796	23.79
Total valid votes		24,360	99.49
Total rejected ballots		125	0.51
Turnout		24,485	57.45
Eligible voters		42,623	
Liberal pickup new district.			
Source: Elections Ontario

== See also ==
- List of Ontario provincial electoral districts
- Canadian provincial electoral districts
