= Chinese government interference in Canada =

The Centre Block on Parliament Hill

In Canada, the Chinese government has conducted espionage, compromised politicians and government officials, interfered in elections, and controlled individuals and companies with ties to the government or the Chinese Communist Party (CCP). In 2025, a parliamentary inquiry concluded that China was "the most active perpetrator of state-based foreign interference targeting Canada's democratic institutions."

== Background ==
The Canadian government has been tracking Chinese government efforts to influence Canada since at least 1986. These overseas influence operations have allegedly risen to the extent that they represent an alarming security threat to the United States, which conducted a secret probe into the issue in the 1990s, according to former Canadian and US intelligence officials. A teaching manual of the United Front Work Department of the Central Committee of the Chinese Communist Party mentioned approvingly having its preferred candidates elected in Toronto in 2003 and 2006. In 2026, the Jamestown Foundation identified 575 "united front" organizations in Canada. A February 2026 report by the Montreal Institute for Global Security documented instances of transnational repression in Canada linked to China, including intimidation, surveillance, and digital harassment targeting individuals.

== Trudeau cash-for-access scandal ==
In 2016, newspaper sources reported that Justin Trudeau had been attending cash-for-access events at the homes of wealthy Chinese Canadians in Toronto and Vancouver, generating a political scandal. Attendees at these events, including those with connections to the CCP, would pay up to $1,525 per ticket to meet Trudeau. In response, the Liberal Party indicated that all party fundraising complied with Elections Canada rules and regulations.

== Operation of Chinese police stations in Canada ==
While there is no official Chinese police presence on Canadian soil, several reports and allegations have surfaced regarding the presence of clandestine Chinese police stations in Canada. Among these are claims that Chinese law enforcement officials have been conducting unofficial operations within Canadian borders, targeting Chinese nationals and Canadian citizens alike.

Clandestine Chinese police stations were reported to operate in Vancouver, Montreal, and Toronto. They could be used to intimidate, monitor, and control the Chinese community in Canada, potentially infringing upon their rights and freedoms. Furthermore, there have been claims by the Canadian Security Intelligence Service (CSIS) that Chinese law enforcement officers have been operating under the guise of Chinese community organizations or businesses in Canada, further blurring the lines between legitimate community support and potential foreign government influence. Chinese foreign ministry spokesperson Mao Ning described the outposts as "service stations" for Chinese abroad, and accused Canada of "smearing".

Prime Minister Justin Trudeau responded to the reports in March 2023 by saying that "we've known about the (presence of) Chinese police stations across the country for many months, and we are making sure that the RCMP is following up on it and that our intelligence services take it seriously."

In 2023, the Royal Canadian Mounted Police (RCMP) was reported to be investigating the activities of two alleged Chinese police stations in Quebec: one in Montreal and the other in nearby Brossard. The RCMP is also investigating the activities of alleged Chinese police stations in Vancouver and the Greater Toronto Area.

While the US has already conducted arrests over Chinese police stations operating on its territory, no closures or arrests of overseas police station personnel have taken place in Canada. The lack of a foreign agents registry, as exists in the US, UK, and Australia, is cited as being a major impediment to enforcement against Chinese police stations operating in Canada.

Two Chinese community groups in the Montreal area have declared they will sue the RCMP if they do not apologize for their accusations of them hosting secret Chinese police stations, and are seeking CAN$2.5 million in damages. Maryse Lapointe, the groups' lawyer, called the allegations false and defamatory. Mei Chiu, coordinator of the Chinatown roundtable in Montreal, criticized the RCMP's investigation of these groups for not even asking to talk to the employees, and only interviewing the board members. The groups say they have lost government funding, forcing them to cut back programs such as French language education and support of victims of domestic violence. The RCMP stated broadly: "some of the activity the RCMP is investigating is occurring at locations where other legitimate services to the Chinese Canadian Community are being offered."

== Intimidation of Canadian politicians ==
In a 2023 report by The Globe and Mail, based on a top-secret intelligence document and an anonymous national security source, the family of outspoken Conservative MP Michael Chong was allegedly targeted for harassment by the Chinese government as part of China's state interference in Canadian politics. The campaign against Chong's family began in February 2021 after Chong voted in favor of a House of Commons motion condemning China's treatment of its Uyghur minority as genocide. At the time, China sanctioned Chong by barring him from entry and prohibiting Chinese citizens from conducting business with him.

As part of the intimidation operation to get Chong to change his political position, an officer in the Ministry of State Security gathered information to target Chong's family in China. Chong also revealed that a Toronto-based Chinese diplomat, Wei Jo, “was involved in conducting these intimidation operations”. Chong accused the federal government of failing to inform him about allegations that Beijing wanted to intimidate his family.

Prime Minister Justin Trudeau said Wednesday he knew that after Chong was sanctioned by China in 2021, CSIS was giving the MP what Trudeau called “defensive” briefings, but claimed that CSIS withheld information about China's threats to Chong. However, Chong claims that the top secret document made its way to Trudeau's national security advisor and the Privy Council's Office. According to CBC News, Prime Minister Justin Trudeau says he has told Canada's spy agency it needs to share more information about threats to MPs while being adamant that he only learned of reports that the Chinese government was targeting a Conservative MP and his family this week.

The Trudeau government has been reluctant to expel Wei Jo, the Chinese diplomat involved, because it will affect "economic interests, consular interests, and also diplomatic interests," according to Foreign Affairs Minister Melanie Joly, and could lead to "potential backlash". Chong says that he is "astounded" by this reluctance and believes that it will embolden China to target more Canadians.

According to Chong, other Canadian MPs are also alleged to have been targeted by the Ministry of State Security, but their identities have not been revealed. In August 2023, the Ministry of Foreign Affairs stated that Chong and his family had been the target of an online disinformation operation by the Chinese government.

== Social media influence operations ==
China is reported to use social media platforms like WeChat to shape public opinion and manipulate political discourse among the Chinese Canadian diaspora. This includes the spreading of false or misleading information to create confusion, sow discord, or undermine confidence in political institutions. By using bots and fake accounts, China is able to amplify divisive content or create the appearance of grassroots support for certain narratives. The Chinese government also uses astroturfing through the creation of seemingly independent, grassroots movements that are, in fact, controlled or funded by the Chinese government or its proxies. These groups may use social media to promote pro-CCP narratives, discredit critics, or manipulate public opinion.

In February 2025, a Canadian government task force reported that a coordinated state-backed campaign on WeChat targeted Chrystia Freeland.

== Interference in 2019 and 2021 federal elections ==
The People's Republic of China (PRC) made attempts to interfere in the 2019 Canadian federal election and 2021 Canadian federal election and threatened Canadian politicians, according to Canadian Security Intelligence Service (CSIS) and the Parliament of Canada's Foreign Interference Commission. In late 2022, the Global News television network reported on a suspected attempt by the PRC to infiltrate the Parliament of Canada by funding a network of candidates to run in the 2019 Canadian federal election. In early 2023, The Globe and Mail newspaper published a series of articles reporting that the CSIS, in several classified documents, advised that China's Ministry of State Security (MSS) and United Front Work Department had employed disinformation campaigns and undisclosed donations to support preferred candidates during the 2021 Canadian federal election, with the aim of ensuring that the Liberals would win again, but only with a minority. In February 2023, CSIS concluded that the Chinese government interfered in the 2019 and 2021 elections. In May 2024, an official probe by parliament's Foreign Interference Commission found that China interfered in both elections.

== Other influence operations ==
Chinese security agencies are known to try to compromise Canadian officials who travel to China.

According to the 2017 “Memorandum for the Prime Minister”, prepared by Trudeau's National Security Advisor, Daniel Jean, “Canadian officials are highly likely to be subjects of Chinese efforts to exert undue influence or otherwise compromise their independence during travel to China." The Chinese People's Institute of Foreign Affairs (CPIFA), which reports to the United Front Work Department, is one of the key state agencies that regularly funds trips of Canadian politicians. Between 2006 and 2017, Canadian parliamentarians took 36 trips to China, sponsored by arms of the Chinese government or by Chinese-affiliated business groups.

In 2018, Ted Jiancheng Zhou, owner of Shanghai Oriental Capital Group and Evertrust Development Group Canada Inc., travelled to China with Conservative senators Victor Oh, Don Plett, and Leo Housakos, along with their spouses. On this two-week all-expense paid trip, the politicians were introduced to senior Chinese Communist Party officials and fêted, including at a lavish dinner at the five-star St. Regis Hotel in Beijing.

During the years he was a backbench MP from 2008 to 2015, John McCallum, who subsequently served as ambassador to China for the Trudeau government, is reported to have enjoyed $73,300 in all-expenses paid trips to China at the expense of Beijing-friendly groups, prior to being appointed ambassador.

In July 2023, a former RCMP officer, William Majcher, was arrested in Vancouver on accusations of conducting foreign interference operations on behalf of the Chinese government.

In the lead-up to the 2025 Canadian federal election, Conservative Party candidate Joe Tay was the target of an arrest warrant from the Hong Kong Police Force and a repression campaign by China-based social networks. Liberal Party candidate Paul Chiang suggested someone should claim the bounty, which prompted an RCMP investigation followed by Chiang's resignation.

In January 2025, the Public Inquiry into Foreign Interference in Federal Electoral Processes and Democratic Institutions concluded that China was "the most active perpetrator of state-based foreign interference targeting Canada's democratic institutions."

== See also ==
- Foreign electoral intervention
- Entryism
- Chinese intelligence activity abroad
- Chinese police overseas service stations
- Canada–China relations
- Countering Foreign Interference Act
