= Policy =

Guidelines to guide decisions and achieve rational outcomes

Policy is a deliberate system of guidelines to guide decisions and achieve rational outcomes. A policy is a statement of intent and is implemented as a procedure or protocol. Policies are generally adopted by a governance body within an organization. Policies can assist in both subjective and objective decision making. Policies used in subjective decision-making usually assist senior management with decisions that must be based on the relative merits of a number of factors, and as a result, are often hard to test objectively, e.g. work–life balance policy. Moreover, governments and other institutions have policies in the form of laws, regulations, procedures, administrative actions, incentives and voluntary practices. Frequently, resource allocations mirror policy decisions.

Policies intended to assist in objective decision-making are usually operational in nature and can be objectively tested, e.g. a password policy.

The term may apply to government, public sector organizations and groups, businesses and individuals. Presidential executive orders, corporate privacy policies, and parliamentary rules of order are all examples of policy. Policy differs from rules or law. While the law can compel or prohibit behaviors (e.g. a law requiring the payment of taxes on income), policy merely guides actions toward those that are most likely to achieve the desired outcome.

Policy or policy study may also refer to the process of making important organizational decisions, including the identification of different alternatives such as programs or spending priorities, and choosing among them on the basis of the impact they will have. Policies can be understood as political, managerial, financial, and administrative mechanisms arranged to reach explicit goals. In public corporate finance, a critical accounting policy is a policy for a firm or company or an industry that is considered to have a notably high subjective element, and that has a material impact on the financial statements.

It has been argued that policies ought to be evidence-based. An individual or organization is justified in claiming that a specific policy is evidence-based if, and only if, three conditions are met. First, the individual or organization possesses comparative evidence about the effects of the specific policy in comparison to the effects of at least one alternative policy. Second, the specific policy is supported by this evidence according to at least one of the individual's or organization's preferences in the given policy area. Third, the individual or organization can provide a sound account for this support by explaining the evidence and preferences that lay the foundation for the claim.

Policies are dynamic; they are not just static lists of goals or laws. Policy blueprints have to be implemented, often with unexpected results. Social policies are what happens 'on the ground' when they are implemented, as well as what happens at the decision making or legislative stage.

When the term policy is used, it may also refer to:

- Official government policy (legislation or guidelines that govern how laws should be put into operation)

== Effects ==
=== Intended effects and policy-design ===
The intended effects of a policy vary widely according to the organization and the context in which they are made. Policy, as opposed to the more specific Public Policy, is the broad application of authority on a situation by any actor for goals intended by that actor. A way to extract the stated aims of a public policy is to analyze the goals embedded in the legislation or organization that establishes it. This approach helps clarify the explicit intentions behind a policy and provides a normative foundation for evaluating its effectiveness in practice.

A meta-analysis of policy studies concluded that international treaties that aim to foster global cooperation have mostly failed to produce their intended effects in addressing global challenges, and sometimes may have led to unintended harmful or net negative effects. The study suggests enforcement mechanisms are the "only modifiable treaty design choice" with the potential to improve the effectiveness.

The State of California provides an example of benefit-seeking policy. In recent years, the numbers of hybrid cars in California has increased dramatically, in part because of policy changes in Federal law that provided US$1,500 in tax credits (since phased out) and enabled the use of high-occupancy vehicle lanes to drivers of hybrid vehicles. In this case, the organization (state or federal government) created an effect (increased ownership and use of hybrid vehicles) through policy (tax breaks, highway lanes).

=== Unintended ===
Policies frequently have side effects or unintended consequences. Because the environments that policies seek to influence or manipulate are typically complex adaptive systems (e.g. governments, societies, large companies), making a policy change can have counterintuitive results. For example, a government may make a policy decision to raise taxes, in hopes of increasing overall tax revenue. Depending on the size of the tax increase, this may have the overall effect of reducing tax revenue by causing capital flight or by creating a rate so high that citizens are deterred from earning the money that is taxed. (Note: For more information on the effect of tax policy on state revenues, see Laffer curve.)

The policy formulation process theoretically includes an attempt to assess as many areas of potential policy impact as possible, to lessen the chances that a given policy will have unexpected or unintended consequences.

== Cycle ==
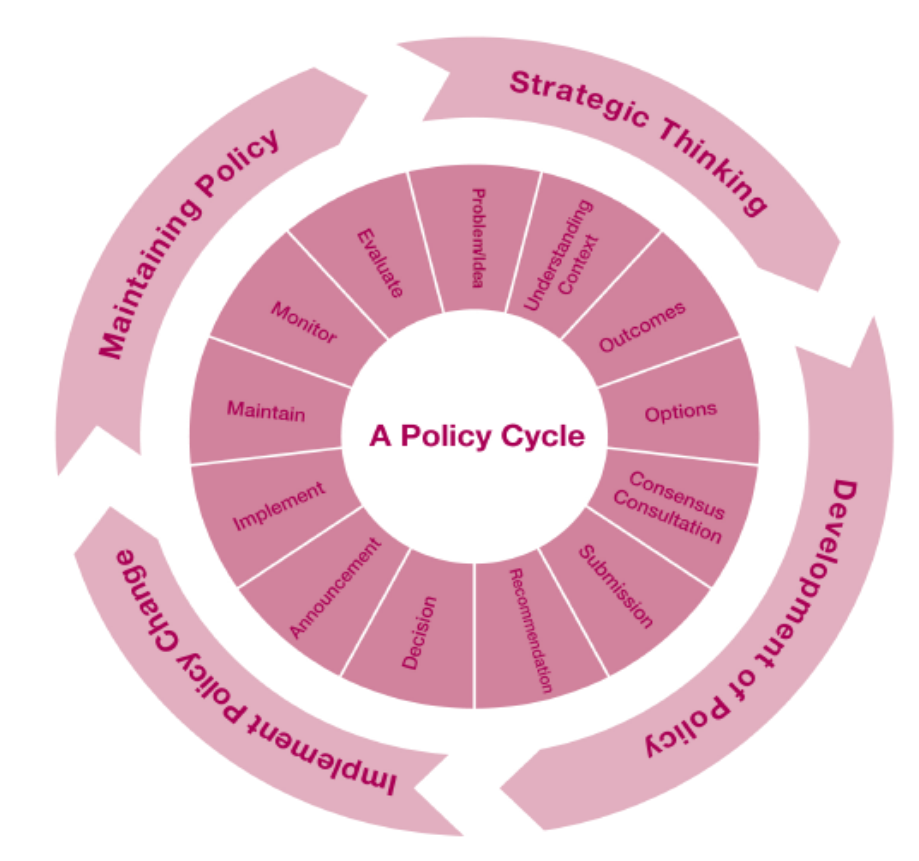
Example of the policy cycle concept

In political science, the policy cycle is a tool commonly used for analyzing the development of a policy. It can also be referred to as a "stages model" or "stages heuristic". It is thus a rule of thumb rather than the actual reality of how policy is created, but has been influential in how political scientists looked at policy in general. It was developed as a theory from Harold Lasswell's work. Later scholarship argues that stages models oversimplify policymaking, which is often iterative and shaped by multiple actors and shifting implementation contexts. It is called the policy cycle as the final stage (evaluation) often leads back to the first stage (problem definition), thus restarting the cycle.

Harold Lasswell's popular model of the policy cycle divided the process into seven distinct stages, asking questions of both how and why public policies should be made. With the stages ranging from (1) intelligence, (2) promotion, (3) prescription, (4) invocation, (5) application, (6) termination and (7) appraisal, this process inherently attempts to combine policy implementation to formulated policy goals.

One version by James E. Anderson, in his Public Policy-Making (1974) has the following stages:

1. Agenda setting (Problem identification) – The recognition of certain subject as a problem demanding further government attention.
2. Policy formulation – Involves exploring a variation of options or alternative courses of action available for addressing the problem. (appraisal, dialogue, formulation, and consolidation)
3. Decision-making – Government decides on an ultimate course of action, whether to perpetuate the policy status quo or alter it. (Decision could be 'positive', 'negative', or 'no-action')
4. Implementation – The ultimate decision made earlier will be put into practice.
5. Evaluation – Assesses the effectiveness of a public policy in terms of its perceived intentions and results. Policy actors attempt to determine whether the course of action is a success or failure by examining its impact and outcomes.

Anderson's version of the stages model is the most common and widely recognized out of the models. However, it could also be seen as flawed. According to Paul A. Sabatier, the model has "outlived its usefulness" and should be replaced. The model's issues have led to a paradoxical situation in which current research and updated versions of the model continue to rely on the framework created by Anderson. But the very concept of the stages model has been discredited, which attacks the cycle's status as a heuristic.

Due to these problems, alternative and newer versions of the model have aimed to create a more comprehensive view of the policy cycle. An eight step policy cycle is developed in detail in The Australian Policy Handbook by Peter Bridgman and Glyn Davis: (now with Catherine Althaus in its 4th and 5th editions)

1. Issue identification
2. Policy analysis
3. Consultation (which permeates the entire process)
4. Policy instrument development
5. Building coordination and coalitions
6. Program Design: Decision making
7. Policy Implementation
8. Policy Evaluation

The Althaus, Bridgman & Davis model is heuristic and iterative. It is intentionally normative (a guide to what policymakers should do), and not intended as a diagnostic or predictive model (a tool for explaining or forecasting what will happen). Policy cycles are typically characterized as adopting a classical approach, and tend to describe processes from the perspective of policy decision makers. Accordingly, some post-positivist academics challenge cyclical models as unresponsive and unrealistic, preferring systemic and more complex models. They consider a broader range of actors involved in the policy space that includes civil society organizations, the media, intellectuals, think tanks or policy research institutes, corporations, lobbyists, etc.

== Content ==
Policies are typically promulgated through official written documents. Policy documents often come with the endorsement or signature of the executive powers within an organization to legitimize the policy and demonstrate that it is considered in force. Such documents often have standard formats that are particular to the organization issuing the policy. While such formats differ in form, policy documents usually contain certain standard components including:

- A purpose statement, outlining why the organization is issuing the policy, and what its desired effect or outcome of the policy should be.
- An applicability and scope statement, describing who the policy affects and which actions are impacted by the policy. The applicability and scope may expressly exclude certain people, organizations, or actions from the policy requirements. Applicability and scope is used to focus the policy on only the desired targets, and avoid unintended consequences where possible.
- An effective date which indicates when the policy comes into force. Retroactive policies are rare, but can be found.
- A responsibilities section, indicating which parties and organizations are responsible for carrying out individual policy statements. Many policies may require the establishment of some ongoing function or action. For example, a purchasing policy might specify that a purchasing office be created to process purchase requests, and that this office would be responsible for ongoing actions. Responsibilities often include identification of any relevant oversight and/or governance structures.
- Policy statements indicating the specific regulations, requirements, or modifications to organizational behavior that the policy is creating. Policy statements are extremely diverse depending on the organization and intent, and may take almost any form.

Some policies may contain additional sections, including:

- Background, indicating any reasons, history, ethical background statements, and/or intent that led to the creation of the policy, which may be listed as motivating factors. This information is often quite valuable when policies must be evaluated or used in ambiguous situations, just as the intent of a law can be useful to a court when deciding a case that involves that law.
- Definitions, providing clear and unambiguous definitions for terms and concepts found in the policy document.

== Policy types ==
Policy types include those which are set by government, political parties and public organisations, and those which are adopted within businesses. Political parties use policies to set out the basis on which they seek popular support at an election. Within businesses, human resource policies and purchasing policies provide examples of how organizations attempt to comply with legal requirements and avoid negative effects. Many large companies have policies stating that all purchases above a certain value must be performed through a purchasing process. By requiring this standard purchasing process through policy, the organization can limit waste and standardize the way purchasing is done.

The American political scientist Theodore J. Lowi proposed four types of public policy, namely distributive, redistributive, regulatory and constituent in his article "Four Systems of Policy, Politics and Choice" and in "American Business, Public Policy, Case Studies and Political Theory". Policy addresses the intent of the organization, whether government, business, professional, or voluntary. Policy is intended to affect the "real" world, by guiding the decisions that are made. Whether they are formally written or not, most organizations have identified policies.

Policies may be classified in many different ways. The following is a sample of several different types of policies broken down by their effect on members of the organization.

=== Distributive ===
Distributive policies involve government allocation of resources, services, or benefits to specific groups or individuals in society. The primary characteristic of distributive policies is that they aim to provide goods or services to a targeted group without significantly reducing the availability or benefits for other groups. These policies are often designed to promote economic or social equity. Examples include subsidies for farmers, social welfare programs, and funding for public education.

=== Regulatory ===
Regulatory policies aim to control or regulate the behavior and practices of individuals, organizations, or industries. These policies are intended to address issues related to public safety, consumer protection, and environmental conservation. Regulatory policies involve government intervention in the form of laws, regulations, and oversight. Examples include environmental regulations, labor laws, and safety standards for food and drugs. Another example of a fairly successful public regulatory policy is that of a highway speed limit.

=== Constituent ===
Constituent policies are less concerned with the allocation of resources or regulation of behavior, and more focused on representing the preferences and values of the public. These policies involve addressing public concerns and issues that may not have direct economic or regulatory implications. They often reflect the broader values and beliefs of the society. Constituent policies can include symbolic gestures, such as resolutions recognizing historical events or designating official state symbols. Constituent policies also deal with fiscal policy in some circumstances.

=== Redistributive ===
Redistributive policies involve the transfer of resources or benefits from one group to another, typically from the wealthy or privileged to the less advantaged. These policies seek to reduce economic or social inequality by taking from those with more and providing for those with less. Progressive taxation, welfare programs, and financial assistance to low-income households are examples of redistributive policies.

=== Horizontal ===
Horizontal policy making and implementation involve joint work across governmental and departmental boundaries and across different social segments. Its aim is to address broad social issues such as poverty and social integration. One example is Quebec's Act to Combat Poverty and Social Exclusion (2002), and its accompanying strategy and action plans.

According to Gail Motsi's analysis of horizontal policy-making for the Institute on Governance, successful horizontal initiatives depend on effective consideration of what needs to be shared and when it needs to be shared. There is a continuum between information sharing, the sharing of objectives and the sharing of authority, with information sharing generally being easiest to establish, and the sharing of authority being the most difficult.

== Notable schools of policy ==
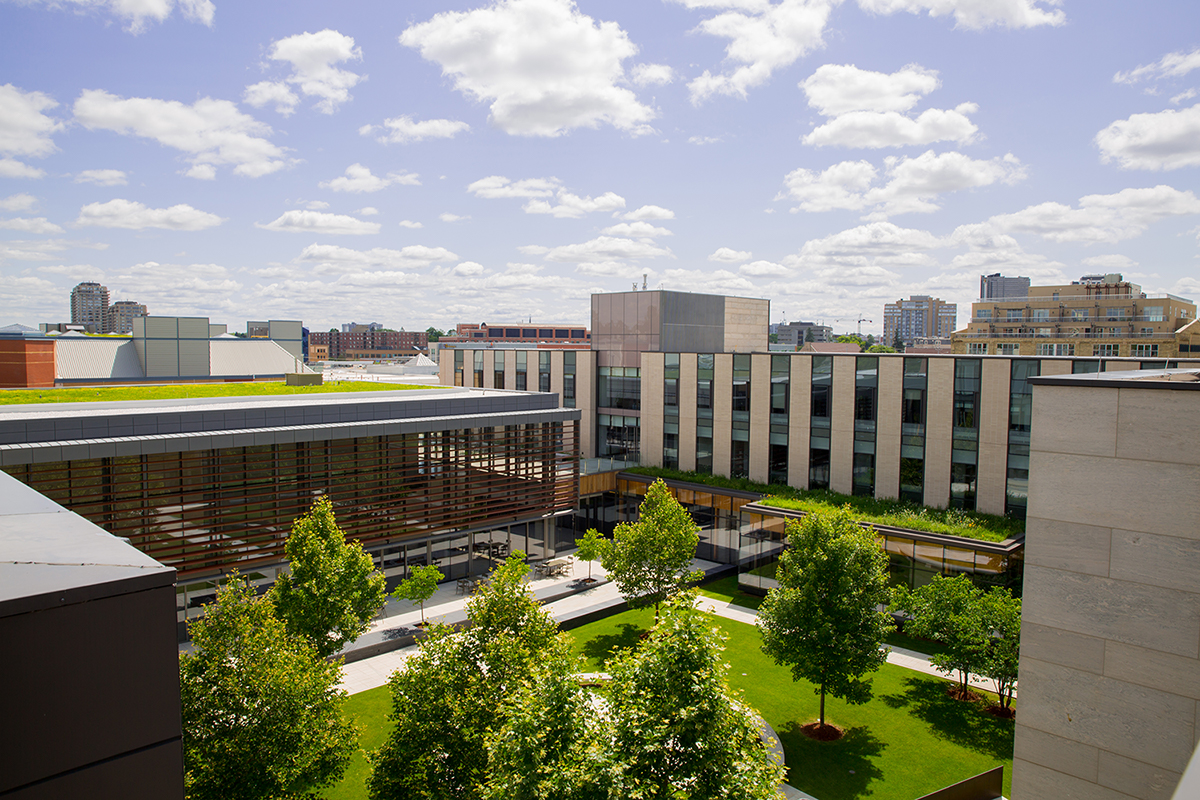
Balsillie School of International Affairs at the CIGI Campus

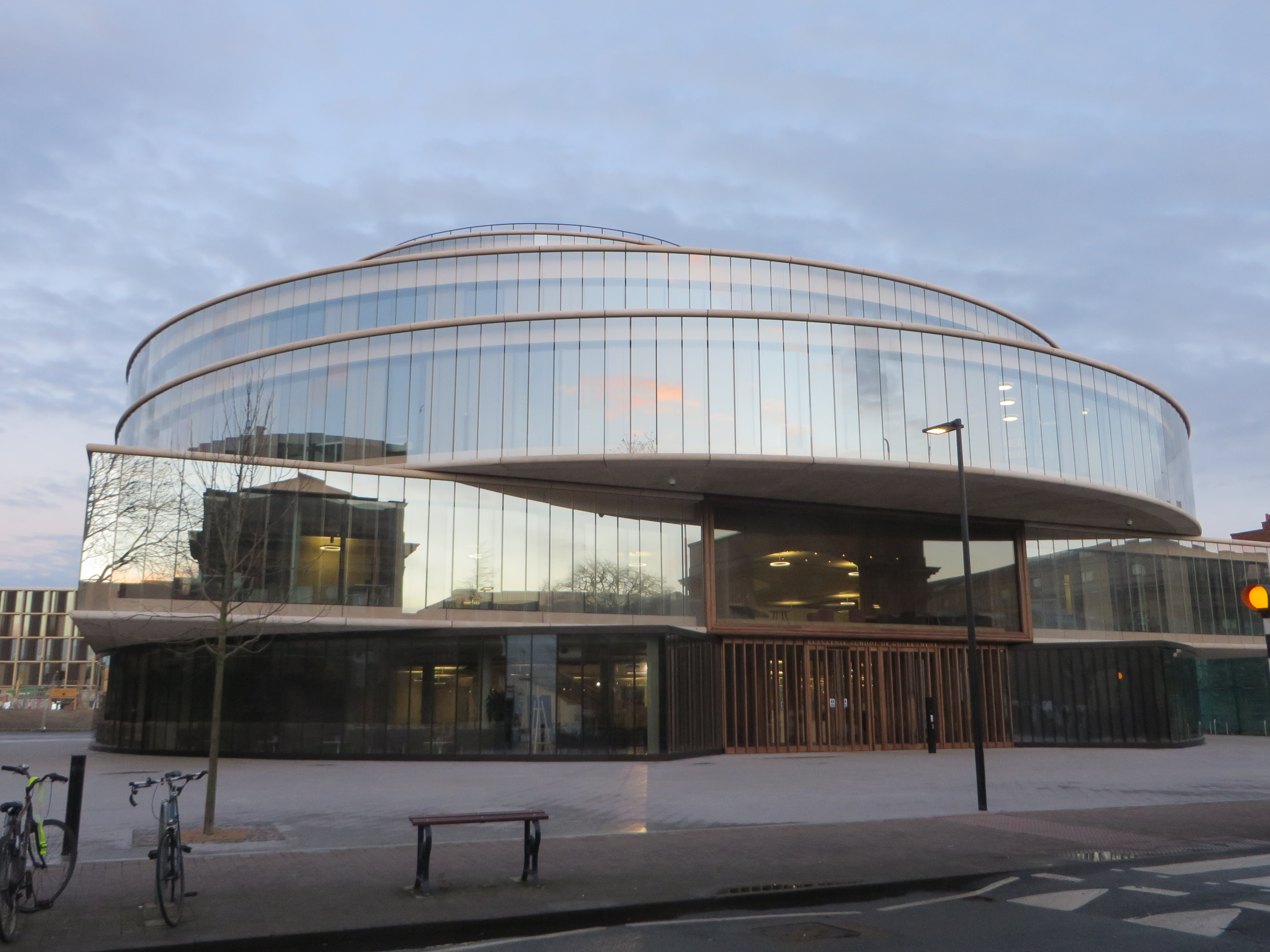
Blavatnik School of Government building

- Balsillie School of International Affairs
- Blavatnik School of Government
- Goldman School of Public Policy at the University of California Berkeley
- London School of Economics
- King's College London
- The University of Chicago Harris School of Public Policy
- Heinz College of Information Systems and Public Policy at Carnegie Mellon University
- Harvard Kennedy School of Government
- Hertie School of Governance
- Munk School of Global Affairs and Public Policy
- Norman Paterson School of International Affairs
- Paul H. Nitze School of Advanced International Studies
- Princeton School of Public and International Affairs
- Sciences Po Paris
- University of Cambridge
- University of Glasgow
- University of Warwick
- Paris Nanterre University

== Subtypes ==
- Company policy
- Communications and information policy
- Human resource policies
- Privacy policy
- Public policy
- Defense policy
- Domestic policy
- Economic policy
- Education policy
- Energy policy
- Environmental policy
- Foreign policy
- Forest policy
- Health policy
- Macroeconomic policy
- Monetary policy
- Plan
- Population policy
- Public policy in law
- Science policy
- Security policy
- Social policy and cultural policy
- Urban policy
- Transport policy
- Water policy

== Induction of policies ==
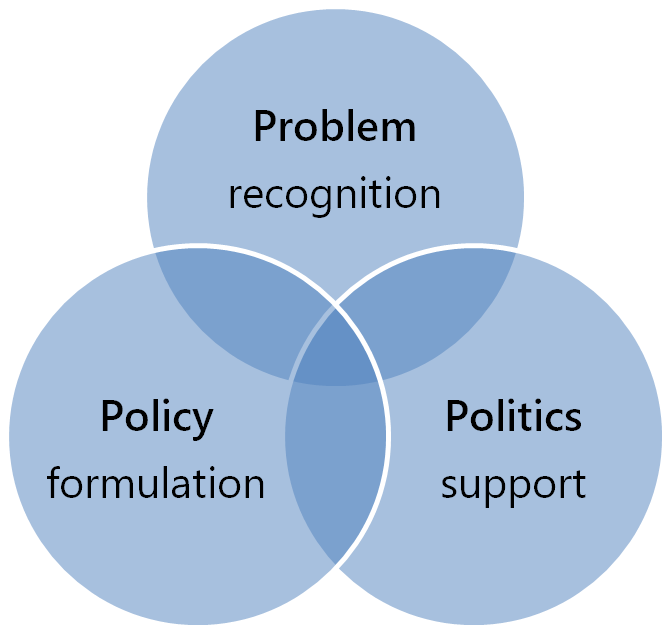
The multiple streams framework explains that policy change happens when problem recognition, policy formulation and political support align.

In contemporary systems of market-oriented economics and of homogeneous voting of delegates and decisions, policy mixes are usually introduced depending on factors that include popularity in the public (influenced via media and education as well as by cultural identity), contemporary economics (such as what is beneficial or a burden in the long- and near-term within it) and a general state of international competition (often the focus of geopolitics). Broadly, considerations include political competition with other parties and social stability as well as national interests within the framework of global dynamics.

Policies or policy-elements can be designed and proposed by a multitude of actors or collaborating actor-networks in various ways. Alternative options as well as organisations and decision-makers that would be responsible for enacting these policies – or explaining their rejection – can be identified. "Policy sequencing" is a concept that integrates mixes of existing or hypothetical policies and arranges them in a sequential order. The use of such frameworks may make complex polycentric governance for the achievement of goals such as climate change mitigation and stoppage of deforestation more easily achievable or more effective, fair, efficient, legitimate and rapidly implemented.

Contemporary ways of policy-making or decision-making may depend on exogenously-driven shocks that "undermine institutionally entrenched policy equilibria" and may not always be functional in terms of sufficiently preventing and solving problems, especially when unpopular policies, regulation of influential entities with vested interests, international coordination and non-reactive strategic long-term thinking and management are needed. In that sense, "reactive sequencing" refers to "the notion that early events in a sequence set in motion a chain of causally linked reactions and counter-reactions which trigger subsequent development". This is a concept separate to policy sequencing in that the latter may require actions from a multitude of parties at different stages for progress of the sequence, rather than an initial "shock", force-exertion or catalysis of chains of events.

In the modern highly interconnected world, polycentric governance has become ever more important – such "requires a complex combination of multiple levels and diverse types of organizations drawn from the public, private, and voluntary sectors that have overlapping realms of responsibility and functional capacities". Key components of policies include command-and-control measures, enabling measures, monitoring, incentives and disincentives.

Science-based policy, related to the more narrow concept of evidence-based policy, may have also become more important. A review about worldwide pollution as a major cause of death – where it found little progress, suggests that successful control of conjoined threats such as pollution, climate change, and biodiversity loss requires a global, "formal science–policy interface", e.g. to "inform intervention, influence research, and guide funding". Broadly, science–policy interfaces include both science in policy and science for policy.

== See also ==
- Artificial intelligence in government
- Blueprint
- Distributive tendency
- Iron triangle
- Mandate (politics)
- Multiple streams framework
- Overton window
- Pattern language
- Policy alienation
- Policy analysis
- Policy Governance
- Policy studies
- Political science
- Program evaluation
- Public administration
- Public health
- Public policy (law)
- Public policy schools
- Public services
- Social contract
- Social welfare
- Social work
- Think tank

== Bibliography ==
- Althaus, Catherine; Bridgman, Peter; Davis, Glyn (2007). The Australian Policy Handbook (4th ed.). Sydney: Allen & Unwin.
- Blakemore, Ken (1998). Social Policy: an Introduction. Buckingham; Philadelphia: Open University Press.
- Dye, Thomas R. (1976). Policy Analysis. University of Alabama Press.
- Greenberg, George D.; et al. (December 1977). "Developing Public Policy Theory: Perspectives from Empirical Research". American Political Science Review. 71 (4): 1532–1543. doi:10.2307/1961494. JSTOR 1961494. S2CID 145741414.
- Heckathorn, Douglas D.; Maser, Steven M. (1990). "The Contractual Architecture of Public Policy: A Critical Reconstruction of Lowi's Typology". The Journal of Politics. 52 (4): 1101–1123. doi:10.2307/2131684. JSTOR 2131684. S2CID 154496294.
- Jenkins, William (1978). Policy Analysis: A Political and Organizational Perspective. London: Martin Robertson.
- Kellow, Aynsley (Summer 1988). "Promoting Elegance in Policy Theory: Simplifying Lowi's Arenas of Power". Policy Studies Journal. 16 (4): 713–724. doi:10.1111/j.1541-0072.1988.tb00680.x.
- Lowi, Theodore J.; Bauer, Raymond A.; De Sola Pool, Ithiel; Dexter, Lewis A. (1964). "American Business, Public Policy, Case-Studies, and Political Theory". World Politics. 16 (4): 687–713. doi:10.2307/2009452. JSTOR 2009452. S2CID 154980260.
- Lowi, Theodore J. (1972). "Four Systems of Policy, Politics, and Choice". Public Administration Review. 32 (4): 298–310. doi:10.2307/974990. JSTOR 974990.
- Lowi, Theodore J. (1985). "The State in Politics". In Noll, Roger G. (ed.). Regulatory Policy and the social Sciences. Berkeley: University of California Press. pp. 67–110.
- Müller, Pierre; Surel, Yves (1998). L'analyse des politiques publiques (in French). Paris: Montchrestien.
- Nakamura, Robert T. (September 1987). "The textbook policy process and implementation research". Review of Policy Research. 7 (1): 142–154. doi:10.1111/j.1541-1338.1987.tb00034.x.
- Paquette, Laure (2002). Analyzing National and International Policy. Rowman Littlefield.
- Smith, K. B. (2002). "Typologies, Taxonomies, and the Benefits of Policy Classification". Policy Studies Journal. 30 (3): 379–395. doi:10.1111/j.1541-0072.2002.tb02153.x.
- Spitzer, Robert J. (June 1987). "Promoting Policy Theory: Revising the Arenas of Power". Policy Studies Journal. 15 (4): 675–689. doi:10.1111/j.1541-0072.1987.tb00753.x.
