= International Theory =

Academic journal

- Discipline: Political science
- Language: English
- Edited by: Claudia Aradau; Catherine Lu; David A. Welch

Publication details
- History: 2009–present
- Publisher: Cambridge University Press (United Kingdom)
- Frequency: Triannually
- Open access: Yes
- Impact factor: 3.3 (2022)

Standard abbreviations
- ISO 4: Int. Theory

Indexing
- ISSN: 1752-9719 (print); 1752-9727 (web)
- LCCN: 2009207508
- OCLC no.: 435529537

Links
- Journal homepage; Online access; All Issues

International Theory is an interdisciplinary peer-reviewed academic journal published triannually by Cambridge University Press, with the support of the David L. Boren College for International Studies at the University of Oklahoma, for promoting theoretical scholarship about the positive, legal, and normative aspects of world politics. The publishers state that it is intended as a forum where scholars can develop theoretical arguments in depth without an expectation of extensive empirical analysis. It was established in 2009 by Duncan Snidal and Alexander Wendt, and edited by them along with Christian Reus-Smit until March 2019. The current editors are Claudia Aradau (King's College London), Catherine Lu (McGill University), and David A. Welch (Balsillie School of International Affairs, University of Waterloo); the Associate Editor is Mark Raymond (University of Oklahoma).

According to Journal Citation Reports, the journal has a 2022 2-year impact factor of 3.30, ranking it 38th out of 187 journals in the category "Political Science" and 16th out of 96 journals in the category "International Relations", and a 5-year impact factor of 3.1, placing it 51st of 186 and 21st of 95 in these two categories respectively.

International Theory is fully open access as of 6 September 2023.
