= Alan Whiteside =

- Born: 18 March 1956 (age 70); Nairobi, Kenya
- Education: University of East Anglia; University of KwaZulu-Natal
- Occupations: Professor, Academic
- Known for: Development Economics, HIV/AIDS
- Website: alan-whiteside.com

Alan Walter Whiteside OBE (born in Nairobi, Kenya, on 18 March 1956) is a South African academic, researcher and professor at the Balsillie School of International Affairs and professor emeritus at the University of KwaZulu-Natal. He is well known for his innovative work in the field of the social impacts of HIV and AIDS.

== Education ==
Whiteside obtained a bachelor's degree in 1978, and an MA (Development Economics) in 1980, from the School of Development Studies at the University of East Anglia. He then obtained a D.Econ. from the University of Natal (now University of KwaZulu-Natal) in 2003. Whiteside joined the university as a research fellow in 1983, and in 1998 founded the Health Economics and HIV/AIDS Research Division (HEARD). He held a chair at the University of KwaZulu-Natal, where he was executive director of HEARD. Currently, Whiteside has a position at the Balsillie School of International Affairs and Wilfrid Laurier University School of International Policy and Governance.

== Career ==
Whiteside started his career as a freelance journalist and teacher in Mbabane, Swaziland, before joining the Botswana Ministry of Finance and Development Planning as an Overseas Development Institute Fellow and a planning officer/economist in 1980. He was a research fellow, senior research fellow and associate professor at the Economic Research Unit at the University of Natal, from 1983 to 1997. Whiteside was an associate and director for Capricorn Africa Economic Associates, in Mbabane, Swaziland, between 1988 and 1998. In 1998 he founded the Health Economics and HIV/AIDS Research Division (HEARD) and he was subsequently promoted to professor. He was a senior research fellow at the Department for International Development from 2009 to 2012.

In 2012 he was appointed CIGI Chair in Global Health at the Balsillie School of International Affairs.

Whiteside has written many peer-reviewed articles, and has authored several books and numerous papers relating to HIV and AIDS. Of particular importance was his 2003 paper, (with fellow academic Alex de Waal), ‘New variant famine: AIDS and the food crisis in southern Africa’, in The Lancet. Among his books are the popular ‘AIDS the Challenge for South Africa’ (with Clem Sunter, 2000), and influential academic volumes such as ‘HIV/AIDS: A Very Short Introduction’, (Oxford University Press, 2008), and 'AIDS in the Twenty-First Century: Disease and Globalization' (with Tony Barnett, 2006). Whiteside's work has encompassed lecturing, mentorship, training and frequently speaking to the media. He developed the successful ‘Planning for HIV/AIDS’ training workshop for the Overseas Development Group at the University of East Anglia. He continues to mentor and supervise many students, academics and researchers in the field. He has worked with many international donors philanthropies and the corporate sector.

Whiteside was appointed Officer of the Order of the British Empire (OBE) in the 2015 New Year Honours for services to science and strategic interventions to curb HIV/AIDS.

== Public and professional service ==
Whiteside contributes to international policy through engagement with governments, the UN system and donors. He was on the International AIDS Vaccine Initiative's Policy Advisory Committee, SIDA/Norad Regional AIDS Team Reference Group, and International AIDS Society Governing Council.

He is a member of the Waterford Kamhlaba (a United World College) Governing Council and a Trustee of the Waterford School Trust.

Whiteside is a member of the Academy of Science of South Africa

Between 2003 and 2006 he was appointed by Kofi Annan to the Commission on HIV/AIDS and Governance in Africa and is Treasurer of the International AIDS Society Governing Council

Whiteside serves on the editorial boards of several journals, including:

- Editorial Board of the African Journal of AIDS Research
- International Advisory Editorial Board of Development Policy Review
- Editorial Board of Globalisation and Health
- Editorial Board of the Journal of the International AIDS Society

== See also ==
- International AIDS Society
- James Orbinski
- Simon Dalby
