= Shohini =

Shohini is a given name. Notable people with the name include:

- Shohini Ghose, Indian-Canadian physicist
- Shohini Ghosh, Indian film director
