= Alexis McGill Johnson =

President of Planned Parenthood

Lori Alexis McGill Johnson
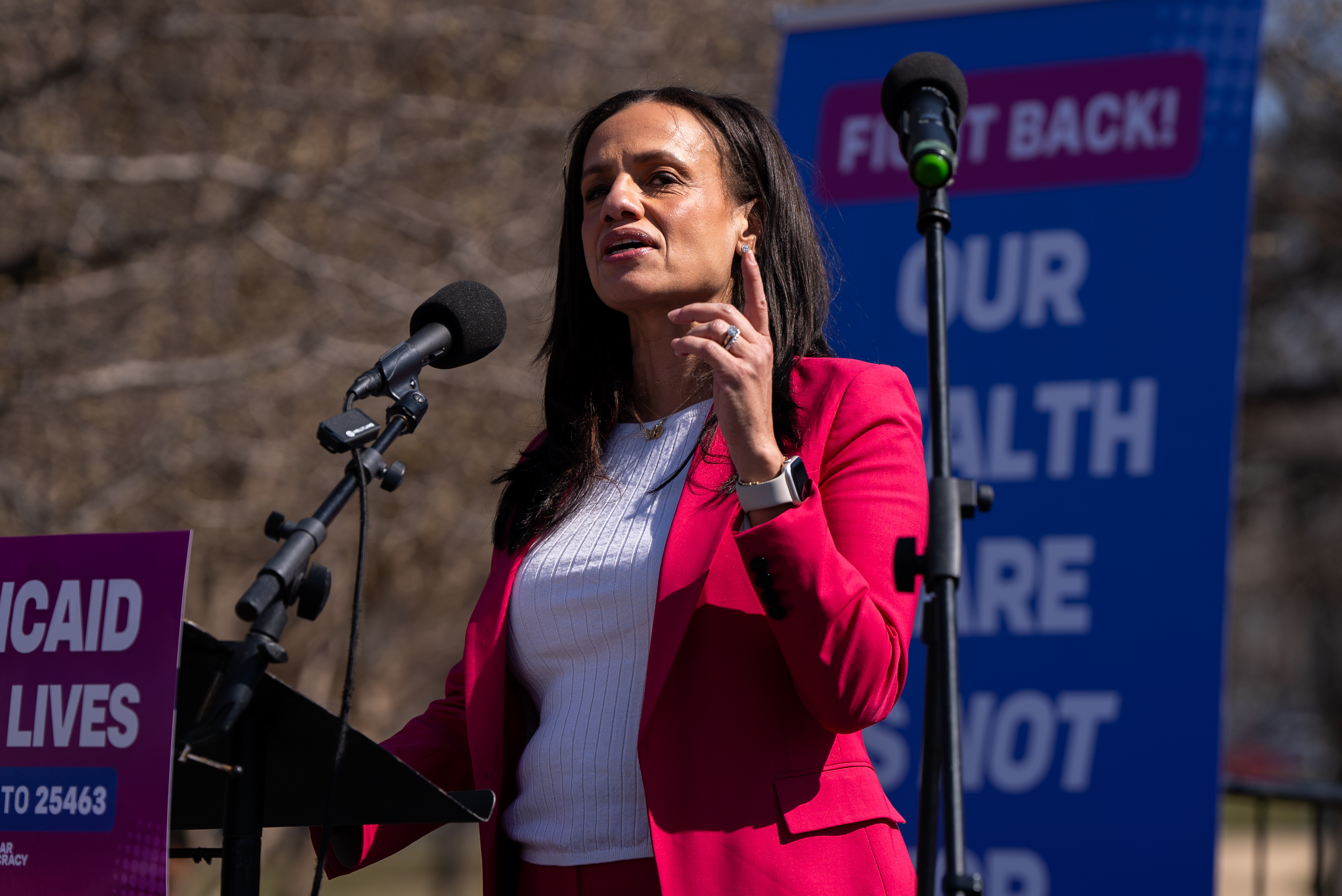
- Alexis McGill Johnson in 2025

President and CEO of Planned Parenthood
- Incumbent
- Assumed office July 16, 2019; Acting: July 16, 2019 – June 26, 2020
- Preceded by: Leana Wen

Personal details
- Born: August 5, 1972 (age 54) New York City, New York, U.S.
- Spouse: Robert Johnson
- Education: Princeton University (BA); Yale University (MA)

Alexis McGill Johnson (born August 5, 1972) is an American businesswoman and social justice advocate. She currently serves as the president and CEO of Planned Parenthood Federation of America (PFFA) as well as president and CEO of Planned Parenthood Action Fund.

== Early life and education ==
McGill Johnson was born in Morristown, New Jersey and raised by her mother and father. Her mother worked her way up from a secretary to an executive-level position at AT&T. McGill Johnson's childhood was strongly influenced by her parents' Black Nationalism and their pride in Black culture.

In 1993, she graduated from Princeton University with a bachelor's degree in political science and a focus in Latin-American social movements. She went on to receive a Master of Arts from Yale University in 1995. She is a member of Alpha Kappa Alpha

== Career ==
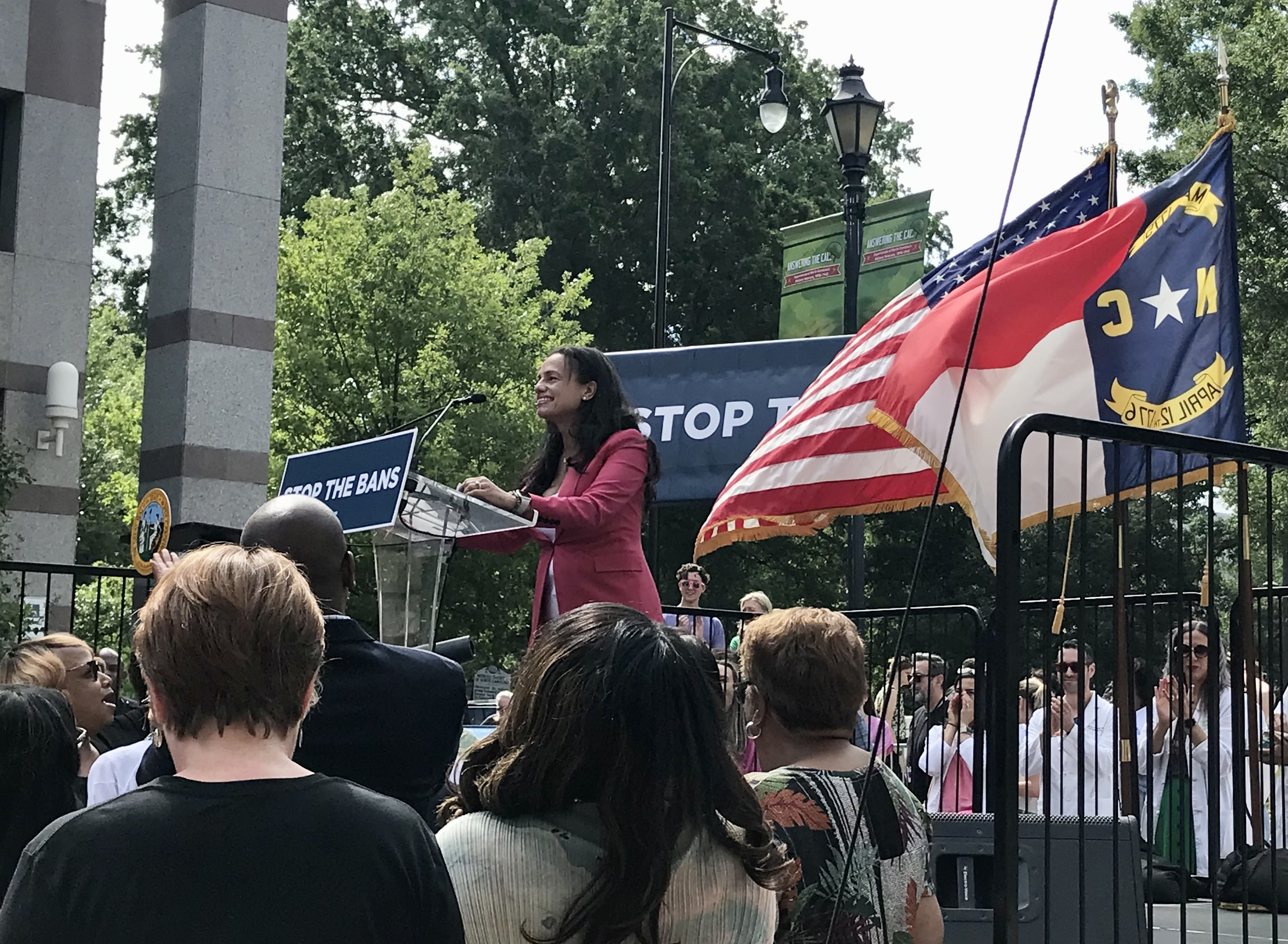
Johnson speaks at a rally against abortion restrictions in North Carolina, 2023

McGill Johnson taught political science and African-American studies at both Yale and Wesleyan University. She served as political director for Russell Simmons' the Hip-Hop Summit Action Network and was the executive director of Citizen Change during the 2004 election season, launching their "Vote or Die!" campaign.

In 2009, she co-founded and co-directed the Perception Institute (formerly the American Values Institute), a research organization focused on bias, discrimination, and identity. She served as the organization's executive director and worked on research and public education initiatives examining implicit bias and structural integrity

During her tenure, McGill Johnson worked with corporations, media organizations, and advocacy groups to develop bias-reduction strategies based on behavioral research. In 2018, she co-created the curriculum used for racial bias training at Starbucks following a widely reported incident at one of its Philadelphia stores that prompted a nationwide company training program.

She also contributed to published research on racial perception and bias, including the Good Hair Study, which examined attitudes and implicit biases regarding Black women's hair in professional and social settings. The study explored how hair texture and style can influence perceptions of professionalism, competence, and beauty, and contributed to broader public discussions about workplace discrimination and cultural bias.

On July 16, 2019, McGill Johnson was announced as Planned Parenthood's acting president after the termination of Leana Wen. McGill Johnson was previously a board member and was the board's chair from 2013 to 2015. At that time, the Perception Institute listed her as being "on leave." On June 26, 2020, she was elevated to permanent president and CEO of Planned Parenthood.

McGill Johnson also serves on the boards of Color of Change and the Leadership Conference for Civil and Human Rights. She previously served on boards of the New York Civil Liberties Union, the Center for Social Inclusion, the Citizen Engagement Lab, and the Narrative Initiative.

== Leadership of Planned Parenthood ==
Alexis McGill Johnson’s tenure as president and CEO has coincided with major changes in U.S. abortion law, including the Supreme Court’s 2022 decision in Dobbs v. Jackson Women's Health Organization, which overturned Roe v. Wade and returned abortion regulation to the states. Following the Dobbs decision, McGill Johnson led Planned Parenthood’s national advocacy and political response to expanding state abortion bans and restrictions.

Under McGill Johnson’s leadership, Planned Parenthood secured the largest gift from a single donor in the organization's history with MacKenzie Scott’s $275 million donation. She also introduced initiatives focused on addressing racial disparities in reproductive and maternal health outcomes, including a Black health equity initiative aimed at strengthening services and outreach in communities disproportionately affected by gaps in care.

== Public appearance and advocacy ==
McGill Johnson has participated in national conferences and public forums addressing reproductive health, civil rights, and nonprofit leadership. She has appeared at political and policy events in her capacity as president of Planned Parenthood. She also delivered remarks at the 2024 Democratic National Convention and participated in events with President Joe Biden and Vice President Kamala Harris focused on reproductive rights policy following the Dobbs decision.

As president of the Planned Parenthood Action Fund, McGill Johnson has overseen electoral advocacy efforts related to abortion rights. During the 2023 and 2024 election cycles, abortion-rights ballot initiatives supported by reproductive-rights groups were approved by voters in several states, including enshrining abortion rights in Ohio’s constitution via "The Right to Reproductive Freedom with Protections for Health and Safety", stopping anti-abortion legislation in Virginia, expanding reproductive-rights majorities in New Jersey, and supporting the election of a progressive state supreme court justice in Pennsylvania.

== Awards and honors ==
- Cultured Magazine, The 2026 CULT100
- Forbes 50 over 50, 2025
- National Action Network's Keepers of the Dream, 2024
- In 2024, McGill Johnson was recognized by CNN As Equals for her work as a social justice leader
- In 2023, McGill Johnson appeared in Politico's Playbook Power List for her work in wake of the repeal of Roe v. Wade
- In 2023, McGill Johnson was selected for STAT's Status List for her work in helping patients
- In 2022, McGill Johnson accepted the Clio Health Vangaurd Award on behalf of Planned Parenthood Federation of America
- In 2022, The Root named McGill Johnson as one of the 100 Most Influential African Americans
- In 2022, AdWeek honored McGill Johnson and Planned Parenthood as their Purpose Brand

== Personal life ==
She lives in New York City. She is married to Robert Johnson, who is the president of the Institute for New Economic Thinking. They have two daughters.
