= Jessen =

Jessen may refer to:

- Jessen (Elster), a municipality on the Black Elster river in Saxony-Anhalt, Germany
- Jessen (surname), including a list of people with the name
- Jessen, a typeface created by Rudolf Koch
