= Simon Dalby =

Simon Dalby may refer to:

- Simon Dalby (academic), Irish-born academic
- Simon Dalby (cyclist) (born 2003), Danish cyclist
