= Wessen =

Wessen is a surname. Notable people with the surname include:

- Elias Wessén (1889–1981), Swedish linguist
- Randii Wessen (born 1958), American astronomer

== See also ==
- Jessen (surname)
