= Centre for International Governance Innovation =

Think tank on global governance

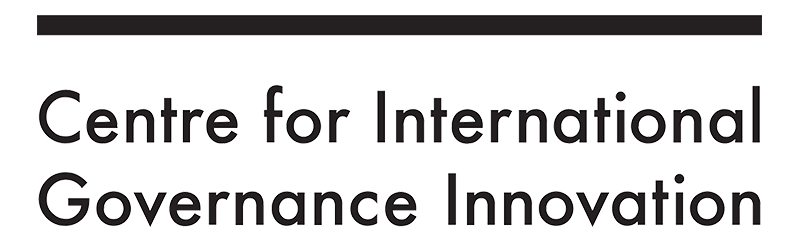

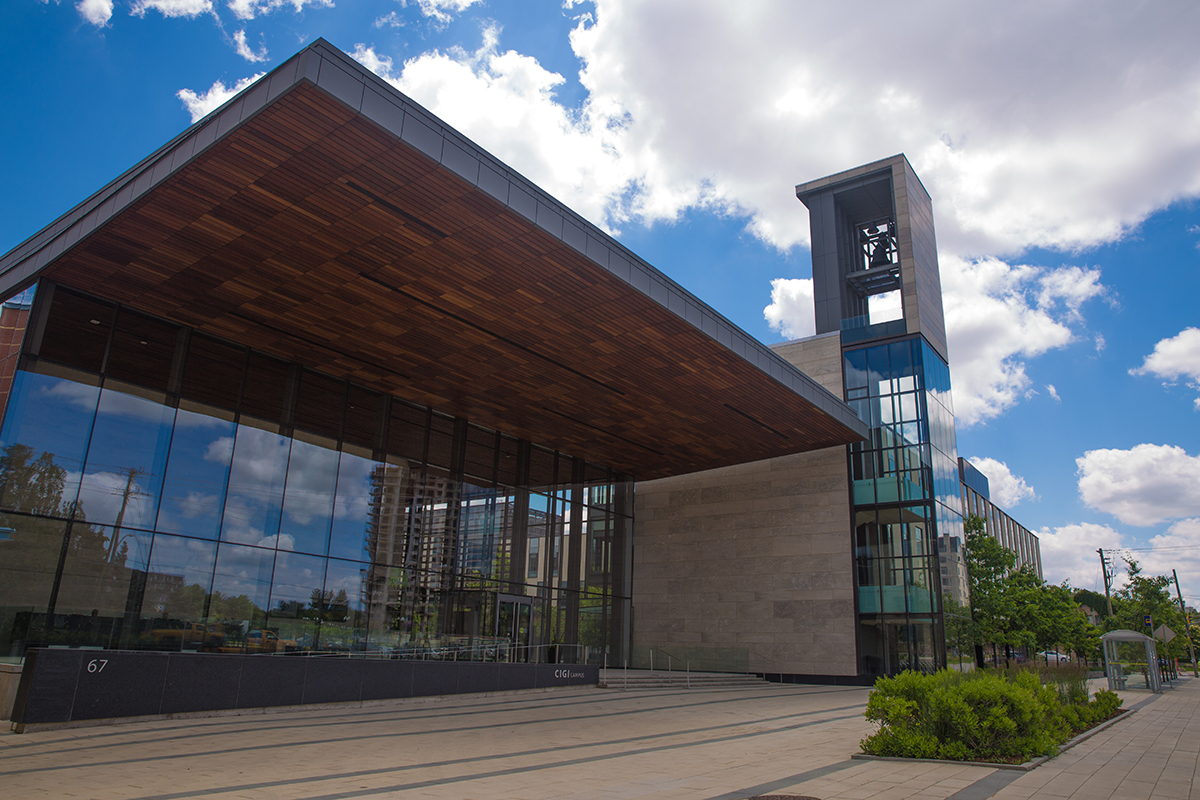
- The CIGI campus
- Abbreviation: CIGI
- Formation: 2001
- Type: International think tank on global governance
- Purpose: Generating ideas for multilateral governance improvements
- Headquarters: 67 Erb Street West
- Location: Waterloo, Ontario
- President: Paul Samson
- Website: cigionline.org

The Centre for International Governance Innovation (CIGI, pronounced "see-jee") is an independent, non-partisan think tank on global governance. CIGI supports research, forms networks, advances policy debate and generates ideas for multilateral governance improvements. CIGI's interdisciplinary work includes collaboration with policy, business and academic communities around the world.

CIGI ranked among the top 12 global think-tanks in the categories of "AI Policy and Strategy Think Tanks" and "Top Science and Technology Policy Think Tanks", and 30th globally among the "Top Thinks Worldwide" in the Global Go To Think Tank Index, 2020. In 2025, during Canada’s G7 Presidency, CIGI organized the Think7 (T7) process and hosted the T7 Summit at its Waterloo campus. T7 is the official engagement group of think tanks that provides research-based policy recommendations to the G7 Presidency.

Until September 2014, CIGI was headquartered in the former Seagram Museum in the uptown district of Waterloo, Ontario. It is now situated in the CIGI Campus, which also houses the CIGI Auditorium and the Balsillie School of International Affairs (BSIA).

== History ==
CIGI was founded in 2001 by Jim Balsillie, then co-CEO of Research In Motion (RIM) (now BlackBerry). Balsillie made an initial donation of $20 million to establish the New Economy Institute (renamed CIGI in 2002), with Mike Lazaridis, his then co-CEO at RIM, contributing an additional $10 million. The combined $30 million in funds was matched by the Government of Canada in 2003.

Among CIGI's first staff was Executive Director John English, Director of Public Affairs John Milloy and Distinguished Fellows Andrew F. Cooper and Paul Heinbecker. The first CIGI International Board of Governors meeting was held in October 2003, with early members including Jagdish Bhagwati, Joe Clark, José Ángel Gurría, and Anne-Marie Slaughter.

In 2005, CIGI published its first working paper. In 2007, CIGI partnered with the University of Waterloo and Wilfrid Laurier University to launch the BSIA. In 2009, CIGI announced plans to house the BSIA within a "CIGI Campus" that would be built alongside its headquarters in Waterloo. The resulting $69 million complex received federal and provincial funding totalling $50 million through the Knowledge Infrastructure Program and Ontario's 2009 budget. The City of Waterloo donated the land for the campus through a 99-year lease. Construction of the CIGI Campus was completed in November 2011.

The centre was downsized in 2019 when 21 jobs were cut and again in 2020 when another 11 positions were eliminated according to a news report. The Budget was reduced to $8 million from the previous $12 million. These steps were necessary because the Government of Ontario cut all funding (approximately $3.2 million per annum) in 2019. A statement from CIGI stated that it would make "meaningful changes in how we operate, including streamlined decision-making, improved strategic planning and expanded partnerships". The organization's financial report at the end of July 2019 indicated that CIGI remained well-funded with $175 million in assets.

== Leadership ==
In May 2012, Rohinton P. Medhora joined CIGI as president, after having served on CIGI's International Board of Governors since 2009. Medhora is former vice president of programs at the International Development Research Centre (IDRC). Medhora succeeded former CIGI executive director Thomas A. Bernes, who previously held high-level positions at the International Monetary Fund, the World Bank and the Government of Canada.

After a decade-long leadership, Medhora stepped down as CIGI President. Following a nine-month search, Paul Samson joined the think-tank as its fourth president on September 6, 2022. Prior to CIGI, Samson served with the Government of Canada for close to two and a half decades, holding executive positions with Finance Canada, Global Affairs Canada, the Canadian International Development Agency and the Privy Council Office. He is a former associate deputy minister with Agriculture and Agri-Food Canada.

== Research initiatives ==
While CIGI's early research focused solely on international relations and the international economy, the centre's research has since evolved and expanded. With the participation of a global network of contributors and experts, CIGI examines the governance challenges and opportunities of data and transformative technologies, including artificial intelligence (AI), and their implications for the economy, security, democracy and society. CIGI's Strategic Plan 2025–2030 focuses on innovative and impactful research in four key areas: AI and transformative technology; data, economy and society; digitalization, security and democracy; and global cooperation and governance.

== Publications ==
CIGI publishes peer-reviewed papers, essays, special reports, policy briefs and conference reports that are outputs of its research programs. These publications are available for free download on the think-tank's website and are published under a Creative Commons license. CIGI previously also published books under its CIGI Press imprint, which were the result of special projects and research by CIGI fellows and scholars. Titles included: Schism: America, China and the Fracturing of the Global Trading System; Laid Low: Inside the Crisis That Overwhelmed Europe and the IMF; Look Who’s Watching: Surveillance, Treachery and Trust Online; Complexity’s Embrace: The International Law Implications of Brexit; Reflections on Canada’s Past, Present and Future in International Law; Tug of War: Negotiating Security in Eurasia; and The Fabric of Peace in Africa: Looking beyond the State. CIGI's books were distributed globally through McGill-Queen's University Press, and were available via multiple e-book platforms.

== Partners ==
Since its inception, CIGI has partnered with other think tanks and organizations from around the world. Current partnerships include the BSIA which is a unique three-way partnership among CIGI, Wilfrid Laurier University and the University of Waterloo; the Council of Councils, a network of leading institutions from twenty-four countries, facilitating dialogue and consensus-building among influential leaders from established and emerging nations; the Datasphere Initiative to responsibly unlocking the value of data for all; IDRC has partnered with CIGI and Ipsos on a project to study online gender-based violence (OGBV) and its effects on women and members of the LGBTQ+ community, with a focus on Asia, Latin America and Sub-Saharan Africa; the Forum on Information and Democracy, an international entity led by Reporters Without Borders to implement the International Partnership on Information and Democracy; the International Economics Association, an organization dedicated to promoting mutual understanding among economists worldwide; Institute for New Economic Thinking, an organization founded by George Soros in the wake of the 2008 financial crisis; and Omidyar Network to help put theory into practice on how to measure the value and contribution of societal and private data.

== Facilities ==
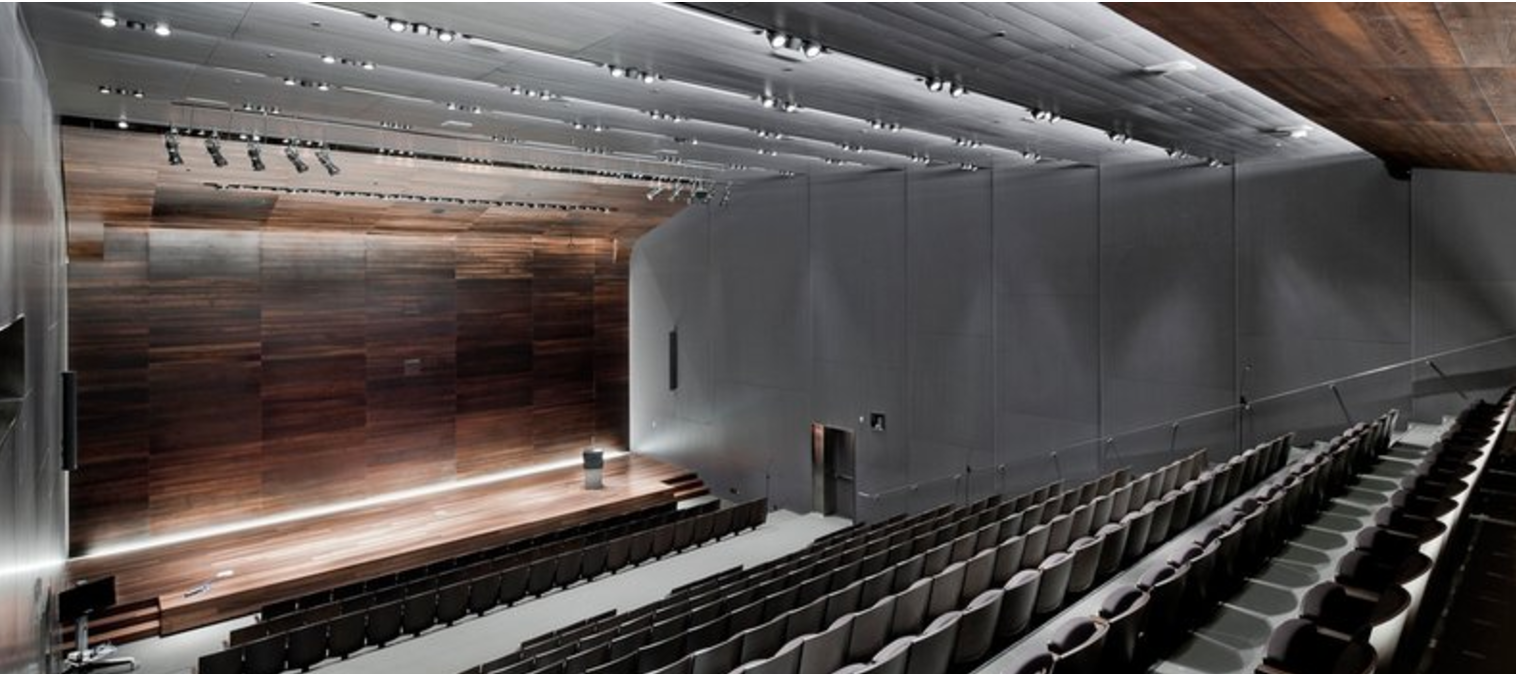
The CIGI Campus auditorium

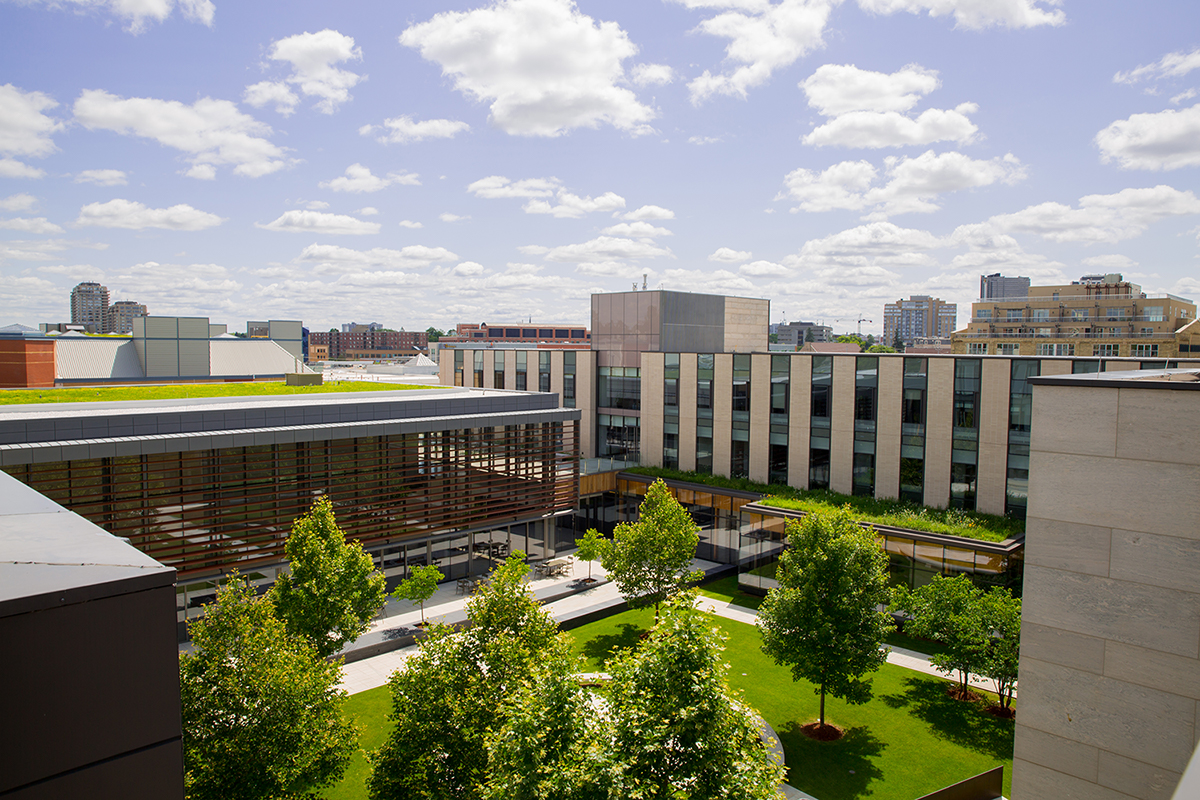
The CIGI campus

After purchasing the former Seagram Museum from the City of Waterloo, CIGI moved and started its operations from the facility in 2003 and relocated to its current campus, located adjacent to its former headquarters, in 2014. Designed by Toronto-based Kuwabara Payne McKenna Blumberg Architects, CIGI Campus is recipient of the Governor General's Medals in Architecture and other design awards. The campus also houses BSIA, main offices for staff and fellows, and provides a number of unique spaces for public events and workshops. The building also has a Broadcast Studio for interviews of experts, the CIGI auditorium, a 250-seat theatre-style space for public lectures and events, as well as a café.

== Sources ==
- https://web.archive.org/web/20110713045056/http://www.intelligentwaterloo.com/en/press.shtml
- A small place to think big. Ideas and deep pockets are transforming Waterloo
- The Future of Security Sector Reform | Security Sector Reform Resource Centre
- https://web.archive.org/web/20111027013318/http://ineteconomics.org/CIGI
