= Shohini Ghose =

Indian-Canadian physicist

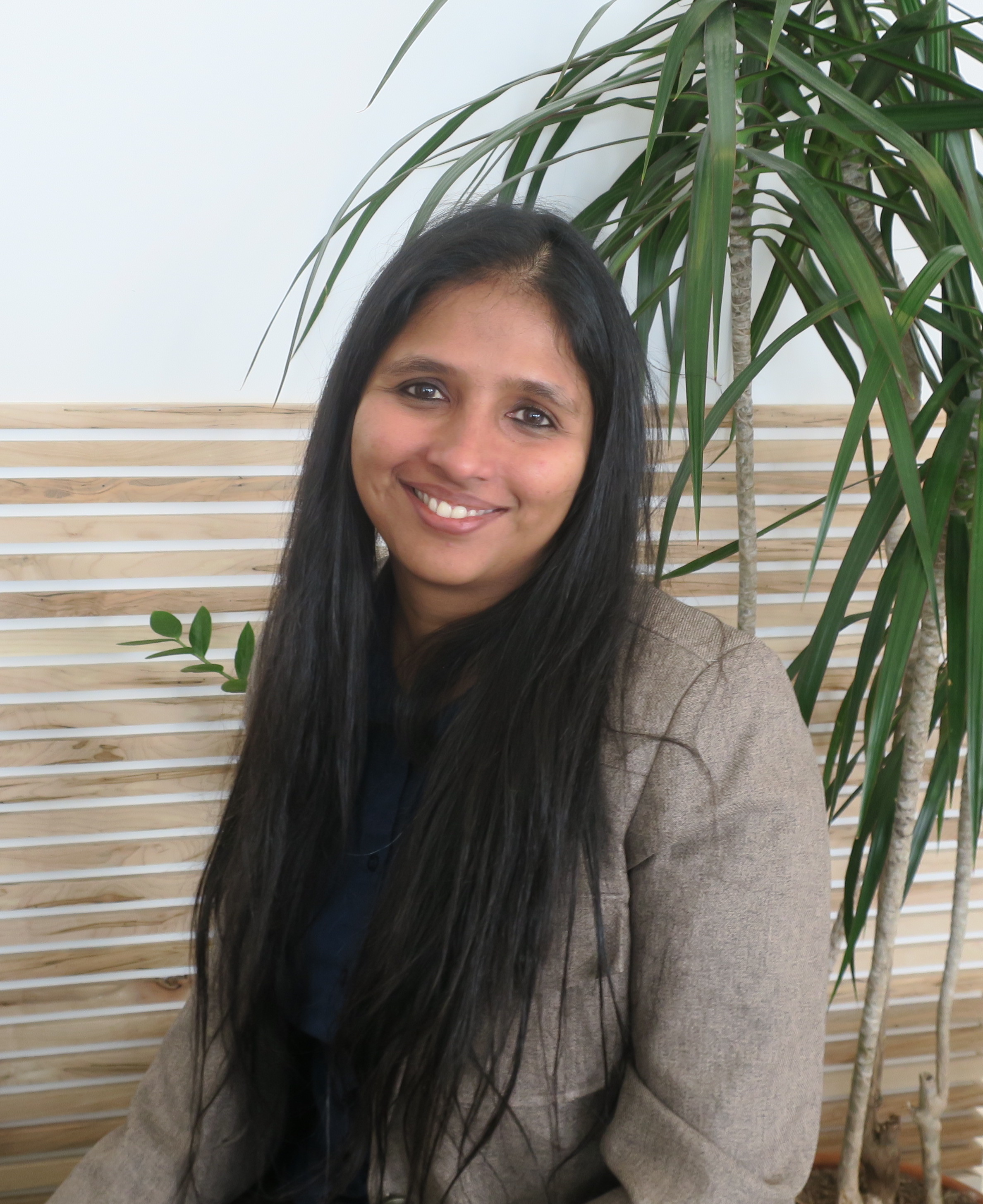
- Education: University of New Mexico; Miami University
- Scientific career
- Workplaces: Wilfrid Laurier University; University of Calgary
- Thesis: Quantum And Classical Dynamics Of Atoms In A Magneto‐optical Lattice (2003)

Shohini Ghose is a quantum physicist and Professor of Physics and Computer Science at Wilfrid Laurier University. She has served as the president of the Canadian Association of Physicists (2019-2020), co-editor-in-chief of the Canadian Journal of Physics, and the Director of the Laurier Centre for Women in Science. She was named a 2014 TED Fellow and a 2018 TED Senior Fellow. In 2019 she appeared on the Star TV show TED Talks India Nayi Baat hosted by Shah Rukh Khan. In 2017 she was elected to the Royal Society of Canada's College of New Scholars, Artists and Scientists. Her book Clues to the Cosmos was released in India in December 2019. In 2020, she was selected as an NSERC Chair for Women in Science and Engineering.

== Early life and education ==
Ghose grew up in India where she dreamed of becoming an astronaut after finding out about the first Indian astronaut in space. She moved to Miami University for her undergraduate studies, where she majored in physics and mathematics. She received her PhD in physics from the University of New Mexico in 2003. She was awarded the Chairman's award for best dissertation titled "Quantum And Classical Dynamics Of Atoms In A Magneto‐optical Lattice", which delved into the quantum chaotic behavior of atoms interacting with lasers and magnetic fields.

== Research and professional activities ==
In 2003, Ghose moved to the University of Calgary where she held an Alberta Ingenuity Postdoctoral Fellowship. After one year of postdoctoral research, she accepted a position as Assistant Professor at Wilfrid Laurier University in 2005. She continued her research in the field of quantum physics, working on quantum entanglement, chaos and tunneling. She is best known for her work with her colleague Poul Jessen's team at the University of Arizona to make the first ever observations of individual cesium atoms that showed the effect of chaos on quantum entanglement. Her research on quantum chaos was selected for the 2011 McGraw-Hill Yearbook of Science and Technology – an annual collection of breakthroughs in science and technology.

In 2012 Ghose co-authored the first introductory astronomy textbook in Canada for university students. Today her research is focused on quantum information science. She has published on the topics of quantum communication, teleportation, multiparty quantum correlations and quantum chaos. She is a Fellow of the Balsillie School of International Affairs, and is the Co-Editor in Chief (2018-) of the Canadian Journal of Physics.

In 2019, Ghose's TED talk “A beginners guide to quantum computing” was featured on TED.com. In 2014 she gave a TEDx talk at Nickel City titled "Breaking barriers with quantum physics", in 2015 "How Quantum Physics Can Help Us Fight Climate Change" in TEDxVictoria, and in 2016 "The Surprising Power of Uncertainty" at Thunder Bay. She spoke at the 2015 Smithsonian Institution Future is Here Festival on "Alice in Quantum Wonderland". She has been featured in several online science videos including on BBC and PBS Nova.

Ghose was one of few women in her PhD physics program. Her experiences led her in 2012 to found Laurier's University Research Centre for Women in Science (WinS), whose mission is to build a strong community for women in science through research, communication, and action. The Centre supports research in science and social science, provides resources and mentorship to other organizations, organizes and sponsors conferences, workshops and outreach activities, facilitates networking, and helps develop policy and actions to address structural and social barriers in science. In the WinS research exhibit #DistractinglyHonest, Wilfrid Laurier University researcher Eden Hennessey explored sexism in science. The WinS platform #MySTEMStory explores women's lives in physics. In 2015 Ghose gave a TEDx talk titled, "What if Einstein had been a woman?". In 2016 she delivered an INKTalk "Women scientists you've never heard of", and created a TED-Ed video on Marie Curie.

Ghose serves on various advisory councils and panels, and has served as a consultant to academia, industry and government on the importance of equity, diversity and inclusion (EDI) in science. She is an affiliate of the Perimeter Institute for Theoretical Physics and served as the Institute's first Equity Diversity and Inclusion Specialist from 2018-2019. She was part of the advisory team that developed the Dimensions Charter - the Canadian national charter on EDI, and spoke at the launch of the charter in 2019 with Canada's Minister of Science. She is the first Canadian member of the Working Group on Women in Physics of the International Union of Pure and Applied Physics. This group has organized the largest global surveys of the status of women in physics. Ghose is the first person of color to be elected President of the Canadian Association of Physicists (CAP). In this role she has created and chaired a standing committee to embed EDI in all activities of the CAP across Canada.

In 2020, Ghose was chosen to be one of the five Natural Sciences and Engineering Research Council (NSERC) regional Chairs for Women in Science and Engineering. A Wilfrid Laurier University press release stated that "In collaboration with her fellow chairs in Atlantic Canada, Quebec, the Prairies, British Columbia and Yukon, Ghose will lead a national and regional effort to increase the participation and retention of women in science and engineering."

In 2023, she published Her Space, Her Time: How Trailblazing Women Scientists Decoded the Hidden Universe with MIT Press, which won a SWCC 2023 Book Award.

== Awards and honors ==
Ghose has won the Wilfrid Laurier University Merit Award several times (2010, 2015, 2016, 2018) for outstanding research/teaching/service.

2004 - Alberta Ingenuity Fellowship

2011 - Shera Bangali Award

2014 - Gifted Citizen

2014 - Mahatma Gandhi Global Achievers award

2014 - Women of Waterloo (WOW) Education Award

2014 - American Physical Society Women Physicist of the Month

2014 - TED Fellow

2015 - Indo-Canadians The A List

2016 - Rogers Woman of the Year Award

2017 - Hoffman-Little Award

2017 - Inductee, Royal Society of Canada, College of New Scholars, Artists and Scientists

2018 - Faculty of Science Award for Teaching Excellence, Wilfrid Laurier University

2018 - Senior TED Fellow

2019 - Featured among 25 women from around the world in UNESCO exhibit, Paris, France: ‘Remarkable Women in Technology

2020 - Selected as NSERC Ontario Chair for Women in Science and Engineering
