= Bob Blauner =

American sociologist

Robert "Bob" Blauner (May 18, 1929 – October 20, 2016) was an American sociologist, college professor and author. He introduced the theory of internal colonialism.

== Biography ==
He was born in Chicago, Illinois. Bob spent his high school years at Sullivan High School in Chicago. He was the editor of the school paper, the Sentinel. He was also the valedictorian of his high school class. He was interested in sports and was an avid tennis player. His friends in high school included LeRoy Wollins who went on to be active in Veterans for Peace and earned his living importing Russian language materials. Another friend was Charles Garvin who taught social work at the University of Michigan and Daniel Joseph who was a distinguished professor at the University of Minnesota. Blauner's sociological writings and teachings on class, race, and men are rooted in his years as a factory worker. He took that employment after his return from France where he lived during the so-called McCarthy period. His formal studies led to a B.A. from the University of Chicago in 1948, followed by an M.A. in 1950; he earned his Ph.D. from U.C. Berkeley in 1962. His dissertation at Berkeley, which later became his first book Alienation and Freedom was supervised by William Kornhauser, Seymour Martin Lipset, and Philip Selznick. His master's thesis was on the sociological significance of first names.

He began teaching at San Francisco State University, the University of Chicago, and from 1963 on he taught at Berkeley. His first wife was his high school classmate Virginia Bauer. He had a sister Sonia. His mother was a librarian and his father was a lawyer. His wife at the time of his death was Karina Epperlein who was a noted maker of documentary films, often portraying oppressed people such as incarcerated mothers.

The well-known "Blauner Hypothesis" states that minority groups created by colonization, because it is forced on them, experience a greater degree of racism and discrimination than those created by voluntary immigration.

In his studies, Blauner contrasts the assimilation experiences of Cubans, Puerto Ricans, and Mexican-Americans.

His work was funded by major groups such as the National Institute of Mental Health, the Rockefeller Foundation, and the Social Science Research Council. He died in North Berkeley, Berkeley, California on October 20, 2016, at the age of 87.

== Bibliography ==
- Alienation and Freedom: The Factory Worker and His Industry (1964).
- Racial Oppression in America (1972).
- Black Lives, White Lives: Three Decades of Race Relations in America (1989).
- Our Mothers' Spirits: Great Writers on the Death of Mothers and the Grief of Men, editor (1997).
- Resisting McCarthyism: To Sign or Not to Sign California's Loyalty Oath (2009).
- Colonized and Immigrant Minorities

== See also ==
- Policy alienation
- Social alienation
