= Distributive tendency =

The distributive tendency is the propensity of the United States Congress to lean towards distributive politics, especially to gain political support and credit claim. Through the distributive tendency, Congress’ bills evolve over the drafting process to become more broad and reaching with their benefits. Legislation that follows the distributive tendency has benefits that flow to many districts and can come in many forms, though in current day they are often monetary.

The distributive tendency is a form of distributive politics, which is the spreading of benefits across different areas, interests, and constituencies in one piece of legislation. The term was “first coined for nineteenth-century land policies, but easily extended to include most contemporary public land and resource policies; rivers and harbors programs; defense procurement and R&D; labor, business, and agricultural ‘clientele’ services; and the traditional tariff." In fact, during the nineteenth century, a majority of policies devised by the federal government were distributive. To be considered distributive, a piece of legislation should be disaggregable, universal, and omnibus. Distributive politics is in contrast to regulatory and redistributive programs. The distributive tendency is related to distributive politics, distributive benefits, distributive policy, and distributive legislation and is closely linked with logrolling and pork barrel legislation. The distributive politics is similar to 'pork-barrel politics.'

== Characteristics of Distributive Politics ==
=== Disaggregation ===
According to many, distributive politics must be in some way disaggregable. That is, the legislation must be able to be broken down into multiple benefits dispersed among recipients and “what is being distributed can be dispensed in small units”. Lowi says distributive policies "are virtually not policies at all but are highly individualized decisions that only by accumulation can be called a policy."

=== Universalism ===
The concept of universalism also defines distributive politics. Universalism refers both to the broad allocation of benefits to recipients and the wide support these legislative measures receive in Congress. In terms of the people’s reception of benefits, universal distributive policies benefit wide ranges of people and the “unanimous inclusion of representatives’ projects in omnibus-type legislation produced by one committee.” Universalism also points to the legislative support needed to pass these distributive measures and the “coalitions of near-unanimous size rather than coalitions of narrower or minimal winning size” that pass distributive legislation. Universalism has two variants, one broad-based universalism which is more inclusive and the narrow based universalism or universalism among "own" party members or districts ruled by them. The latter kind of universalism is called particularism (see Cox and McCubbins’ universalism‐within‐party hypothesis). Weingast notes that universalism should not be taken as the sole definition of distributive politics and that “universalism is one principle among many that govern congressional behavior over distributive politics.”

=== Omnibus ===
Distributive legislation is considered omnibus and combines the small, divisible pieces that cater to many districts. This allocates funds for a collection of independent, local projects, which vary in size, scope, and dollar amount. Oftentimes, pieces of the omnibus legislation are unconnected, so “owing to the unrelatedness of issues in distributive politics, the activities of single participants need not be related but rather can be specialized as the situation warrants it.” With omnibus packages, benefits that only serve small populations are more likely to gain majority support for Congressional passage.

== Competing Theories ==
There are several competing theories on the precise definition of distributive politics, as political scientists approach the concept from different angles. The distribution and overall concentration of benefits and projects is how Lowi defines distributive politics, saying they are those that “can be disaggregated and dispensed unit by small unit, each unit more or less in isolation from other units and from any general rule.”

Ferejohn and Rundquist also accept the disaggregation as a main part of defining distribution, but they refine their definition by only including those pieces of legislation that are dispersed geographically. Ferejohn and Rundquist rely on the notion that Congressmen strive only to serve their constituents, who are part of geographically sorted voting districts. Fiorina subscribes to this same idea, noting “Congressmen understand national interest only when it speaks in a local dialect."

The role of targeted populations and recipients of distributive benefits is debated among scholars. Stockman claims that distributive policy is actually less efficient than alternatives, as it creates a widespread blanket of benefits rather than concentrating those benefits on the needy populations. Lowi and Schneider argue that distributive policies are rather more concentrated on those "powerful and positively constructed" groups, such as the elderly, business, veterans, and scientists. These groups are given more benefits because they hold less opposition and controversy and are "met instead with general approval."

Stockman argues that distributive legislation begins as a narrow bill, and expands to incorporate more projects to gain a broader support base of legislators. Stein strays away from the idea that Congressmen’s main motivation for distributing benefits is for constituent support, as he claims there is no way to fully ensure reasons for voting, and “the electoral impact of helping to direct benefits to the district will be muted to the extent that voters are unaware of the benefits and to the extent that voters do not credit their member for securing them."

Overall, these theories all accept the idea that distributive politics must in some way be disaggregable, universal, and omnibus.

== Implications ==
=== Uncontroversial Passage of Legislation ===
The combination of multiple projects benefiting multiple districts helps ensure the uncontroversial passage of legislation. In contrast to regulatory or redistributive programs, the benefits from distributive programs benefit every district. This encourages members who might have opposed a particular project, to support the distributive bill because of the benefits of a different included project in her district. A measure proposed in Congress requires so much support by many different people to pass through the legislature that it must be supported in some way by a large numbers of legislators with broad interest bases, contributing to the range of benefits included in distributive legislation and majority approval in Congress. The cost of distributive programs contributies to their uncontroversial passage and is carried by the general public not a specific group of people. This contributes to the difficulty of removing distributive programs and annual fund allocations, as legislators find it more challenging to end a program after it has been initiated and the benefits have reached their districts.

=== Political Gain ===
Allocations of distributive programs and particularized benefits are often made strategically in order to cater to a particular group and build and maintain political support for members within their districts. Distributive programs thrive on political gain because "congressmen are motivated by a desire to serve the economic interests of their constituencies." Oftentimes, the benefits are distributed geographically to match voting districts, but distribution is not limited strictly to geographic location. Other interest groups such as senior citizens and environmentalists are influential in the distribution of benefits and the support incentives of Congressmen.

== Examples ==
=== Examples of Distributive Policies ===
Modern political scholars argue that distributive policies encompass programs and grants that emphasize the general taxation distributing benefits to narrow constituencies. These include the traditional pork barrel of public works, rivers and harbors projects, highway construction, categorical grants-in-aid, urban renewal, mass transit, sewage treatment plants, model cities, and military procurement. Rivers and harbors legislation during 1889 and 1913 is a representation of distributional practices occurring in the House of Representatives over the appropriations of “oversized coalitions of districts.”

=== Examples of Non-distributive Policies ===
These distributive policies are distinguished from non-distributive programs in that non-distributive policies are often designed to serve nongeographic constituencies. The most representative example is entitlement programs targeting specific socioeconomic groups in mind, such as “the malnourished (food stamps), the unhealthy (Medicare), the poor (welfare), the retired (social security), the injured worker (workmen’s compensation), or the automobile driver (automotive product safety).

== See also ==
- Logrolling
- Policy
- Pork barrel
- United States Congress
