= Jonathan Crush =

South African professor at the Balsillie School of International Affairs

- Education: Waterford Kamhlaba; University of Cambridge; Wilfrid Laurier University; University of Cape Town (Honoris causa); Queen's University
- Scientific career
- Workplaces: Queen's University; Balsillie School of International Affairs

Jonathan Crush is a South African professor at the Balsillie School of International Affairs and a founder of the Southern African Migration Programme.

== Early life and career ==
Jonathan Crush was raised in South Africa, Swaziland and Zimbabwe. He completed his A levels at Waterford Kamhlaba United World College Southern Africa in Swaziland in 1971.

In 1972, he emigrated to England and enrolled at University of Cambridge where he obtained his degree in 1976. He then moved to Canada where he first completed his master's degree at the Wilfrid Laurier University in 1978 and then a Ph.D. at Queen's University 1983. He was a faculty member at Queen's University from 1987 to 2012.

From 1996 he became Director of the South African Migration Project (an international network of organisations founded in 1996 to promote awareness of migration-development linkages in the Southern African Development Community). In February 2005 he was awarded an Honorary Professorship at the University of Cape Town. From 2012 to present day he holds the Research Chair in Global Migration and Development at the Balsillie School of International Affairs.

Crush has published more than 160 works in a diversity of publications including The Daily Maverick.

He was interviewed by eNCA during the 2015 Growing Informal Cities conference in Cape Town.

== Selected works ==
- 1991 – Crush, Jonathan; Jeeves, Alan; Yudelman, David (1995). "South Africa's Labor Empire: A History of Black Migrancy to the Gold Mines (Review on JSTOR)". The International Journal of African Historical Studies. 28 (3): 682–684. doi:10.2307/221215. JSTOR 221215.
- 1995 – Jonathan Crush (1995). Power of Development. Ingram Digital E-books (T & F), 2008-2014. Routledge. ISBN 978-0-415-11177-5.
- 2016 – Crush, J.; Battersby, J. (2016). Rapid Urbanisation, Urban Food Deserts and Food Security in Africa. Springer International Publishing. ISBN 978-3-319-43567-1.
