= Perry Mehrling =

American economist (1959–2026)

- Born: Perry Gandhi Mehrling; August 14, 1959
- Died: October 13, 2026 (aged 67)
- Education: Harvard University (BA, PhD); London School of Economics (MSc)

Perry Gandhi Mehrling (August 14, 1959 – October 13, 2026) was an American economist, professor of political economy at the Pardee School of Global Studies at Boston University, and "father" of the Young Scholars Initiative (YSI) at the Institute for New Economic Thinking (INET). He previously taught economics at Barnard College, Columbia University, where he served on the faculty from 1987 to 2017.

Mehrling’s research focused on the theory of finance and its place within the history of economic thought.

== Background ==
Perry Gandhi Mehrling received his BA (magna cum laude) and PhD from Harvard University and his MSc from the London School of Economics. Mehrling was valedictorian of the class of 1977 at Boston Latin School. He was a professor in the Economics Department at Barnard College/Columbia University for 30 years until 2017 and was the Director of Educational Programs at the Institute for New Economic Thinking, a global not-for-profit organization dedicated to changing the way economics is currently taught. He taught the hugely popular "Economics of Money and Banking" MOOC on the Coursera website.

Mehrling died on the morning of October 13, 2026, at the age of 67.

== Publications ==
Mehrling was the author of Money and Empire: Charles P. Kindleberger and the Dollar System (2022), The Money Interest and the Public Interest: American Monetary Thought, 1920-1970, published in 1998, as well as a 2005 biography of Fischer Black, Fischer Black and the Revolutionary Idea of Finance. In the wake of the 2008-2009 Financial Crisis, there was significant interest in his 2011 book, The New Lombard Street. How the Fed Became a Dealer of Last Resort.

He wrote his thesis under Meghnad Desai and Douglas Gale at the London School of Economics. It was published by the University of Chicago's Journal of Political Economy. It synthesized differential game-theoretic models of capitalism, due to Kelvin Lancaster and Richard M. Goodwin. Gale's general equilibrium handbooks on monetary economics acknowledge Merhling's assistance.

== Money View ==
Perry Mehrling's brainchild, the "Money View," is a monetary-financial school of thought that links the (usually separate) intellectual realms of economics and finance. It offers an integrated approach for conceptualizing money, finance and (shadow) banking, which it sees as the fundamental infrastructure of capitalism. Unlike most economic theories, it assigns analytical importance to the notion of liquidity as well as to the centrality of profit-seeking dealers as market makers.

The Money View was first developed, formulated and put forward by Mehrling and has now—despite still being an academic minority view—been popularized by scholars, central bankers and market practitioners around the world.

=== Description ===
The speciality of the Money View is its ability to adequately synthesize current features of our integrated monetary and financial system, which Mehrling describes as 'money market funding of capital market lending', a.k.a. shadow banking, by paying attention to both the money market and the capital market.

The Money View includes elements of theories and insights by H.P. Minsky, Charles Kindleberger, Marcia Stigum, to name just a few.

=== Central institutions ===
Money, as a means of payment, to facilitate (final) settlement. Credit, as a promise to pay (money). Finance, to facilitate valuation of promises to pay. Banking, as a means of allocation of credit.

=== Hierarchy of Money ===
Inspired by Minsky's Hierarchy of Money, the Money View recognizes the de facto inequality of economic agents or entire countries in their capacity to issue something called money. A privileged few at the top of the hierarchy may issue money while the rest can only issue mere promises to pay money, i.e. credit (further down the hierarchy). The US dollar is at the top of the international hierarchy of money.

=== Politics ===
The Money View is inherently political. Its political dimensions are manifold and include the following:

- a direct application of the values advocated by the Enlightenment as a philosophical movement (which, inter alia, would avoid the simplifying assumptions on the nature of human beings that often prevail in economics, such as the homo economicus)
- ideas centered on reason as the primary source of knowledge
- a recognition of the "difficulty of money"
- an open rejection of equilibrium accounts of the economy (and therefore of mainstream economic thought & teaching)
- a refutation of the quantity theory of money
- critical thinking about the monetary-financial system (as opposed to proficient manipulation of formal models)
- an emphasis on liquidity as compared to solvency

=== Epistemology ===
The Money View relies on comparatively few assumptions and uses reason as the primary source of knowledge. Generally, its analytical framework is based on viewing every monetary entity in terms of its stylized balance sheet, which serves as a basic tool for asset-liability management, i.e. to measure sources and uses of funding.

The Money View has been categorized by Zoltan Pozsar as 'monetary reality' (in contrast to monetary theory) because of its reliance on balance sheets and ledger accounts.
