= Eric Helleiner =

Canadian author

Eric Helleiner is an author and professor of political science and the Faculty of Arts Chair in International Political Economy at the University of Waterloo, and a professor at the Balsillie School of International Affairs.

== Biography ==
=== Education ===
He holds a Ph.D. and M.Sc. from the Department of International Relations of the London School of Economics, and received a B.A. in Economics and Political Science from the University of Toronto.

=== Professional career ===
Helleiner has been a member of the Warwick Commission on International Financial Reform and the High Level Panel on the Governance of the Financial Stability Board. He is co-editor of the book series Cornell Studies in Money, and has served as co-editor of the journal Review of International Political Economy and associate editor of the journal Policy Sciences. Furthermore, Eric has been a Canada Research Chair and was founding Director of the MA and PhD Programs in Global Governance at the Balsillie School of International Affairs.

Helleiner has edited/co-edited a number of special issues/sections of journals on the following topics: The Political Economy of International Capital Mobility (1994), The Geopolitics of North-South Monetary Relations (2002), The Dollar's Destiny as a World Currency (2008), The Geopolitics of Sovereign Wealth Funds (2009), Crisis and the Future of Global Financial Governance (2009), and The Greening of Global Financial Markets? (2011).

Helleiner has taught courses on topics such as international political economy, globalization, global governance, politics of global finance, the state and economic life, and North American integration. His current research interests include: global financial crises and regulation, shifting power in the international monetary system, the origins of international development, and the history of IPE thought.

== Awards and honours ==
Eric Helleiner has won the Trudeau Foundation Fellows Prize, the Donner Book Prize, Marvin Gelber Essay Prize in International Relations, and the Symons Award for Excellence in Teaching.

== Publications ==
- The Contested World Economy: The Deep and Global Roots of International Political Economy. Cambridge University Press, 2023.
- The Neomercantilists: A Global Intellectual History. Cornell University Press, 2021.
- The Great Wall of Money: Politics and Power in China's International Monetary Relations. (Co-edited with Jonathan Kirshner.) Cornell University Press, 2014.
- The Status Quo Crisis: Global Financial Governance After the 2008 Meltdown. Oxford University Press, 2014.
- Forgotten Foundations of Bretton Woods: International Development and the Making of the Postwar Order. Cornell University Press, 2014.
- Global Finance in Crisis: The Politics of International Regulatory Change. (Co-edited with Stefano Pagliari and Hubert Zimmermann.) Routledge, 2010.
- The Future of the Dollar. (Co-edited with Jonathan Kirshner.) Cornell University Press, 2009.
- Towards North American Monetary Union? The Politics and History of Canada’s Exchange Rate Regime. McGill-Queen's University Press, 2007.
- Economic Nationalism in a Globalizing World. (Co-edited with Andreas Pickel.) Cornell University Press, 2005.
- The Making of National Money: Territorial Currencies in Historical Perspective. Cornell University Press, 2003.
- Nation-States and Money: The Past, Present and Future of National Currencies. (Co-edited with Emily Gilbert.) Routledge, 1999.
- States and the Reemergence of Global Finance: From Bretton Woods to the 1990s. Cornell University Press, 1996.
