= Rohinton P. Medhora =

Canadian economist

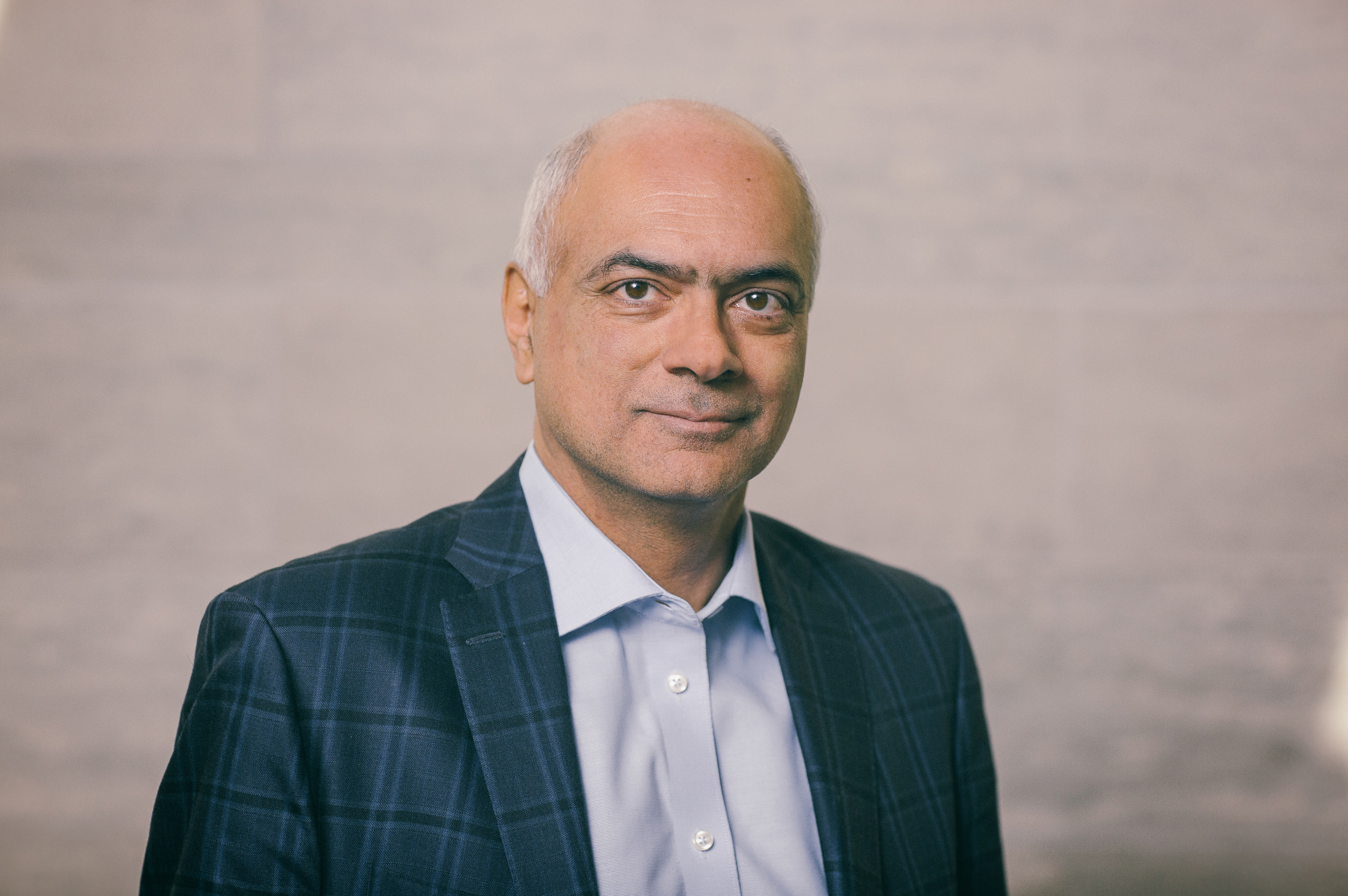
- Education: University of Toronto
- Organization: McGill University Digital Transformations for Health Lab (DTH-Lab) Centre for International Governance Innovation (CIGI)
- Title: Professor of Practice, McGill University Founding member, DTH Lab Distinguished fellow (CIGI)

Rohinton P. Medhora is a Canadian economist. He is professor of practice at the Institute for the Study of International Development at McGill University, and a former president of the Centre for International Governance Innovation where he remains a distinguished fellow. Previously, he was vice president of programs at Canada's International Development Research Centre. His fields of study are international economic relations, innovation policy, and development economics.

Rohinton sits on several non-profit boards, and was a member of the Commission on Global Economic Transformation, co-chaired by Nobel economics laureates Michael Spence and Joseph Stiglitz. He previously sat on The Lancet and Financial Times Commission on Governing Health Futures 2030 and is a founding member of its successor, the Digital Transformations for Health Lab]. In 2021-22 he chaired the Ontario Workplace Recovery Advisory Committee.

Rohinton received his doctorate in economics in 1988 from the University of Toronto, where he subsequently taught. He has published extensively in professional and non-technical journals and has produced several books including co-editing Canada-Africa Relations: Looking Back, Looking Ahead, which is volume 27 in the Canada Among Nations series and International Development: Ideas, Experience, and Prospects (Oxford University Press).

In May 2025, he produced a three-part video series on the governance of new technologies with the Institute for New Economic Thinking in New York.

== Education ==
Medhora earned his B.A. and M.A. at the University of Toronto, where he majored in economics, followed by a doctorate in economics in 1988 from the same university. His doctoral thesis is titled Assessing the costs and benefits of membership in the West African Monetary Union, 1976-84.

== Career ==
Medhora is currently a professor of practice at McGill University's Institute for the Study of International Development] and a distinguished fellow at CIGI, where he previously served as president from May 2012 to August 2022. He is also a distinguished fellow at the Koita Centre of Digital Health and the Isaac Centre for Public Policy at Ashoka University. Previously, he was vice president of programs at Canada's International Development Research Centre (IDRC).

Medhora is chair of the Board for the Institute for New Economic Thinking, vice-chair at the McLuhan Foundation, board member of Partnership for Economic Policy, the Global Centre for Pluralism, and the Musagetes Foundation. He was a member of the Commission on Global Economic Transformation. He previously sat on The Lancet and Financial Times Commission on Governing Health Futures 2030 and is a founding member of its successor, the Digital Transformations for Health Lab. He is on the advisory boards for the WTO Chairs Programme, UNU-MERIT and Global Health Centre. From 2021 to 2022, Rohinton chaired the Ontario Workplace Recovery Advisory Committee.

He has produced several books: Finance and Competitiveness in Developing Countries (2001, Routledge) and Financial Reform in Developing Countries (1998, Macmillan), which he co-edited with José Fanelli. In 2013, he was co-editor of Canada-Africa Relations: Looking Back, Looking Ahead (2013, McGill Queens university Press), which is volume 27 in the Canada Among Nations book series. In 2014, he co-edited International Development: Ideas, Experience, and Prospects (2014, Oxford University Press) and Crisis and Reform: Canada and the International Financial System (2014, McGill-Queen's University Press), which is volume 28 in the Canada Among Nations book series.

== International economic relations ==
Medhora argues that strong multilateral institutions are important for effective global governance. He points to institutions like the G20, the IMF and the WTO as examples of institutions that have the potential to make positive contributions to global well being. In this field, his publications include:

- "International Cooperation: Is the Multilateral System Helping?" CIGI Paper No. 218, June 2019.
- "The G20's "Development" Agenda: Fundamental, Not a Sidebar," CIGI Policy Brief No. 80, June 2016.
- "Refreshing Global Trade Governance," Council on Foreign Relations, January 2017.
- "Smaller Developing Countries and the G20: Ensuring their Voices Are Heard," Centre for International Governance Innovation, May 2010.
- "Will the Price Ever be Right? Carbon Pricing and the WTO", Trade, Law and Development. Maria Panezi. Vol 10, No 1, 2018.
- "Bypasses to the International Monetary Fund". Transnational Legal Theory. Vo 10, No 3-4, September 2019.
- [With Taylor Owen] "A Post-Covid-19 Digital Bretton Woods", Project Syndicate, April 17, 2020.
- [With Bob Fay], “Could the Global South G20 Presidencies spark a Bretton Woods moment for digital technology governance?”, Global Solutions Journal, Issue 8, March 2022, pp. 152–8. https://www.global-solutions-initiative.org/wp-content/uploads/2022/03/Global-Solutions-Journal-Issue-8.pdf
- [with Louise Holly and Barbara Prainsack], “Enacting a solidarity-based approach to AI and data governance”, T20 Policy Brief, Aug 2024. https://www.t20brasil.org/media/documentos/arquivos/TF05_ST_05_Enacting_a_solidari66cf66c87d5b7.pdf
- “The Lost Lessons of the Pandemic”, Project Syndicate, Sept. 8, 2023.

Medhora has argued that, in an economy increasingly driven by intangible assets, public policy should be oriented towards promoting the production of intellectual property. Along with promoting innovation, he argues that international governance frameworks are needed in order to ensure artificial intelligence and big data are deployed ethically. To address the challenges and opportunities of the new economy, Medhora has called for a “Bretton Woods moment” in which international consensus is formed around the principle that the technology-fueled economy should serve the global good. His major publications in this area are :

- "Rethinking Policy in a Digital World," CIGI Policy Brief No. 143, November 2015.
- "Data Governance in the Digital Age," CIGI Special Report, May 2018.
- "New Thinking on Innovation," CIGI Special Report, November 2017.
- "AI & Global Governance: Three Paths Towards a Global Governance of Artificial Intelligence," United Nations University Centre for Policy Research, October 2018.
- "The definition of work is about to be permanently transformed," The Globe and Mail, July 2018.
- Kickbusch, Ilona; Piselli, Dario; Agrawal, Anurag; Balicer, Ran; Banner, Olivia; Adelhardt, Michael; Capobianco, Emanuele; Fabian, Christopher; Singh Gill, Amandeep; Lupton, Deborah; Medhora, Rohinton P; Ndili, Njide; Ryś, Andrzej; Sambuli, Nanjira; Settle, Dykki; Swaminathan, Soumya; Morales, Jeanette Vega; Wolpert, Miranda; Wyckoff, Andrew W; Xue, Lan; Bytyqi, Aferdita; Franz, Christian; Gray, Whitney; Holly, Louise; Neumann, Micaela; Panda, Lipsa; Smith, Robert D; Georges Stevens, Enow Awah; Wong, Brian Li Han (November 2021). "The Lancet and Financial Times Commission on governing health futures 2030: growing up in a digital world". The Lancet. 398 (10312): 1727–1776. doi:10.1016/S0140-6736(21)01824-9. hdl:1959.4/unsworks_82772. PMID 34706260.
- “Necessity’s Child: when invention is not enough”, Literary Review of Canada, Jan/Feb 2025.

== Development economics ==
Early in his career, Medhora's work focused on development economics. During his time at IDRC, Medhora focused particularly on development finance. He argued that policy makers should avoid “cookie cutter” approaches to economic policy in developing economies. In other words, what works for one country – be it developed or otherwise – may not work in other contexts. His publications in this major area include:

- [With R. Blundell and C. Heady], "Labour Markets in an Era of Adjustment: the Case of Côte d'Ivoire", in S. Horton, R. Kanbur, and D. Mazumdar, eds., Labour Markets in an Era of Adjustment, Washington D.C.: The World Bank, 1994.
- "The Allocation of Seigniorage in the Franc Zone: the BEAC and BCEAO Regions Compared", World Development, October 1995.
- "Seigniorage Flows in the West African Monetary Union, 1976-89", Weltwirtschaftliches Archiv, September 1992.
- [With José María Fanelli] "Financial Reform in Developing Countries." Palgrave MacMillan, 1998.
- “The Uneven Build Up of Global Reserves: Ways Forward”, World Economics, October–December 2007.
- [With José María Fanelli] "Finance and Competitiveness in Developing Countries." Routledge, International Development Research Centre, 2001.
- [With David M. Malone], “Development: Advancement Through International Organizations”, CIGI Paper No. 31, May 2014.
- [With Bruce Currie-Alder, Ravi Kanbur and David M. Malone] "International Development: Ideas, Experience, and Prospects". Oxford University Press, 2014.
- [With Yiagdeesen Samy] "Canada-Africa Relations: Looking Back, Looking Ahead". McGill-Queens University Press, 2016.
- [With Dane Rowlands] "Crisis and Reform: Canada and the International Financial System". McGill-Queens University Press, 2016.
- "Policy choices in the 21st century – where to start?", Middle East Development Journal. Vo 11, No 2, 277-288, September 2019.
- “Forward: Research Addressing COVID-19 in Africa: Challenges and Leadership in a Context of Global Economic Transformation.” Institute for New Economic Thinking (INET), 2022
