= Robert Johnson (economist) =

American economist

Robert A. Johnson is the executive director of the Institute for New Economic Thinking and regularly contributes to NewDeal 2.0 with his "FinanceSeer Column." He also formerly traded currency on Wall Street under George Soros.

== Early life ==
Johnson received a B.S. in electrical engineering and a B.S. in economics from the Massachusetts Institute of Technology. Johnson received a Ph.D. and M.A. in economics from Princeton University.

== Career ==
Between 1996 and 2006, Johnson founded Bottled Majic Music, a music company, that bought Rooster Blues.

== Economic analysis ==
Johnson claims that unemployment and underemployment (idle labour resources) have led to lower tax revenues, which have led to a budget deficit problem for the USA government under George W. Bush and Barack Obama. He also cites the lack of a tax on richer Americans who have inherited wealth at birth or at a young age as another reason for this, in addition to the effects of government bailouts to large capitalist institutions in the years after 2008.

== Personal life ==
Johnson is married to Alexis McGill Johnson, who is the president of Planned Parenthood.

== Selected bibliography ==
- (As Executive Producer). Taxi to the Dark Side. Dir. by Alex Gibney, THINKFilm, 2007.
- No Change We Can Believe In: Finance is much the same as ever. Newsweek Magazine. November 5, 2009.
- What About an Additional 12.5 Billion? The New York Times. November 19, 2009.
- Robert Johnson on Resolution Austerity. The Roosevelt Institute. "Make Markets Be Markets Conference," March 3, 2010, New York City.
- Who is Influencing Obama's Budget Proposal? Following the Funders. The Huffington Post. February 15, 2011.
