= Alison Mountz =

American academic

- Born: Poughkeepsie, New York, US

Academic background
- Education: BA, Latin American and Caribbean Studies and Sociology, Dartmouth College; MA, geography, Hunter College; PhD, geography, 2003, University of British Columbia
- Thesis: Embodied geographies of the nation-state: an ethnography of Canada's response to human smuggling. (2003)

Alison Mountz is an American political geographer. She is a full professor and Canada Research Chair at the Balsillie School of International Affairs. In 2016, Mountz was elected a member of the Royal Society of Canada's College of New Scholars, Artists, and Scientists.

== Early life and education ==
Mountz was born to Robert and Henrietta Mountz in Poughkeepsie, New York. She attended Poughkeepsie High School and competed on their tennis team. As a senior, she won the 1990 Conference II League B Single Championship.

Upon graduating from high school, Mountz completed her Bachelor of Arts degree in Latin American and Caribbean studies and sociology at Dartmouth College. Following this, she earned her Master's degree in geography from Hunter College and her PhD from the University of British Columbia.

== Career ==
Upon completing her PhD, Mountz became an assistant professor in geography at the Maxwell School of Citizenship and Public Affairs. In this role, she said she wished to focus on the "social/cultural geography of transnational migration, feminist geography, urban geography, and qualitative methodology." During the 2008–09 academic year, Mountz was promoted to the role of associate professor and earned a five-year National Science Foundation Career Grant for her project "Geographies of Sovereignty: Global Migration, Legality, and the Island Index." This research formed the basis of her book Seeking Asylum: Human Smuggling and Bureaucracy at the Borders, which received the Meridian Book Award from the American Association of Geographers.

Prior to joining the Balsillie School of International Affairs at Wilfrid Laurier University (WLU), Mountz spent two years as the William Lyon Mackenzie King Chair at Harvard University. Upon joining the faculty at WLU as the Canada Research Chair in Global Migration, Mountz was elected a member of the Royal Society of Canada's College of New Scholars, Artists, and Scientists for being "on the forefront of academic research into vexing questions of human security and enforcement at the border by the nation state." Her Canada Research Chair was renewed in 2017 for an additional five years to allow her to study the global search for asylum among migrants detained on islands off the shores of Australia, Europe and the United States. She and Jennifer Loyd co-authored Boats, Borders, and Bases: Race, the Cold War, and the Rise of Migration Detention in the United States based on this research.

During the COVID-19 pandemic, Mountz's third book was published; The Death of Asylum: Hidden Geographies of the Enforcement Archipelago. It received the 2020 AAG Globe Book Award for Public Understanding of Geography for being "an important, timely and critical intervention in debates over the deadly curtailment of refugee rights globally."

== Selected publications ==
- Seeking Asylum: Human Smuggling and Bureaucracy at the Borders (2010)
- Boats, Borders, and Bases: Race, the Cold War, and the Rise of Migration Detention in the United States (with Jennifer Loyd; 2018)
- The Death of Asylum: Hidden Geographies of the Enforcement Archipelago (2020)
- Let Geography Die: Chasing Derwent's Ghost at Harvard (with Kira Williams; 2025)
