= Andrew F. Cooper =

Canadian political scientist

Andrew Fenton Cooper
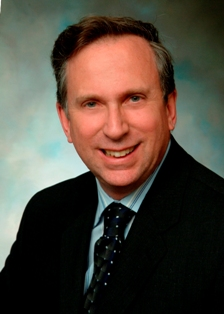
- Cooper in 2009

Academic work
- Discipline: political science
- Institutions: University of Waterloo, Waterloo, Ontario, Canada; Balsillie School of International Affairs; Centre for International Governance Innovation
- Website: andrewfcooper.com

Andrew Fenton Cooper is a professor of political science at the University of Waterloo, in Waterloo, Ontario, in Canada. He also teaches at the Balsillie School of International Affairs, also in Waterloo, and was a fellow of the Centre for International Governance Innovation on the same campus.

He is the author of The BRICS: A Very Short Introduction, in the Very Short Introductions series published by the Oxford University Press, and was the lead editor of The Oxford Handbook of Modern Diplomacy, published by the same press in 2015.
