= David A. Welch =

Canadian political scientist

- Born: 1960 (age 65–66)
- Known for: international security, foreign policy analysis, political psychology, international relations theory

Academic background
- Education: Harvard University, University of Toronto

Academic work
- Institutions: Balsillie School of International Affairs, University of Waterloo
- Website: www.balsillieschool.ca/people/david-welch/

David Andrew Welch (born 1960) is a Canadian political scientist. He is a university research chair and professor of political science at the Balsillie School of International Affairs of the University of Waterloo in Waterloo, Ontario, Canada.

== Books ==
- Justice and the Genesis of War, Cambridge University Press, 1993, ISBN 0-521-44462-4.
- Painful Choices: A Theory of Foreign Policy Change, Princeton University Press, 2005, ISBN 0-691-12340-3.
- (with Joseph Nye) Understanding Global Conflict and Cooperation: An Introduction to Theory and History, 10th ed., Pearson Longman, 2016, ISBN 0-134-40316-9).
- Security: A Philosophical Investigation, Cambridge University Press, 2022, ISBN 9781009270120.

== Honours ==
- Order of the Rising Sun, 3rd Class, Gold Rays with Neck Ribbon (2026)
