= James W. St. G. Walker =

Canadian historian (born 1940)

James W. St.G. Walker FRSC CM (born August 5, 1940) is a Canadian professor of history at the University of Waterloo, and a historian of human rights and racism.

== Biography ==
Walker received his PhD from Dalhousie University in 1973. His publications have focused on the history of Black Nova Scotians, racism in Canada, the Holocaust, and civil society. He created the first courses in African-Canadian history offered at a Canadian university.

His first major work, The Black Loyalists: The Search for a Promised Land in Nova Scotia and Sierra Leone, was based on his doctoral dissertation and first published in 1973. It has since been republished by University of Toronto Press in 1992 and again in 2017.

As a student, he served as a CUSO volunteer in India, and with "Friends of SNCC" in Toronto. While at the University of Dalhousie, co-founded and taught the "Transition Year Program" for African-Canadian and First Nations students there.

== Awards ==
In 2003–2004, Social Science and Humanities Research Council appointed Walker the Bora Laskin National Fellow in Human Rights Research.

Walker was elected a Fellow of the Royal Society of Canada in 2013, and a Member of the Order of Canada in 2016.

== Selected bibliography ==
- Burnley "Rocky" Jones : revolutionary : an autobiography, Fernwood Publishing, 2016.
- "Claiming Equality for Canadian Jewry: The Struggle for Inclusion, 1933-1945," in Ruth Klein, ed., Nazi Germany - Canadian Responses: Confronting Antisemitism in the Shadow of War, McGill-Queen's University Press, 2012.
- "Race," Rights and the Law in the Supreme Court of Canada: Historical Case Studies, The Osgoode Society and Wilfrid Laurier University Press, 1997
- Racial discrimination in Canada: the Black experience, Canadian Historical Association, 1985.
- The Black Loyalists: The Search for a Promised Land in Nova Scotia and Sierra Leone, Longman and Dalhousie University Press, 1976 (1992, 2017).
