= Institute for New Economic Thinking =

New York-based economic think tank

- Formation: October 2009
- Founder: James Balsillie, William H. Janeway, George Soros, Robert Johnson
- Type: Think tank
- Legal status: 501(c)(3) research and education nonprofit organization
- Headquarters: New York City, United States
- Fields: Macroeconomics, post-Keynesianism, pluralism
- President: Robert Johnson
- Chairman of the Governing Board: Rohinton P. Medhora
- Affiliations: University of Cambridge
- Revenue: $430,000 (2024)
- Expenses: $5.8 million (2024)
- Website: ineteconomics.org

The Institute for New Economic Thinking (INET) is a New York City-based nonprofit think tank focused on promoting post-Keynesian economics and pluralism in economics. It was founded in October 2009 as a result of the Great Recession (2007–2009), and runs a variety of affiliated programs at major universities such as the Cambridge-INET Institute at the University of Cambridge, and INET Oxford at the University of Oxford. It also has offices in London.

INET generally leans left-wing or progressive, working with economists of various leanings, including post-Keynesian, New Keynesian, Modern Monetary Theory, and Marxian schools of economic thought.

== History ==
INET was founded with an initial pledge of $50 million from businessman and philanthropist George Soros, with co-founders William Janeway and James Balsillie. It was launched at Cambridge King's College as a tribute to alumnus John Maynard Keynes.

== Affiliates ==
In November 2010, INET announced that about $7 million would be provided for the inaugural round of grants. Another four task groups tled by INET advisory board members were awarded more than $3 million in grants in 2010. One of these awards was to Steven Pincus of Yale and James Robinson of Harvard for research on the origins of the British Industrial Revolution. In 2011, $4 million in grants from INET and the Centre for International Governance Innovation (CIGI) was divided among 29 recipients. The institute has disbursed approximately $4 million annually in research grants to students and professors.

The Cambridge-INET Institute (co-funded with William H. Janeway) established an advanced institute for economic thinking at the University of Cambridge, The Cambridge-INET Institute was endowed with a $3.75 million grant from INET that was matched with an additional $3.75 million grant from the Keynes Fund for Applied Economics, Isaac Newton Trust, Mohammed El Erian, the Cambridge Endowment for Research in Finance, and the University of Cambridge Faculty of Economics. Professor Sanjeev Goyal held the position of inaugural director of Cambridge-INET. In January 2011, INET partnered with the Centre for International Governance Innovation to support research in economic theory and innovative projects. On 1 August 2021, the Cambridge INET moved and became a part of the Faculty of Economics at the new Janeway Institute Cambridge.

Similar collaborations exist with the INET at the Oxford Martin School, co-funded by James Martin in 2012, as well as the INET Center on Imperfect Knowledge Economics (IKE) at the University of Copenhagen. INET Oxford works with scholars from the University of Oxford as well as the Saïd Business School, the Department of International Development, the Department of Mathematics and the Department of Economics.

In November 2013, INET provided a $250,000 grant to the University College London for the establishment of its Center for the Study of Decision-Making Uncertainty. It also agreed to match 50% on top of the total raised from other donors.

== Programs and projects ==
Research programs supported by INET include:

- INET Grant program to support researchers who challenge economic orthodoxy and help develop new paradigms in the discipline.
- Lecture series with economists and thinkers including Michael Sandel, William Janeway, Perry Mehrling, and others
- The Human Capital and Economic Opportunity Global Working Group, headed by James Heckman, is affiliated with the Becker Friedman Institute for Research in Economics at University of Chicago.
- INET Young Scholars Initiative (YSI) inaugurated in 2012 at INET's "Paradigm Lost" conference in Berlin.

== Leadership ==
The INET executive director is Robert Johnson, former managing director at the Soros Fund Management and Moore Capital Management hedge funds.

== See also ==
- Economic history
- Heterodox economics
- Economic sociology
- Political economy
- History of economic thought
- Post-Keynesian economics
