= Policy alienation =

Government framework

Policy alienation refers to a framework which examines the experiences of governmental employees with new policies they have to implement. It has been used to describe the experiences of front-line public professionals with new policies. It is defined "as a general cognitive state of psychological disconnection from the policy programme being implemented."

== Introduction ==
A number of examples can clarify the concept of policy alienation. For example, Bottery (1998:40), examining the pressures on professionals stemming from new policies in education and health care in Great Britain, cites a teacher arguing that: "The changes have been outrageous, and have produced a culture of meritocracy and high flyers. There's massive paperwork because the politicians don't believe teachers are to be trusted." This indicates that professionals had difficulties identifying with the policies they had to implement. A second example refers to the introduction of a new reimbursement policy in mental healthcare in the Netherlands. In one large-scale survey, as many as nine out of ten professionals wanted to abandon this new policy (Palm et al., 2008). Psychologists even went as far as to openly demonstrate on the street against this policy. A major reason for this was that many could not align their professional values with the content of the policy. As one professional noted:

"Within the new healthcare system economic values are dominant. Too little attention is being paid to the content: professionals helping patients. The result is that professionals become more aware of the costs and revenues of their behavior. This comes at the expense of acting according to professional standards."

Overall, a number of studies show an increasing discontent among public professionals toward public policies (see also Hebson et al., 2003; White, 1996), although more positive experiences can also be found (Ruiter, 2007). The policy alienation framework was developed to better understand the experiences of front-line public professionals with new policies.

== Effects of policy alienation ==
Currently, there is an intense debate concerning professionals in the public sector. Many of the pressures that professionals face are related to the difficulties they have with the policies they have to implement. When implementers are unable to identify with a policy, this can negatively influence policy effectiveness. Furthermore, a high degree of policy alienation can affect the quality of interactions between professionals and citizens, which may eventually influence the output legitimacy of government. The policy alienation framework is used to analyze this topic. It has been shown that policy alienation increases resistance to a new policy, lowers behavioral support for the policy and decreases job satisfaction of public professionals. Hence, it has both influences on the individual professional, as well as on policy effectiveness.

== Conceptualization ==
Alienation broadly refers to a sense of social estrangement, an absence of social support or meaningful social connection. Sociologists, public administration scholars, and other social scientists have used the alienation concept in various studies. As a result, a number of meanings have been attributed to the term. In an attempt to provide clarity, Seeman broke these meanings down into five alienation dimensions: powerlessness, meaninglessness, normlessness, social isolation, and self-estrangement.

Many scholars have used these dimensions to devise operational measures for alienation so that they can examine the concept in a range of settings. Mau, for example, used four dimensions in examining student alienation. Rayce et al., when investigating adolescent alienation, used three of the five dimensions. Further, many other researchers have used Seeman's classification in examining the concept of work alienation. Blauner devised operational measures for three of the dimensions: powerlessness, meaninglessness, and social isolation.

The policy alienation framework was conceptualized based on the works of sociologists such as Hegel, Marx, Seeman, and Blauner. Furthermore, works of public administration scholars were used, particularly on Lipsky (street-level bureaucracy). Like work alienation, policy alienation is multidimensional, consisting of policy powerlessness and policy meaninglessness dimensions. In the work alienation literature, the dimensions of powerlessness and meaninglessness are also considered very important.

In essence, powerlessness is a person's lack of control over events in their life. In the realm of policy formulation and implementation, policy powerlessness relates to the degree of influence public professionals have over shaping a policy program. Powerlessness can occur when a new policy is drafted without the help of the professionals, by for example not consulting their professionals associations or labor unions. Furthermore, on an operational level professionals can feel powerless when they have to adhere to tight procedures and rules when implementing a policy (see also Lipsky). This kind of powerlessness may be particularly pronounced in professionals whose expectations of discretion and autonomy contradict notions of bureaucratic control (see also Profession).

The second dimension of policy alienation is meaninglessness. In the realm of policy making and implementation, policy meaninglessness refers to a professional's perception of the contribution that the policy makes to a greater purpose, most notably to society or to their own clients. For instance, a professional can feel that implementing a policy is meaningless, if it does not deliver any apparent beneficial outcomes for society, such as more safety on the streets.

To make the dimensions more specific, five sub-dimensions were identified: strategic, tactical and operational powerlessness, societal and client meaninglessness. This is shown in the table below.

Five sub-dimensions of policy alienation

Sub-dimension	Definition	Example of high scores
Strategic powerlessness	The perceived influence of the professionals on decisions concerning the content of the policy, as is captured in rules and regulations	A professional recognizing that the policy is drafted without the help of implementing professionals or professional associations.
Tactical powerlessness	The professionals' perceived influence on decisions concerning the way policy is implemented within their own organization.	Professionals stating that the managers in the organization did not consult them or their colleagues when designing the implementation process for the policy.
Operational powerlessness	The perceived degree of freedom in making choices concerning the sort, quantity and quality of sanctions and rewards on offer when implementing the policy.	Answering 'fully agree' to a survey question on whether the professional recognizes that their autonomy during the implementation process was lower than it should be.
Societal meaninglessness	The perception of professionals concerning the added value of the policy to socially relevant goals.	Stating in an interview that "I agree with the policy goal of enhancing transparency, but I do not see how this policy helps in achieving this goal."
Client meaninglessness	The professionals' perceptions of the added value of their implementing a policy for their own clients.	A professional who argues that a particular policy seriously impinges on their clients' privacy.

== See also ==
- Anomie
- Marx's theory of alienation
- Political apathy
- Social comparison theory
- Public management
