= Jessen (surname) =

Jessen (/ˈjɛsən/) is a Danish patronymic surname, literally meaning son of Jes, which is a short form of Jens (equivalent of biblical Ioanne (English: John)) from Schleswig. Notable people with the surname include:

- Børge Jessen (1907–1993), Danish mathematician
- Bruce Jessen (born 1949), American psychologist and creator of torture techniques used on CIA detainees
- Carl Wilhelm Jessen (1764–1823), Danish Naval Officer
- Christian Jessen (born 1977), British television presenter
- Ernie Jessen (1905–1987), American football player
- Gene Nora Jessen, American aviator and part of Mercury 13
- Gianna Jessen (born 1977), American recording artist and anti-abortion activist
- Ida Jessen (born 1964), Danish author
- Jakob Jessen (born 2004), Danish footballer
- Jens Jessen (born 1967), Danish footballer
- Karl Jessen (1852–1918), Russian admiral during the Russo-Japanese War
- Knud Jessen (1884–1971), Danish botanist and geologist
- Leon Jessen (born 1986), Danish footballer
- Poul S. Jessen, Danish-American optical physicist
- Poul Jessen (1926–2015), Danish gymnast
- Sandra Jessen (born 1995), Icelandic footballer
