= Critical accounting policy =

Accounting involving significant judgment and materially affecting financial statements

In public corporate finance, a "critical accounting policy" is a policy of a firm or industry that is considered to have a notably high subjective element and that has a material impact on the organization's financial statements. Such policies are often mandated to be described in detail in specific sections of a company's annual or quarterly reports. Adopting specific accounting policies and procedures (such as Sarbanes–Oxley) is one method organizations use to ensure adequate controls and transparency in financial reporting and minimize the risk of fraud.

Many accounting policies necessarily involve the subjective valuation of different items in order to give observers the best possible "snapshot" of a company's finances by looking at a single balance sheet or profit and loss statement. For example, a bank that has just made a lot of new loans would look good on one report, but if many of those borrowers later failed to repay, then a subsequent report would look very bad. So generally accepted accounting principles (GAAP) would require the bank management (and not the accountants) to estimate how many borrowers would fail to repay and to include those losses alongside the new loans. While there are many situations common to almost all companies where management must make subjective accounting entries, critical accounting policies are often those particular to an industry or company and are judged to be even more subjective than normal.

One of the key reasons many investors and analysts pay attention to critical accounting policies is that their subjective nature is believed to be ripe for abuse through creative accounting, especially slush fund accounting. In slush fund accounting, excess earnings from a good quarter or year are hidden by changing the subjective element of a critical accounting policy. The "hidden funds" can then be put back into the reported profit in a bad quarter. Companies do this because of the general belief that the ideal company is one that consistently and smoothly increases earnings. For example, a clothing store does not show the profit on all the sales it made in the current quarter because it knows that some of those clothes will be returned later and it will have to give back the money. To smooth earnings, in a good quarter, managers can say that they believe that the amount of return will be high. Then, when they have a bad quarter, they can say that they overestimated the value of returns and add the surplus back into that quarter's profit.

== Examples ==
Some examples of critical accounting policies are:

- A clothing retailer accounts for inventory, taking into consideration the fact that a rough balance of sizes is necessary for any particular piece of clothing on the sales floor.
- bank's accounting for future unpaid loans
- A manufacturer or a store accounting for future returned items
- Mortgage companies accounting for mortgage servicing rights
- The estimate of bad debts
- Accounting for the value of derivatives
- Selecting an appropriate rate and method of depreciation for fixed assets
