= CIGI Campus =

Hub of academic study and research

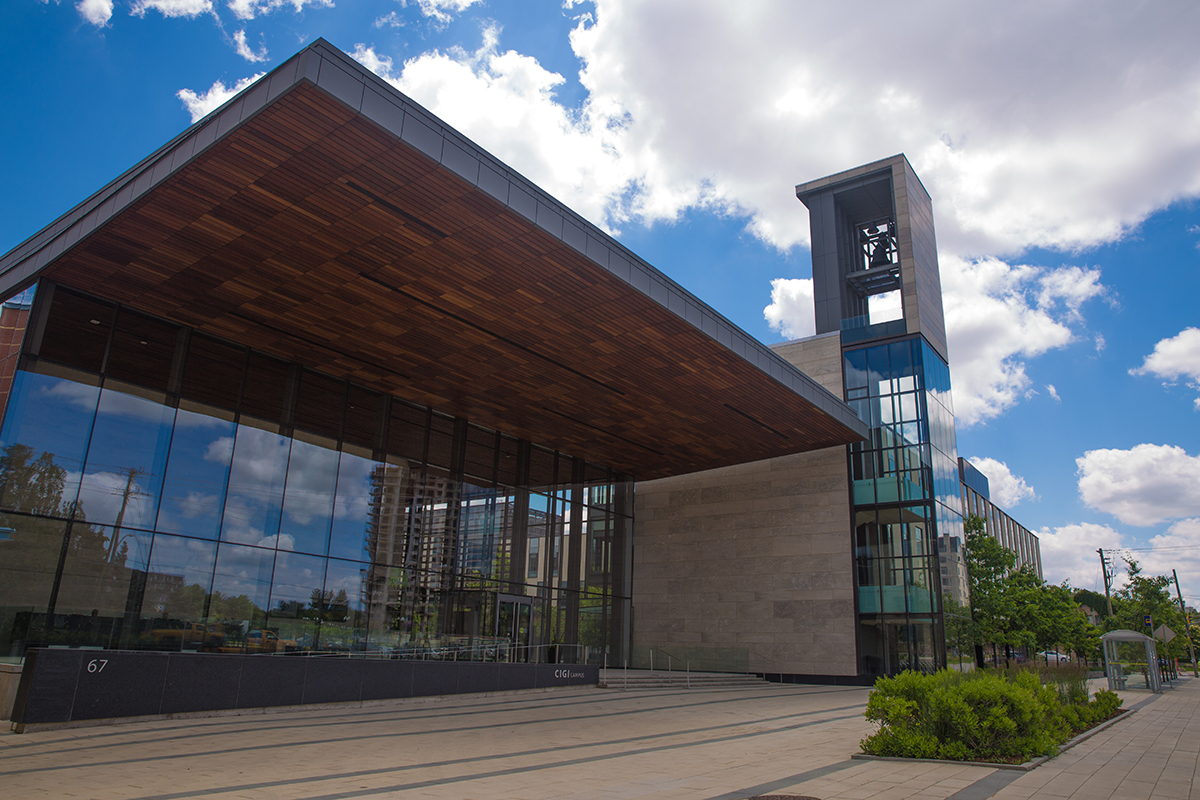
- Type: Hub for research and study of international affairs
- Headquarters: 67 Erb Street West
- Location: Waterloo, Ontario
- Coordinates: 43°27′49″N 80°31′32″W
- Parent organization: The Centre for International Governance Innovation
- Affiliations: Balsillie School of International Affairs
- Website: www.cigionline.org

The CIGI Campus, located in Waterloo, Ontario, is a hub of academic study and policy-based research in global governance and international affairs. Currently, the campus is home to its namesake Centre for International Governance Innovation (CIGI), a global think tank previously housed in the former Seagram Museum, and the Balsillie School of International Affairs (BSIA).

== History ==
In 2009, CIGI announced plans to house the BSIA within a "CIGI Campus" that would be built alongside its headquarters in Waterloo. The resulting $68 million complex received federal and provincial funding totalling $50 million through the Knowledge Infrastructure Program and Ontario's 2009 Budget. The City of Waterloo donated the land for the campus through a 99-year lease.

Toronto-based Kuwabara Payne McKenna Blumberg Architects was selected to design the CIGI Campus building in a classic Oxbridge style, complete with an inner courtyard and bell tower. Construction began in 2009 and substantially concluded in late 2011.

== Features ==
Within the CIGI Campus courtyard is a public art installation crafted by Richard Fleischner. The art piece highlights significant moments of progress in international governance, with copper markers located on an unseen world map. The campus has received the Governor General's Medals in Architecture and other awards for its design.

The building also incorporates environmentally friendly green roofs, operable windows, energy-efficient in-slab cooling and heating systems, and an underground cistern to collect grey water for landscape irrigation. The building was constructed using a BubbleDeck system that reduces structural concrete usage, and as a whole, achieves a 50-percent energy reduction beyond the requirements of the National Building Code.

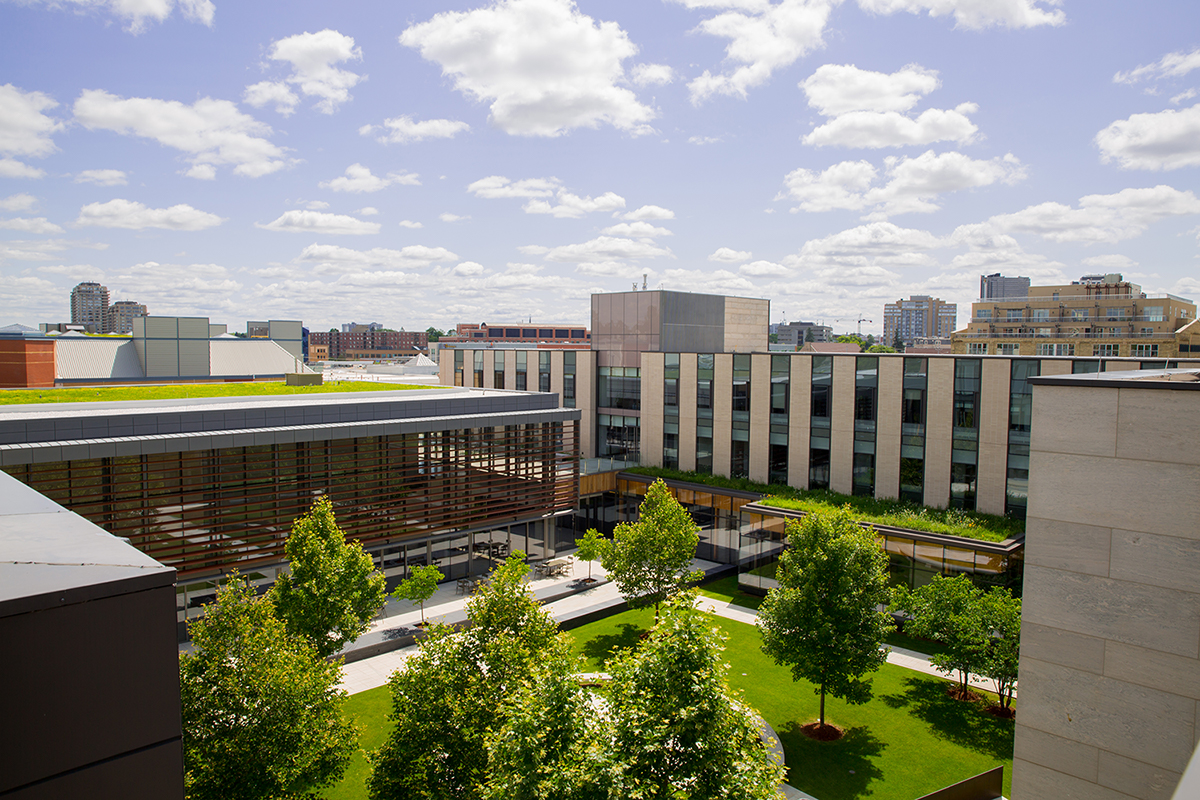
View of the CIGI Campus

The campus also houses the CIGI Auditorium, a 250-seat theatre-style space for public lectures and events, as well as a café operated by Stone Crock Bakery.

== Occupants ==
In addition to CIGI, the campus is home to the BSIA, an academic and research partnership between CIGI, the University of Waterloo and Wilfrid Laurier University. The BSIA was the first occupant of the campus in fall 2011 and comprises roughly 60 percent of the campus building. Additional occupants on the campus include: Perimeter Institute, the Arctic Research Foundation and Innovation Asset Collective.
