= Clem Sunter =

South African business executive and futurist (1944–2026)

- Born: Christopher Louis Clem Sunter; 8 August 1944; Suffolk, England
- Died: 18 February 2026 (aged 81); Somerset West, Western Cape, South Africa
- Education: University of Oxford
- Occupations: Futurist, scenario planner, business leader and author
- Spouse: Margaret Rowland
- Children: 3

Christopher Louis Clem Sunter (8 August 1944 – 18 February 2026) was a South African futurist, scenario planner, business executive and author. He is best known for developing the High Road/Low Road scenarios in the 1980s, which outlined potential political and economic futures for South Africa during the late apartheid era and contributed to public discourse leading up to the country's democratic transition.

== Early life and career ==
Sunter was born Christopher Louis Clem Sunter on 8 August 1944 in Suffolk, England. He attended Winchester College and studied Politics, Philosophy and Economics at the University of Oxford. In the early 1970s, he joined the Anglo American group in South Africa, where he worked for much of his career. In 1971 he moved to Lusaka in Zambia to work for Anglo American Corporation Central Africa. From there he was transferred to the head office of Anglo American in Johannesburg in 1973. From 1990 to 1996, he served as chairman and chief executive officer of the company's Gold and Uranium Division, then the world's largest gold producer.

== Scenario planning ==
In the mid-1980s, Sunter led Anglo American's scenario planning team, adapting techniques pioneered by Shell. His most influential work was the "High Road/Low Road" scenarios for "The World and South Africa in the 1990s", which contrasted a path of negotiation, peaceful transformation, and economic growth (High Road) with one of escalating conflict and instability (Low Road). These scenarios were presented to figures including then-President P. W. Botha's cabinet in 1986 and to Nelson Mandela in prison shortly before his release. They gained widespread attention and are credited by some (including former President F. W. de Klerk) with influencing key actors toward a negotiated settlement. Sunter authored or co-authored around 18 books on futurism, strategy, and scenario planning, including The Mind of a Fox: Scenario Planning in Action (co-authored with Chantell Ilbury, 2001), which anticipated major global risks.

== Personal life and death ==
Sunter married Margaret Rowland in 1969; they had three children and seven grandchildren. He died of cancer at his home in Somerset West, Western Cape, South Africa, on 18 February 2026, at the age of 81. South African President Cyril Ramaphosa paid tribute, highlighting his role in shaping national strategic thinking.

== Bibliography ==
Books by Clem Sunter

- "The World and South Africa in the 1990s" (1987) - Early work on scenarios including the High Road/Low Road framework.
- "The Casino Model" (1994)
- "The High Road: Where Are We Now?" (1996)
- "AIDS: The Challenge for South Africa" (2000, co-authored with Alan Whiteside)
- The "Fox Trilogy", co-authored with Chantell Ilbury:
  - "The Mind of a Fox: Scenario Planning in Action" (2001)
  - "Games Foxes Play: Planning for Extraordinary Times" (2005)
  - "Socrates and the Fox: A Strategic Dialogue" (2007)
- "Flag watching: How a Fox Decodes the Future" (2015)
- "Thinking the Future: New Perspectives from the Shoulders of Giants" (2021, co-authored with Mitch Ilbury)
- "21st Century Megatrends - Perspectives from a Fox".
