= Balsillie School of International Affairs =

International affairs school in Waterloo, Canada

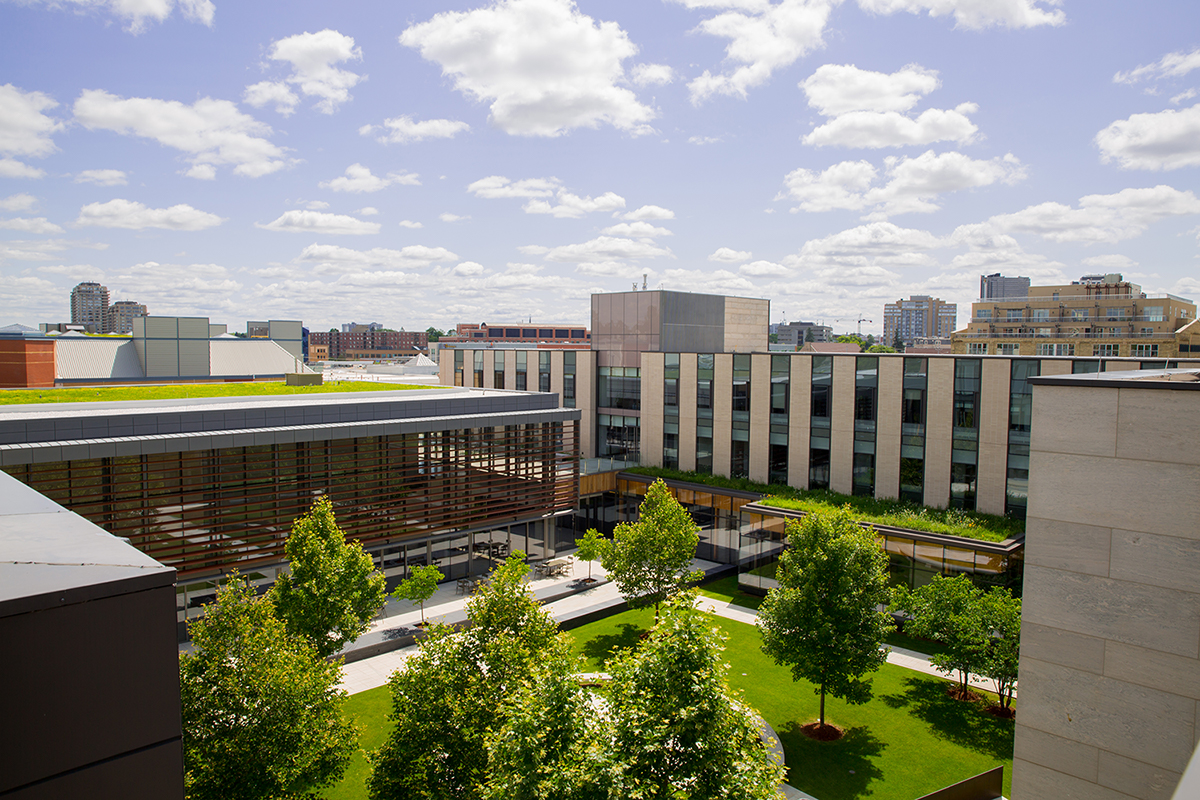
- CIGI Campus, home to the BSIA
- Other name: BSIA
- Type: Public–private partnership graduate school
- Established: 2007; 19 years ago
- Parent institution: University of Waterloo; Wilfrid Laurier University; Centre for International Governance Innovation
- Affiliations: APSIA
- Director: Ann Fitz-Gerald
- Faculty: 100+ including BSIA and postdoctoral fellows
- Students: 80+
- Location: 67 Erb Street West, Waterloo, Ontario, Canada; 43°27′50″N 80°31′31″W
- Campus: Urban
- Website: www.balsillieschool.ca

The Balsillie School of International Affairs (BSIA) is a centre for advanced research and teaching on global governance and international public policy, located in Waterloo, Ontario. As one of the largest social sciences initiatives in Canada, the school is a collaborative partnership between the University of Waterloo, Wilfrid Laurier University, and the Centre for International Governance Innovation. The BSIA is an affiliate member of the Association of Professional Schools of International Affairs, a group of schools that educate leaders in international affairs. The BSIA is housed in the north and west wings of the CIGI Campus. Admission to BSIA is highly selective.

== History ==
The BSIA partnership was announced in 2007 when Blackberry co-CEO and CIGI Founder Jim Balsillie donated $50 million to the initiative. Wilfrid Laurier University and the University of Waterloo would also make investments toward the school totaling $50 million ($25 million from each) over the next decade. From 2007 to 2011, classes at the BSIA took place at Laurier University and University of Waterloo.

In 2009, plans were announced to house the BSIA within a "CIGI Campus" that would be built alongside the think tank's headquarters in Waterloo. The resulting $68 million complex received federal and provincial funding totaling $50 million through the Knowledge Infrastructure Program and Ontario's 2009 Budget. The City of Waterloo donated the land for the campus through a 99-year lease. Construction began in 2009 and lasted for approximately two years. In October 2011, the BSIA held its first classes in the CIGI Campus.

== Rankings and reputation ==
Canadian international relations scholars have ranked the Balsillie School the 4th best school in Canada for students seeking a career in public policy, as well as the 4th best school in Canada for students seeking an academic career studying international relations. CIGI was also ranked 1st as the most prominent think tank in Canada. Scholars who were polled noted both that the Balsillie School has gained prominence rapidly since its founding in 2007, and has attained a reputation for being well-funded.

== Academics ==
The BSIA, with its degree-granting partners Wilfrid Laurier University and University of Waterloo, offers four degrees programs:

=== PhD in Global Governance ===
Graduate students in the program examine the actors, institutions, ideas, rules, and processes that contribute to the management of global society. In addition to international organizations and inter-state relations, the study of global governance examines the various non-state actors as well as the realities of contemporary life that contribute to the establishment and functioning of global rules, norms and institutions. The Global Governance PhD program interrogates the concepts, tools, and assumptions that have served scholars in the past and assesses new approaches for addressing contemporary and future challenges. Students are also offered opportunities to gain relevant international work experience, whether as a visiting scholar at a top-ranked university, a fellow at a leading think tank, or an intern with an internationally recognized non-governmental organization or in the UN system. Specializations include:

- Conflict and Security
- Global Political Economy
- Global Social Governance
- Global Environment
- Global Justice and Human Rights
- Multilateral Institutions and Diplomacy

=== MBA and MIPP Double Degree ===
Designed to be completed in two years, this program is for individuals aiming to bridge the divide between public and private sectors. This intensive program begins with the "Foundation in Global Public Policy" course. Thereafter, students will join the regular stream full-time MBA students for the program's Integrated Core courses Laurier University. Students will then split the remainder of their time and courses at both the BSIA and the Laurier, with a paid four-month workplace experience in their second year.

=== Master of International Public Policy (MIPP) ===
Designed to be completed in 12 months, students complete three terms of course work, each of which builds a specific skill set. The first term emphasizes core skills in public sector economics, policy analysis, statistics, and international relations. These core skills are then applied during the following two terms to a selected field of concentration in international public policy.

=== MA in Global Governance (MAGG) ===
Designed to be completed in sixteen months, the program typically consists of two terms of course work; a third term in which students complete a Major Research Paper (MRP) on a specific research topic of their choosing relating to the study of global governance; followed by a fourth term as an intern working on a relevant global governance issue at a research institute, NGO, government organization, or within the private sector. Students can also take advantage of a number of exchange opportunities. MAGG students can also completed a double degree with the University of Warwick (an additional 8 months) or a pathways program with the American University. Only around 15–18 students are admitted to this program each year.

=== Graduate Fellowship ===
Select incoming students enrolled in either the Master of International Public Policy (MIPP) or the Master's of Arts in Global Governance (MAGG) programs may receive a Graduate Fellowship. During the program, fellows are normally asked to conduct research for a BSIA project and co-author a policy brief, which they will present to senior policy makers at an end-of-year symposium. Briefs that are deemed to be of high quality are normally published. The fellowship program runs in partnership with Global Affairs Canada.

== Partnerships ==
The BSIA Master of Arts in Global Governance has partnerships with the School of International Service at American University and the Department of Politics and International Studies at the University of Warwick. Students can also spend a term abroad on exchange, either with the International Conflict Administration and Management program at the University of Konstanz in Germany or the School of Political Science and International Studies at the University of Queensland in Australia.

Other partnerships include organizations such as the United Nations Association in Canada, Global Affairs Canada, Canadian Red Cross, Civicus, Bonn International Center for Conversion, The Dalai Lama Center for Ethics and Transformative Values at the Massachusetts Institute of Technology.

== Research ==
The Balsillie School of International Affairs runs their Global Governance Fellowship in partnership with Global Affairs Canada where students, working with BSIA faculty, contribute to research activities identified by Global Affairs Canada. Students develop policy briefs, which are presented to the Foreign Policy Research and Foresight Division at Global Affairs Canada.

=== Associated Research Centres ===
- Academic Council on the United Nations System
- Cybersecurity and Privacy Institute (CPI)
- The International Migration Research Centre (IMRC)
- The Laurier Centre for Sustainable Food Systems (CSFS)
- Canadian Network for Research on Terrorism, Security, and Society
- The Water Institute
- WISE Waterloo Institute for Sustainable Energy

=== Research clusters ===
The BSIA's research clusters connects faculty, fellows and graduate students to conduct and support research initiatives in areas of global governance and international policy. The concept of a research ‘cluster’ represents the manner in which these research groups work across different domains – spanning social, life, physical, material and natural science – and collaborate in order to support specific research problems and future policy challenges. The Clusters also host events and guest presenters, and provide support to policymakers.

- Conflict and Security: This cluster comprises researchers across a range of disciplines including political science, history, geography, sociology, education, economics, and with growing links to the STEM fields.
- Environment and Resources: This cluster engages global governance challenges associated with large-scale environmental and resource degradation.
- Global Health: This cluster comprises scholars and practitioners from multiple academic disciplines and backgrounds to tackle critical health related challenges by way of research, practice, and policy making.
- Global Political Economy: This cluster comprises researchers from disciplines such as economics, political science, and international studies to study the international, comparative and domestic political economy.
- Migration, Mobilities, and Social Politics: This cluster comprises researchers from disciplines such as communication studies, geography, political science, and sociology to examine the challenges related to the governance of migration.
- Multilateral Institutions: This cluster comprises researchers from disciplines such as economics, political science, geography, environmental studies, and communication studies among others.
- STEM for Global Resilience: This cluster is critical to informing public debate and shaping the policy discourses addressing the links between technology, innovation, social and economic policy.

== Faculty and personnel ==
The inaugural director of the BSIA was Ramesh Thakur, a former CIGI fellow and vice-rector at the United Nations University. In 2010, he was succeeded by David A. Welch, then CIGI chair of global security and professor of political science at the University of Waterloo, who served until 2013, followed by John Ravenhill until 2019. The current director is Ann Fitz-Gerald.

There are over 100 affiliated faculty members teaching in the BSIA's three academic programs. Notable faculty and fellows include:

- Jennifer Clapp
- Andrew F. Cooper
- Jonathan Crush
- Simon Dalby
- Shohini Ghose
- Paul Heinbecker
- Jorge Heine
- Eric Helleiner
- Randolph Mank
- Alison Mountz
- Bruce Muirhead
- James W. St.G. Walker
- Marie-Claire Cordonier Segger
- David A. Welch
- Alan Whiteside
