= Simon Dalby (academic) =

Irish academic

- Occupations: Academic and an author

Academic background
- Education: B.A. Geography; M.A. Geography; Ph.D. Geography
- Alma mater: University of Dublin; University of Victoria; Simon Fraser University

Academic work
- Institutions: Wilfrid Laurier University

Simon Dalby is an Irish-born academic and an author. He is a professor emeritus in the Wilfrid Laurier University.

Dalby is known for his work on climate change, environmental security, and geopolitics and is the recipient of 1997–98 Carleton University Faculty Research Achievement Award. He has also authored several books, including Rethinking Environmental Security and Anthropocene Geopolitics: Globalization, Security, Sustainability.

== Education ==
Dalby earned a B.A. in geography from Trinity College, University of Dublin, in 1979, followed by an M.A. in geography from the University of Victoria in 1982. He later obtained a Ph.D. in geography from Simon Fraser University in 1988.

== Career ==
Dalby began his academic career in 1979 as a teaching assistant at the University of Victoria, serving until 1982. He then joined Simon Fraser University, where he was a teaching assistant from 1983 to 1986 and a Research Intern from 1986 to 1988. From 1988 to 1989, he was an instructor in the Geography Department while also teaching at Vancouver Community College from 1988 to 1990. At Simon Fraser University, he served as a research associate in the Centre for International Studies from 1990 to 1991 and in the Department of Political Science from 1991 to 1992. Between 1992 and 1993, he was an instructor in the Department of Social Science at Douglas College in New Westminster. In 1993, he joined Carleton University as an assistant professor, serving until 1995. He was an associate professor from 1996 to 2001 and a tenured professor in the Department of Geography and Environmental Studies from 2001 to 2012.

In 2012 he joined Wilfrid Laurier, as a tenured professor, and from 2012 to 2018 he served as the CIGI chair in the Political Economy of Climate Change at the Balsillie School of International Affairs. He retired in 2022 and became a professor emeritus at Wilfrid Laurier, a BSIA Fellow at the Balsillie School, a distinguished non-resident fellow at the Center for Global Studies at the University of Victoria and a member of the Planet Politics Institute.

Many of his key research themes are summarised in the 2007 open-access article Anthropocene Geopolitics published in Geography Compass. A collection of his publications, co-edited with Roger Boyd, including a lengthy intellectual autobiography, was published by Springer in 2025.

== Awards and honors ==
- 1997-1998 – Faculty Research Achievement Award, Carleton University
- 2012-2018 – CIGI chair in the Political Economy of Climate Change, Wilfrid Laurier University

== Books ==
- Environmental Security (2002) ISBN 9780816640263
- Security and Environmental Change (2009) ISBN 9780745642918
- Creating the Second Cold War: The Discourse of Politics (2016) ISBN 9781474291248
- Anthropocene Geopolitics: Globalization, Security, Sustainability (2022) 9780776631189
- Rethinking Environmental Security (2023) ISBN 9781035318926
- Pyromania : Fire and Geopolitics in a Climate-Disrupted World (2024) ISBN 9781788216500
