= Poul S. Jessen =

Danish professor of Optical Sciences

- Education: University of Aarhus
- Awards: Research and Development Magazine, R&D 100 Award (1991)
- Scientific career
- Fields: Physicist
- Workplaces: University of Arizona
- Doctoral advisor: William D. Phillips

Poul S. Jessen holds the position of Professor of Optical Sciences with a joint appointment in Physics at the University of Arizona. He is a founding member of the Center for Quantum Information and Control. He has done experimental research in the areas of optical lattices, quantum information, quantum chaos, and quantum optics.

== Education ==
Jessen received a BSc in physics and chemistry from University of Aarhus, Denmark in 1987, and a PhD from Aarhus in 1993. While studying at Aarhus, Jessen travelled to the United States and worked with William Daniel Phillips at the National Institute of Standards and Technology. When his original doctoral thesis adviser at Aarhus retired, Phillips took over as his thesis adviser.

== Career ==
In 1990 and 1992, he was a guest researcher at NIST; in 1993, he was a postdoctoral fellow at University of Maryland; from 1993 to 1998, he was an assistant professor at the University of Arizona; from 1998 to 2002, he was associate professor at the University of Arizona; and from 2002 he has been a full professor at the University of Arizona. Since 2011, he has been the Chair of Quantum Information and Control in the College of Optical Sciences at the University of Arizona.

He has co-authored more than twenty papers.
