= List of Wilfrid Laurier University people =

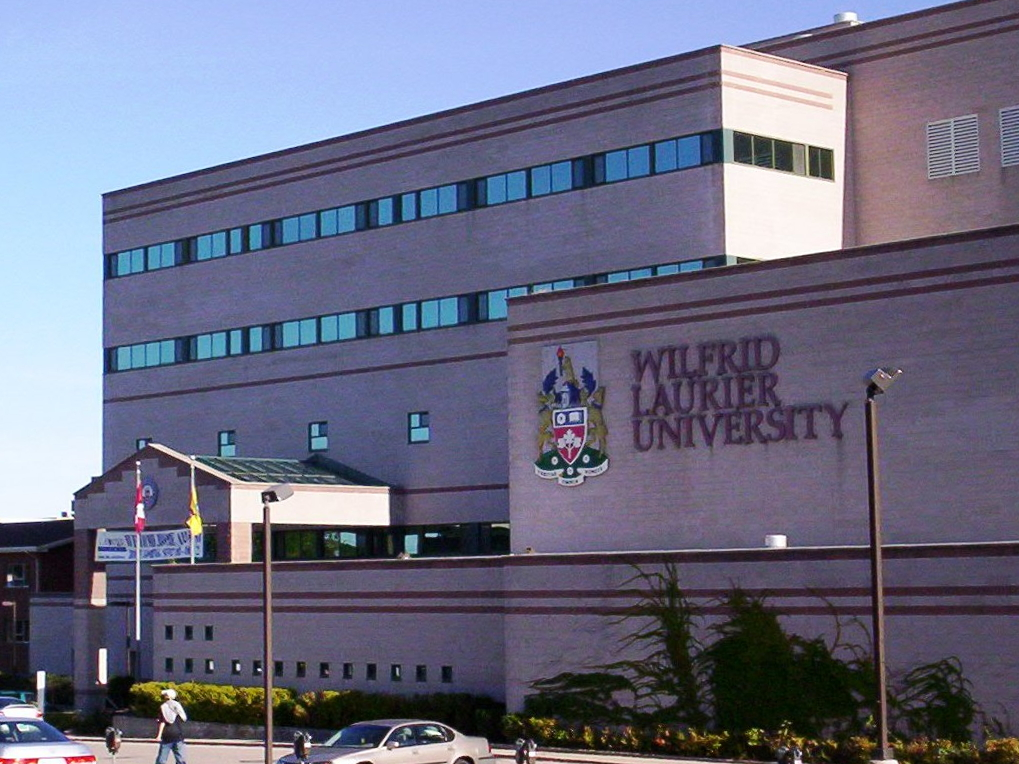
Wilfrid Laurier University's main campus in Waterloo, Ontario

Wilfrid Laurier University is a public university located in Waterloo, Ontario, Canada, and was founded in 1911 as the Evangelical Lutheran Seminary of Canada and later Waterloo Lutheran University. It was renamed Wilfrid Laurier University in 1973 by the Government of Ontario under the Wilfrid Laurier University Act in 1973. The school is one of the fastest-growing universities in Canada; its enrollment doubled from 2002 to 2007, and it has 12,000 full-time undergraduate students as of 2008. Wilfrid Laurier University also has two satellite campuses in Brantford and Kitchener, both in Ontario.

People associated with Wilfrid Laurier University include faculty, alumni, staff, honorary degree recipients, chancellors, and presidents. The university has had eleven chancellors, including the incumbent Eileen Mercier. Wilfrid Laurier University has had seven presidents, including the incumbent Deborah MacLatchy, who has served in this position since 1 July 2017.

== Alumni and faculty ==
Fields with a — have unknown values.

=== Alumni ===
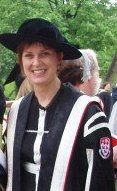
Heather Munroe-Blum, principal of McGill University

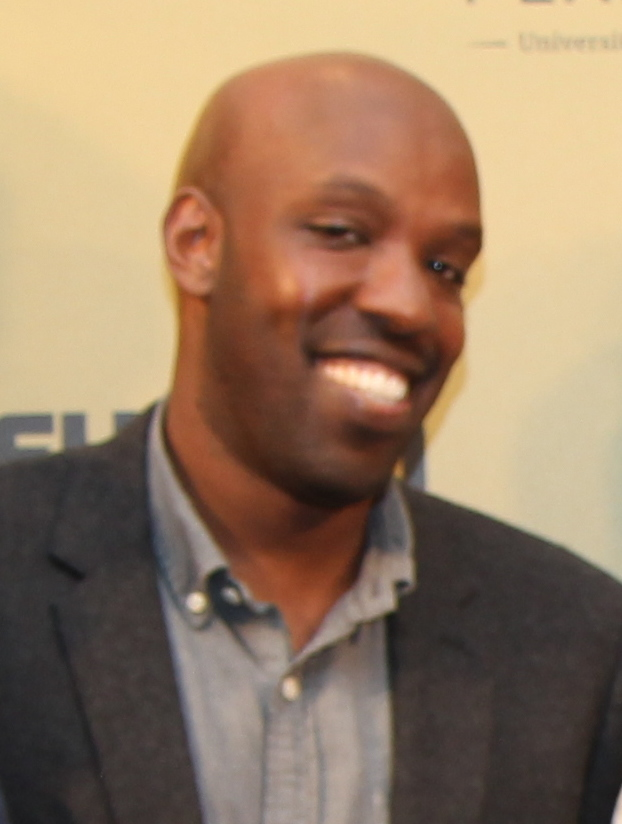
Shad, rapper

Name	Relationship	Discipline	Known for	Notes
Harold Albrecht	Undergraduate	General	Member of Parliament	
Dean Allison	Undergraduate	Economics	Conservative member of Parliament	
Ted Arnott	Undergraduate	Business administration	Progressive Conservative member of the Ontario Provincial Parliament	
Paul Bennett	Undergraduate	Sports	Canadian Football League defensive back	
Mary Berg	Undergraduate	History and English	Chef, television personality, cookbook author	
David Black	Undergraduate	English and anthropology	Canadian Football League offensive lineman	
Robert Boyce	Undergraduate	Economics	Senior lecturer at London School of Economics	
Niki Budalić	Undergraduate	MBA	Soccer player; led the Golden Hawks to a national title; later general manager at Orlando City SC	
Micah Chisholm	Undergraduate	—	Soccer player for Hannover 96 II and Toronto FC II	
Glen Chorny	Undergraduate	Business and history	Poker player	
Rod Connop	Undergraduate	Sports	Canadian Football League offensive lineman	
Sean Conway	Undergraduate	Politics	Legislative Assembly of Ontario member	
Jean Crowder	Undergraduate	Psychology	Politician	
Mike Davies	Undergraduate	Sports	Ice hockey player for the Kitchener Rangers, Saginaw Spirit, and St. Catharines Falcons	
Bill Downe	Undergraduate	Business	Bank of Montreal president and CEO	
Doug Downey	Undergraduate	Political science	Attorney general of Ontario and Progressive Conservative member of the Ontario Provincial Parliament	
Cindy Eadie	Undergraduate	Economics	Hockey goaltender	
John Estacio	Undergraduate	Composition	Composer	
Ken Evraire	Undergraduate	Communication studies	Television journalist	
Peter Gilfillan	Undergraduate	Sports	Canada international soccer player; four-time university all-Canadian	
John Glassford	Undergraduate	Sports	Canadian Football League linebacker	
Corey Grant	Undergraduate	Sports	Canadian Football League wide receiver	
Raj Grewal	Undergraduate	Business	Member of Parliament	
Paul Heinbecker	Research fellow	Politics	Canadian ambassador to the United Nations	
Lyndon Hooper	Undergraduate	Physical education	Canada international soccer player (68 caps, 18 World Cup qualifiers); two-time all-Canadian at Laurier	
Paul James	Undergraduate	Sociology	Canada international who played at the 1986 FIFA World Cup; Canada Soccer Hall of Fame member	
Ivan Jurisic	Undergraduate	Sports	Soccer player	
Julie Karn	Undergraduate	Kinesiology and physical education	Soccer player for FF USV Jena	
Carl Klinck	Undergraduate	General	Waterloo College professor	
Dave Knechtel	Undergraduate	Economics	Canadian Football League defensive tackle	
Alyssa Lagonia	Undergraduate	Sports	Canada international soccer player	
Jenna Lambert	Undergraduate	Athlete	Swam across Lake Ontario despite having cerebral palsy	
William C. Leggett	Undergraduate	General	Queen's University principal	
Dave Levac	Undergraduate	—	Member of the Legislative Assembly of Ontario	
Ian Logan	Undergraduate	Sports	Canadian Football League safety	
Brian Masse	Undergraduate	Sociology	Member of the House of Commons of Canada	
Chuck McMann	Undergraduate	Psychology	Canadian Football League player	
Ted McMeekin	Graduate	Social work	Member of the Legislative Assembly of Ontario	
Jacob Moon	Undergraduate	Music	Singer-songwriter	
Heather Munroe-Blum	Graduate	Social work	McGill University principal	
Cheryl Pounder	Undergraduate	Sports	Two-time Olympic gold medalist - ice hockey	
Jim Reid	Undergraduate	Sports	CFL player	
Damien Robitaille	Undergraduate	Classical music	Musician	
Anthony Rota	Undergraduate	Politics	Member of the House of Commons of Canada	
Donnie Ruiz	Undergraduate	Sports	Canadian Football League free safety	
Jeffrey Ryan	Undergraduate	Music	Composer	
Sam Schachter			Olympic volleyball player	
Shad	Undergraduate	Business	Hip hop musician	
Doug Smith	Undergraduate	Sports	Canadian Football League offensive lineman	
Charles Sousa	Undergraduate	Business	Canadian member of Provincial Parliament	
Lance Storm	Undergraduate	Business	World Wrestling Entertainment professional wrestler	
Helen Stoumbos	Undergraduate	Sports	Scored Canada's first goal at the FIFA Women's World Cup; Canada Soccer Hall of Fame member; four-time all-Canadian at Laurier	
Andre Talbot	Undergraduate	Sports	Canadian Football League wide receiver	
Kenneth Tam	Graduate	History	Science-fiction author	
Keegan Connor Tracy	Undergraduate	Social psychology	Actress	
Ian Troop	Undergraduate	Business	CEO, 2015 Pan Am Games	
Larry Uteck	Graduate	Sports	Canadian Football League player	
Chris Van Vliet	Undergraduate	Communications	Television personality and journalist	
Laura Walker	Undergraduate	—	Curler	
Carolyn A. Wilkins	Undergraduate	Economics	Economist and first woman to serve as deputy governor of the Bank of Canada	
Andrew Witer	Undergraduate	—	Member of the House of Commons of Canada	
Stephen Woodworth	Undergraduate	Law	Politician	

=== Faculty ===
Name	Relationship	Discipline	Known for	Notes
Kimberly Barber	Professor	Opera	Mezzo-soprano and vocal pedagogue	
Marie Bountrogianni	Assistant professor	—	Member of the Legislative Assembly of Ontario	
Phelim Boyle	Professor	Finance	Initiated the use of Monte Carlo methods in option pricing	
Jim Breithaupt	Board of Governors member	—	Member of the Legislative Assembly of Ontario	
Terry Copp	Professor emeritus	Military history	Professor	
Craig Fleisher	Professor	Economics	Researcher	
Shohini Ghose	Professor		Physics	
Walter Hachborn	Board of Governors member	—	Co-founder of Home Hardware	
Brian Henderson	Director of Laurier Press	—	Poet	
Morgan Holmes	Professor	Sociology	Intersex activist and scholar	
Tuffy Knight	Coach	Sports	Wilfrid Laurier Golden Hawks head coach	
John Warwick Montgomery	Chairman	History	Chairman of the Department of History	
Alison Mountz	Professor	Geography	Canada Research Chair in Global Migration	
Kim Ondaatje	Lecturer	Literature	Part-time lecturer	
John Reimer	Board of Governors member	—	Member of Parliament	
Adele Reinhartz	Dean	Literature	Dean of Graduate Studies and Research	
Roger Sarty	Professor	Military history	Canadian Forces Maritime Command historian	
Lindsay Shepherd	Teaching assistant	Communication studies	Free-speech activism	
Linda Catlin Smith	Professor	Music theory	Professor of composition at Wilfrid Laurier	
Andrew Telegdi	Board of Governors member	—	Former Liberal member of Parliament in the House of Commons of Canada (1993–2008)	
Cynthia Johnston Turner	Dean of the Faculty of Music	Music	Conductor	
Norman Wagner	Dean of graduate studies	Literature	Archaeologist	
Darren Wershler-Henry	Assistant professor	Communication studies	Experimental poet	

== Honorary degree recipients ==
DDiv – Doctor of Divinity; DLitt – Doctor of Letters; LLD – Doctor of Laws

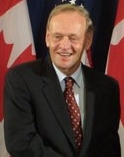
Jean Chrétien, former Prime Minister of Canada

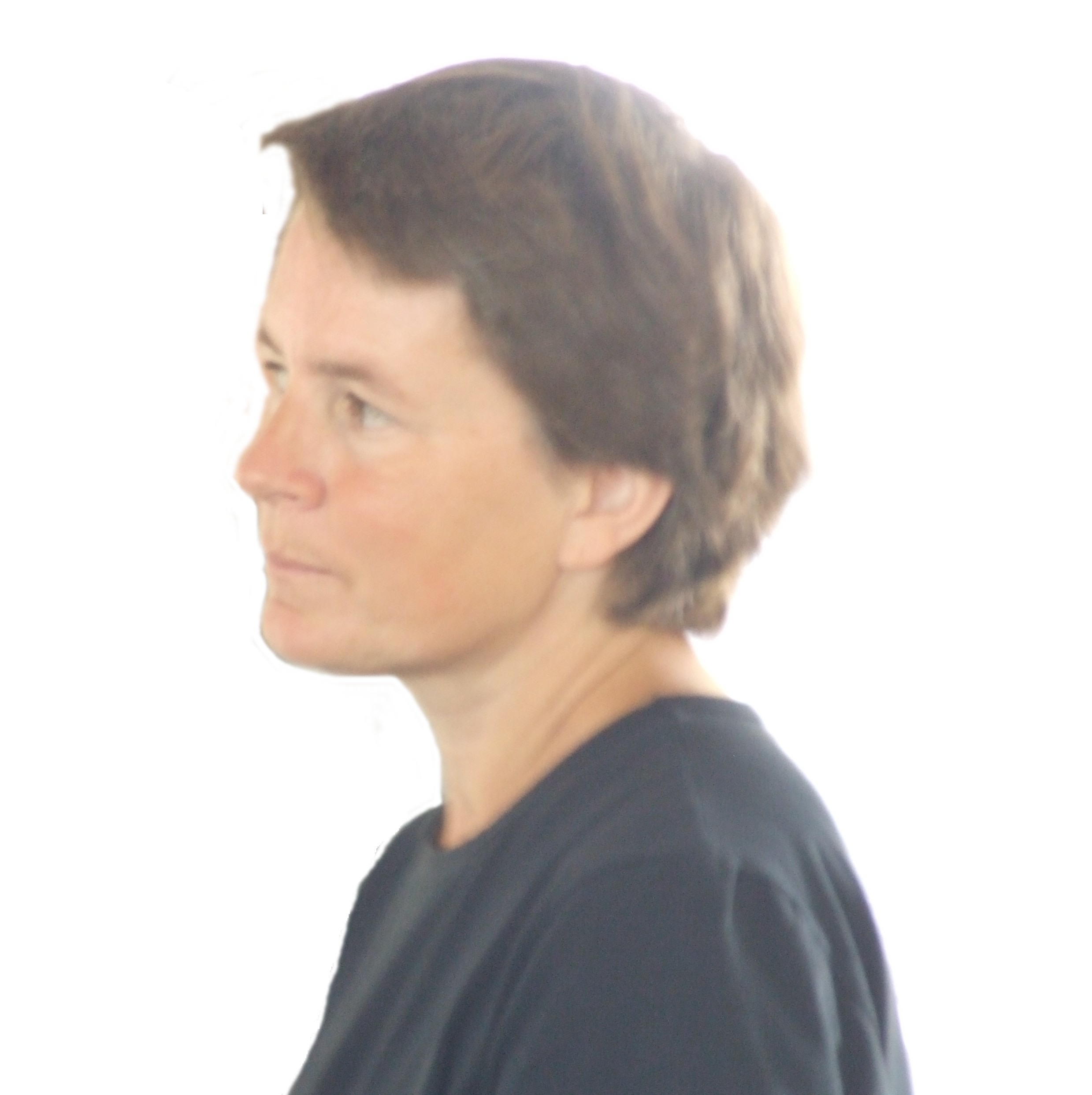
Deborah Ellis, recipient of the Governor General's Award for English language children's literature

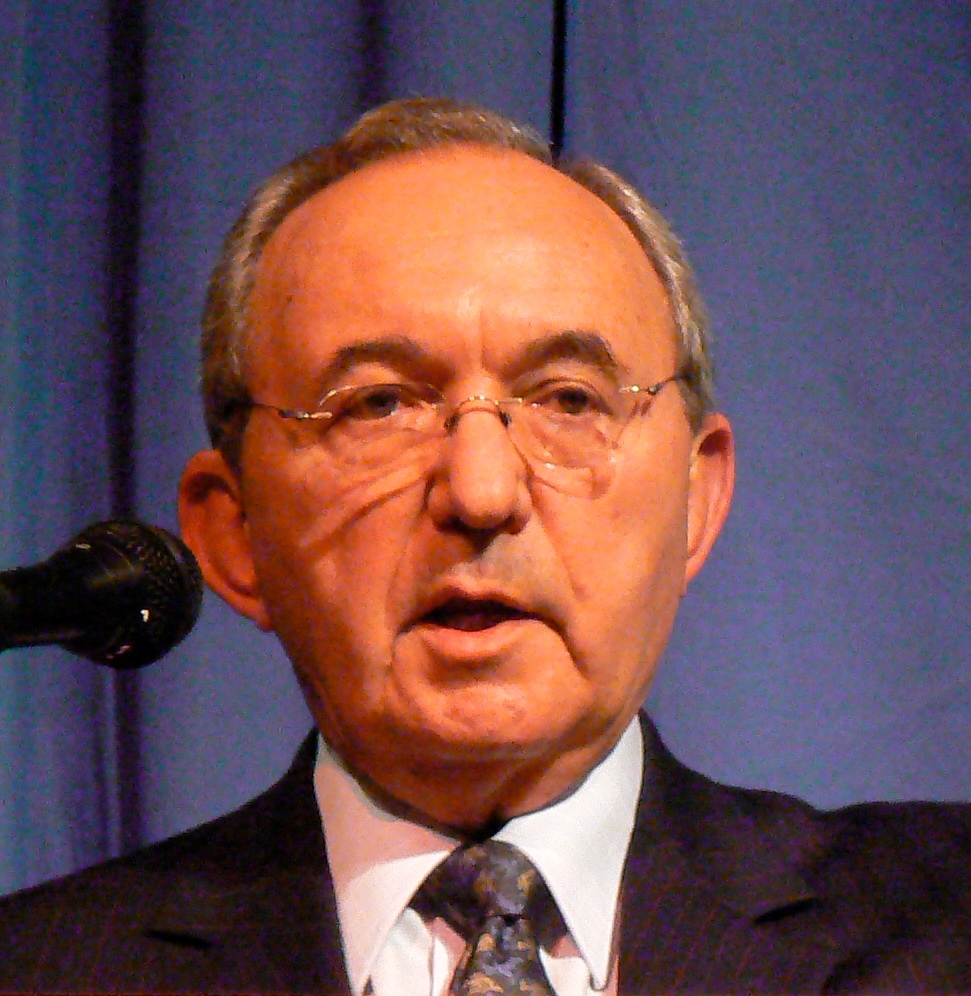
Richard Goldstone, South African judge

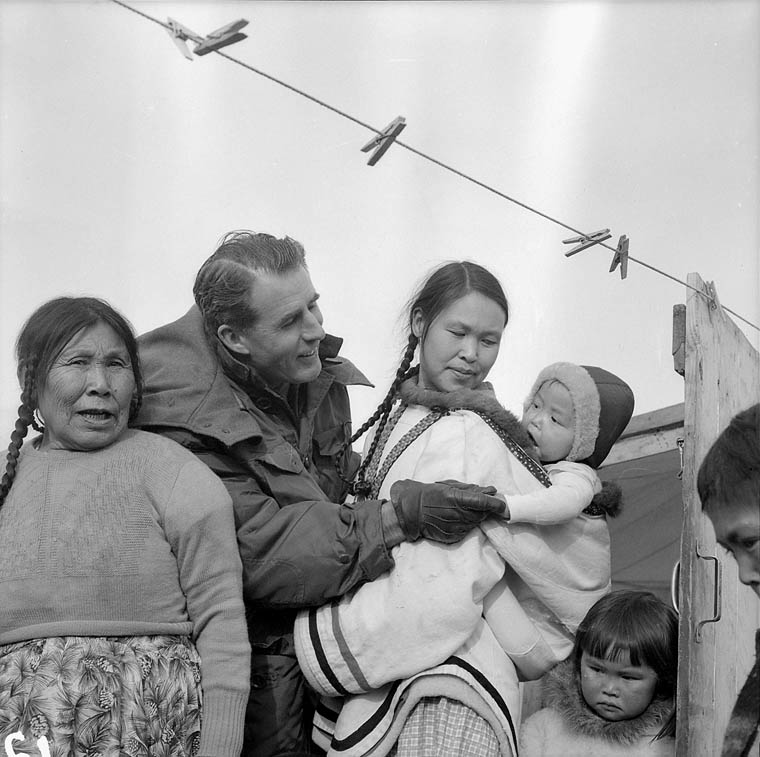
George Hees, politician

Name	Degree	Year	Known for	Notes
John Black Aird	LLD	November 1975	Lieutenant governor of Ontario, Canada	
Raffi Armenian	LLD	June 1991	Conductor, pianist, composer, and teacher	
Lloyd Axworthy	LLD	June 2008	Minister of Foreign Affairs of Canada	
Thomas Axworthy	LLD	June 2003	Principal secretary of Canada	
Maude Barlow	DLitt	June 2004	National chairperson of The Council of Canadians	
James Bartleman	LLD	June 2007	Lieutenant-governor of Ontario	
Adam Beach	DLitt	June 2014	Actor	
Derek Burney	LLD	June 1998	Progressive Conservative Party of Canada political strategist	
Micheline Charest	LLD	June 1997	Founder of Cookie Jar Group	
David Barr Chilton	DLitt	June 2006	Author and self-publisher of The Wealthy Barber	
Jean Chrétien	LLD	May 1981	Prime minister of Canada	
John E. Cleghorn	LLD	October 1991	Chief executive officer of Royal Bank of Canada	
Terry Copp	LLD	June 2005	Professor at Wilfrid Laurier University	
Maureen Kempston Darkes	LLD	June 1998	General Motors vice president	
William Grenville Davis	LLD	October 1963	Progressive Conservative premier of Ontario	
Paul Desmarais	LLD	May 1979	Fifth richest person in Canada	
John George Diefenbaker	LLD	November 1968	Prime minister of Canada	
Pat Doherty	DLitt	October 1993	Vice president of Sinn Féin	
Howard Dyck	LLD	May 1996	Conductor and broadcaster	
Deborah Ellis	DLitt	June 2005	Winner of the Governor General's Award	
John English	DLitt	May 1992	Academic	
Willard Zebedee Estey	LLD	May 1977	Justice of the Supreme Court of Canada	
John Robert Evans	LLD	May 1975	Chairman of the Rockefeller Foundation	
Timothy Findley	DLitt	June 2001	Novelist and playwright	
Donald Methuen Fleming	LLD	October 1967	Official of the International Monetary Fund	
Maureen Forrester	LLD	November 1975	Operatic contralto	
Franklin Clark Fry	LLD	October 1963	Lutheran clergyman	
Richard Goldstone	LLD	October 1995	South African judge	
Buzz Hargrove	LLD	June 2004	National president of the Canadian Auto Workers	
George Harris Hees	LLD	May 1961	Politician	
Paul Heinbecker	LLD	May 1993	Canadian ambassador to the United Nations	
James Hillier	LLD	May 2002	Built the first electron microscope in North America	
Mel Hurtig	LLD	October 1985	President of the Art Gallery of Alberta	
Diamond Jenness	LLD	May 1962	Anthropology	
Russell Johnson	LLD	June 2003	Architectural acoustician	
Urho Kaleva Kekkonen	LLD	October 1961	Prime minister of Finland	
Anton Kuerti	DLitt	June 2005	Concert pianist	
John Francis Leddy	LLD	November 1972	President of the University of Windsor	
Michael Lee-Chin	LLD	October 2008	Executive of AIC Limited	
William Leggett	LLD	October 1994	Principal of Queen's University	
Stephen Lewis	LLD	May 1988	Social science scholar-in-residence at McMaster University	
Arthur Reginald Marsden Lower	DLitt	May 1964	Royal Navy officer	
William Ross Macdonald	LLD	May 1964	Lieutenant governor of Ontario	
Allan Joseph MacEachen	LLD	October 1976	Deputy prime minister of Canada	
Hugh MacLennan	DLitt	October 1961	Recipient of the Governor General's Award	
Paul Martin	LLD	June 2001	Governor General's Award, prime minister of Canada	
Paul Joseph James Martin	LLD	May 1967	Politician	
Burton Matthews	LLD	June 1996	President of the University of Guelph	
Marnie McBean	LLD	June 1999	Rower at the 2000 Summer Olympics	
Jack McClelland	DLitt	May 1994	Publisher	
Loreena McKennitt	DLitt	December 2002	Celtic music singer	
Walter McLean	LLD	May 1995	Member of Parliament	
Norah Evangeline Michener	LLD	November 1969	Wife of governor general of Canada	
Charles Hibbert Millard	LLD	May 1970	Trade union activist	
John A. Miller	DDiv	May 1966	Roller coaster designer	
Heather Munroe-Blum	LLD	October 2005	Principal of McGill University	
Jan Narveson	DLitt	May 1989	Professor at University of Waterloo	
Peter C. Newman	LLD	May 1983	Journalist	
Christopher Newton	DLitt	June 1997	Artistic director of the Shaw Festival	
Landon Pearson	LLD	May 1995	Canadian senator	
Lester Bowles Pearson	LLD	December 1964	Prime minister of Canada	
John A. Pollock	LLD	October 2001	Chancellor of Wilfrid Laurier University	
Jack Rabinovitch	LLD	October 2007	Founder of the Scotiabank Giller Prize	
John Parmenter Robarts	LLD	May 1971	Premier of Ontario	
Philip Bernard Rynard	LLD	October 1979	Physician, surgeon, and politician	
Nafis Sadik	LLD	October 1995	Special adviser to the secretary-general of the United Nations	
Edward Togo Salmon	DLitt	November 1974	Ancient historian	
Myron S. Scholes	LLD	October 2005	Co-author of the Black–Scholes model	
Carol Shields	DLitt	October 2000	Recipient of the Pulitzer Prize for Fiction	
Joseph Roberts Smallwood	LLD	May 1962	Premier of Newfoundland	
Edna Staebler	DLitt	October 1984	Cookbook author	
Mark Starowicz	DLitt	June 2001	Journalist and producer	
David Strangway	LLD	June 1997	Founder of Quest University	
John Sweeney	LLD	May 1992	Politician and educator	
Kurt Waldheim	LLD	May 1974	Secretary-general of the United Nations	
David James Walker	LLD	May 1976	Politician	
Pamela Wallin	DLitt	June 1999	Television journalist	
Patrick Watson	LLD	October 1989	Broadcaster, author, and commentator	
Sheila Watt-Cloutier	LLD	October 2008	Inuit activist	
Rudy Wiebe	DLitt	June 1991	Professor at the University of Alberta	
Eric Alfred Winkler	LLD	November 1974	Politician	
Klaus Woerner	LLD	October 1999	Founder of ATS Automation Tooling Systems	
John Yaremko	LLD	May 1969	Member of the Legislative Assembly of Ontario	

== Administration ==
=== Chancellors ===
Wilfrid Laurier University has had eleven chancellors.

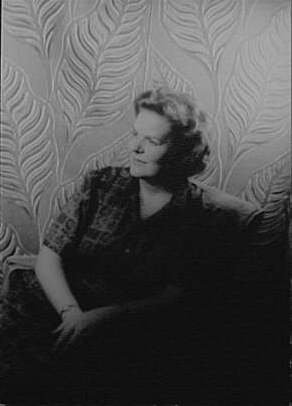
Maureen Forrester, the university's fifth chancellor

#	Name	Term
1	William Daum Euler	May 20, 1961 – July 1961
2	William Ross Macdonald	December 6, 1964 – June 1972
3	Paul Martin Sr.	June 1972 – April 30, 1977
4	John Black Aird	July 4, 1977 – July 3, 1985
5	Maureen Forrester	May 25, 1986 – May 29, 1990
6	Willard Estey	July 12, 1990 – October 30, 1995
7	John Cleghorn	October 27, 1996 – June 10, 2003
8	Bob Rae	September 1, 2003 – March 30, 2008
9	John A. Pollock	March 31, 2008 – October 27, 2011
10	Michael Lee-Chin	October 28, 2011 – September 13, 2016
11	Eileen Mercier	September 14, 2016 – present

=== Presidents ===
Wilfrid Laurier University has had eight presidents.

#	Name	Term
1	William Villaume	1960–1966
2	Frank Peters	1967–1978
3	Neale Tayler	1978–1982
4	John A. Weir	1982–1992
5	Lorna Marsden	1992–1997
6	Robert Rosehart	1997–2006
7	Max Blouw	2007–2017
8	Deborah MacLatchy	2017–present
