= TheMuseum =

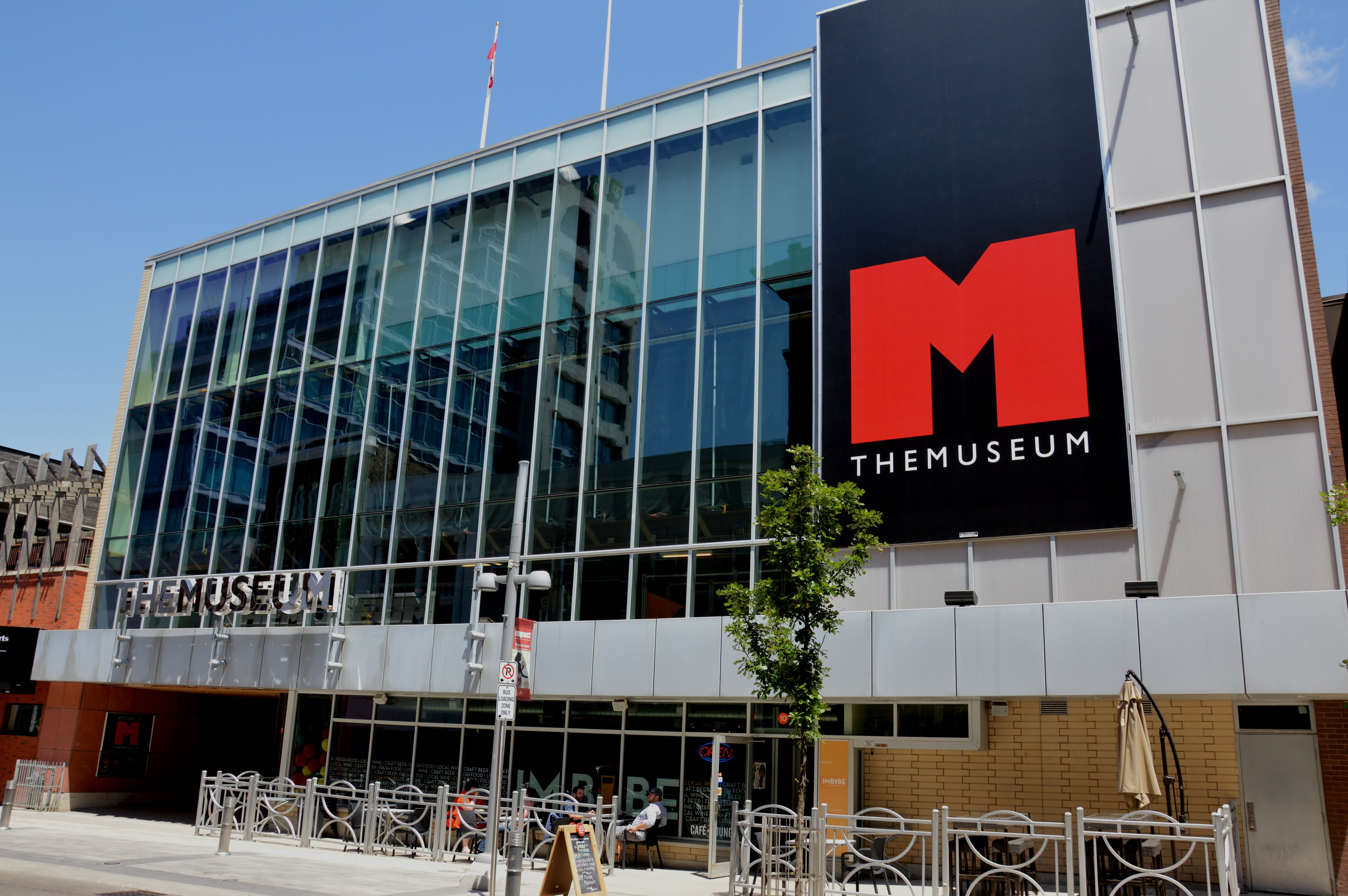
- Established: 2003
- Location: 10 King Street West; Kitchener, Ontario
- Coordinates: 43°27′00″N 80°29′21″W
- Type: Art and technology museum
- President: Deborah MacLatchy
- Website: www.themuseum.ca

TheMuseum (stylized THEMUSEUM, formerly the Waterloo Regional Children's Museum until 2010) is an art and technology museum in Kitchener, Ontario. It opened to the public in September 2003. As of 2026, the current president of the museum is Deborah MacLatchy.

== History ==
The building that houses TheMuseum was historically Goudie's Department Store, one of western Ontario's first and largest department stores at the time.It had been owned by former city council member Arthur Russell Goudie since 1925. The department store closed in 1988.

In 2003, after eight years of planning and fundraising, the building reopened as the Waterloo Regional Children's Museum. It was rebranded as THEMUSEUM in 2010.

In May 2018, the BMO Bank of Montreal building adjacent to the museum offered to sell its building to TheMuseum allowing an expansion of approximatley 40,000 square feet, with the bank pledging to donate CA$1,000,000 to offset renovation costs.

In 2024, museum CEO David Marskell reported that the museum was struggling financially, with 75% of the operating costs covered by self-generated revenue. In May of the same year, the museum successfully appealed to the Kitchener City Council for a one-time grant of CA$300,000 in emergency funding to avoid closure. A bid for an additional CA$150,000 was turned down.

== Affiliations ==
TheMuseum is affiliated with: CMA, CHIN, and Virtual Museum of Canada.

TheMuseum is host to TriCon, a semi-recurring multi-day anime, comic book, and sci-fi convention.
