= Sue-Ann Levy =

Canadian writer and political columnist

Sue-Ann Levy (born September 23, 1956) is a Canadian writer and former political columnist for the Toronto Sun and Postmedia, who focused on municipal and social issues in Ontario. She has been described as 'unapologetically conservative', and has written Underdog: Confessions of a Right-Wing Gay Jewish Muckraker. Levy placed second in the 2009 Ontario by-election as Progressive Conservative candidate for Toronto, St. Paul's. She currently writes for True North Media.

== Early life and education ==
Levy grew up in Hamilton, Ontario, the daughter of an accountant. Levy is the niece of the late Jeffrey S. Lyons, a Toronto lawyer and prominent municipal lobbyist who is best known for having been implicated in the MFP scandal at City Hall. She earned a journalism degree from Carleton University in 1978. After graduating from Carleton, Levy worked as an aide to Ontario Progressive Conservative cabinet minister Frank Drea before returning to school to earn an MBA from the University of Toronto in 1985. She then worked in public relations but left in order to enter journalism as a reporter for the Bracebridge Examiner, before being hired by the Toronto Sun in 1989, whose publisher at the time, Paul Godfrey, described Lyons as "a close pal of mine".

== At the Sun ==
Levy became the Sun's City Hall columnist in 1998 and covered the mayoralties of Mel Lastman, David Miller, and Rob Ford before moving to Queen's Park to cover the Ontario legislature. She later returned to covering city politics under Mayor John Tory.

In 2004, the Ryerson Review of Journalism surveyed city councillors and found that Levy was "rated lowest among the 18 city hall reporters for accuracy, fairness and knowledge". Levy made a reputation as the press gallery's "most unapologetically conservative chronicler of local politics." She created enemies among some city councillors, whom she goaded with derogatory nicknames.

Levy was criticized by the National NewsMedia Council for a "serious breach of journalistic standards" for an October 2018 column which quoted a false allegation that immigrants and refugee claimants temporarily residing at the Radisson Hotel Toronto East were slaughtering goats in one of the hotel's public bathrooms. This assertion was based on on-line reviews of the hotel posted to TripAdvisor and Expedia, and interviews with clients who posted their reviews on Trip Advisor, but were not fact-checked: the council's report noted that Levy did not make "any attempt to visit the hotel, verify the claim, or offer any caution about the failed efforts to do so." Levy's columns were widely circulated online by alt-right commenters on 4chan and Reddit, as well as sites such as Infowars. Two days after the column ran, an unknown person engaged in an act of arson at the hotel.

Levy is the author of the book Underdog: Confessions of a Right-Wing Gay Jewish Muckraker (2016) and also appeared as a regular guest on The John Oakley Show on Talk 640 until 2018. She was previously a panellist on CBC Radio One's local Toronto afternoon drive show Here and Now, as well as an occasional commentator or panellist over various cable news channels.

Levy announced her retirement from the Toronto Sun on June 26, 2021. She subsequently joined the True North Centre for Public Policy, a far-right online publication, as a contributor.

== Politics ==
In 2009, Levy was the Progressive Conservative Party of Ontario's by-election candidate in the Toronto riding of St. Paul's, placing second with 28.33% of the vote behind the Liberal victor, Eric Hoskins. She has undergone major criticisms for attacking the Indigenous, Muslim and Black communities by writing smear pieces via the Toronto Sun. A right wing, white Nationalist news paper

Ontario provincial by-election, September 17, 2009: St. Paul's Resignation of Michael Bryant
| Party | Candidate | Votes | % | ±% |
|---|---|---|---|---|
| Liberal | Eric Hoskins | 13,181 | | |
| Progressive Conservative | Sue-Ann Levy | 7,851 | | |
| New Democratic | Julian Heller | 4,691 | | |
| Green | Chris Chopik | 1,516 | | |
| Libertarian | John Kittredge | 160 | | |
| Special Needs | Danish Ahmed | 96 | | |
| Independent | Marius Frederick | 84 | | |
| Freedom | Paul McKeever | 61 | | |
| Independent | John Turmel | 47 | | |
| Independent | Raj Rama | 24 | | |
| Voter Turnout | | 27,830 | | |
| Liberal hold | | Swing | | |
Source(s) Official Return from the Records - 2009 By Election%C2%A0(ED077) - 077 ST. PAUL'S.pdf, available for download at https://results.elections.on.ca/en/publications, by Elections Ontario.

== Personal life ==
Levy is Jewish and an openly gay conservative. She came out publicly in 2007 and married her wife Denise Alexander in 2009.
