= Villaume =

Villaume or Villaumé is a surname. Notable people with the surname include:

- Astrid Villaume (1923–1995), Danish actress
- Emmanuel Villaume (born 1964), French conductor
- Farid Villaume (born 1975), French Muay Thai kickboxer
- Henri La Fayette Villaume Ducoudray Holstein (1772–1839), American writer, journalist and French army officer in the Napoleonic Wars
- Jean-Michel Villaumé (born 1946), French politician
- William Villaume (1914–1995), American Lutheran clergyman
