= John Fraser (journalist) =

Canadian journalist, writer and academic

John Fraser CM

4th Master of Massey College
- In office 1995–2014
- Preceded by: Ann Saddlemyer
- Succeeded by: Hugh Segal

Personal details
- Born: John Anderson Fraser; June 5, 1944 (age 82) Montreal, Quebec, Canada
- Spouse: Elizabeth MacCallum
- Children: 3 daughters
- Occupation: Journalist, writer, academic
- Awards: Order of Canada

John Anderson Fraser CM (born June 5, 1944) is a Canadian journalist, writer and academic. He served as Master of Massey College in the University of Toronto from 1995 until his retirement in June 2014. He is currently the executive chair of the National NewsMedia Council of Canada.

As a journalist, Fraser received multiple national awards and chaired the Canadian Journalism Foundation until 2008. He initiated and taught a course on Canadian newspaper history at St. Michael's College, University of Toronto.

== Education ==
During his teenage years, Fraser attended four high schools: Toronto's Upper Canada College, Oakwood Collegiate Institute, Lakefield College School in Lakefield, Ontario, and Jarvis Collegiate Institute. A classmate of his at Upper Canada College was Conrad Black who, years later, was his employer when Fraser was editor of Saturday Night magazine. He subsequently received a Bachelor of Arts degree from Memorial University and a Master of Arts degree from the University of East Anglia.

== Career ==
=== Journalism ===
At 16, Fraser started summer work as a copy boy and junior reporter at the Toronto Telegram and in following summers worked as a journalist at the Sherbrooke Daily Record and the St. John's Evening Telegram. In 1971, he was named music and dance critic for the Toronto Telegram and, after that newspaper's demise, was briefly in the same position at the Toronto Sun. He has also written regular columns for the Toronto Star and the National Post. From 1972 to 1987, he was a dance critic, theatre critic, China correspondent, Ottawa bureau chief, national columnist, national editor and London correspondent at The Globe and Mail. From 1987 to 1994, he was the editor of Saturday Night magazine where he pioneered the use of mixed circulation with inserted copies in The Globe and Mail and other newspapers in the old Southam Newspaper Group across Canada, with circulation increasing from 115,000 to 400,000. He also began a "Saturday Night" imprint of books with the publishers HarperCollins Ltd. that produced nearly two dozen titles in five years.

Fraser's journalism has been published in many leading international journals and newspapers, including The New York Times, The Washington Post, the Christian Science Monitor, The Guardian, The Daily Telegraph, Time, The New Republic, George, The Spectator, Paris Match and the Far Eastern Economic Review.

Much later, two years after retiring from Massey College in June 2015, he returned to the world of journalism as the founding President and CEO of the National NewsMedia Council of Canada, formed from five former press councils across the country. In that role, he forged a new media dispute resolution organization that now represents over 500 daily and weekly newspapers, digital news media platforms, magazines, and campus publications. In 2018, he was named the first Executive Chair of the NNC.

=== Massey College ===
In 1995, Fraser was elected the master of Massey College and chair of its governing corporation to a seven-year term and was subsequently re-elected to two further seven-year terms. Among his achievements at Massey were a $3.5-million renovation to the Robertson Davies Library, St. Catherine's Chapel and handicap access to the college. Other achievements include increasing its endowment to approximately $12,000,000 ($7,577,184 in the college's 2005 tax return and $4,000,000 held for student bursaries at the U of T's School of Graduate Studies). Other achievements include tripling the number of senior fellows and increasing the number of non-resident junior fellows; creating bursary support to non-resident junior fellows; pioneering academic support programs for "Writers in Exile" and "Scholars at Risk"; and establishing the Quadrangle Society in 1997 which extended the college's mandate to be a bridge community between "town and gown". The Quadrangle Society originally started with 99 (one fewer member than the Junior Fellowship at the suggestion of the then don of hall, Marc Ozon), and has now expanded to over 200. He has taught university courses at York University (drama criticism) and the University of Toronto (Canadian culture, and currently the history of Canadian newspapers). At Massey, he founded the Canadian Institute for the Study of the Crown in Canada. In addition, he led the process that saw the College’s St. Catherine’s Chapel named by Queen Elizabeth as the third “chapel royal” in Canada following an association with the Mississaugas of the New Credit First Nation. Fraser retired as master of Massey College in 2014 when he was named Master Emeritus and was appointed Founding Patron of the Quadrangle Society. He was succeeded by Hugh Segal, retired Senator from Ontario.

=== Awards ===
Fraser has received honorary degrees from Memorial University of Newfoundland (D.Litt.), University of King's College in Halifax, Nova Scotia (D.C.L.), York University in Toronto (LL.D.), and Trinity College in the University of a Toronto (D.S.L). He has received medals from the Queen (Silver Jubilee, 1977; Golden Jubilee, 2002; Diamond Jubilee 2012) and also the 1967 Centennial medal. In journalism, he has won three National Newspaper Awards, seven National Magazine Awards, and "Editor of the Year" from the Canadian Magazine Editors Society. His book, The Chinese: Portrait of a People was a Book-of-the-Month Club main choice in 1981 and was nominated for the Governor General's Literary Award in non-fiction. A book on the American Ballet Theatre and Mikhail Baryshnikov, Private View, was a Book-of-the-Month Club alternate choice in 1989 and won a Dance Magazine "book of the year" award. In 2001, he was made a Member of the Order of Canada. For his professional lifetime in journalism, he was named to the Canadian News Hall of Fame (2016) and later, in 2020, he was awarded the rarely-bestowed lifetime achievement Michener-Baxter Special Award for public service journalism.

== Personal life ==
Fraser is married to Elizabeth MacCallum, and the couple have three daughters and one grandson. He is a committed Anglican, and has served as both a Sunday school teacher and as rector's warden at his former church, St. Clement's, Eglinton, in Toronto, and as a Sunday school teacher at St. James Cathedral. As the founder and first president of the Institute for the Study of the Crown in Canada (housed at Massey College in the University of Toronto), he remains a committed monarchist.

== Selected bibliography ==
- Kain and Augustyn, 1977
- The Chinese: Portrait of a People, 1980
- Telling Tales, 1985
- Saturday Night Lives! Selected Diaries, 1995.
- Stolen China (novel), 1996
- Eminent Canadians: Candid Tales of Then and Now, 2000
- Mad About the Bay (with Elizabeth MacCallum), 2004 ISBN 978-1-5526-3274-1.
- The Secret of the Crown: Canada's Affair with Royalty, 2012, House of Anansi Press, Toronto, ISBN 978-1-77089-035-0
- The Master’s Menagerie: Gaudy Night Bedtime Stories, 2014, The Battered Box Press, Toronto, ISBN 978-1-55246-942-2.
