= Tim Louis =

Canadian politician

Tim Louis MP
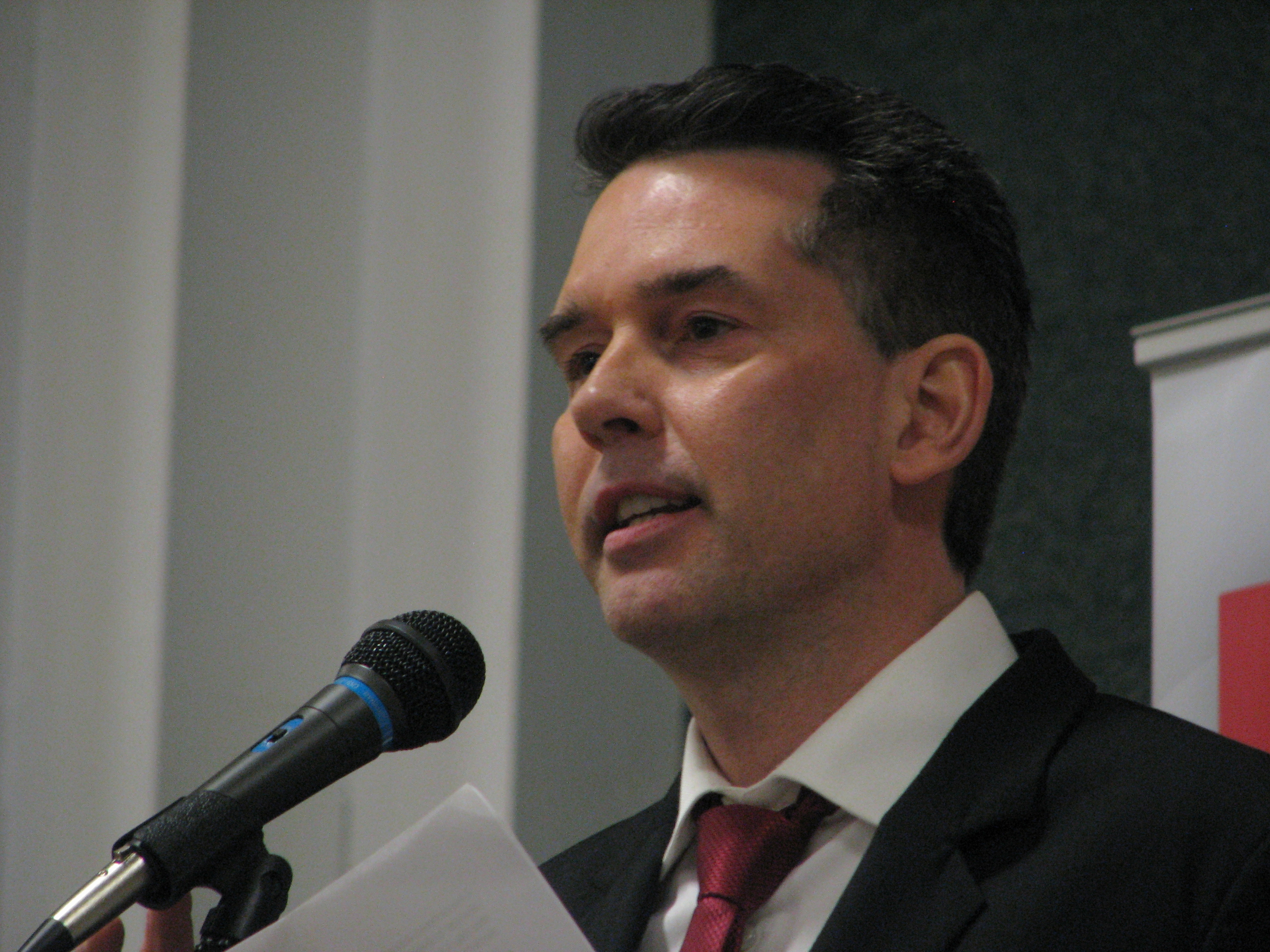
- Louis in 2015

Member of Parliament for Kitchener—Conestoga
- Incumbent
- Assumed office October 21, 2019
- Preceded by: Harold Albrecht

Personal details
- Born: 1968 or 1969 (age 56–57) Cliffside Park, New Jersey, U.S.
- Party: Liberal
- Education: Rutgers University (BA)

Tim Louis MP (born 1969) is an American-Canadian Liberal politician and musician first elected as a member of Parliament in the House of Commons of Canada to represent the federal riding Kitchener—Conestoga during the 2019 Canadian federal election, defeating incumbent Harold Albrecht.

== Music ==
Born in New Jersey, Louis is a jazz singer and pianist. He began playing the piano at five, eventually studying and graduating in 1991 with a Bachelor of Arts degree in music from Rutgers University, where he studied under jazz pianist Kenny Barron. After graduation Louis pursued further study in elementary education and, at the same time, a music career, playing with an Italian wedding band and a touring rock and roll band, Soul Engines, that opened for bands including Hootie and the Blowfish but whose debut album produced by Teo Macero was scuttled when its independent label folded.

Louis then relocated to his future spouse's native Kitchener, in 1994, and married on September 21, 1995. He toured with Canadian country music artists including Lace and Jamie Warren, with whom he won a 2002 SOCAN Songwriter of the Year award for the single Sunny Day in the Park, and later recorded a series of jazz albums, including Til it be Tomorrow (2006), Untrue (2009), Snowflakes in Bloom (2010), Snapshots (2012), and Bittersweet (2019). Between 2012 and 2019, Louis hosted a jazz radio program, Tim's Jazz Sessions, on Centre Wellington station CICW-FM, based on which he also developed two pilot television episodes.

== Politics ==
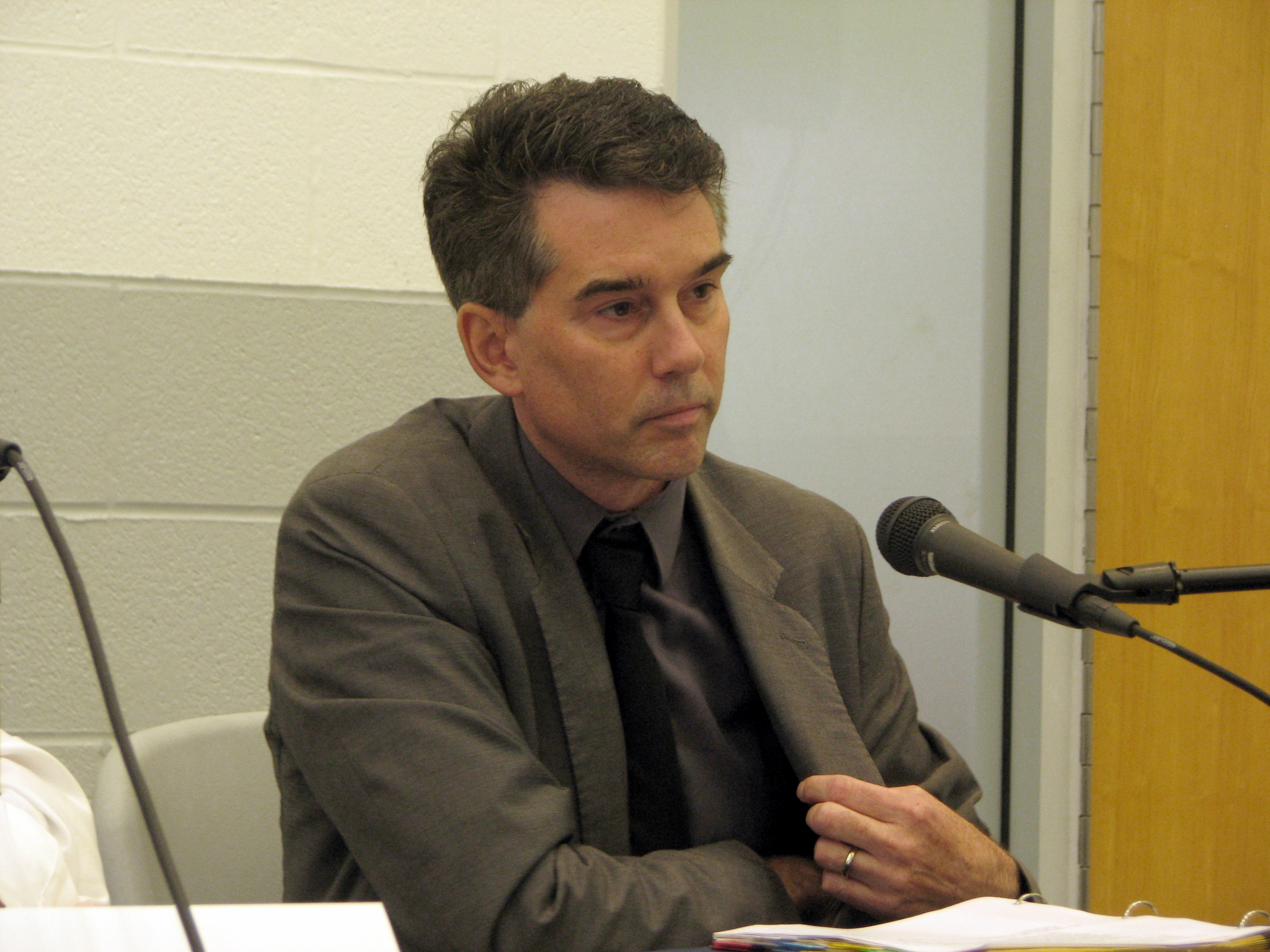
Louis at a debate during the 2015 election

In 2015, Louis ran unsuccessfully against Conservative incumbent Harold Albrecht, who had held the seat since 2006. During the following election, in 2019, Louis unseated Albrecht, but was not confirmed as the winner in his electoral district until the next morning. Clerical errors in five polls prevented them from being opened and counted for over 12 hours. Louis told CBC News that his victory in 2019 stemmed from a greater understanding of his riding, including issues such as affordability, climate change, and health care. He was re-elected to a second term in 2021 and a third in 2025.

Since his election, Louis has served on numerous parliamentary committees, including the COVID-19 pandemic, Canadian heritage, and agriculture and agri-Food committees.

== Electoral record ==
2025 Canadian federal election: Kitchener—Conestoga
Party	Candidate	Votes	%	±%	Expenditures
Liberal	Tim Louis	30,001	48.32	+10.03	$118,711.52
Conservative	Doug Treleaven	29,479	47.48	+9.84	$126,827.10
New Democratic	Maya Bozorgzad	1,821	2.93	–9.00	$1,920.84
People's	Kevin Dupuis	786	1.27	–5.95	$7,562.96
Total valid votes/expense limit		62,087	99.55	+0.15	$128,057.38
Total rejected ballots		283	0.45	–0.15	
Turnout		62,370	74.22	+5.92	
Eligible voters		84,029			
Liberal notional hold		Swing		+0.10	
Source: Elections Canada

2021 Canadian federal election: Kitchener—Conestoga
Party	Candidate	Votes	%	±%	Expenditures
Liberal	Tim Louis	20,025	39.3	−0.4	$87,010.06
Conservative	Carlene Hawley	19,448	38.2	−0.8	$102,975.68
New Democratic	Narine Dat Sookram	5,948	11.7	+1.6	$3,366.91
People's	Kevin Dupuis	3,690	7.2	+5.7	$7,913.55
Green	Owen Bradley	1,842	3.6	−6.0	$6,206.36
Total valid votes		50,953	99.4		
Total rejected ballots		290	0.6		
Turnout		51,243	68.3		
Eligible voters		75,079			
Liberal hold		Swing		+0.2	
Source: Elections Canada

2019 Canadian federal election: Kitchener—Conestoga
Party	Candidate	Votes	%	±%	Expenditures
Liberal	Tim Louis	20,480	39.7	−3.15	$78,912.65
Conservative	Harold Albrecht	20,115	39.0	−4.22	$90,924.77
New Democratic	Riani De Wet	5,204	10.1	+0.4	none listed
Green	Stephanie Goertz	4,946	9.6	+6.88	none listed
People's	Koltyn Wallar	790	1.5	–	$0.00
Total valid votes/expense limit		51,535	100.0		
Total rejected ballots		361			
Turnout		51,896	69.6	−0.24	
Eligible voters		74,562			
Liberal gain from Conservative		Swing		+0.54	
Source: Elections Canada

2015 Canadian federal election
Party	Candidate	Votes	%	±%	Expenditures
Conservative	Harold Albrecht	20,649	43.29	−11.12	$126,202.90
Liberal	Tim Louis	20,398	42.76	+19.29	$65,863.92
New Democratic	James Villeneuve	4,653	9.75	−8.50	$13,161.73
Green	Bob Jonkman	1,314	2.75	−0.89	$1,743.36
Libertarian	Richard Hodgson	685	1.44	–	–
Total valid votes/Expense limit		47,699	100.00		$202,562.28
Total rejected ballots		227	0.47	–	
Turnout		47,926	69.84	–	
Eligible voters		68,623			
Conservative hold		Swing		−15.21	
Source: Elections Canada
