= Kitchener—Conestoga (federal electoral district) =

Federal electoral district in Ontario, Canada

Ontario electoral district
- Interactive map of riding boundaries from the 2025 federal election

Federal electoral district
- Legislature: House of Commons
MP
Tim Louis
Liberal
- District created: 2003
- First contested: 2004
- Last contested: 2025
- District webpage: profile, map

Demographics
- Population (2021): 107,134
- Electors (2021): 75,079
- Area (km²): 896.18
- Pop. density (per km²): 119.5
- Census division: Waterloo
- Census subdivision(s): Kitchener (part), Woolwich, Wilmot, Wellesley

Kitchener—Conestoga (formerly known as Kitchener—Wilmot—Wellesley—Woolwich) is a federal electoral district in Ontario, Canada, that has been represented in the House of Commons of Canada since 2004. Its population in 2021 was 107,134. The riding is currently represented by Liberal MP Tim Louis. In the 2019 election, this was one of only two ridings in the country in which the Liberal candidate unseated the Conservative incumbent (the other being Milton).

== Geography ==
The district includes the townships of Woolwich, Wellesley and Wilmot, and the southwestern part of the City of Kitchener, i.e., the part of the City of Kitchener lying west of Fischer-Hallman Road.

The electoral district was created in 2003 from Waterloo—Wellington, part of Kitchener Centre, and part of Cambridge. It was known as "Kitchener—Wilmot—Wellesley—Woolwich" from 2004 to 2005.

This riding lost almost half of its territory to Kitchener South—Hespeler but gained territory from Kitchener Centre, Kitchener—Waterloo and a fraction from Wellington—Halton Hills during the 2012 electoral redistribution.

== Demographics ==
According to the 2021 Canadian census

Ethnic groups: 77.5% White, 6.9% South Asian, 2.8% Black, 2.4% Southeast Asian, 2.1% Indigenous, 1.9% Arab, 1.9% Latin American, 1.3% Chinese

Languages: 70.8% English, 3.5% German, 2.6% Pennsylvania German, 1.6% Punjabi, 1.5% Spanish, 1.4% Arabic, 1.2% Romanian, 1.1% Serbian

Religions: 59.5% Christian (20.0% Catholic, 7.9% Anabaptist, 4.4% Lutheran, 3.5% United Church, 2.7% Christian Orthodox, 2.4% Anglican, 1.7% Presbyterian, 1.6% Pentecostal, 1.2% Baptist, 14.1% Other), 5.1% Muslim, 2.3% Hindu, 1.7% Sikh, 1.3% Buddhist, 29.5% None

Median income: $46,800 (2020)

Average income: $57,650 (2020)

== Members of Parliament ==
Parliament	Years	Member	Party
Kitchener—Conestoga; Riding created from Waterloo—Wellington, Kitchener Centre and Cambridge
38th	2004–2006	Lynn Myers	Liberal
39th	2006–2008	Harold Albrecht	Conservative
40th	2008–2011	Harold Albrecht	Conservative
41st	2011–2015	Harold Albrecht	Conservative
42nd	2015–2019	Harold Albrecht	Conservative
43rd	2019–2021	Tim Louis	Liberal
44th	2021–2025	Tim Louis	Liberal
45th	2025–present	Tim Louis	Liberal

== Election results ==
2025 Canadian federal election
Party	Candidate	Votes	%	±%	Expenditures
Liberal	Tim Louis	30,001	48.32	+10.03	$118,711.52
Conservative	Doug Treleaven	29,479	47.48	+9.84	$126,827.10
New Democratic	Maya Bozorgzad	1,821	2.93	–9.00	$1,920.84
People's	Kevin Dupuis	786	1.27	–5.95	$7,562.96
Total valid votes/expense limit		62,087	99.55	+0.15	$128,057.38
Total rejected ballots		283	0.45	–0.15	
Turnout		62,370	74.22	+5.92	
Eligible voters		84,029			
Liberal notional hold		Swing		+0.10	
Source: Elections Canada

2021 federal election redistributed results
Party	Vote	%
Liberal	20,489	38.29
Conservative	20,140	37.64
New Democratic	6,381	11.93
People's	3,865	7.22
Green	2,626	4.91
Others	8	0.01

2021 Canadian federal election
Party	Candidate	Votes	%	±%	Expenditures
Liberal	Tim Louis	20,025	39.3	-0.4	$87,010.06
Conservative	Carlene Hawley	19,448	38.2	-0.8	$102,975.68
New Democratic	Narine Dat Sookram	5,948	11.7	+1.6	$3,366.91
People's	Kevin Dupuis	3,690	7.2	+5.7	$7,913.55
Green	Owen Bradley	1,842	3.6	-6.0	$6,206.36
Total valid votes		50,953	99.4		
Total rejected ballots		290	0.6		
Turnout		51,243	68.3		
Eligible voters		75,079			
Liberal hold		Swing		+0.2	
Source: Elections Canada

2019 Canadian federal election
Party	Candidate	Votes	%	±%	Expenditures
Liberal	Tim Louis	20,480	39.7	-3.15	$78,912.65
Conservative	Harold Albrecht	20,115	39.0	-4.22	$90,924.77
New Democratic	Riani De Wet	5,204	10.1	+0.4	none listed
Green	Stephanie Goertz	4,946	9.6	+6.88	none listed
People's	Koltyn Wallar	790	1.5	–	$0.00
Total valid votes/expense limit		51,535	100.0		
Total rejected ballots		361			
Turnout		51,896	69.6	-0.24	
Eligible voters		74,562			
Liberal gain from Conservative		Swing		+0.54	
Source: Elections Canada

2015 Canadian federal election
Party	Candidate	Votes	%	±%	Expenditures
Conservative	Harold Albrecht	20,649	43.29	-11.12	$126,202.90
Liberal	Tim Louis	20,398	42.76	+19.29	$65,863.92
New Democratic	James Villeneuve	4,653	9.75	-8.50	$13,161.73
Green	Bob Jonkman	1,314	2.75	-0.89	$1,743.36
Libertarian	Richard Hodgson	685	1.44	–	–
Total valid votes/Expense limit		47,699	100.00		$202,562.28
Total rejected ballots		227	0.47	–	
Turnout		47,926	69.84	–	
Eligible voters		68,623			
Conservative hold		Swing		-15.21	
Source: Elections Canada

2011 federal election redistributed results
Party	Vote	%
Conservative	21,914	54.41
Liberal	9,454	23.47
New Democratic	7,350	18.25
Green	1,469	3.65
Others	86	0.21

2011 Canadian federal election
Party	Candidate	Votes	%	±%	Expenditures
Conservative	Harold Albrecht	28,902	54.12	+4.80	$87,677.43
New Democratic	Lorne Bruce	11,665	21.84	+6.81	$9,277.86
Liberal	Robert Rosehart	10,653	19.95	-4.94	–
Green	Albert Ashley	2,184	4.09	-6.65	–
Total valid votes/Expense limit		53,404	100.00	$92,867.94	
Total rejected ballots		171	0.32	0.00	
Turnout		53,575	61.10	+4.58	
Eligible voters		87,689	–	–	
Conservative hold		Swing		+5.80	

2008 Canadian federal election
Party	Candidate	Votes	%	±%	Expenditures
Conservative	Harold Albrecht	23,525	49.32	+8.10	$84,798
Liberal	Orlando Da Silva	11,876	24.89	-13.59	$75,077
New Democratic	Rod McNeil	7,173	15.03	+0.15	$6,494
Green	Jamie Kropf	5,124	10.74	+5.33	$33,066
Total valid votes/Expense limit		47,698	100.00	$88,113	
Total rejected ballots		153	0.32		
Turnout		47,851	56.52		
Conservative hold		Swing		+10.85	

2006 Canadian federal election
Party	Candidate	Votes	%	±%
Conservative	Harold Albrecht	20,615	41.22	+5.86
Liberal	Lynn Myers	19,245	38.48	-3.80
New Democratic	Len Carter	7,443	14.88	-0.83
Green	Kris Stapleton	2,706	5.41	-1.22
Total valid votes		50,009	100.00	
Conservative gain from Liberal		Swing		+4.83

2004 Canadian federal election
Party	Candidate	Votes	%
Liberal	Lynn Myers	17,819	42.29
Conservative	Frank Luellau	14,903	35.37
New Democratic	Len Carter	6,623	15.72
Green	Kris Stapleton	2,793	6.63
Total valid votes		42,138	100.00

== See also ==
- List of Canadian electoral districts
- Historical federal electoral districts of Canada
- Kitchener—Conestoga (provincial electoral district)
- Kitchener—Wilmot
