= Kenneth Tam =

Canadian science-fiction author (born 1984)

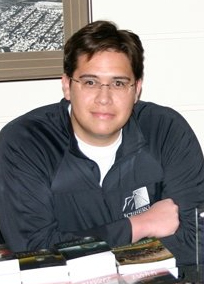
- Kenneth Tam, as seen at the second Sci-Fi on the Rock convention in April 2008.
- Born: July 9, 1984 (age 42); St. John's, Newfoundland and Labrador, Canada
- Occupation: Novelist
- Writing career
- Genres: Science fiction, Alternate History
- Website: www.icebergpublishing.com

Kenneth Tam (born 1984 in St. John's, Newfoundland and Labrador) is a Canadian science-fiction author. His best-known works include The Equations Novels and the Defense Command series. He is the son of fellow Canadian author Jacqui Tam. He is a graduate student at Wilfrid Laurier University, in Waterloo, Ontario. Tam has been an author guest at the Polaris Science Fiction Convention for six consecutive years, and a guest at the Sci-Fi on the Rock convention for its first three years.

== Awards ==
In 2002, Tam won the Governor General's Academic Medal for exceptional achievement in high school. In 2006 Kenneth was awarded a Balsillie Fellowship at the Centre for International Governance Innovation and worked for Canadian former ambassador to the United Nations, Paul Heinbecker.

== Bibliography ==
=== Fiction ===
- The Human Equation (2005) (ISBN 0-9731362-4-3)
- The Alien Equation (2005) (ISBN 0-9731362-5-1)
- The Renegade Equation (2005) (ISBN 0-9731362-6-X)
- The Earther Equation (2005) (ISBN 0-9731362-7-8)
- The Genesis Equation (2006) (ISBN 0-9731362-9-4)
- The Vengeance Equation (2007) (ISBN 978-0-9780916-8-2)
- The Nemesis Equation (2008) (ISBN) (ISBN 978-0-9784902-4-9)
- The Destiny Equation (2009) (ISBN) (ISBN 978-0-9784902-8-7)
- The Rogue Commodore (2006) (ISBN 0-9780916-0-4)
- The Almost Coup (2006) (ISBN 0-9780916-1-2)
- The Hawke Mission (2006) (ISBN 0-9780916-3-9)
- The Independent Squadron (2006) (ISBN 0-9780916-4-7)
- The Gallant Few (2007) (ISBN 978-0-9780916-6-8)
- The Jupiter Patrol (2007) (ISBN 978-0-9780916-7-5)
- The Sinope Affair (2007) (ISBN 978-0-9780916-9-9)
- The Dark Cruise (2007) (ISBN 978-0-9784902-0-1)
- The Canary Wars (2008)
- The Forge Fires (2008)
- The Mercury Assault (2009) (ISBN 978-0-9784902-5-6)
- The Fleet Clash (2009) (ISBN 978-0-9784902-6-3)
- The Grasslands (2008) (ISBN 978-0-9784902-1-8)
- The Frontier (2009) (ISBN 978-0-9784902-7-0)

=== Non-fiction ===
- NewFoundSpecFic #1 (2009) (ISBN 978-0-9784342-4-3) (Introduction)

== Defense Command ==
Defense Command is a series of novels written by Canadian author Kenneth Tam, starting in 2006. The series incorporates themes from multiple genres, including science fiction, fantasy fiction, and horror fiction elements. They describe the life and career of a Commodore Ken Barron in Defense Command during the Martian Wars spanning the years 2231–2235, as told from the perspective Admiral the Lord Ken Barron 2251. Tam has described the series as his magnum opus, being based on the first stories he ever wrote.

The series was chiefly inspired by science-fiction media such as The Avengers and Stargate SG-1, and has drawn comparisons to those works by readers. Tam's style of equipment names in the series, such as Gander or Sackville, and his development the worlds and locations, are influenced by his Canadian nationality as well as his Newfoundland heritage.

=== Plot summary ===
The story is told from the unique perspective of Admiral the Lord Ken Barron in the year 2251, looking back on his years just after promotion to commodore in the year 2231. The series is a fictional historical memorial of the events leading up to and including The Martian War, taking place between the years 2231 and 2235 and encompassing the first twenty books of the series.

It has been announced that the Defense Command series will continue after the completion of The Martian War for at least a further four books taking place in the year 2240 and telling a sequence of events referred to only as Operation Epsilon.

=== Characters in the series ===
As with all of Tam's novels, inspiration for characters comes from many sources including real-life political figures, fellow Iceberg employees, fellow Canadian authors and fictional characters from his favorite works of fiction.

The character of Wes Pellew has been reported to be based on Iceberg author and artist of the Defense Command series Wesley Prewer.

=== Places ===
A native Newfoundlander, Tam includes many references to the island in the majority of his works. The most notable example of this in the Defense Command series is in the second novel The Almost Coup, when lead character Ken Barron describes the location of the island headquarters of Defense Command and inadvertently describes the exact location of the island province of Newfoundland.

=== Story within a story ===
By maintaining the events of the narrative as actual events even within Iceberg press release form and author interviews, Tam has endeavored to create a level of 'suspended disbelief' in the events surrounding The Martian War.

Events in the series are portrayed as the first 'real' account of The Martian War, following many motion pictures and novels based on the time period that have not met the praise of the titular character. Tam often references the 'historically inaccurate' nature of the films when describing the events taking place in the narrative, notably in The Hawke Mission and The Independent Squadron

=== Series ===
1. The Martian War: The Rogue Commodore (2006)
2. The Martian War II: The Almost Coup (2006)
3. The Martian War III: The Hawke Mission (2006)
4. The Martian War IV: The Independent Squadron (2006)
5. The Martian War V: The Gallant Few (2007)
6. The Martian War VI: The Jupiter Patrol (2007)
7. The Martian War VII: The Sinope Affair (2007)
8. The Martian War VIII: The Dark Cruise (2007)
9. The Martian War IX: The Canary Wars (2008)
10. The Martian War X: The Forge Fires (2008)
11. The Martian War XI: The Mercury Assault (2009)
12. The Martian War XII: The Fleet Clash (2009)

=== Connections to Tam's other works ===
Links to other novels written by Tam and published by Iceberg have been hinted at in the pages of Defense Command, most notably to Tam's first, highly successful Equations series.
