= Robert Rosehart =

Canadian engineer (born 1943)

- Born: 29 June 1943 (age 83); Owen Sound, Ontario
- Education: University of Waterloo (BASc '67, MASc '68, PhD '70)
- Spouse: Rita June Purvis (m. 1967)

Robert George Rosehart (born 29 June 1943) is a Canadian chemical engineer and university executive.

Born in Owen Sound, Ontario, he received a B.A.Sc. degree in 1966, a M.A.Sc. in 1968, and a Ph.D. in 1976 from the University of Waterloo.

In 1987, he became the President of Lakehead University and in 1999 he became President of Wilfrid Laurier University. Rosehart served as interim principal of Renison University College from 2008-2009 and was later made an Honorary Senior Fellow of the college in 2012.

Rosehart ran in the 2011 federal election for the Liberal Party of Canada in the riding of Kitchener-Conestoga, and lost to incumbent Harold Albrecht.

== Electoral record ==
2011 Canadian federal election
Party	Candidate	Votes	%	±%	Expenditures
Conservative	Harold Albrecht	28,902	54.12	+4.80	$87,677.43
New Democratic	Lorne Bruce	11,665	21.84	+6.81	$9,277.86
Liberal	Robert Rosehart	10,653	19.95	-4.94	–
Green	Albert Ashley	2,184	4.09	-6.65	–
Conservative hold		Swing		+5.80	
Total valid votes/Expense limit		53,404	100.00	$92,867.94	
Total rejected ballots		171	0.32	0.00	
Turnout		53,575	61.10	+4.58	
Eligible voters		87,689	–	–	

== See also ==
- List of University of Waterloo people

Academic offices
Preceded by Lorna Marsden	President of Wilfrid Laurier University; 1997 - 2007	Succeeded by Dr. Max Blouw
