= Ontario Press Council =

The Ontario Press Council was a voluntary media adjudication body which investigates complaints about newspapers in Ontario, Canada. On September 1, 2015, it was amalgamated into the newly formed National Newsmedia Council.

== History ==
The council was founded in 1972 with Davidson Dunton as its founding chair. The immediate past chair was Robert G. Elgie who lead the council from 2006 until his death in 2013.

228 newspapers ranging from metropolitan dailies to community monthlies were members of the council as of the beginning of 2009. However, in July 2011, Sun Media withdrew 27 of its titles from the Ontario Press Council citing concerns over 'political correctness', leaving the council with only 10 daily newspapers and 191 community newspapers.
