= True North Centre for Public Policy =

Canadian conservative outlet

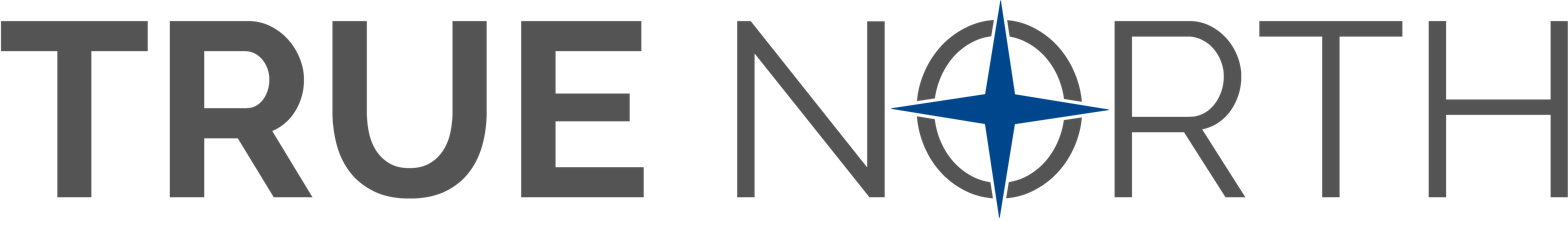
- Predecessor: Independent Immigration Aid Association
- Headquarters: Calgary, Alberta
- Editor-in-chief: Candice Malcolm
- Website: tnc.news

The True North Centre for Public Policy is a Canadian conservative media outlet, advocacy organization, and registered charity. It operated the True North digital media arm. In 2025, they rebranded to Juno News.

== History ==
True North was founded by Candice Malcolm, a former spokesperson for Jason Kenney and the Canadian Taxpayers’ Federation, in 2016, and was initially described as an “immigration-focused research and education group”.

In 2017, Malcolm led a new board of directors who took control of the Independent Immigration Aid Association, which was started in 1994 to help immigrants from the United Kingdom settle in British Columbia. They renamed it the True North Centre for Public Policy, and control was handed off to three people:

- Kaz Nejatian, a former staffer for United Conservative Party leader Jason Kenney, husband to Malcolm, and current CEO of Opendoor.
- William McBeath, the director of Training and Marketing for the right-wing Manning Centre for Building Democracy.
- Erynne Schuster, an Edmonton-based lawyer.

When the immigration-focused charity was transformed into a media and research organization, the change was scrutinized in the Canadian legal field. True North's filings with Canada Revenue Agency state that the organization runs "ongoing programs" that provide "support and assistance to UK immigrants to the Lower Mainland, Vancouver Island and the rest of British Columbia", that it has "new programs" dedicated to "research on immigration and integration", and that 100% of True North's programs emphasized "immigrant aid".

In 2019, Canadian columnist Lindsay Shepherd joined True North as an investigative journalist.

During the 2019 federal election in Canada, True North was initially denied press access to the leaders' debate because it was not a news outlet but an advocacy organization. True North argued that the decision to bar them was "unfair and arbitrary."True North contested this decision to bar them, and brought the Leader's Debates Commission to court. The federal judge, Justice Russell Zinn, ruled in favour of True North, and forced the government to allow them to attend the debate and ask questions as journalists. The same year, Toula Drimonis described True North as "fake news" in her editorial in Cult MTL.

In July 2021, Canadian conservative writer and political columnist Sue Ann Levy announced she was joining True North.

In 2022, the charity reported $2 million in revenue. Malcom later revealed to Press Progress that she and her husband are one of the largest donor to True North. Another donor is former SNC Lavalin Chairman Gwyn Morgan, who has given True North half-a-million dollars through his foundation.

In 2023, True North's website published a video featuring presenter Harrison Faulkner, in which Faulkner claimed that the Canadian government was hiding the true cause of the 2023 Canadian wildfires. Faulkner's claim that arson arrests showed arson was the real cause of the fires was debunked, mainly because he pointed to news articles that were published years before the 2023 fires started.

In 2024, True North published a piece by Harrison Faulkner defending the Proud Boys, a terrorist organization designated by the Canadian federal government. After Malcom was asked by Press Progress, she took the piece down from the site.

According to a post on Juno News, in 2025 some of True North's functions were transferred to Juno News, a site founded by Malcolm and Keean Bexte.
