= Harold Albrecht =

Canadian politician (born 1949)

Harold Glenn Albrecht
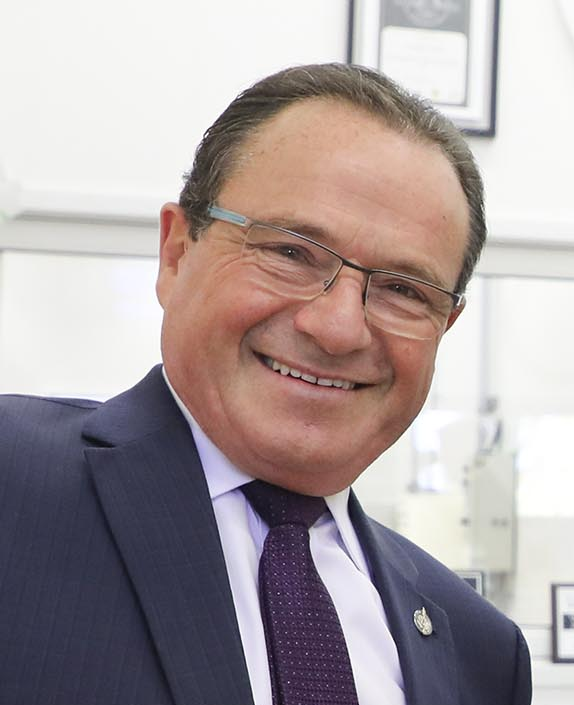
- Albrecht in 2017

Member of Parliament for Kitchener—Conestoga
- In office January 23, 2006 – October 19, 2019
- Preceded by: Lynn Myers
- Succeeded by: Tim Louis

Chair of the Standing Committee on The Environment
- In office 29 January 2013 – August 4, 2015
- Minister: Peter Kent; Leona Aglukkaq
- Preceded by: Mark Warawa
- Succeeded by: Deb Schulte

Personal details
- Born: October 15, 1949 (age 76) Kitchener, Ontario, Canada
- Party: Conservative
- Spouse(s): Betty Albrecht, 1972 - 2011 (her death); Darlene McLean, 2013 - present
- Profession: Dentist, farmer, pastor

Harold Glenn Albrecht (born October 15, 1949, in Kitchener, Ontario) was the Member of Parliament (MP) for the Conservative Party of Canada in the riding of Kitchener—Conestoga from 2006 until 2019. He defeated the incumbent Liberal MP, Lynn Myers, by just over 1,000 votes in the 2006 federal election to gain a seat in the House of Commons of Canada.

== Early years ==
Albrecht grew up in the riding in which he was elected and was educated in the Waterloo Region at Waterloo-Oxford District Secondary School, and then at Waterloo Lutheran University (which is now Wilfrid Laurier University). Albrecht went on to complete his Doctorate of Dental Surgery at the University of Toronto Faculty of Dentistry.

== Personal life ==
Albrecht owns a hobby farm in between Petersburg and New Dundee, and he and his wife Betty were married for 40 years. They have three children and nine grandchildren. On the night of May 2, 2011, Betty suffered a brain hemorrhage while they were preparing for his election victory party, and died two days later in hospital.

In July 2013, Albrecht married Darlene McLean.

== Before politics ==
Albrecht owned a private dental practice in the Kitchener region for twenty-seven years. During his dentistry career, Albrecht also lent his professional skills on many short-term Christian mission trips with the Christian Medical-Dental Society in Honduras and Dominican Republic, as well as trips to Venezuela, Colombia, Zambia, Nepal, and India.

Albrecht served as a school board trustee on the Waterloo County Board of Education from 1978 to 1982, and was the chair of the board from 1981 to 1982.

In 1999, Albrecht left his dentistry practice to found and pastor Pathway Community Church in the Doon area of Kitchener. The church started meeting in November of that year, with a small congregation of around 70 people. It also became the third Brethren in Christ church in the Kitchener-Waterloo area. Albrecht pastored the church until 2005, when he announced a leave of absence to seek the Conservative Party nomination in his riding. When he won the nomination, he permanently resigned his leadership position from the Church.

== Federal politics ==
Albrecht was the Member of Parliament for the riding of Kitchener-Conestoga in Canada's House of Commons. He held this seat from 2006 to 2019.

=== 2006 election ===
In 2006, Albrecht ran as the Conservative candidate in the riding of Kitchener-Conestoga. Albrecht won the election with 20,615 votes – 41.22% of the votes. He defeated Liberal incumbent, Lynn Myers, as well as NDP candidate, Len Carter and Green Party candidate Kristine Stapleton.

=== Committee work ===
In the 39th Parliament, Albrecht was a member of the Standing Committee on Government Operations and Estimates, the Standing Committee on Aboriginal Affairs and Northern Development, and the Legislative Committee on Bill C-2.

=== 2008 election ===
In 2008, Albrecht was re-elected as the Member of Parliament for the riding of Kitchener-Conestoga. Albrecht won with 23,525 votes – 49.32% of the votes, defeating Liberal candidate Orlando Da Silva, NDP candidate Rod Mcneil and Green Party candidate Jamie Kropf.

=== Committee work ===
In the 40th Parliament, Albrecht was a member of the Standing Committee on Procedure and House Affairs, the Subcommittee on Agenda and Procedure of the Standing Committee on Procedure and House Affairs, the Standing Committee on Aboriginal Affairs and Northern Development, the Standing Joint Committee on Scrutiny of Regulations and the Standing Committee on Access to Information, Privacy and Ethics.

Albrecht was also member and chair of the Subcommittee on Private Members' Business of the Standing Committee on Procedure and House Affairs.

=== Additional roles ===
On November 21, 2008, Prime Minister Stephen Harper named Albrecht Deputy Government Whip.

=== 2011 election ===
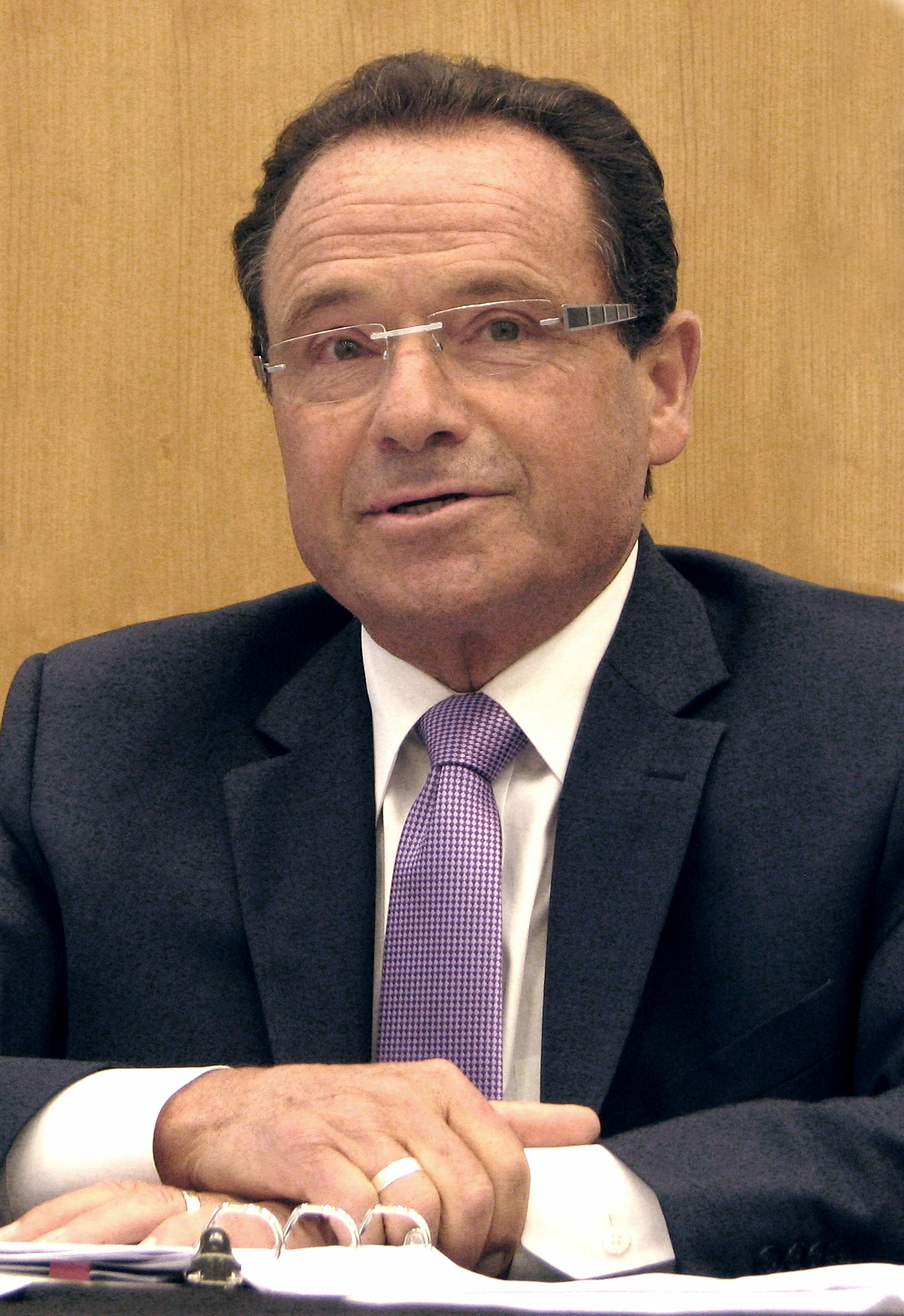
Albrecht participating in the Chamber of Commerce Debate in Elmira, Ontario during the 42nd Federal Election in 2015

On May 2, 2011, Albrecht was re-elected for the third consecutive election as the Member of Parliament for the riding of Kitchener-Conestoga. Albrecht received 28,902 votes – 54.12%, defeating NDP candidate Lorne Bruce, Liberal candidate Bob Rosehart and Green Party candidate Albert Ashley.

On the night of Albrecht's electoral win, his wife of nearly 40 years Betty Albrecht suffered an unexpected brain hemorrhage. She was hospitalized and died two days later at the Hamilton General Hospital.

=== Committee work ===
In the 41st Parliament, Albrecht has served as a member of the Standing Committee on Procedure and House Affairs, the Subcommittee on Agenda and Procedure of the Standing Committee on Procedure and House Affairs, the Subcommittee on International Human Rights of the Standing Committee on Foreign Affairs and International Development, the Liaison Committee, and the Standing Committee on Transport, Infrastructure and Communities.

Albrecht has also served as a member and chair on the Standing Committee on Environment and Sustainable Development, the Subcommittee on Agenda and Procedure of the Standing Committee on Environment and Sustainable Development, and the Subcommittee on Private Members’ Business of the Standing Committee on Procedure and House Affairs.

=== Additional roles ===
Albrecht was renamed the Deputy Government Whip on May 5, 2011, and served in this capacity until January 27, 2013.

=== Bill C-300 ===
In the 41st Parliament, Albrecht sponsored a Private Member's Bill - Bill C-300, An Act Respecting a Federal Framework for Suicide Prevention. Bill C-300 "establishes a requirement for the Government of Canada to develop a federal framework for suicide prevention in consultation with relevant non-governmental organizations, the relevant entity in each province and territory, as well with relevant federal department."

Albrecht's Bill C-300 received royal assent and came into force on December 14, 2014.

=== Additional parliamentary work ===
In his capacity as a parliamentarian, Albrecht was a member of the Auto Caucus, the Energy Caucus, the Rural Caucus, and the Pro-Life Caucus. Albrecht is also the founder and chair of the BioCaucus, a group of MPs who work to promote the production of agricultural and renewable technologies. Additionally, Albrecht is the Chair of the Canada-Armenia Parliamentary Friendship Group and the Chemical Caucus.

=== Opposition to the Pride flag ===
In 2017, Albrecht came out in opposition to flying the rainbow pride flag alongside the Canadian flag at Waterloo Region District School Board schools because of the improper flag-etiquette he suggested it would present: "Many of these flags are being flown on the same mast as our Canadian flag. This is a troubling practice as it diminishes the dignity and the honour of our flag. Flying two flags on the same mast also goes directly against proper flag protocol." However, before making the decision to fly the Pride flag, the WRDSB checked with the Government of Canada's flag protocol lead at Canadian Heritage who confirmed that where there is only one mast flying both flags on it is an acceptable workaround provided the Canadian flag is on top.

=== Electoral record ===
2019 Canadian federal election: Kitchener—Conestoga
Party	Candidate	Votes	%	±%	Expenditures
Liberal	Tim Louis	20,480	39.7	−3.15	$78,912.65
Conservative	Harold Albrecht	20,115	39.0	−4.22	$90,924.77
New Democratic	Riani De Wet	5,204	10.1	+0.4	none listed
Green	Stephanie Goertz	4,946	9.6	+6.88	none listed
People's	Koltyn Wallar	790	1.5	–	$0.00
Total valid votes/expense limit		51,535	100.0		
Total rejected ballots		361			
Turnout		51,896	69.6	−0.24	
Eligible voters		74,562			
Liberal gain from Conservative		Swing		+0.54	
Source: Elections Canada

2015 Canadian federal election
Party	Candidate	Votes	%	±%	Expenditures
Conservative	Harold Albrecht	20,649	43.3	-11.11	–
Liberal	Tim Louis	20,398	42.8	+19.33	–
New Democratic	James Villeneuve	4,653	9.8	-8.45	–
Green	Bob Jonkman	1,314	2.8	-0.85	–
Libertarian	Richard Hodgson	685	1.4	–	–
Total valid votes/Expense limit		47,699	100.0		$201,668.19
Total rejected ballots		227	–	–	
Turnout		47,926	–	–	
Eligible voters		67,890			
Conservative hold		Swing		-15.22	
Source: Elections Canada

2011 Canadian federal election
Party	Candidate	Votes	%	±%	Expenditures
Conservative	Harold Albrecht	28,902	54.12	+4.80	$87,677.43
New Democratic	Lorne Bruce	11,665	21.84	+6.81	$9,277.86
Liberal	Robert Rosehart	10,653	19.95	-4.94	–
Green	Albert Ashley	2,184	4.09	-6.65	–
Conservative hold		Swing		+5.80	
Total valid votes/Expense limit		53,404	100.00	$92,867.94	
Total rejected ballots		171	0.32	0.00	
Turnout		53,575	61.10	+4.58	
Eligible voters		87,689	–	–	

2008 Canadian federal election
Party	Candidate	Votes	%	±%	Expenditures
Conservative	Harold Albrecht	23,525	49.32	+8.10	$84,798
Liberal	Orlando Da Silva	11,876	24.89	-13.59	$75,077
New Democratic	Rod McNeil	7,173	15.03	+0.15	$6,494
Green	Jamie Kropf	5,124	10.74	+5.33	$33,066
Conservative hold		Swing		+10.85	
Total valid votes/Expense limit		47,698	100.00	$88,113	
Total rejected ballots		153	0.32		
Turnout		47,851	56.52		
Conservative hold		Swing		+10.85	

2006 Canadian federal election
Party	Candidate	Votes	%	±%
Conservative	Harold Albrecht	20,615	41.22	+5.86
Liberal	Lynn Myers	19,245	38.48	-3.80
New Democratic	Len Carter	7,443	14.88	-0.83
Green	Kris Stapleton	2,706	5.41	-1.22
Total valid votes		50,009	100.00	
Conservative gain from Liberal		Swing		+4.83
