= ATS Corporation =

Canadian factory automation company

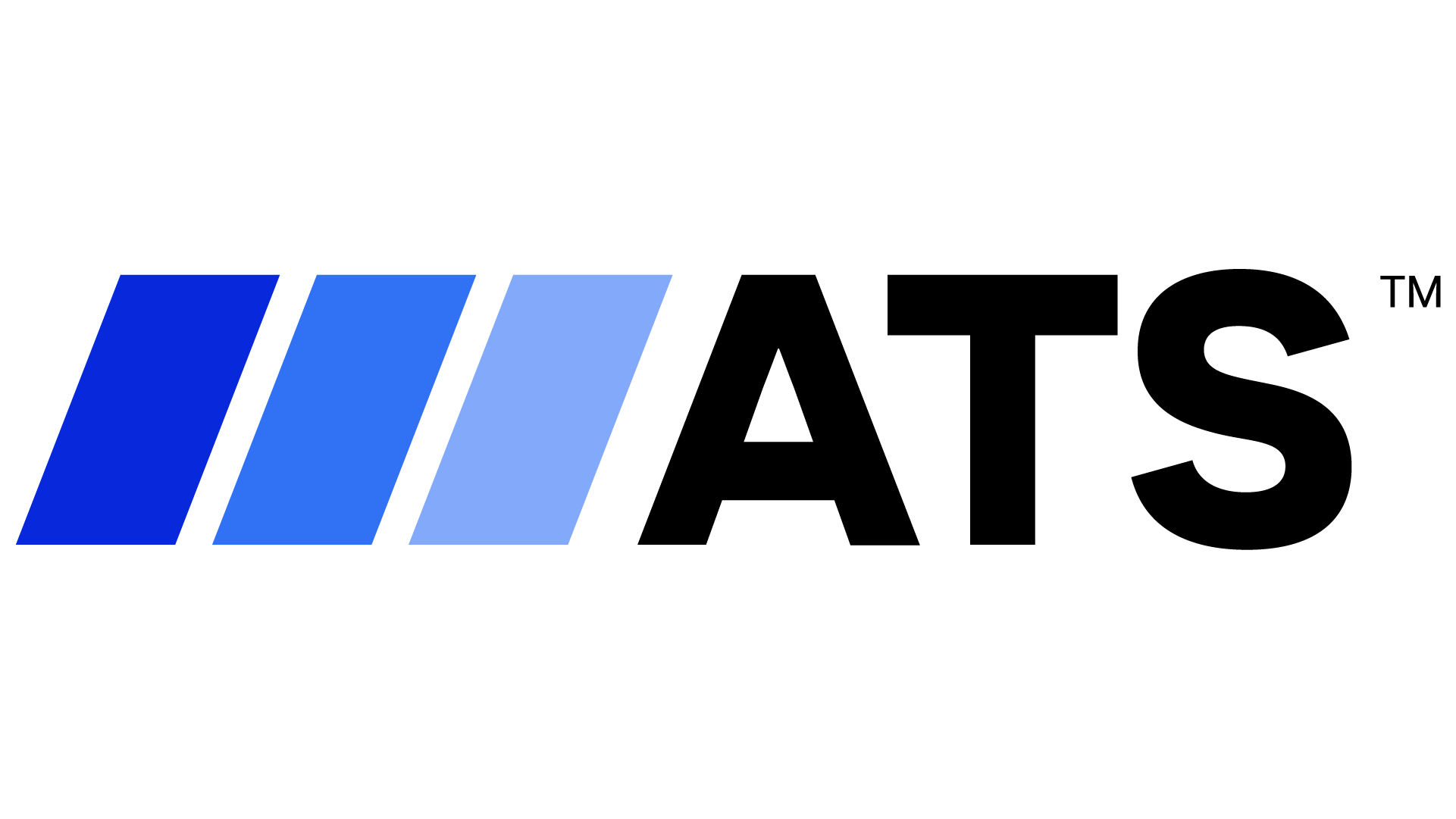
- Type: Public
- Traded as: TSX: ATS; NYSE: ATS
- Industry: Automated Machinery and Equipment
- Genre: Engineering and Manufacturing
- Founded: 1978
- Founder: Klaus Woerner
- Headquarters: 730 Fountain St N., Cambridge, Ontario, Canada
- Key people: Doug Wright (CEO since 2026)
- Revenue: 1.637 billion $ US (2025)
- Operating income: 228.47 millions $ US (2025)
- Net income: 64.6 millions $ US (2025)
- Number of employees: 7 500 employees (2025)
- Divisions: 20 facilities and 50 offices worldwide:
- Website: atsautomation.com

ATS Corporation is a Canadian company based in Cambridge, Ontario, that designs and builds factory automation systems. It is listed on the Toronto Stock Exchange.

== History ==
ATS was founded by Klaus Woerner in 1978. Woerner, who immigrated to Canada from Germany in 1974, ran the company until his death in 2005, overseeing significant growth. In 2007, ATS pulled the planned IPO of its solar division, Photowatt. Partially as a result of this, two hedge funds, Goodwood and Mason Capital Management, led a proxy fight against the firm, leading to a new board of directors and management team. Anthony Caputo became CEO at this time. Photowatt under-performed significantly in the years that followed; the company eventually sold Photowatt's French operations to EDF Group.

In 2011, ATS purchased Sortimat Group, a German life sciences automation firm, for $62 million. In 2013, they purchased the German packaging firm IWK for $144 million, and in 2014, they purchased the automation business of the German company M+W Group for $362 million.

In 2019, ATS acquired Comecer S.p.A, an Italian manufacturer of isolation technology solutions based in Castel Bolognese.

In September 2023, ATS acquired Avidity Science, a biomedical research and life sciences water purification equipment provider, for $195 million.

In December 2025, Doug Wright was appointed CEO of the company.

== Operations ==
ATS builds automation systems for the medical devices, pharmaceuticals, telecommunications, semiconductor, fiber optics, automotive, computers, solar energy and consumer products industries. As of 2018, they have designed and built 23,000 automation systems.

ATS employs approximately 6500 people worldwide, with 20 facilities in North America, Europe and Asia.
