= Lindsay Shepherd =

Canadian columnist (born 1994)

- Born: December 7, 1994 (age 31)
- Education: Simon Fraser University (BA); Wilfrid Laurier University (MA)
- Occupation: Columnist
- Known for: 2017 academic freedom dispute with Wilfrid Laurier University
- Political party: Conservative Party of British Columbia

Lindsay Shepherd (born December 7, 1994) is a Canadian columnist who is a regular contributor to the True North Centre for Public Policy, a conservative media outlet. She received national attention in 2017 for her involvement, as a graduate student and teaching assistant, in an academic freedom dispute at Wilfrid Laurier University (WLU) in Waterloo, Ontario.

In November 2017, Shepherd played her communications class two clips of a debate, formerly aired on Canadian public broadcaster TVOntario, with psychologist Jordan Peterson on Bill C-16, which added "gender identity or expression" as a prohibited ground for discrimination to the Canadian Human Rights Act and as an identifiable group to the Criminal Code. After one student approached a campus LGBTQ support group to express concern about the clips, they contacted the University's acting manager of gender violence prevention, and Shepherd's supervisor requested that she attend a meeting the following day with him, a support group staffer, and the head of Shepherd's academic program. Without detailing the nature of the complaint or complaints, Shepherd was accused of having created a "toxic climate for some of the students" by playing the clips and adopting a neutral stance between the positions.

An independent fact-finder hired by the university reported that the meeting should not have taken place, that "no formal complaint, nor informal concern relative to a Laurier policy" had been registered, and that Shepherd had done nothing wrong by showing the clips. In June 2018 Shepherd filed a lawsuit against the university, the two professors, the third staff member and a student, alleging "harassment, intentional infliction of nervous shock, negligence, and constructive dismissal". Peterson also filed a lawsuit, for defamation, against the university and the staff members in the meeting. Both lawsuits were dismissed in 2024.

Shepherd is a board member of the Conservative Party of British Columbia. She was a communications officer with the party until October 1, 2025, when she was fired due to comments she had made on X (Twitter) against the provincial government's display of symbols related to the National Day for Truth and Reconciliation.

== Early life and education ==
Shepherd was raised in a non-religious household. Her mother teaches elementary school and her father is a youth counsellor. She attended Cariboo Hill Secondary School, Burnaby, before completing her undergraduate degree in communication at Simon Fraser University in Vancouver. In 2018 she received a Master of Arts degree in cultural analysis and social theory from Wilfrid Laurier University (WLU), after joining the graduate program in September 2017.

== Wilfrid Laurier University incident ==
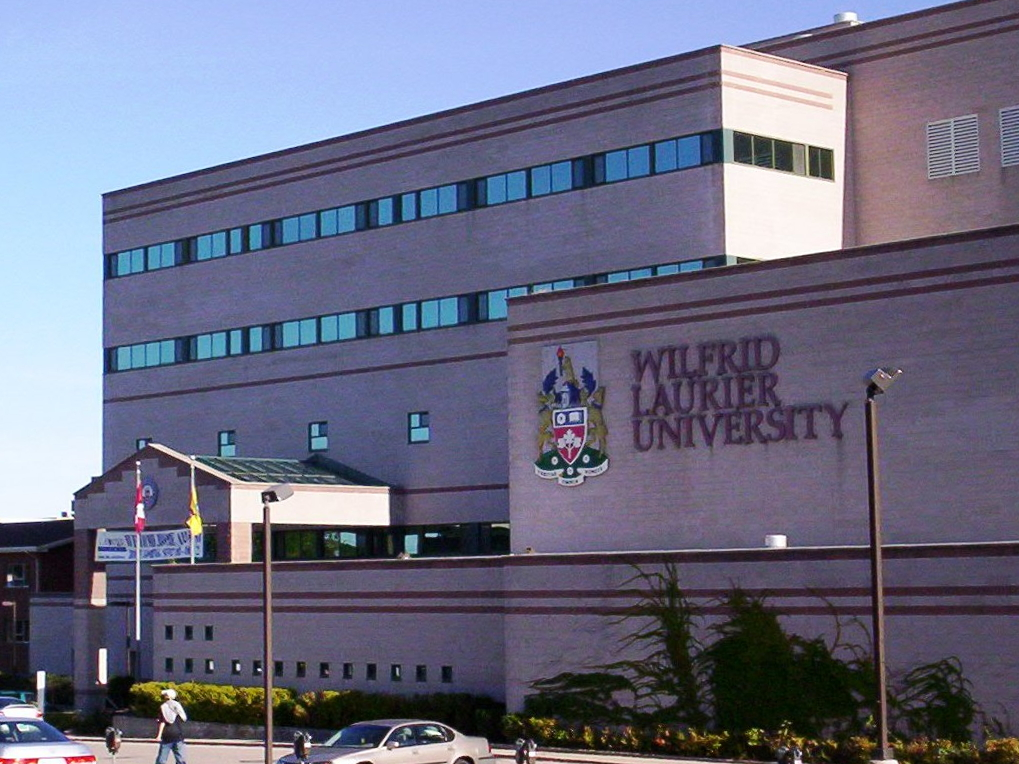
Main campus of Wilfrid Laurier University in Waterloo

=== Class ===
On 1 November 2017, Shepherd was teaching a WLU first-year undergraduate class, "Canadian Communication in Context". Discussing grammar and pronouns, she showed the class one two-minute clip and a second three-minute clip from The Agenda with Steve Paikin, a current-affairs program produced by TVOntario, a publicly funded channel.

The first clip featured the host, Steve Paikin, discussing gender-neutral pronouns with Jordan Peterson, a psychology professor at the University of Toronto. A critic of Bill C-16 and "what he sees as an intolerant left-wing in higher education", according to The Globe and Mail, Peterson was arguing against being legally compelled to use pronouns such as zie and zher or the singular they. He told Paikin that he was being asked "to use a certain set of words that I think are the constructions of people who have a political ideology that I don't believe in and that I also regard as dangerous", and described it as an "attempt to control language in a direction that isn't happening organically ... but by force and by fiat". In the second clip from the same debate, Peterson discussed the issues with Nicholas Matte, a historian who teaches in the Sexual Diversity Studies program at Toronto. Matte told Peterson: "I don't care about your language use. I care about the safety of people being harmed."

After the clips were shown, a heated discussion took place among students in the class, some supportive of Peterson and others critical; one told a college newspaper that students had used the discussion "as an excuse to make fun of trans identities".

=== Meeting ===
According to Toby Finlay, an administrator with the university's Rainbow Centre, an LGBTQ support group, one student approached them with an expression of concern about the clips. The Rainbow Centre then spoke to Adria Joel, acting manager of gender violence prevention in the university's Diversity and Equity Office. On 7 November 2017 Nathan Rambukkana, Shepherd's supervisor, emailed Shepherd to ask that she attend a meeting the following day with him, Joel, and Hillary Pimlott, head of Shepherd's academic program. Shepherd's mother suggested that she record the discussion; the other participants did not know they were being recorded. Citing confidentiality, they did not show Shepherd the complaint, say who had complained, or explain how many complaints there had been; she was told only that "one or multiple students had come forward" expressing concern.

During the 40-minute meeting, Shepherd was accused of having created a "toxic climate for some of the students" by playing the clips and adopting a neutral stance between the positions. Shepherd argued that students must be exposed to mainstream ideas, and that the ideas should be presented without taking sides. The professor compared the pronoun debate to discussing whether a student of color should have rights; that is, it is "not something intellectually neutral that is up for debate". Shepherd responded that the matter at hand was indeed "out there" and up for debate. Arguing that the ideas had been presented as a valid perspective, the professor compared the Peterson clip to "neutrally playing a speech by Hitler or Milo Yiannopoulos from Gamergate." Presenting such material devoid of criticism was "diametrically opposed to everything that we've been talking about in the lectures", he said.

The professor added that Peterson's arguments were "counter to the Canadian Human Rights Code [sic]", (Note: It is not clear whether the professor was referring to the Canadian Human Rights Act (federal law) or the Ontario Human Rights Code (provincial law).) and that what had happened in class had been contrary to the university's Gendered and Sexual Violence Policy; the manager offered the view that it might have violated the Ontario Human Rights Code. (Note: Professor (WLU meeting, 8 November 2017, from c. 00:03:50): "These arguments are counter to the Canadian Human Rights Code ever since—and I know that we talked about C-16—ever since this passed, it is discriminatory to be targeting someone due to their gender identity or gender expression." Professor (from c. 00:22:06): "What happened was contrary to ... the [university's] Gender and Sexual Violence Policy." ... Shepherd: "Sorry, what did I violate in that policy?" Manager: "So, gender-based violence, transphobia, in that policy. Causing harm to trans students by bringing their identity as invalid or their pronouns as invalid [several speaking at once] ... which under the Ontario Human Rights Code are a protected thing and also something that Laurier holds as a value." See "12.4 Gendered and Sexual Violence Policy and Procedures", Wilfrid Laurier University, archived 22 November 2017. The Ontario Human Rights Code added gender identity and expression as a protected ground in 2012. According to the Ontario Human Rights Commission, "Refusing to refer to a trans person by their chosen name and a personal pronoun that matches their gender identity, or purposely misgendering, will likely be discrimination when it takes place in a social area covered by the Code, including employment, housing and services like education.")

The meeting ended with Rambukkana asking that Shepherd send him her lesson plan prior to each class because there had been a breakdown in communication. This was the extent of her punishment, but Rambukkana said that he wasn't sure what else might happen going forward and that he had to discuss the matter with other members of the faculty.

=== Recording released, apologies ===
Shepherd released the recording to the National Post, as well as to a local newspaper and another on Canada's west coast. The National Post contacted her immediately, and Christie Blatchford wrote an opinion piece in the Post on 10 November. WLU's president, Deborah MacLatchy, and Professor Nathan Rambukkana published letters of apology on 21 November. MacLatchy said of the meeting that it "does not reflect the values and practices to which Laurier aspires". In his apology, Rambukkana said he should have done more to support Shepherd as her course director and supervisor, and that he had reconsidered some of his positions since the meeting. He wrote that he regretted comparing Peterson to Hitler, which was "untrue and was never my intention". (Note: Nathan Rambukkana (apology to Lindsay Shepherd, 21 November 2017): But instead I tried to make a point about the need to contextualize difficult material, and drew on the example of playing a speech by Hitler to do it. This was, obviously, a poorly chosen example. I meant to use it to drive home a point about context by saying here was material that would definitely need to be contextualized rather than presented neutrally, and instead I implied that Dr. Peterson is like Hitler, which is untrue and was never my intention. While I disagree strongly with many of Dr. Peterson's academic positions and actions, the tired analogy does him a disservice and was the opposite of useful in our discussion.)

=== University inquiry ===
The university asked a lawyer, Robert Centa, to conduct an independent investigation. His report, which the university did not release, found that Shepherd had not violated university policies and that the meeting had involved "significant overreach". On 18 December 2017 the university president, Deborah MacLatchy, issued a statement saying that there had been "numerous errors in judgement made in the handling of the meeting". The meeting should not have taken place, she wrote, because "[n]o formal complaint, nor informal concern relative to a Laurier policy, was registered about the screening of the video." She concluded that there had been "no wrongdoing on the part of Ms. Shepherd in showing the clip from TVO in her tutorial".

According to MacLatchy, the information about the class had been received via a staff member in the Rainbow Centre "from students who had been on campus talking about it. The policy was not designed to deal with those kind of comments and concerns not actually being raised through the process." In April 2018 she repeated that whatever issue had been raised about the clips, it "was not a complaint as the term is defined in the university’s Gendered and Sexual Violence Policy, which Mr. Centa reviewed in establishing his findings".

=== Lawsuits ===
In June 2018, Shepherd filed a lawsuit against the university, Rambukkana, Pimlott, Joel, and a graduate student for damages of $3.6 million, claiming "harassment, intentional infliction of nervous shock, negligence, and constructive dismissal". On 18 June that year, Peterson filed a $1.5-million defamation lawsuit against Laurier, Rambukkana, Pimlott, and Joel. His statement of claim alleges that he was compared to Hitler and portrayed as "sexist, misogynist, dangerous and racist" during the November 2017 meeting. In December 2018, Rambukkana and Pimlott filed a third-party claim against Shepherd, alleging she had had control over the recording and should therefore be liable for any damages Peterson suffered as a result of its publication.

Shepherd's lawsuit was dismissed on November 8, 2024. Peterson's lawsuit was dismissed the day before.

=== Free speech policy ===
In August 2018, Ontario mandated all colleges and universities to develop and comply with a free speech policy. The mandate requires a definition of freedom of speech, a policy based on the Chicago principles, and annual reports to the Higher Education Quality Council of Ontario. WLU publishes the reports online.

== Subsequent career ==
After the incident, Shepherd gave multiple interviews, including to newspapers and CBC News, as well as on YouTube shows such the Dave Rubin Report and Louder with Crowder, discussing the implications for free speech and academic freedom. She remained active online, gathering over 30,000 Twitter followers by December 2017.

A May 2018 Boston Herald editorial identified Shepherd as one of a group of intellectuals described as the intellectual dark web. Later that month, Shepherd received the Harry Weldon Canadian Values Award from the public policy group POGG Canada for her free-speech advocacy. On 7 February 2019, the Justice Centre for Constitutional Freedoms announced that Shepherd was joining the Justice Centre as a "Campus Free Speech Fellow".

On 14 July 2019 Shepherd was banned from Twitter due to an exchange with Jessica Yaniv on the social media platform. In their exchange Yaniv said "I heard @realDonaldTrump is building a wall inside of your uterus aka your ‘reproductive abnormality’ hopefully the wall works as intended", to which Shepherd responded "At least I have a uterus, you fat ugly man". Shepherd said she would look to using other platforms, possibly including Thinkspot, a platform proposed by Jordan Peterson. Shepherd's Twitter was reinstated later that month.

Shepherd appears in the political documentary No Safe Spaces, released on October 25, 2019.

She writes regularly for the True North Centre for Public Policy, a conservative media outlet.

Shepherd is also the Director of Communications and Engagement at the Frontier Centre for Public Policy.

In 2022, Shepherd was elected a director of the Conservative Party of British Columbia as part of Aaron Gunn's Common Sense BC Coalition and has remained on the board since then. Shepherd was criticized for a post she made on September 25, 2025, a few days before the National Day for Truth and Reconciliation, in which she described the flying of the Truth and Reconciliation flag at the BC Parliament Buildings as a "disgrace". She further stated that "the Orange Shirt and the Orange Flag perpetuate untruths about Canadian history". On October 1, 2025, BC Conservative leader John Rustad terminated her employment as a communications officer with the party.

== Personal life ==
Shepherd is married to a Romanian immigrant and has three children. She is a vegetarian.

== Bibliography ==
- Shepherd, Lindsay (2021). Diversity and Exclusion: Confronting the Campus Free Speech Crisis. Minds Eye Publications. p. 249. ISBN 978-0993919572.
