= Deborah MacLatchy =

Canadian ecotoxicologist and comparative endocrinologist

- Born: 1964 (age 61–62); Wolfville, Nova Scotia, Canada
- Partner: Bill Campbell

Academic background
- Education: BSc, Acadia University; PhD, zoology, University of Manitoba
- Thesis: Properties of 5-̓monodeiodinase and factors that affect its activity in rainbow trout (Oncorhynchus mykiss). (1991)

Academic work
- Institutions: Wilfrid Laurier University; University of New Brunswick

Deborah Lynn MacLatchy (born 1964) is a Canadian ecotoxicologist and comparative endocrinologist. She is the seventh President and Vice-Chancellor of Wilfrid Laurier University, having formally led the International Office at the University of New Brunswick. She also served as President and Council Member of the Canadian Society of Zoologists and Chair of the Science Directors of the Canadian Rivers Institute. In 2012, MacLatchy was recognized as one of Canada’s Most Powerful Women in a Top 100 list compiled by the Women’s Executive Network.

== Early life and education ==
MacLatchy was born in 1964, in Wolfville, Nova Scotia, Canada, to parents Cyrus and Ann. Her father was a physics professor at Acadia University and her mother was a special education teacher. Cyrus was originally from Preston, Ontario, where he met Ann before moving to New Brunswick to go to law school. While MacLatchy attended Acadia for her Bachelor of Science (BSc) honours degree, she worked as a lifeguard and taught swimming at the university pool. Upon receiving her BSc degree, MacLatchy enrolled at the University of Manitoba for her doctoral degree in zoology. She focused on the minutiae of physical mechanisms, specifically, how thyroid hormones work in fish. MacLatchy later listed her undergraduate and doctoral professors as personal heroes or mentors during her scientific career, including Dan Toews, Geoff Eales, and Glen Van Der Kraak.

== Career ==
=== University of New Brunswick ===
Upon completing her doctoral degree, she enrolled at the University of Guelph for postdoctoral work and later joined the faculty at the University of New Brunswick (UNB). During her early years at UNB, she helped establish the Canadian Rivers Institute (CRI) and was the recipient of a Natural Sciences and Engineering Research Council Synergy award for partnerships for her "collaborative work on the issue of endocrine disruption in aquatic environments caused by industrial contaminants." In 2003, she served as President and Council Member of the Canadian Society of Zoologists for one term.

=== Wilfrid Laurier University ===
MacLatchy eventually left UNB to become dean of the Faculty of Science at Wilfrid Laurier University (WLU) for a five-year term starting in 2007. She continued her ecology work started with the CRI at WLU and worked with fellow professors to identify endocrine disrupting substances contaminating watersheds and investigate the impact of environmental EDSs on hormonal systems in fish. The results were then used in the water and wastewater industry to lower the impact of pulp and paper mills and sewage treatment facilities on the environment. Following her first year in this role, she was appointed to the position of vice-president of academic and provost. In these positions, MacLatchy oversaw the development of a new strategic academic plan, the creation of a multi-campus governance framework, the launch of the Laurier Institute for Water Science, the start of the Laurier Centre for Women in Science, the creation and expansion of the Office of Indigenous Initiatives, and the development of a new institutional budget model. In 2012, MacLatchy was recognized as one of Canada’s Most Powerful Women in a Top 100 list compiled by the Women’s Executive Network.

As a result of her research, MacLatchy served as Chair of the Science Directors of the CRI and was the recipient of the 2015 Senior Women Academic Administrators of Canada Recognition Award. On July 1, 2017, MacLatchy succeeded Max Blouw as the seventh President and Vice-Chancellor of Wilfrid Laurier University. After a nine-month search process, her appointment was recommended unanimously by the university Senate and approved unanimously by the Board of Governors. During her first year as president, MacLatchy and Professor Nathan Rambukkana published letters of apology on November 21, 2017, in regards to how the university handled a complaint about a Lindsay Shepherd's choice of class material. In 2019, MacLatchy was appointed to serve as Co-Chair of the Ontario Council on Articulation and Transfer (ONCAT).
