= National NewsMedia Council =

Canadian press council

The National NewsMedia Council is a national press council that reviews and adjudicates complaints from the public about the news media organizations in Canada. The council was created as an amalgamation of several regional press councils, including the Ontario Press Council.

== History ==
The National NewsMedia Council was created in 2015. It replaced regional press councils, including the Ontario Press Council, the Atlantic Press Council and the British Columbia Press Council. The council was created after declining financial support for regional press councils. The Quebec Press Council and the Alberta Press Council declined to join. The Alberta Press Council ceased to exist on Dec. 31, 2018 and its members were invited to join the National NewsMedia Council. The National NewsMedia Council was supported at its creation by major newspapers and chains including the Toronto Star, the Globe and Mail, Postmedia and Sun Media. Since its founding, the organization has diversified its membership to include periodicals, including the Walrus, Maclean's, and Toronto Life, as well as many of the large digital news websites in Canada, including Canadaland, The Discourse, The Athletic. In 2018, the council began an academic initiative to partner with post-secondary institutions.

The first president and chief executive officer was John Fraser. In 2018, Fraser transitioned from chief executive officer to the role of executive chair, after the organization's first chair, Frances Lankin, was appointed to the Senate of Canada. Day-to-day operations of the National NewsMedia Council are managed by executive director Pat Perkel.
