= Eileen Mercier =

Canadian businesswoman

- Born: July 7, 1947 (age 79); Toronto, Ontario, Canada
- Partner(s): Ernest C. Mercier (m. 1980; died 2002) Chuck Hantho (m. 2008)

Academic background
- Education: BA, English, 1968, Waterloo Lutheran University; MBA, 1977, York University; MA, English, University of Alberta

Eileen Ann Mercier (née Falconer; born July 7, 1947) is a Canadian businesswoman. In 2016, she was appointed the Chancellor of Wilfrid Laurier University, having formerly served as chair of the board of directors of Payments Canada and Ontario Teachers' Pension Plan. In 2018, she was named one of Canada's 100 most powerful women and was inducted into the Women's Executive Network Hall of Fame.

== Early life ==
Mercier was born on July 7, 1947, in Toronto, Ontario, to parents Thomas S. Paddy and Frances K. Falconer. Although she was born in Toronto, she was raised in Owen Sound and Sarnia. Mercier attended Central Collegiate Institute for her high school career, graduating with the Central Key Club award for proficiency in foreign languages and the Sir John Colborne chapter (IODE) award for highest in botany and zoology. She also received the Department of Education scholarship and the Waterloo Lutheran University (now Martin Luther University College) scholarship.

Mercier subsequently attended Waterloo Lutheran University for her Bachelor of Arts degree in English, graduating in 1968. During her time at the institution, she won the Student Activity Award and participated in the Students' University Choir. She then enrolled at the University of Alberta for her Master's degree, leading to a job writing for the Toronto Stock Exchange and eventually joining the Toronto-Dominion Bank (TD Bank).

== Career ==
At TD Bank, Mercier earned her Master of Business Administration from York University's Schulich School of Business in 1977. Upon leaving the following year, she built a career as a finance executive with CanWest, Gulf Canada, and Abitibi-Price Inc. In 1988, Mercier was appointed vice-president and treasurer of Abitibi-Price Inc., responsible for corporate capital, pension fund and risk management. She continued to serve on Wilfrid Laurier University's Board of Governors in the 1980s and was board chair from 1988 through 1990. From 1995 to 2003, Mercier ran her management consulting firm, Finvoy Management Inc., specializing in financial strategy, restructuring and corporate governance issues.

As a result of her experience, Mercier served as chair of the Ontario Teachers' Pension Plan (OTPP) Investment Committee, a member of their Audit and Actuarial Committee, and a member of their Governance Committee. In 2007, she was appointed chairwoman of the OTPP Board and was later re-appointed in 2009 by Kathleen Wynne and Joe Lamoureux. Besides OTPP, Mercier also served as a board member of CGI Group, Intact Financial, ING Bank of Canada and Teekay. As a member of the board of trustees at University Health Network, Mercier and the ING Foundation jointly donated over $356,000 toward a tissue-engineering project focused on repairing heart damage in children. Her alumni, York University, and Wilfrid Laurier subsequently awarded her an honorary Doctor of Laws. In 2012, the Financial Post named her one of Canada's 100 Most Powerful Women. Mercier retired from the Teekay board in 2018.

In May 2016, Mercier was named to the nominating committee recommending candidates to serve on the Ontario Retirement Pension Plan Administration Corporation's board of directors. Following this, she received unanimous support to be appointed the new chancellor of Wilfrid Laurier University by the Board of Governors. During her first term as chancellor, she was named one of Canada's 100 most powerful women and was inducted into the Women's Executive Network Hall of Fame. In June 2020, Mercier was re-appointed chancellor of Wilfrid Laurier University for a four-year term.

== Personal life ==
Mercier married TD Bank executive vice-president Ernest Mercier in 1980, who died in 2002. She remarried in 2008 to Chuck Hantho, retired CEO of Canadian Industries Ltd. and Dominion Textiles. Together, they have nine children and stepchildren.
