= Klaus Woerner =

Klaus Woerner (1939–2005) was the founder and CEO of ATS Automation Tooling Systems. Its main headquarters is located in Cambridge, Ontario, Canada and it is one of the world's foremost companies dealing with automated manufacturing equipment.

Woerner was born in Germany in 1939. He completed his apprenticeship as a precision mechanic in Switzerland before moving to Montreal, Quebec, Canada in 1960. Klaus worked for several companies in Montreal while taking night school classes to complete his high school diploma. He studied engineering at Concordia University in Montreal for three years, and completed his degree in Industrial Engineering at Ryerson University after he and his wife moved to Toronto, Ontario. He graduated in 1972 and began working for Ford, which introduced him to automated manufacturing technology.

Woerner was keen to start his own business and in 1978 he started the engineering company which grew into Automation Tooling Systems. The company now has 26 worldwide divisions and over 4000 employees.

Woerner won many distinguished business awards, including the Ernst & Young Canadian Entrepreneur of the Year in 1997. He was a great philanthropist, and donated 5 million dollars to the main theatre of Kitchener, Ontario, the Centre in the Square, as well as 2 million dollars to the engineering complex of the local community college, Conestoga College.

ATS is a world leader in the design of automated manufacturing equipment, and its systems are used by companies that produce auto parts, pharmaceuticals and computer/electronics equipment.

Woerner died of cancer in February 2005 at the age of 65. Lawrence Tapp, chairman of ATS Board of Directors said in a statement: "Klaus was a gifted engineer, entrepreneur and business leader who made a significant and lasting contribution to the global automation industry, to the Region of Waterloo where he chose to found ATS more than 25 years ago and to thousands of young engineers and tradespeople around the world who benefited from his commitment to apprenticeship training. His sharp intellect, dedication to adding value through innovation, global insight, and passion to succeed made him one of Canada's great entrepreneurs".
