= Canadian Rivers Institute =

Canadian Rivers Institute, Saint John, Canada

The Canadian Rivers Institute (CRI) was founded in 2000 as a centre of excellence in river sciences and is based at the University of New Brunswick (UNB) on both the Fredericton and Saint John campuses. The mandate of the CRI is to conduct both multi-disciplinary basic and applied research focusing on rivers from their headwaters to their estuaries, to promote the conservation, protection and sustainable use of water, and to educate professionals, graduate students and the public on water sciences. Members of the CRI conduct research on regional, national and international issues related to rivers and their land-water linkages.

Initially founded by four Fellows (two professors and two Canada Research Chairs), the CRI has grown into a network of researchers from universities, federal and provincial governments, industry and non-governmental organizations with an interest in river and estuarine sciences. The CRI has expanded rapidly and now includes 14 Fellows (including four Canada Research Chairs), 30 Associates, 12 staff, and over 45 graduate students, and has a new state-of-the-art building on the Saint John campus (opened September 2007) and numerous partnerships and programs with researchers and organizations across Canada and around the world .

== Fredericton Campus ==
Research by the CRI at the UNB Fredericton campus is primarily focused on aquatic ecology through the New Brunswick Cooperative Fish and Wildlife Research Unit, the Stable Isotopes in Nature Laboratory and the Laboratory on Mitigating Impacts of Hydroelectric Development. In addition to this, the National Water Research Institute of Environment Canada houses four members of its staff in a Laboratory for Multistressor Effects on Aquatic Biodiversity.

== Saint John Campus ==
Located on the UNB campus in Saint John, New Brunswick, Canada, research at the CRI Saint John focuses on the environmental impacts of industrial and agricultural operations, chemical contamination of food webs and the reproductive physiology of fish as well as ecotoxicology.
