= Neale Tayler =

American university president

Neale Hamilton Tayler (June 16, 1917 – 1986) was the third president of Wilfrid Laurier University. He held the position from 1978 to 1982.
