= Lorna Marsden =

Canadian sociologist, and former politician

The Honourable Lorna Marsden CM OOnt
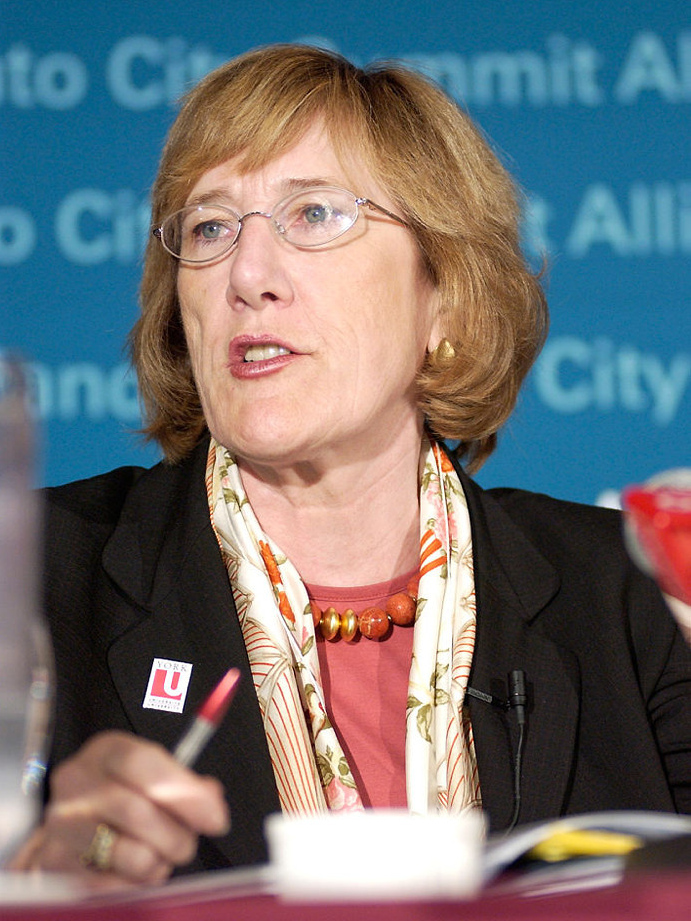
- Marsden in 2003

Canadian Senator from Ontario
- In office 1984–1992
- Appointed by: Pierre Trudeau

President of Wilfrid Laurier University
- In office 1992–1997
- Preceded by: John Angus Weir
- Succeeded by: Robert Rosehart

President of York University
- In office 1997–2007
- Preceded by: Susan Mann
- Succeeded by: Mamdouh Shoukri

Personal details
- Born: March 6, 1942 (age 84) Sidney, British Columbia, Canada
- Party: Liberal
- Spouse: Edward B Harvey Married 1962, Died 2025.
- Education: University of Toronto (BA); Princeton University (PhD)

Lorna Marsden, CM OOnt (born March 6, 1942) is a Canadian sociologist, academic administrator, and former member of the Senate of Canada. She is the former President and Vice-Chancellor of both Wilfrid Laurier University and York University.

== Career ==
Born in Sidney, British Columbia, she received a Bachelor of Arts degree from the University of Toronto in 1968 and a Ph.D in sociology from Princeton University in 1972. Her doctoral dissertation was titled "Doctors who teach: an influence on health delivery in Ontario." In 1972, she joined the University of Toronto where she was a professor of sociology. She was the Associate Dean of the Graduate School and the Vice-Provost (Arts and Sciences) at the University of Toronto.

She attended the founding meeting of the National Action Committee on the Status of Women in April, 1972 and served as President of NAC from 1975 to 1977.She was active in the Ontario Committee on the Status of Women from 1971 and is co-author of the book about that feminist group, White Gloves Off (2018).

She joined the Liberal Party of Canada, becoming national policy chair in 1975 and vice-president in 1980. In 1984, she was appointed by Prime Minister Pierre Trudeau to the Senate representing the senatorial division of Toronto-Taddle Creek, Ontario. She chaired the Senate's Standing Committee on Social Affairs, Science and Technology from 1989 to 1991 as well as being a member of committees ranging from National Finance to a special committee on Youth. She resigned in 1992 to become president and Vice-Chancellor of Wilfrid Laurier University. In 1997, she was appointed president and Vice-Chancellor of York University, serving until 2007.

Marsden was named one of "Canada's Most Powerful Women: Top 100", She became a Member of the Order of Canada in 2006 and a member of the Order of Ontario in 2009. She received the Order of Merit (First Class) of the Federal Republic of Germany in 2007. She holds honorary doctorates from the University of New Brunswick, University of Winnipeg, Queen's University, the University of Toronto, Wilfrid Laurier University and the University of Victoria. She has received the Queen Elizabeth II Silver Jubilee Medal, the Canada 125th Anniversary Medal, and the Queen Elizabeth II Golden Jubilee Medal. She was named a YWCA Women of Distinction in 2003 and was made an Honorary Alumnae of the University of Victoria in 2003. She received the Senate Medal for Canada 150 in 2017.

As President of York University, Marsden founded the university's Culture and Communications program (joint with Ryerson University) and she led a major building campaign. One outcome of the building campaign was the construction of the university's first green building: for computer engineering.

== Bibliography ==
=== Books and reports ===
  White Gloves Off, The Work of the Ontario Committee on the Status of Women, Second Story Press, Feminist History Society, 2018 (with Beth Atcheson)

- Leading the Modern University, York University's Presidents on Continuity and Change, 1974-2014,(2016) University of Toronto Press,(with chapters by I Macdonald, H Arthurs, S Mann and M Shoukri)
- Canadian Women & the Struggle for Equality. (2012) Oxford University Press, Toronto.
- The Fragile Federation, Social Change in Canada,(1979) McGraw-Hll Ryerson, Toronto (with Edward Harvey)
- Canada's women university presidents: social change in Canada. (2004) Canadian High Commission, Canada House, London.
- Doctors who teach: an influence on health delivery in Ontario. (1972) Princeton University. Thesis.
- Family formation in a new land: Dutch, Portuguese, and West Indian women in Toronto. (1975) Research Branch, Ontario Ministry of Community and Social Service, Toronto.
- Population probe. (1972) Copp Clark, Toronto.
- The recession, women's work, and social welfare in Canada. (1992) University of British Columbia Centre for Research in Women's Studies and Gender Relations.
- Report of the North York family formation study. (1975) Toronto.
- Social and economic debates on the impact of microelectronics in Canada: a report to the Task Force on Micro-Electronics and Employment. (1982)
- Sorokin's dilemma: sociology and public policy development. (1989) University of Saskatchewan, Saskatoon.
- Technological change in Ontario: the questions of innovation and control in the small office. (1987) Studies in Communication and Information Technology, Queens University, Kingston.
- Timing and presence: getting women's issues on the trade agenda. (1992) Gender, Science and Development Programme, International Federation of Institutes for Advanced Study, Toronto.

== Archives ==
There are Lorna Marsden fonds at Library and Archives Canada and the University of Toronto.
