= Paul Heinbecker =

Canadian diplomat

Paul Earl Heinbecker CM (born 1941) is a Canadian retired career diplomat and a former Canadian ambassador to Germany and permanent representative of Canada to the United Nations in New York City. He currently lives in Ottawa, Ontario.

Heinbecker is married to Ayşe Köymen. They have two daughters, Yasemin and Céline.

== Education and diplomatic career ==
Heinbecker earned an honours B.A. from Waterloo Lutheran University (now Wilfrid Laurier University) in 1965. He has honorary doctorates from Laurier and St. Thomas Universities.

Heinbecker joined the Department of External Affairs immediately after graduation; his postings abroad were in Ankara, Stockholm, Paris and Washington.

From 1989 to 1992, Heinbecker served as Chief Foreign Policy Advisor and speechwriter for Prime Minister Brian Mulroney, and as Assistant Secretary to the Cabinet for Foreign and Defence Policy.

In 1992, he was appointed ambassador to Germany. In the Department of Foreign Affairs in the late 1990s, he was the senior official responsible for the development of the Canadian human security agenda. He led the Canadian task forces on the Zaire and the Kosovo conflicts, participating in the diplomacy that ended the Kosovo war. He also served as chief negotiator of the Kyoto Protocol to the International Climate Change Convention.

In 2000, Heinbecker was appointed Canadian representative to the United Nations. There he was a strong proponent of the International Criminal Court and argued for compromise to avoid the Iraq War of 2003.

== Recent work ==
Heinbecker was a Distinguished Fellow at the Centre for International Governance Innovation and the inaugural director of the Centre for Global Relations at Wilfrid Laurier University.

Heinbecker gained media attention in 2003 when he promoted a Canadian compromise at the United Nations which, if successful, would have obviated the Iraq war. A frequent commenter on Canadian foreign policy, he is the author or editor of numerous articles and books. Heinbecker’s most recent book is entitled, “Getting Back in the Game”. It has three components: Heinbecker’s history working as a Canadian Diplomat, an account of Canadian foreign policy, and the optimistic vision for Canadian foreign policy in the future. It promotes a future in which the government of Canada can take a stand and advocate for issues like climate change and the Middle East. He stresses in this novel the key role Canada plays in the rehabilitation of global governance. Heinbecker also edited a book alongside Patricia Goff entitled, "Irrelevant or Indispensable? The United Nations in the 21st Century".

In 2005, he criticized fellow diplomat Franco Pillarella for the latter's claim that he was unaware that Maher Arar was being tortured in Syria or that torture was even practised there.

On October 12, 2010, Foreign Affairs Minister Lawrence Cannon said "Not being able to speak with one voice as a country had a negative impact on Canada's bid" for a seat in the United Nations Security Council, with reference to Liberal leader Michael Ignatieff's comments, which included "I know how important it is for Canada to get a seat on the Security Council, but Canadians have to ask a tough question: 'Has this government earned that place?' We're not convinced it has." On October 13, Heinbecker said that the failure to win a seat was the result of the government's policies, not of Ignatieff's criticism.

Diplomatic posts
Preceded by Robert Fowler	Canadian Ambassador to the United Nations; August 2000–January 2004	Succeeded by Allan Rock
