= Max Blouw =

Canadian zoologist

Max Blouw CM (born 1951) was the president and vice-chancellor of Wilfrid Laurier University. He was inducted into this position on September 1, 2007. After serving two 5 year terms, Blouw stepped down and was replaced by Deborah MacLatchy.

== Early life ==
Blouw was born in the Netherlands in 1951. He later moved to Canada as a child in 1957 and became a Canadian citizen in 1963. In 1972, he obtained a Bachelor of Science degree from the University of Manitoba. Five years later, he received his Master of Science degree in zoology, once again from the University of Manitoba, in 1977. Blouw later earned his PhD in biology from the University of New Brunswick in 1982.

== Career ==
Blouw began his career as a biologist in the Department of Fisheries and Oceans in Winnipeg, Manitoba. He later went on to teach biology at St. Francis Xavier University and zoology at the University of British Columbia. Blouw arrived at the University of Northern British Columbia in 1995 as a professor of biology. In 1997, he joined the university's administration in the position of the associate vice-president and dean of graduate studies. Three years later in 2000, Blouw was named vice-president of research. He is a member of the Natural Sciences and Engineering Research Council, and acts as an "executive council member and as chair of its prestigious award selection committees and committee on grants and scholarships". The Council recently reappointed Blouw to a second term as the chair of the university advisory group to Industry Canada. He is the recipient of the 2005 Science and Technology Champion Award from the BC Innovation Council "in recognition of his leadership".

On December 19, 2006, Wilfrid Laurier University announced that Blouw was chosen as the university's next president, its seventh. He was chosen unanimously by the university's selection committee to fill this position.

In 2020, he was appointed as a member of the Order of Canada.

== Personal life ==
Blouw is married to Lynn, with whom he has two sons: Peter and Carl and they live in Victoria, British Columbia.
