= William Villaume =

William John Villaume (June 17, 1914 – March 27, 1995) was an American Lutheran minister and the first president of Waterloo Lutheran University. He held the position from 1960 to 1966.
