= Michael D. Bordo =

Canadian–American economist (born 1942)

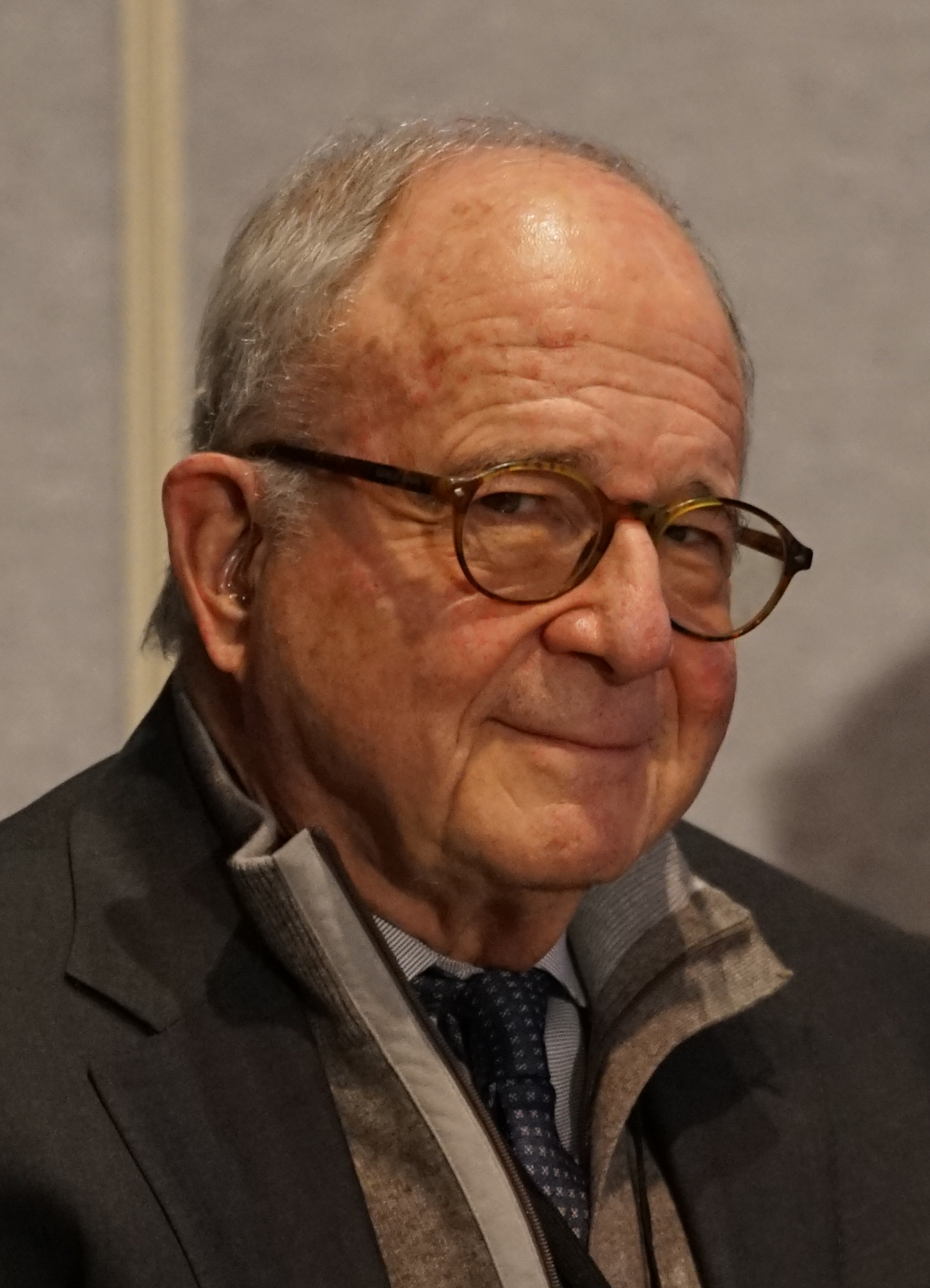
- Bordo at ASSA 2026
- Born: 1942 (age 83–84); Montreal, Quebec, Canada

Academic background
- Education: McGill University (BA, 1963); London School of Economics (MSc, 1965); University of Chicago (PhD, 1972)

Academic work
- Discipline: Monetary economics, economic history, central banking, international finance
- Institutions: Rutgers University; National Bureau of Economic Research; Hoover Institution; Princeton University

Michael David Bordo (born 1942) is a Canadian-American economist and economic historian whose research focuses on monetary history, international monetary economics, monetary policy, monetary economics, financial stability (especially financial crises), central banking, and international monetary arrangements. He is an emeritus Board of Governors Professor of Economics and an emeritus Distinguished Professor of Economics at Rutgers University, where he formerly directed the Center for Monetary and Financial History. He is a research associate at the National Bureau of Economic Research (NBER), a distinguished visitor at the Griswold Center for Economic Policy Studies at Princeton University, and the Duncan Stewart Distinguished Visiting Fellow at the Hoover Institution at Stanford University.

Bordo's research examines the historical performance of monetary institutions and policy regimes, particularly the classical gold standard and the interwar gold exchange standard, the Bretton Woods system, and the evolution of the Federal Reserve and other central banks. He has also focused on two eras of upheaval: the Great Depression and the Great Inflation. His scholarship has addressed the relationship between monetary credibility, price level and real economic stability, and financial stability, the historical causes and consequences of financial crises, and the development of international financial integration. He has collaborated extensively with economists including Anna J. Schwartz, Barry Eichengreen, Hugh Rockoff, Ehsan Choudhri, Ronald MacDonald, Robert McCauley, Eric Monnet, Marc Flandreau, Catherine Schenk, Lars Jonung, Joseph G. Haubrich, Eugene White, David Wheelock, John Landon-Lane, Angela Redish, Harold James, and others.

According to the September 2026 RePEc/IDEAS rankings, Bordo ranked fifth among 1,978 researchers classified in business, economic, and financial history. As of October 31, 2026, his research had received 7,601 citations in the RePEc CitEc database, with an h-index of 46. Research.com reports 29,593 citations to Bordo's publications and a discipline-specific h-index (D-index) of 86 in economics and finance. Google Scholar estimates 36,685 citations.

Bordo served as president of the Economic History Association from 2016 to 2017 and has been a member of the Shadow Open Market Committee since 2009. He has authored or edited numerous books on monetary economics, central banking, and economic history. His collected research is housed in the archives of the Hoover Institution at Stanford University.

== Education ==
Bordo was born in Montreal, Quebec, Canada, in 1942. He received his Bachelor of Arts degree in economics and political science from McGill University in 1963 and a Master of Science degree in economics from the London School of Economics in 1965. He later attended the University of Chicago, where he studied under Milton Friedman and Robert Fogel and earned his Ph.D. in economics in 1972.

== Career and contribution ==
Bordo began his academic career at Carleton University in Ottawa, Canada, where he served as an assistant professor and subsequently an associate professor of economics from 1969 to 1981. He joined the University of South Carolina as a professor of economics in 1981 and remained there until 1989, when he moved to Rutgers University.

At Rutgers, Bordo became a Distinguished Professor of Economics in 1993 and served as director of the Center for Monetary and Financial History beginning in 1990. He later held the Board of Governors Professorship of Economics. In 2025, he became an emeritus professor at Rutgers.

Throughout his career, Bordo has held visiting academic appointments at universities including Harvard University, Princeton University, the University of Cambridge, the London School of Economics, Carnegie Mellon University, the University of California, Los Angeles, and the Paris School of Economics. At Cambridge, he served as Pitt Professor of American History and Institutions during the 2006–2007 academic year and was a fellow of King's College, Cambridge. He has also held a number of visiting research fellowships at the Hoover Institution at Stanford University.

Bordo has held visiting and research appointments at central banks and international monetary institutions, including the International Monetary Fund, the Bank for International Settlements, the Bank of Canada, the Bank of England, the Bank of France, the Bank of Italy, the Sveriges Riksbank, the Czech National Bank, the Swiss National Bank, the Norges Bank, the Board of Governors of the Federal Reserve System, and several regional Federal Reserve Banks, including the Federal Reserve Banks of St. Louis, Cleveland, Richmond, and Dallas.

He has maintained a longstanding affiliation with the National Bureau of Economic Research, where he has served as a research associate in monetary economics and economic history. His academic research has appeared in many leading journals, including the American Economic Review,Journal of International Economics, Journal of Political Economy,Journal of Money, Credit and Banking, Journal of Monetary Economics, The Journal of Economic History, and Journal of International Money and Finance.

== Research and contributions ==
Bordo's research combines economic history with monetary theory and empirical macroeconomics. Much of his work uses historical evidence to evaluate the performance of monetary arrangements and the role of central banks in maintaining price stability, financial stability, and international monetary cooperation. His research extends from the classical gold standard of the nineteenth century to contemporary debates over monetary-policy rules, financial crises, asset price booms and busts, and digital currencies.

=== The quantity of money and the economy ===
Bordo's earliest research was conducted within the modern quantity theory of money framework developed by Milton Friedman, under whom he completed his doctoral dissertation at the University of Chicago. Friedman's 1956 restatement of the quantity theory emphasized the stability of the demand for money and the relationship between changes in the money supply and economic activity. In his dissertation research, published as "The Income Effects of the Sources of Monetary Change: An Historical Approach" in Economic Inquiry in 1975, Bordo investigated whether the economic effects of monetary change depended on how additional money entered the economy, such as through gold discoveries, changes in bank lending, or monetary operations by central banks. Using historical evidence from different monetary arrangements in the United States between 1834 and 1914, he tested whether the sources of monetary change significantly affected the relationship between money and income. He found that, in most of the cases examined, the source of monetary change had no significant independent effect on income, supporting the view that changes in the quantity of money were generally more important than the particular channels through which they originated.

Bordo extended this investigation to British monetary history in "The Income Effects of the Sources of New Money: A Comparison of the United States and the United Kingdom, 1870–1913," published in Explorations in Economic History in 1977. The article compared the relationship between sources of monetary expansion and economic activity in the United States and the United Kingdom during the classical gold standard era, extending the earlier American analysis into an international historical comparison. Together, the two studies examined a central question in the debate between monetarist and Keynesian approaches to monetary economics: whether changes in the money supply affected economic activity primarily through their aggregate magnitude or whether their particular sources also mattered.

Bordo's subsequent research examined the transmission of monetary disturbances to relative prices and economic activity. In "The Effects of Monetary Change on Relative Commodity Prices and the Role of Long-Term Contracts," published in the Journal of Political Economy in 1980, he investigated why prices in different industries respond at different speeds to changes in the money supply. The paper developed an explanation based on differences in price flexibility across industries, emphasizing the role of implicit long-term contracts in determining the speed of price adjustment. Using postwar U.S. data, Bordo found empirical support for the relationship between contract duration and the response of relative prices to monetary disturbances. The study contributed to research on the transmission of monetary shocks and the role of price rigidities in the economy.

Bordo also studied the long-run behavior of the velocity of money, or the rate at which money circulates through an economy (the inverse of money demand). In research with Lars Jonung, including their 1987 Cambridge University Press book The Long-Run Behavior of the Velocity of Circulation: The International Evidence, the authors examined historical patterns in money velocity across countries over more than a century. They identified a long-run U-shaped pattern in which velocity initially declined as economies became increasingly monetized, stabilized, and subsequently rose with the development of more sophisticated financial institutions and payment arrangements. Their analysis emphasized institutional changes, including financial innovation, the expansion of commercial banking, and the development of financial markets, as important determinants of money demand and velocity. The findings challenged explanations based primarily on income and interest rates and demonstrated the importance of financial institutions for understanding the long-run relationship between the money supply and economic activity.

Bordo has also contributed to the history of economic thought, examining the development of monetary theories and their relationship to economic history. In "John E. Cairnes on the Effects of the Australian Gold Discoveries, 1851–73: An Early Application of the Methodology of Positive Economics," published in History of Political Economy in 1975, Bordo examined how the nineteenth-century economist John Elliott Cairnes analyzed the monetary and economic consequences of Australian gold discoveries. The article considered Cairnes's use of economic theory and historical evidence as an early application of the methodology of positive economics.

Bordo's research on the history of monetary thought has also addressed Milton Friedman, Anna J. Schwartz, and Irving Fisher. In a 2013 article with Hugh Rockoff, "The Influence of Irving Fisher on Milton Friedman's Monetary Economics," he examined the intellectual relationship between Fisher's monetary theories and Friedman's subsequent contributions to monetary economics.

Bordo returned to the history of monetarist thought in "The Future of Monetarism after Milton Friedman," published in the Federal Reserve Bank of St. Louis Review in 2026. Written on the fiftieth anniversary of Friedman's receipt of the Nobel Memorial Prize in Economic Sciences, the article examined the development and continuing influence of monetarism on modern macroeconomics and monetary policy. Bordo argued that Friedman's contributions to the quantity theory of money, inflation expectations, and the case for monetary rules over discretion helped reshape central-bank policy during and after the Great Inflation of the 1970s. The article also examined how the declining stability of money demand led central banks to move away from monetary-aggregate targeting, while retaining elements of Friedman's approach to credibility, inflation control, and systematic monetary policy.

=== Monetary history and the gold standard ===
A central theme of Bordo's scholarship is the historical evolution of monetary institutions and the relationship between monetary regimes and economic performance. His research has compared the gold standard, the interwar monetary system, the Bretton Woods system, and the modern era of managed floating exchange rates.

In "The Classical Gold Standard: Some Lessons for Today," published in the Federal Reserve Bank of St. Louis Review in 1981, Bordo assessed the operation and economic performance of the international gold standard between approximately 1880 and 1914. Drawing on historical evidence from the United States and the United Kingdom, he compared the gold standard's record on long-run price stability, short-run price fluctuations, and economic performance with the experience of later monetary regimes. The article distinguished the gold standard's long-run tendency toward price stability from the substantial short-run fluctuations in prices and output that occurred under the system. It also examined the differences between the theoretical operation of the gold standard and the institutional practices through which it was maintained.

Bordo also examined the intellectual history of the gold standard in "The Gold Standard: The Traditional Approach," published in A Retrospective on the Classical Gold Standard, 1821–1931 (1984), a volume he co-edited with Anna J. Schwartz. The chapter surveyed major economic writers from the eighteenth through the twentieth centuries and identified recurring themes in traditional theories of the gold standard, including the role of gold as a monetary standard, the price-specie-flow mechanism, international adjustment, and the relationship between gold convertibility and price stability. Bordo traced how economists' interpretations of the gold standard developed across different schools of monetary thought, providing a historical foundation for his later research on the operation and credibility of monetary regimes.

In "Monetary Policy Regimes and Economic Performance: The Historical Record," published with Anna J. Schwartz in the Handbook of Macroeconomics in 1999, Bordo examined the evolution of monetary arrangements from the nineteenth century through the late twentieth century. The authors studied how different monetary institutions and policy frameworks shaped inflation, economic fluctuations, and the conduct of central banking. Their analysis examined the transition from monetary systems based on gold convertibility toward monetary regimes in which central banks increasingly pursued domestic economic stabilization.

In "The Gold Standard, Bretton Woods and Other Monetary Regimes: An Historical Appraisal" (1993), Bordo compared the economic performance of the classical gold standard, the Bretton Woods system, and floating exchange-rate regimes. He argued that the durability of international monetary arrangements depended not only on formal exchange-rate rules but also on credible commitments and incentives for participating countries to maintain those arrangements. The study emphasized the importance of institutional credibility in explaining why some monetary regimes proved more durable than others.

Bordo's research on the classical gold standard has examined the role of monetary commitments in establishing financial credibility and facilitating access to international capital markets. In "The Gold Standard as a Rule: An Essay in Exploration" (1995), co-authored with Finn E. Kydland, Bordo argued that the classical gold standard operated as a contingent monetary rule that constrained governments' ability to change future policy. Under this arrangement, countries could temporarily suspend gold convertibility during emergencies, such as wars, while maintaining credibility through a commitment to restore convertibility at the original parity afterward. In "The Gold Standard as a 'Good Housekeeping Seal of Approval'," published with Hugh Rockoff in The Journal of Economic History in 1996, the authors examined the borrowing experiences of countries during the classical gold standard era. They found that sustained adherence to the gold standard was associated with more favorable borrowing terms, suggesting that commitment to a credible monetary rule could facilitate access to foreign capital.

Bordo also examined the role of fiscal credibility and monetary commitments in shaping governments' responses to economic emergencies. In "A Tale of Two Currencies: British and French Finance During the Napoleonic Wars" (1991), co-authored with Eugene White and published in The Journal of Economic History, the authors compared British and French fiscal and monetary policies during the Napoleonic Wars. Although Britain suspended gold convertibility, borrowed extensively, and experienced inflation, it was able to finance much of the war through public borrowing because of its established reputation for fiscal responsibility and debt repayment. France, by contrast, maintained a metallic monetary standard but relied more heavily on taxation because earlier fiscal instability and the experience of revolutionary paper-money inflation had undermined its credibility with creditors. The authors argued that these differences in inherited fiscal credibility explained why Britain could pursue more flexible wartime financing policies than France, illustrating how a government's reputation for honoring its commitments influenced its monetary and fiscal choices.

Bordo also investigated the historical relationship between deflation, monetary regimes, and economic growth, distinguishing between "good" and "bad" deflation. In research with Angela Redish and John Landon-Lane, he argued that falling prices need not be associated with economic contraction when they result primarily from productivity improvements and increases in aggregate supply. Their analysis of the late nineteenth-century gold standard found that deflation was accompanied by positive output growth, reflecting substantial productivity gains, even though monetary disturbances also contributed to falling prices. By contrast, "bad" deflation occurs when declining aggregate demand and monetary contraction are associated with falling output, as during the Great Depression. In "Deflation and Monetary Policy in a Historical Perspective: Remembering the Past or Being Condemned to Repeat It?" (2005), co-authored with Andrew Filardo, Bordo extended this analysis across two centuries of international experience, distinguishing among "good, bad, and ugly" deflations and examining how monetary policy could respond to economically damaging deflation. This research emphasized that the consequences of falling prices depend on their underlying causes rather than deflation alone.

His 1999 book The Gold Standard and Related Regimes: Collected Essays brought together his research on monetary standards, monetary credibility, and the historical performance of gold-based international monetary systems.

=== Bretton Woods and international monetary systems ===
Another major area of Bordo's research concerns the development, operation, and collapse of international monetary systems, particularly the Bretton Woods system established after the Second World War.

With Barry Eichengreen, Bordo co-edited A Retrospective on the Bretton Woods System: Lessons for International Monetary Reform (1993), a collection examining the operation of the postwar international monetary order and the factors contributing to its eventual breakdown. In his introductory chapter, "The Bretton Woods International Monetary System: A Historical Overview," Bordo surveyed the origins, operation, and collapse of the system and compared its macroeconomic performance with earlier and later international monetary regimes. He found that the period of full currency convertibility between 1959 and 1971 exhibited comparatively strong stability in both nominal and real economic variables, despite the system's eventual collapse. His analysis identified the problems of international adjustment, liquidity, and confidence, along with the growth of U.S. inflation, as central to understanding the breakdown of Bretton Woods. He also emphasized the importance of credible monetary commitments in sustaining international monetary arrangements.

In "The Gold Pool (1961–1968) and the Fall of the Bretton Woods System," published with Eric Monnet and Alain Naef in The Journal of Economic History in 2019, Bordo examined international central-bank efforts to stabilize the dollar price of gold during the 1960s. The authors found that weaknesses in the British pound and insufficiently credible American monetary policies contributed to the collapse of the Gold Pool, illustrating the difficulties of cooperation among central banks under a system of fixed exchange rates.

Bordo also revisited the Triffin dilemma in "Triffin: Dilemma or Myth?", co-authored with Robert N. McCauley and published in the IMF Economic Review in 2019. The authors reexamined Robert Triffin's argument that the Bretton Woods system contained an inherent contradiction between the international demand for dollar reserves and the United States' ability to maintain dollar convertibility into gold. Comparing the American position after the Second World War with Britain's experience under the gold standard, they argued that the collapse of Bretton Woods was not inevitable and that more appropriate U.S. monetary and fiscal policies could have sustained the system. They also criticized later interpretations of the Triffin dilemma that suggested the dollar's international role necessarily required persistent U.S. current-account deficits. Their research distinguished the historical policy failures that contributed to the collapse of Bretton Woods from the broader difficulties of using a national currency as an international reserve asset.

Bordo has also studied the historical evolution of monetary unions, foreign-exchange intervention, and the international monetary consequences of changes in reserve-currency arrangements. His work on these subjects includes research with Anna J. Schwartz, Owen Humpage, Harold James, Lars Jonung, and other collaborators.

=== Financial crises and financial stability ===
Bordo has conducted historical research on banking crises, currency crises, sovereign debt defaults, and the relationship between monetary institutions and financial instability. Much of this work compares episodes of financial instability across different countries and historical periods to examine common causes and differences in economic consequences.

In "Is the Crisis Problem Growing More Severe?", published with Barry Eichengreen, Daniela Klingebiel, and María Soledad Martínez Pería in Economic Policy in 2001, Bordo compared banking, currency, and twin financial crises across approximately 120 years of economic history. The authors found that financial crises had become more frequent since the collapse of the Bretton Woods system, although they found less evidence that crises had become more severe in their duration or associated output losses. The study also examined differences between industrial and emerging economies, offering a long-run historical perspective on the recurrence of financial instability and the consequences of financial globalization.

Bordo's research with Christopher Meissner has examined the role of foreign-currency debt and currency mismatches in financial instability. In "The Role of Foreign Currency Debt in Financial Crises: 1880–1913 versus 1972–1997," published in the Journal of Banking & Finance in 2006, the authors compared financial crises during the first era of globalization with those of the late twentieth century. They found that foreign-currency borrowing did not necessarily produce financial instability by itself, but that mismatches between foreign-currency liabilities and available foreign-currency resources were important in determining countries' vulnerability to crises.

In subsequent work, Bordo and Meissner investigated the relationship between banking crises and sovereign fiscal crises. Their research examined how government guarantees of financial institutions and banks' holdings of sovereign debt could create reinforcing pressures between public finances and the financial system.

Bordo's research has also examined the effects of economic policy uncertainty on credit availability. In "Economic Policy Uncertainty and the Credit Channel: Aggregate and Bank Level U.S. Evidence over Several Decades" (2016), co-authored with John V. Duca and Christoffer Koch, the authors found that increased economic policy uncertainty reduced U.S. bank lending. Using aggregate data and individual bank balance sheets, they found that the effects were particularly pronounced among banks with weaker capital and liquidity positions. Their estimates indicated that elevated uncertainty reduced annualized bank loan growth by approximately 2.5 percentage points during 2007–2013, potentially contributing to the slow recovery following the Great Recession.

Another strand of Bordo's research examines the relationship between asset-price booms, credit expansion, monetary policy, and financial crises. In "Monetary Policy and Asset Prices: A Look Back at Past U.S. Stock Market Booms" (2004), co-authored with David C. Wheelock, Bordo analyzed historical episodes of rapid increases in U.S. stock prices, including the booms of 1923–1929 and 1994–2000. The authors found that stock-market booms frequently occurred during periods of rapid economic growth and productivity advances, suggesting that they were at least partly driven by economic fundamentals. They found no consistent relationship between consumer-price inflation and stock-market booms, although money and credit growth were generally above average during these episodes. Bordo subsequently examined how credit-driven asset-price booms could contribute to financial crises, drawing comparisons between historical episodes of financial instability and the financial crisis of 2007–2008. His research distinguished asset-price increases supported by economic fundamentals from episodes involving financial vulnerabilities that could threaten banking-system stability.

Bordo has also studied the historical development of lender of last resort policy and the role of central banks in preventing banking panics. In "The Lender of Last Resort: Alternative Views and Historical Experience" (1990), he compared classical lender-of-last-resort doctrines with the historical experiences of banking systems in the United States, Scotland, and Canada. The study examined how emergency liquidity provision, banking institutions, and alternative arrangements for responding to financial distress influenced the incidence and management of banking panics. Bordo used the historical evidence to assess the circumstances under which central-bank intervention could preserve financial stability and the lessons of earlier banking crises for modern monetary policy.

=== Canadian banking history and financial stability ===
Bordo has conducted extensive research on the historical development and comparative stability of the Canadian and American banking systems, examining how differences in banking institutions, regulation, and financial structure influenced the frequency and severity of financial crises. Much of this research, conducted with Angela Redish and Hugh Rockoff, has investigated why Canada experienced fewer systemic banking crises than the United States despite the two countries' close economic ties.

In "The U.S. Banking System from a Northern Exposure: Stability versus Efficiency" (1994), co-authored with Rockoff and Redish, Bordo compared the performance of Canadian and American banks during the twentieth century. The authors found that Canada's nationwide branch banking system offered greater stability than the historically fragmented American system of geographically restricted banks, without clear evidence that this stability came at the expense of higher borrowing costs or lower deposit returns. Their findings challenged the view that Canada's more concentrated banking system necessarily reduced competition and efficiency.

In subsequent research, Bordo, Redish, and Rockoff extended the historical comparison to the period from 1870 to 1925. They found that the two banking systems exhibited relatively similar levels of stability and efficiency before the early twentieth century, despite differences in their organizational structures. The authors examined how the development of larger, geographically diversified Canadian banks and the consolidation of the banking industry helped shape the relative stability of the Canadian financial system.

Bordo returned to this question in "Why Didn't Canada Have a Banking Crisis in 2008 (or in 1930, or 1907, or ...)?", published with Redish and Rockoff in The Economic History Review in 2015. The authors argued that the Canadian banking system's relative resilience during the financial crisis of 2007–2008 reflected institutional arrangements that had developed since the nineteenth century. Canada's concentrated branch-banking structure, combined with relatively unified financial regulation, had incorporated activities such as mortgage lending and investment banking within the regulated banking system. By contrast, the historically fragmented American banking system had encouraged the development of securities markets, investment banks, and the shadow banking system under multiple regulatory authorities. The authors argued that these institutional differences helped explain why Canada avoided the widespread banking failures experienced in the United States during several major financial crises.

=== The Great Depression and monetary instability ===
The Great Depression has been a recurring subject of Bordo's research, particularly the role of monetary contraction, wage rigidity, and banking instability in the economic collapse of the early 1930s.

In "Money, Sticky Wages, and the Great Depression," published with Christopher Erceg and Charles Evans in the American Economic Review in 2000, the authors developed a general-equilibrium model examining how monetary shocks and nominal wage rigidity contributed to the severity and persistence of the Depression in the United States. Their analysis found that monetary contraction operating through inflexible wages could account for important features of the downturn between 1929 and 1933. The paper supported monetary explanations of the Great Depression while emphasizing the role of wage-setting institutions in transmitting monetary disturbances to the real economy.

In "Was Expansionary Monetary Policy Feasible During the Great Contraction? An Examination of the Gold Standard Constraint" (2002), co-authored with Ehsan U. Choudhri and Anna J. Schwartz, Bordo examined whether the gold standard prevented the Federal Reserve from pursuing expansionary monetary policy during the early 1930s. The authors argued that the United States possessed sufficient gold reserves to conduct expansionary monetary policy without undermining gold convertibility. Their model simulations suggested that more aggressive open-market operations could have prevented major banking panics and mitigated the economic contraction.

Bordo also co-edited The Defining Moment: The Great Depression and the American Economy in the Twentieth Century (1998), with Claudia Goldin and Eugene N. White. The volume examined the long-term institutional and economic consequences of the Depression, including the expansion of government intervention, changes in monetary policy, and the development of financial and social insurance arrangements.

His historical comparisons have also addressed the similarities and differences between the Great Depression and the financial crisis of 2007–2008, including the effectiveness of central-bank responses, the role of monetary policy in the financial recoveries, and the historical relationship between credit contractions and economic downturns.

=== Central banking and monetary policy ===
Bordo's research on central banking examines the historical development of monetary institutions, central-bank credibility, monetary-policy rules, inflation, and the role of central banks in responding to financial instability.

His work has frequently considered the relationship between rules-based monetary policy and discretionary intervention. In The Historical Performance of the Federal Reserve: The Importance of Rules (2019), Bordo examined the historical experience of the Federal Reserve, drawing on episodes of monetary stability and instability to assess the role of policy rules in central-bank performance.

His collected research has addressed central-bank independence, inflation targeting, monetary-policy credibility, and the structure of the Federal Reserve. It also includes the historical role of central banks as lenders of last resort and the relationship between monetary policy and financial stability.

Bordo has also written on the stagflation of the 1970s and the subsequent evolution of monetary policy. With Athanasios Orphanides, he edited The Great Inflation: The Rebirth of Modern Central Banking (2013), a collection examining the causes of high inflation in the 1960s and 1970s and its consequences for central-bank policy and institutions.

Bordo investigated the historical relationship between the yield curve, monetary-policy credibility, and future economic growth in research with Joseph G. Haubrich. In "The Yield Curve as a Predictor of Growth: Long-Run Evidence, 1875–1997," published in The Review of Economics and Statistics in 2008, the authors examined whether differences between short-term and long-term interest rates could predict subsequent changes in economic activity across different monetary regimes. They found that the yield curve contained useful information about future economic growth over more than a century, although its predictive ability varied considerably across historical periods and was strongest after the Second World War. In a related 2008 article in Economics Letters, "Forecasting with the Yield Curve: Level, Slope, and Output 1875–1997," they found that incorporating both the level and slope of the yield curve generally improved forecasts of real economic growth compared with using either measure alone. Their research provided historical evidence on the predictive relationship between interest rates and economic activity.

In subsequent research, Bordo and Haubrich examined the role of credit disruptions in economic contractions and recoveries. In "Credit Crises, Money and Contractions: An Historical View," published in the Journal of Monetary Economics in 2010, the authors studied episodes of financial distress in the United States between 1875 and 2007, analyzing the relationships among credit, money, and output over successive business cycles. They found that periods of financial distress generally intensified economic downturns and that recessions were particularly severe when multiple forms of financial distress occurred together.

In "Deep Recessions, Fast Recoveries, and Financial Crises: Evidence from the American Record," published in Economic Inquiry in 2017, Bordo and Haubrich examined whether severe recessions historically produced stronger subsequent recoveries and whether financial crises altered that relationship. They found that deep recessions, including many accompanied by financial crises, were generally followed by relatively rapid recoveries. The authors identified important exceptions, including the recovery from the Great Depression, the recession of the early 1990s, and the recovery following the financial crisis of 2007–2008. They noted that the post-2008 recovery was especially weak relative to earlier historical recoveries and considered the roles of residential investment and economic policy uncertainty in explaining its sluggishness.

In "Perceived FOMC: The Making of Hawks, Doves and Swingers," published with Klodiana Istrefi in the Journal of Monetary Economics in 2023, Bordo examined the determinants of individual monetary-policy preferences within the Federal Open Market Committee (FOMC). The authors investigated how policymakers' educational backgrounds, formative economic experiences, and the changing composition of the committee influenced whether members adopted relatively hawkish or dovish positions. They found that members educated at institutions associated with the Chicago school of economics were more likely to favor tighter monetary policy, while members educated at institutions associated with Keynesian economics or born during periods of high unemployment were more likely to favor accommodative policy. The study also found that changes in the balance of hawks and doves influenced committee decisions, illustrating the role of policymakers' backgrounds and beliefs in the conduct of monetary policy.

Bordo has also examined the role of the regional Federal Reserve Banks in the development of American monetary policy. In research with Edward S. (Ned) Prescott, "Federal Reserve Structure and the Production of Monetary Policy Ideas," the authors investigated how the decentralized structure of the Federal Reserve System contributed to the development and dissemination of new monetary-policy ideas between 1960 and 2000. They documented the role of regional Reserve Banks in advancing monetarism, rational expectations, central-bank credibility, and transparency, often through their connections with academic economists. The authors argued that reforms to the Federal Open Market Committee under William McChesney Martin in the 1950s, together with the Reserve Banks' distinctive public-private governance arrangements, enabled regional institutions to contribute independently to monetary-policy research and debate. They concluded that decentralization encouraged competition among economic ideas and helped reduce the risk of intellectual conformity within the Federal Reserve System.

In subsequent research with Istrefi and Humberto Martínez, Bordo examined the language used in FOMC policy deliberations over approximately four decades. Their study, "Rules vs. Discretion: Decoding FOMC Policy Deliberations," analyzed committee transcripts to investigate how policymakers' references to rules, discretion, credibility, and commitment evolved over time. The authors found that references to monetary-policy rules increased notably during the mid-1990s, while discretionary language became more common during economic downturns and periods of heightened uncertainty. They also associated greater emphasis on rules with more restrictive monetary-policy decisions and greater emphasis on discretion with more accommodative policy.

Bordo's work with Owen Humpage and Anna J. Schwartz, Strained Relations: U.S. Foreign-Exchange Operations and Monetary Policy in the Twentieth Century (2015), examined the history of American foreign-exchange intervention and the institutional relationship between the Federal Reserve and the U.S. Treasury. Their principal finding was that foreign-exchange market intervention was rarely effective except when it was done consistently with deep economic fundamentals. Drawing on historical records and previously confidential foreign-exchange transaction data, the authors found that sterilized foreign-exchange intervention generally did not provide a reliable means of influencing exchange rates independently of monetary policy. Although intervention could occasionally affect exchange rates by conveying information to financial markets, such effects were uncommon. They also argued that foreign-exchange intervention could undermine the credibility and independence of monetary policy when its objectives conflicted with domestic price stability.

More recently, Bordo has examined the implications of digital currencies and financial innovation for monetary institutions. In "Central Bank Digital Currency in Historical Perspective: Another Crossroad in Monetary History," published in Capitalism: A Journal of History and Economics in 2022, Bordo compared contemporary proposals for central bank digital currency (CBDC) with earlier transformations in monetary systems, including the transition from commodity money to fiduciary and fiat money and the consolidation of central-bank note issuance. He argued that technological innovations in money have historically been driven by market incentives while also requiring governments to provide a framework for monetary stability and financial regulation. The article considered how CBDCs might improve monetary-policy implementation and transform domestic and international payment systems.

Bordo has also examined the consequences of stablecoins for the international monetary system. In a 2026 NBER working paper co-authored with Carolyn Wilkins, "Money and Power: Historical Lessons for Stablecoins and U.S. Dollar Dominance," he examined historical conditions for the successful operation of private money and their implications for dollar-denominated stablecoins. The paper emphasized the importance of credible convertibility, transparent backing, consistent regulation, payment infrastructure, and crisis-management arrangements.

=== Financial globalization ===
Bordo has studied the history of international financial integration and the similarities between modern globalization and the earlier period of global capital-market development before the First World War.

In Globalization in Historical Perspective (2003), edited with Alan M. Taylor and Jeffrey G. Williamson, Bordo examined the historical development of international trade, capital flows, and economic integration. His research has compared the first era of globalization, generally dated from approximately 1870 to 1914, with the renewed international financial integration of the late twentieth century.

In research with Christopher Meissner, Bordo examined the relationship between international capital flows, economic growth, and financial crises during the first era of globalization. Their findings suggested that foreign capital was associated with higher long-run income levels, while financial crises linked to capital flows imposed substantial short-run economic costs.

His work on financial globalization has also addressed the historical development of international monetary cooperation, the relationship between financial integration and sovereign debt crises, and the institutional conditions associated with financial stability.

== Professional activities and recognition ==
Bordo served as president of the Economic History Association from 2016 to 2017 and as vice president from 2003 to 2004. He has also held editorial positions with several academic journals, including the International Journal of Central Banking, the Journal of International Money and Finance, the Journal of Economic History, and Explorations in Economic History. He served on the editorial board of the Economic History Review from 2011 to 2018.

He has served as managing editor of Cambridge University Press's Studies in Macroeconomic History series, which publishes scholarship on monetary and macroeconomic history. He has also participated in the organization of academic conferences addressing monetary history, the Federal Reserve, financial crises, and international monetary arrangements.

Bordo has been a member of the Shadow Open Market Committee since 2009, a group of economists that evaluates U.S. monetary policy and offers policy recommendations. He also served on the Federal Reserve System's Centennial Advisory Council from 2011 to 2014 and on the advisory board of Princeton University's Julis-Rabinowitz Center for Public Policy and Finance from 2017 to 2024.

His academic distinctions include the Rutgers University Board of Trustees Award for Excellence in Research in 2000 and the Abraham Scroll Award from the National Association for Business Economics in 2002.

== Selected publications ==
=== Books ===
- Bordo, Michael D., and Anna J. Schwartz, eds. (1984). A Retrospective on the Classical Gold Standard, 1821–1931. University of Chicago Press.
- Bordo, Michael D., and Anna J. Schwartz (1987). Money in Historical Perspective. University of Chicago Press.
- Bordo, Michael D., and Lars Jonung (1987). The Long-Run Behavior of the Velocity of Circulation: The International Evidence. Cambridge University Press. ISBN 9780521326339.
- Bordo, Michael D., and Barry Eichengreen, eds. (1993). A Retrospective on the Bretton Woods System: Lessons for International Monetary Reform. University of Chicago Press.
- Bordo, Michael D., Claudia Goldin, and Eugene N. White, eds. (1998). The Defining Moment: The Great Depression and the American Economy in the Twentieth Century. University of Chicago Press.
- Bordo, Michael D. (1999). The Gold Standard and Related Regimes: Collected Essays. Cambridge University Press.
- Bordo, Michael D., Alan M. Taylor, and Jeffrey G. Williamson, eds. (2003). Globalization in Historical Perspective. University of Chicago Press.
- Bordo, Michael D., and Ronald MacDonald, eds. (2012). Credibility and the International Monetary Regime. Cambridge University Press.
- Bordo, Michael D., and Athanasios Orphanides, eds. (2013). The Great Inflation: The Rebirth of Modern Central Banking. University of Chicago Press.
- Bordo, Michael D., and William Roberds, eds. (2013). The Origins, History, and Future of the Federal Reserve: A Return to Jekyll Island. Cambridge University Press.
- Bordo, Michael D., Owen F. Humpage, and Anna J. Schwartz (2015). Strained Relations: U.S. Foreign-Exchange Operations and Monetary Policy in the Twentieth Century. University of Chicago Press.
- Bordo, Michael D., and Mark A. Wynne, eds. (2016). The Federal Reserve's Role in the Global Economy: A Historical Perspective. Cambridge University Press.
- Bordo, Michael D., and John B. Taylor, eds. (2017). Rules for International Monetary Stability. Hoover Institution Press.
- Bordo, Michael D. (2019). The Historical Performance of the Federal Reserve: The Importance of Rules. Hoover Institution Press.
- Bordo, Michael D., John H. Cochrane, and John B. Taylor, eds. (2023). How Monetary Policy Got Behind the Curve—and How to Get Back. Hoover Institution Press.
- Bordo, Michael D., John H. Cochrane, and John B. Taylor, eds. (2024). Getting Monetary Policy Back on Track. Hoover Institution Press. ISBN 9780817926243.
- Bordo, Michael D., John H. Cochrane, and John B. Taylor, eds. (2025). Getting Global Monetary Policy on Track. Hoover Institution Press. ISBN 9780817926649.
- Bordo, Michael D., Jeffrey M. Lacker, Mickey D. Levy, and John B. Taylor, eds. (2025). Fifty Years of the Shadow Open Market Committee: A Retrospective on Its Role in Monetary Policy. Hoover Institution Press.

=== Selected articles ===
- Bordo, Michael David (1975). "The Income Effects of the Sources of Monetary Change: An Historical Approach." Economic Inquiry 13 (4): 505–525. doi:10.1111/j.1465-7295.1975.tb00266.x.
- Bordo, Michael D. (1975). "John E. Cairnes on the Effects of the Australian Gold Discoveries, 1851–73: An Early Application of the Methodology of Positive Economics." History of Political Economy 7 (3): 337–359.
- Bordo, Michael David (1977). "The Income Effects of the Sources of New Money: A Comparison of the United States and the United Kingdom, 1870–1913." Explorations in Economic History 14 (1): 20–43. doi:10.1016/0014-4983(77)90013-4.
- Bordo, Michael David (1980). "The Effects of Monetary Change on Relative Commodity Prices and the Role of Long-Term Contracts." Journal of Political Economy 88 (6): 1088–1109. doi:10.1086/260930.
- Bordo, Michael David (1981). "The Classical Gold Standard: Some Lessons for Today." Federal Reserve Bank of St. Louis Review 63 (5): 2–17.
- Bordo, Michael D. (1984). "The Gold Standard: The Traditional Approach." In A Retrospective on the Classical Gold Standard, 1821–1931, edited by Michael D. Bordo and Anna J. Schwartz, pp. 23–120. University of Chicago Press. doi:10.7208/9780226066929-003.
- Bordo, Michael D. (1990). "The Lender of Last Resort: Alternative Views and Historical Experience." Federal Reserve Bank of Richmond Economic Review 76 (1): 18–29.
- Bordo, Michael D., and Eugene N. White (1991). "A Tale of Two Currencies: British and French Finance During the Napoleonic Wars." The Journal of Economic History 51 (2): 303–316. doi:10.1017/S002205070003895X.
- Bordo, Michael D. (1993). "The Gold Standard, Bretton Woods and Other Monetary Regimes: An Historical Appraisal." Federal Reserve Bank of St. Louis Review 75 (2): 123–191.
- Bordo, Michael D. (1993). "The Bretton Woods International Monetary System: A Historical Overview." In A Retrospective on the Bretton Woods System: Lessons for International Monetary Reform, edited by Michael D. Bordo and Barry Eichengreen, pp. 3–108. University of Chicago Press. doi:10.7208/9780226066905-002.
- Bordo, Michael D., Hugh Rockoff, and Angela Redish (1994). "The U.S. Banking System from a Northern Exposure: Stability versus Efficiency." The Journal of Economic History 54 (2): 325–341.
- Bordo, Michael D., and Finn E. Kydland (1995). "The Gold Standard as a Rule: An Essay in Exploration." Explorations in Economic History 32 (4): 423–464. doi:10.1006/exeh.1995.1019.
- Bordo, Michael D., Hugh Rockoff, and Angela Redish (1996). "A Comparison of the Stability and Efficiency of the Canadian and American Banking Systems, 1870–1925." Financial History Review 3 (1): 49–68. doi:10.1017/S0968565000000494.
- Bordo, Michael D., and Hugh Rockoff (1996). "The Gold Standard as a 'Good Housekeeping Seal of Approval'." The Journal of Economic History 56 (2): 389–428.
- Bordo, Michael D., and Anna J. Schwartz (1999). "Monetary Policy Regimes and Economic Performance: The Historical Record." Handbook of Macroeconomics 1: 149–234.
- Bordo, Michael D., Christopher J. Erceg, and Charles L. Evans (2000). "Money, Sticky Wages, and the Great Depression." American Economic Review 90 (5): 1447–1463.
- Bordo, Michael D., Barry Eichengreen, Daniela Klingebiel, and María Soledad Martínez Pería (2001). "Is the Crisis Problem Growing More Severe?" Economic Policy 16 (32): 52–82. doi:10.1111/1468-0327.00070.
- Bordo, Michael D., Ehsan U. Choudhri, and Anna J. Schwartz (2002). "Was Expansionary Monetary Policy Feasible During the Great Contraction? An Examination of the Gold Standard Constraint." Explorations in Economic History 39 (1): 1–28. doi:10.1006/exeh.2001.0778.
- Bordo, Michael D., and Angela Redish (2004). "Is Deflation Depressing? Evidence from the Classical Gold Standard." In Deflation: Current and Historical Perspectives. Cambridge University Press.
- Bordo, Michael D., and David C. Wheelock (2004). "Monetary Policy and Asset Prices: A Look Back at Past U.S. Stock Market Booms." Federal Reserve Bank of St. Louis Review 86 (6): 19–44.
- Bordo, Michael D., and Andrew Filardo (2005). "Deflation and Monetary Policy in a Historical Perspective: Remembering the Past or Being Condemned to Repeat It?" Economic Policy 20 (44): 800–844. doi:10.1111/j.1468-0327.2005.00151.x.
- Bordo, Michael D., and Christopher M. Meissner (2006). "The Role of Foreign Currency Debt in Financial Crises: 1880–1913 versus 1972–1997." Journal of Banking & Finance 30 (12): 3299–3329.
- Bordo, Michael D., and Joseph G. Haubrich (2008). "The Yield Curve as a Predictor of Growth: Long-Run Evidence, 1875–1997." The Review of Economics and Statistics 90 (1): 182–185. doi:10.1162/rest.90.1.182.
- Bordo, Michael D., and Joseph G. Haubrich (2008). "Forecasting with the Yield Curve: Level, Slope, and Output 1875–1997." Economics Letters 99 (1): 48–50. doi:10.1016/j.econlet.2007.05.026.
- Bordo, Michael D., John Landon-Lane, and Angela Redish (2009). "Good versus Bad Deflation: Lessons from the Gold Standard Era." In Monetary Policy in Low-Inflation Economies. Cambridge University Press.
- Bordo, Michael D., and Joseph G. Haubrich (2010). "Credit Crises, Money and Contractions: An Historical View." Journal of Monetary Economics 57 (1): 1–18. doi:10.1016/j.jmoneco.2009.10.015.
- Bordo, Michael D., and Hugh Rockoff (2013). "The Influence of Irving Fisher on Milton Friedman's Monetary Economics." Journal of the History of Economic Thought 35 (2): 153–177.
- Bordo, Michael D., Angela Redish, and Hugh Rockoff (2015). "Why Didn't Canada Have a Banking Crisis in 2008 (or in 1930, or 1907, or ...)?" The Economic History Review 68 (1): 218–243. doi:10.1111/1468-0289.665.*
- Bordo, Michael D., and Christopher M. Meissner (2016). "Fiscal and Financial Crises." Handbook of Macroeconomics 2: 355–412. doi:10.1016/bs.hesmac.2016.04.001.
- Bordo, Michael D., John V. Duca, and Christoffer Koch (2016). "Economic Policy Uncertainty and the Credit Channel: Aggregate and Bank Level U.S. Evidence over Several Decades." Journal of Financial Stability 26: 90–106. doi:10.1016/j.jfs.2016.07.002.
- Bordo, Michael D., and Joseph G. Haubrich (2017). "Deep Recessions, Fast Recoveries, and Financial Crises: Evidence from the American Record." Economic Inquiry 55 (1): 527–541. doi:10.1111/ecin.12374.
- Bordo, Michael D., Eric Monnet, and Alain Naef (2019). "The Gold Pool (1961–1968) and the Fall of the Bretton Woods System: Lessons for Central Bank Cooperation." The Journal of Economic History 79 (4): 1027–1059.
- Bordo, Michael D., and Robert N. McCauley (2019). "Triffin: Dilemma or Myth?" IMF Economic Review 67 (4): 824–851. doi:10.1057/s41308-019-00088-y.
- Bordo, Michael D. (2022). "Central Bank Digital Currency in Historical Perspective: Another Crossroad in Monetary History." Capitalism: A Journal of History and Economics 3 (2): 421–442. doi:10.1353/cap.2022.0015.
- Bordo, Michael D., and Klodiana Istrefi (2023). "Perceived FOMC: The Making of Hawks, Doves and Swingers." Journal of Monetary Economics 136: 125–143. doi:10.1016/j.jmoneco.2023.03.001.
- Bordo, Michael D., and Edward S. Prescott (2023). "Federal Reserve Structure and the Production of Monetary Policy Ideas." Federal Reserve Bank of Cleveland Working Paper No. 23-29. doi:10.26509/frbc-wp-202329.
- Bordo, Michael D., Klodiana Istrefi, and Humberto Martínez (2024). "Rules vs. Discretion: Decoding FOMC Policy Deliberations." NBER Working Paper No. 33262. Revised March 2025. doi:10.3386/w33262.
- Bordo, Michael D. (2026). "The Future of Monetarism after Milton Friedman." Federal Reserve Bank of St. Louis Review 108 (8): 1–8. doi:10.20955/r.2026.08.
- Bordo, Michael D., and Carolyn Wilkins (2026). "Money and Power: Historical Lessons for Stablecoins and U.S. Dollar Dominance." NBER Working Paper No. 35768.
