= Steven Prohira =

American physicist

- Education: Gonzaga University (B.A.); University of Kansas (MS, PhD)
- Awards: MacArthur Prize (2022)
- Scientific career
- Fields: Physicist
- Workplaces: Ohio State University, University of Kansas

Steven Prohira is an American physicist who works as a professor at the University of Kansas. He specializes in studying neutrinos. He was awarded the MacArthur Fellowship in 2022.

== Biography ==
Prohira attended the Regis Jesuit High School in Colorado. Prohira then attended the Gonzaga University, where he earned a Bachelors of Arts in 2009, specializing in fine arts. He emphasized drawing and woodblock prints. His art became focused on scientific questions, however.

He went on to attend the University of Kansas, where he enrolled in a MFA program but ultimately changed his pathway to a MS in physics. He received an award from the Kansas Biological Survey. He then earned his PhD from the same university, graduating in 2018.

He worked as a postdoctoral researcher at Ohio State University in their Cosmology and AstroParticle Physics department, before becoming an assistant professor at the University of Kansas.

His research began focusing on utilizing large sheets of remote ice to detect neutrinos. He has also proposed the use of trees as natural antennas to help detect neutrinos by their radio waves.

He was awarded the MacArthur Fellowship in 2022.

== Personal life ==
He resides in Lawrence, Kansas.
