= Angela Redish =

Canadian professor of economics

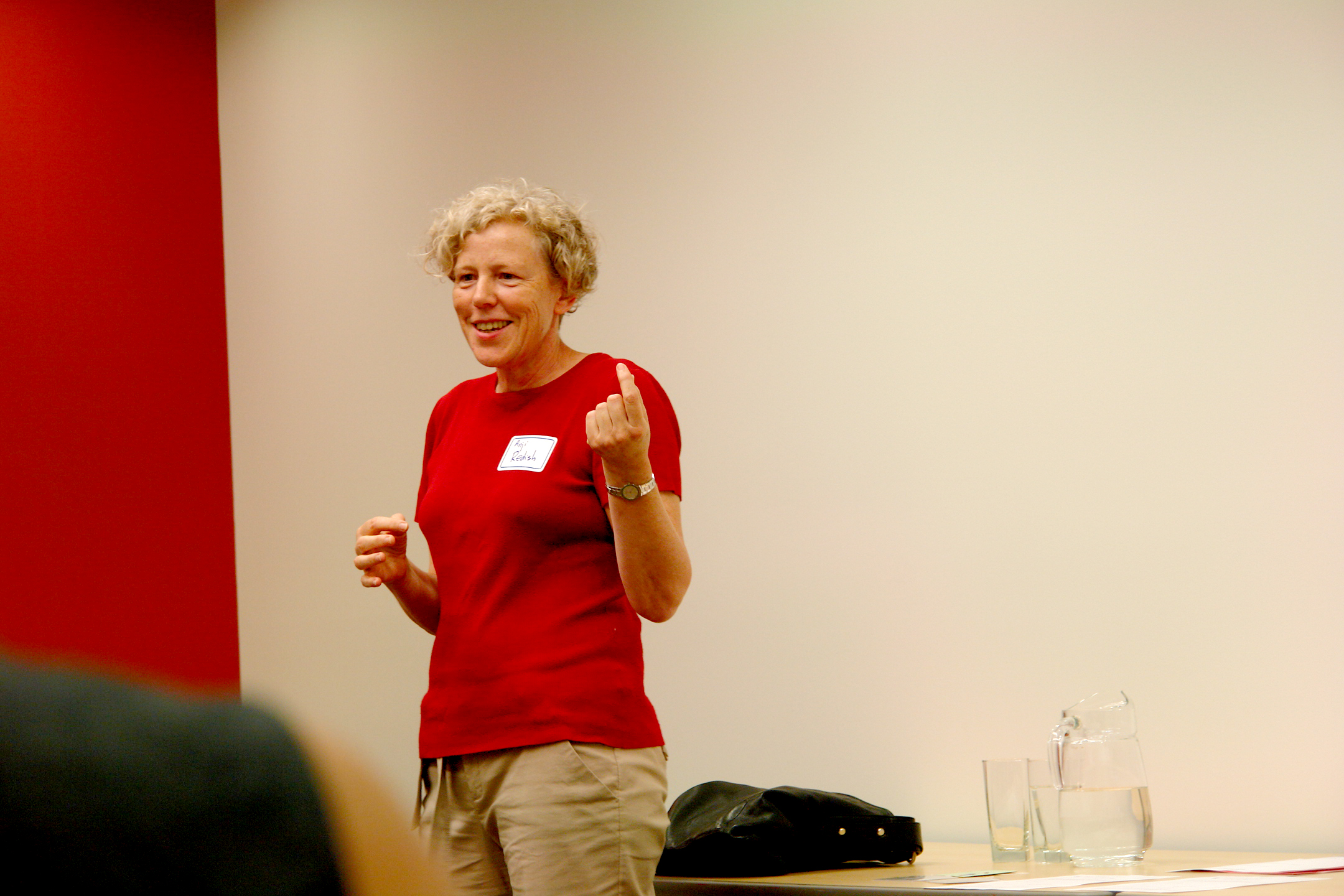
- Redish in 2013
- Born: United Kingdom

Academic background
- Education: B.A., economics, Wilfrid Laurier University; PhD, University of Western Ontario

Academic work
- Institutions: University of British Columbia

Angela Redish is a professor of economics at the Vancouver School of Economics at the University of British Columbia and served as President of the Canadian Economics Association in 2018-19. From 2001 to 2006, Redish served as the Head of Department of Economics at the University of British Columbia and was awarded The President's Medal of Excellence by the University of British Columbia in 2018 for her contributions towards establishing the Vancouver School of Economics. Redish was named a Fellow of the Canadian Economics Association in 2025, in recognition of her achievements and contributions to the discipline.

== Education and work ==
Redish was born in United Kingdom and moved to Hamilton, Ontario, Canada with her family during her teen years. She graduated from Wilfrid Laurier University having earned a B.A. in economics. Following this, she took a two-year break to work at Cuso International as a volunteer in Papua New Guinea. Upon returning to Canada, she received a Ph.D. from the University of Western Ontario. Shortly after, she joined the University of British Columbia as an assistant professor of economics at the Vancouver School of Economics. She went on to work as a senior adviser to then UBC Vancouver President Stephen Toope, acting as a faculty liaison and providing advice on the university budget and government relations. From 2012 to 2015, Redish was Vice Provost and then Associate Vice-President. From 2015 to July 2017 she served as a Provost and Vice President Academic pro tem.

Redish is best known for her research regarding the history of monetary and banking systems within Europe and North America. Her research interests include central bank, monetary economics, financial system, macroeconomics and capital market. In most research papers, Redish frequently collaborates with Michael D. Bordo, a Canadian economist and professor of economics at Rutgers University. She has multiple published articles in journals such as The Economic History Review, Canadian Journal of Economics, The Journal of Economic History and the European Economic Review. According to IDEAS/RePEc, Redish has been ranked in the top 5% of number of distinct works weighted by recursive impact factor and number of authors.

== Research ==
=== "Why didn't Canada have a banking crisis in 2008 (or in 1930, or 1907)?" (2015) ===
A major area of Redish's research revolves around the financial system and monetary economics. Together with Hugh Rockoff, a professor of economics at Rutgers University, and Michael D. Bordo, Redish analyzes Canada's position as an outlier in the 2008 financial crisis that engulfed the entirety of the US banking system as well as many other significant European countries. Redish along with Bordo and Rockoff strongly argue that the structure of financial systems is path-dependent and the source of the relative stability within the Canadian banks in the 2008 financial crisis came from Canada's distinct financial structure which involved innate Canadian conservatism and superior Canadian regulation.

Unlike the United States, Canada's Federal government was given the power to charter and regulate banks. In the United States, the Constitution did not unambiguously give the Federal government power over banking. Upon examining her findings, Redish concludes that in the US unregulated or lightly regulated sectors of the financial system (shadow banking system) proved to be the source of majority of their trouble. Despite reforms, the fundamental structural weaknesses of the U.S. financial system, a fragmented banking system, regulated by a patchwork of regulatory agencies, it survived unharmed.

Redish argues that the growth of the shadow banking system along with an ideological turn toward lesser regulated markets and political clout of regulated industries achieved through lobbying and campaign contributions were the prominent causes of the various failures of the US banking system. The consequence was that the systemic risk that led to the 2008 financial crisis. However, the Canadian concentrated banking system that had evolved by the end of the twentieth century had absorbed the key sources of systemic risk—the mortgage market and investment banking—and was tightly regulated by one overarching regulator.

=== "The evolution of financial inter-mediation: Evidence from 19th-century Ontario micro-data" (2015) ===
Redish co-authors this paper with Livio Di Matteo, an economist and professor of economics at Lakehead University. Redish and Di Matteo analyze the micro-data of Ontario descendants in terms of an individual's asset holdings in the 19th century to illustrate the substantial growth of the early Canadian banking system and evolving nature of monetary liabilities. Upon gathering data from inventories of 7,516 probated estate files of Ontario decedents in the years 1802 and 1902, Redish examines the impact of these determinants of an individual's asset monetary holdings as well as the role of demographic, geographic and economic factors in the growth of the banking system.

From 1871 to 1913 the banking sector grew relative to the size of the Canadian economy, specifically Ontario, Canada's largest province, in the 1890s accounted for the greatest economic output. The nature of bank liabilities changed dramatically: in 1871, 32% of the monetary liabilities of the Canadian banks were notes in circulation, while by 1913 that ratio had fallen to 9.5%. The data collected from the late 19th century allowed Redish and Di Matteo to link the individuals to census data and study the trends at a macroeconomic level.

Analyzing the micro-data with Di Matteo, Redish finds that the expansion of deposit banking happened at a macroeconomic level rather than a micro-economic level, and this was correlated with the expansion of the branch network of the banking system. Upon further exploring the data Redish and Di Matteo believe wealth and urbanization are crucial factors in explaining the growth of deposit banking, however, the significance of a dummy variable for 1902 points to other time-correlated factors such as innovations in transportation and new advancements in financial technology that lowered costs and facilitated access to banking services.

=== "Central Banks: Past, Present, Future" (2012) ===
This paper is co-written by Redish and Olga Marcela Namen Leon, a faculty member of the department of economics at the Del Rosario University. This research delves into one of Redish's key area of interest regarding the financial system, it provides an insight into the authorization and formation of central banks in a historical context with the goal of understanding the rationale behind the European Central Bank. During the twentieth century, central banks constantly transformed each decade to play four crucial roles in an economy: fiscal support, financial stability support, monetary support and micro-economic support. Redish and Leon provide examples from the past regarding each of the aforementioned roles such as: in western economies the macroeconomic motive dominated after World War II; during the last two decades of the 20th century the monetary stability goal dominated. Upon analyzing the evolution of established banks in the 20th century, Redish and Leon observe that the fiscal role of central banks dominated in the early days of central banking.

In the early 21st century, the nature of money changed and the financial stability role dominated. The deviation from macroeconomic stability and fiscal contributions of central banks, along with a belief that the ‘market’ would support illiquid but solvent financial institutions created an environment where central bank independence took pride of place. Redish believes this encouraged the creation of a central bank that was not tied to a particular sovereign and had greater independence than any central bank to date —the European Central Bank. Redish and Leon stress that the mandates of central banks have evolved in response to three factors: the existence of alternative sources of funds for the sovereign, the prevailing economic theory or broader set of philosophical beliefs, and the technology of money.

=== "Deflation, Productivity Shocks and Gold: Evidence from the 1880–1914 Period" (2010) ===
In this paper, Redish along with Michael D. Bordo and John Landon-Lane, a professor of economics at Rutgers University, explore the time period between 1880 and 1914 which was characterized by secular deflation and the possibility of a similar deflationary situation occurring in the early 21st century between 2000 and 2004. Redish examines this possible circumstance with a historical perspective and she largely focuses on the experience of deflation in the late 19th century when most of the countries in the world adhered to the classical gold standard versus 2005's monetary environment.

Redish states that there were salient factors that illustrated the economic environment before 1914 being similar to today's environment (early 21st century). Firstly, the level of deflation, indicated by the GNP deflator, before 1914 in U.S. declined at an average rate of 1.0–1.5% per year from 1880 to 1896. Secondly, technological advancement and productivity grew at a significant rate due to the emergence of iron and steel industries particularly in Germany and US. Third, the price level at the time was anchored by a credible nominal anchor—adherence to gold convertibility. In today's environment, many believe the price level has anchored to inflationary expectations in a similar way. Lastly, the late 19th century was an era of globalization—similar to the conditions today.

Additionally, Bordo, Landon-Lane and Redish distinguish between good and bad deflation. They assert that good deflation occurs when it is caused due to a supply shock while bad deflation occurs when it is due to a demand shock. The paper focuses on the price level, by following the gold standard, as a form of growth within four countries within the time period 1880 to 1914: United States, United Kingdom, France and Germany.

Redish and her co-authors note that towards the end of the 20th century inflation rates were extremely low while some countries experienced deflation, despite this the output growth rates remained positive. Not since the turn of the 19th century has economies experienced such low inflation associated with non-negative growth. Their results from the research showed that the deflation in the gold standard era within all the four countries reflected both positive aggregate supply and negative money supply shocks. Yet the negative money shock had only a minor effect on output. Redish believes the reason behind this was the aggregate supply curve which was very steep in the short run. The authors conclude that the gathered evidence suggests that deflation in the late 19th century was primarily good, similar to the situation at the end of the 20th century.

Redish also highlights some key differences between the two time periods that have been compared. Between 1880 and 1914, the four countries that followed the classical gold standard regime, under which linked them together through common adherence to the gold standard convertibility rule, had all faced a common money shock—the vagaries of the gold standard unlike the end of the 20th century. They emphasize the zero nominal bound problem made it difficult to conduct monetary policy by conventional means which was not an issue during the late 19th century.

== Other research ==
- "Putting the 'System' in the International Monetary System" (2013) This paper examines the transition from spontaneous order in 1850 to designed system and then back towards spontaneous order in the late 20th century. It is argued that this transformation is embedded within deep evolving political fundamentals including the rise of democracy, nationalism, fascism and communism and two world wars. (with Michael D. Bordo)
- "A model of commodity money with minting and melting" (2011) This paper involves "constructing a random matching model of a monetary economy with commodity money in the form of potentially different types of silver coins that are distinguishable by the quantity of metal they contain... [The] model provides theoretical support for the view that decisions about coin sizes and types during the medieval period reflected a desire to improve the economic welfare of the general population." (with Warren E. Weber)
- "A Model of Small Change Shortages" (2008) This paper, written with Warren E. Weber, discusses how smaller coin is used to make change in some transactions, and shortages of small coins hurts the poor. The predictions of the model are evaluated against England's experience with silver and gold coins.
