= Carolyn Wilkins =

Carolyn Wilkins may refer to:

- Carolyn A. Wilkins, Canadian economist
- Carolyn F. Wilkins (born 1945), Australian botanist
