= Regis Jesuit High School =

Catholic high school in Colorado, US

Location
- 6300/6400 South Lewiston Way; Aurora, Colorado 80016; United States; 39°36′0″N 104°47′58″W

Information
- School type: Private Catholic Coed college preparatory high school
- Motto: Latin: Ad Maiorem Dei Gloriam English: For the Greater Glory of God
- Religious affiliation: Catholic Church (Jesuit)
- Established: 1877 (149 years ago)
- Chairman: Lawrence Finch ’74
- Principal: Jimmy Tricco
- Faculty: 126.1 (on an FTE basis)
- Grades: 9–12
- Enrollment: 1,654 (2015–16)
- Student to teacher ratio: 13.1
- Colors: Red and white
- Athletics conference: CHSAA, AAAAA, Continental
- Accreditation: AdvancED
- Affiliation: JSEA
- Website: www.regisjesuit.com

Regis Jesuit High School is a private, Catholic, college preparatory high school administered by the Central and Southern Province of the Society of Jesus in Aurora, Colorado. Founded by the Jesuits in 1877, the school shares much of its history with Regis University in neighboring Denver, Colorado. The school is a member of the Jesuit Schools Network The school is located in the Archdiocese of Denver.

== History ==
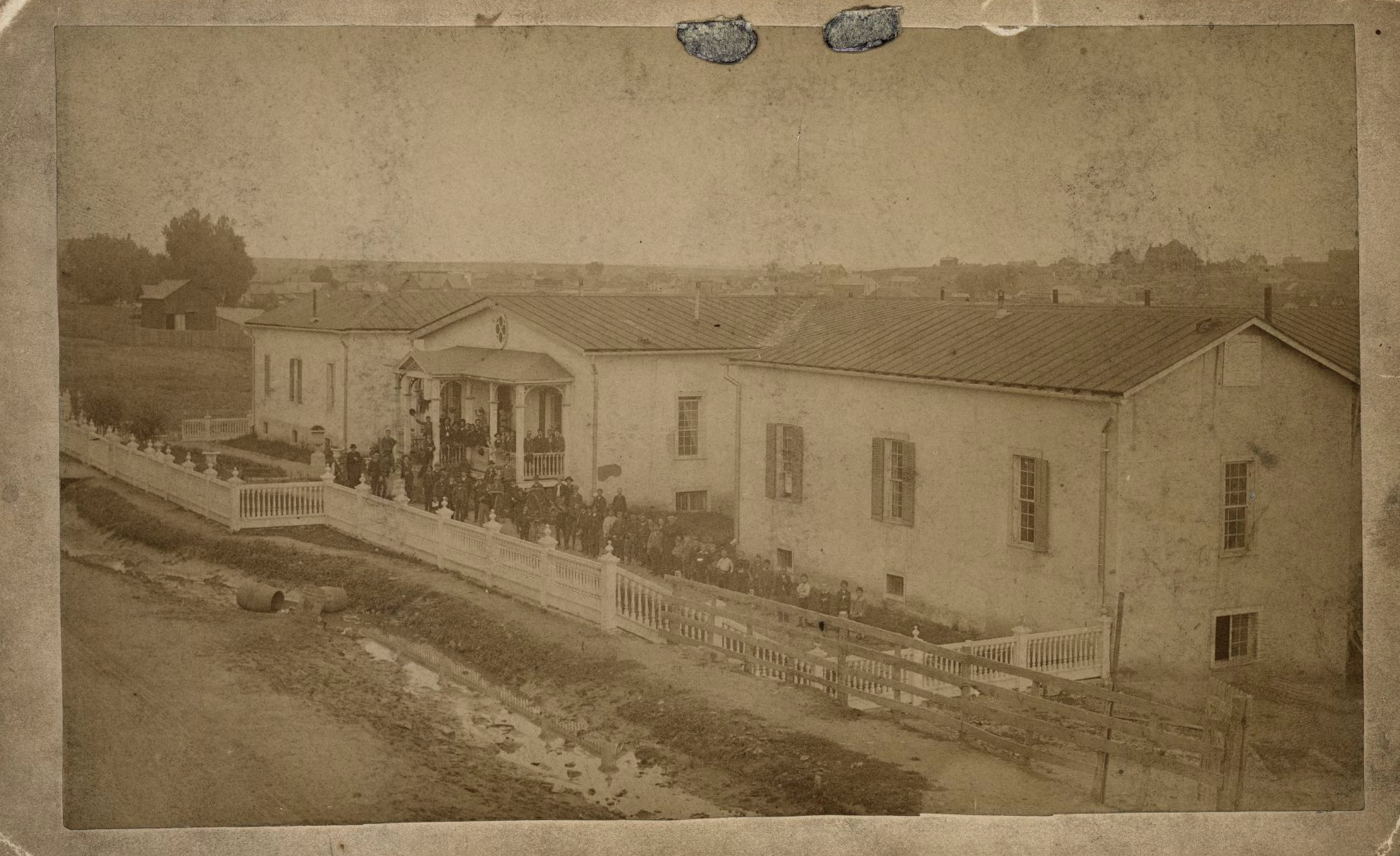
Original location in Las Vegas, New Mexico, c. 1880

The school was founded by Italian Jesuits in 1877 in Las Vegas, New Mexico. Seven years later, another campus was established in Morrison, Colorado. In 1888, the two schools were merged and renamed for St. John Francis Regis to become Regis College, located on 52nd and Lowell Streets in Denver, Colorado. In 1921, the school was formally split into Regis High School and Regis College (now Regis University). The high school and university coexisted on the Denver campus, sharing facilities until a dedicated building was constructed for the high school in 1984. In 1989, a parcel of land near Parker and Arapahoe Roads in Aurora was donated to the school. That area is now called the Campbell Campus, and it houses both the Girls and Boys Divisions. In 2016 Regis appointed David Card as president, the first layperson to hold that position.

== Demographics ==
The demographic breakdown of the 1,654 students enrolled in 2015–16 was:

- Native American/Alaskan – 0.2%
- Asian/Pacific islanders – 5.3%
- Black – 3.9%
- Hispanic – 8.4%
- White – 81.9%
- Multiracial – 0.3%

== Athletics ==
As of 2018, Regis Jesuit had won 67 State Championships, with 54 for boys since 1988. The girls by their 13th year of existence had won 12 championships (including Spirit in 2010). This places Regis 6th in the state in number of State Championships. In 2013, Sports Illustrated selected Regis as having the best high school athletics program in Colorado.

Season	Sport	Number of Championships	Year
Fall	Cross Country, Boys	1	2009
Fall	Spirit	1	2010
Fall	Golf, Boys	8	2017, 2016, 2015, 2013, 2012, 2011, 2010
Fall	Field Hockey, Girls	1	2018
Fall	Tennis, Boys	4	2018, 2010, 2000, 1991
Fall	Soccer, Boys	4	1996, 1995, 1992, 1991
Winter	Basketball, Boys	3	2011, 2010, 2009
Winter	Basketball, Girls	3	2014, 2013, 2009
Winter	Hockey	7	2024, 2019, 2018, 2016, 2012, 2009, 2008
Winter	Swimming, Girls	4	2014, 2013, 2011
Spring	Golf, Girls	4	2015, 2014, 2012, 2010
Spring	Baseball	2	2011,2019 1988 kid
Spring	Lacrosse, Boys	4	2018, 2016, 2014, 2011
Spring	Swimming, Boys	23	2022, 2018, 2014, 2013, 2012, 2011, 2009, 2008, 2007, 2006, 2005, 2004, 2003, 2002, 2001, 2000, 1999, 1998, 1997, 1996, 1995, 1993, 1992
Total		68	

== Notable alumni ==
- Fran Belibi (Class of 2019), former College basketball player for the Stanford Cardinal of the Pac-12 Conference and winner of the 2021 NCAA Division I women's basketball tournament.
- Ty Blach, Major League Baseball (Class of 2009) pitcher for the Colorado Rockies
- C. Michael Callihan (Class of 1965), 42nd Lt. Governor of Colorado. Previously Gunnison County Assessor, Colorado State Representative, Colorado State Senator
- J. V. Cunningham, poet
- Roger Espinoza (Class of 2005), Honduras national football team.
- John Fante (Class of 1927), Italian-American novelist, short-story writer, and screenwriter
- Zach Fenoglio (Class of 2007), hooker for the Glendale Raptors and USA Eagles and a starter in the 2015 Rugby World Cup; was also a chemistry teacher at Regis Jesuit High School.
- Missy Franklin (Class of 2013), Olympic gold medal swimmer and world record holder.
- Bill Garnett, former NBA player for the Dallas Mavericks and Indiana Pacers.
- Chris Hardwick, television host and comedian; previously the host of Singled Out and current host of The Nerdist Podcast, @midnight, The Talking Dead and The Wall on NBC.
- Joseph G. Haubrich, American economist widely known for his yield-curve research
- Jake Heimlicher (Class of 2018), college football defensive end for the Penn Quakers and the UCLA Bruins
- Neil Hopkins (Class of 1995), television and film actor
- Klint Kubiak (Class of 2005), head coach for the Las Vegas Raiders
- John Carroll Lynch (Class of 1981), actor on The Drew Carey Show and more.
- John Matthews (Class of 2004), wide receiver, American professional football
- Tim Miller (political strategist) (Class of 2000)
- Brian Mullan (Class of 1997), professional soccer player, one of four players to have won five or more MLS Cup titles.
- Josh Perkins (2014 - transferred), professional basketball player for Hapoel Gilboa Galil of the Israeli Basketball Premier League.
- David Peterson (Class of 2014), first round pick in the 2017 MLB Draft by the New York Mets
- Jack Swigert, test pilot for NASA and astronaut with the Apollo 13 crew; elected to Congress for Colorado's 6th district, but died before being sworn in.

== See also ==
- List of Jesuit sites
- Regis University
