= Carolyn A. Wilkins =

Canadian economist

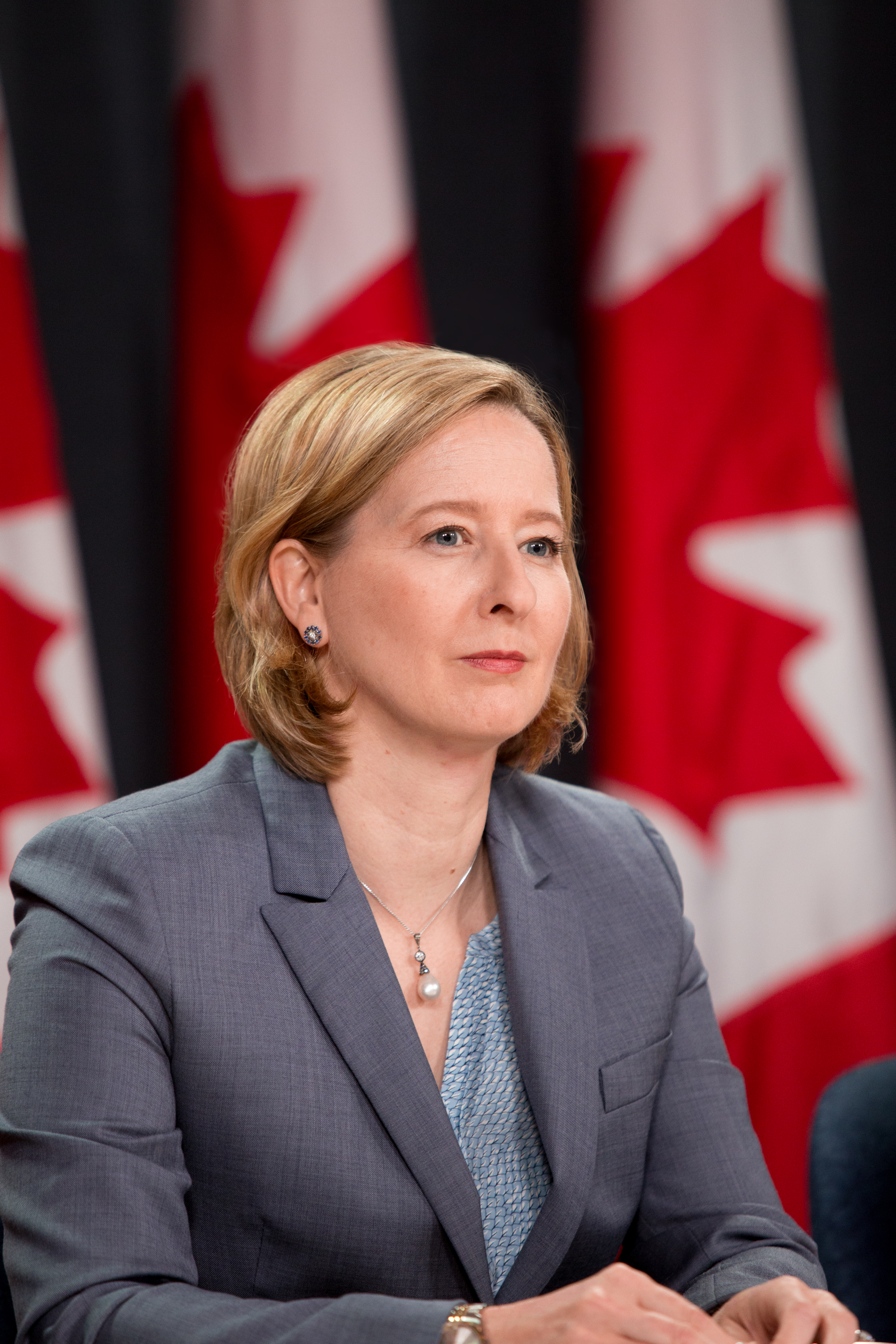

Senior Deputy Governor of the Bank of Canada
- In office May 2, 2014 – December 9, 2020

Personal details
- Born: Peterborough, Ontario
- Education: Wilfrid Laurier University (BA, 1987); University of Western Ontario (MA,1988)

Carolyn A. Wilkins is a Canadian economist. She served as Senior Deputy Governor of the Bank of Canada. from May 2, 2014 to December 9, 2020. Wilkins was the first woman to hold the position of Senior Deputy Governor, the highest position ever held by a woman at the Bank of Canada.

== Early life and education ==
Wilkins was raised in Selwyn, Ontario. In 1987 she earned a BA in Economics from Wilfrid Laurier University. While at Laurier, Wilkins worked for Pierre Siklos, a professor specializing in monetary policy in the School of Business and Economics. She spent two semesters as a co-op student working at the Ontario Ministry of Treasury and Economics and another working in marketing at IBM.

In 1988 she earned an MA in Economics from Western University in London, Ontario.

== Career ==
Wilkins worked at the Department of Finance Canada and the Privy Council Office under the governments of Brian Mulroney, Kim Campbell and Jean Chrétien. The roles she held in these institutions were senior analytical posts that involved economic forecasting and fiscal policy development.

=== The Bank of Canada ===
Wilkins joined the Bank of Canada in 2001, where she held the positions of Deputy Chief of the Financial Market Department, Special Director of Over-the-counter Derivatives Market Initiatives, and Chief of the Financial Stability Department. From August 2013 Wilkins was Advisor to the Governor. She was appointed Senior Deputy Governor in May 2014.

The Senior Deputy Governor is a member of the Governing Council, which sets the policy interest rate, and in this role shares the duty and responsibility for making decisions regarding monetary policy and financial system stability. As Senior Deputy Governor, Wilkins was the Bank's G20 and G7 Deputy. Wilkins was also a member of the IMF's High Level Advisory Group on FinTech. She represented Canada on the Basel Committee on Banking Supervision (BCBS) and co-chaired the BCBS Working Group on Liquidity.

Although she was considered the front-runner to replace Stephen Poloz, Wilkins was passed over for the job as Governor in 2020. She chose to not seek a second term as Senior Deputy Governor, and left the Bank of Canada in December 2020, five months before her seven-year term would have finished in May 2021. During her time as Senior Deputy Governor, Wilkins was credited with steering the roll-out of the central bank's unprecedented quantitative easing stimulus program enacted amid the coronavirus pandemic.

=== Since 2020 ===
Wilkins was appointed to the board of Canadian insurer Intact Financial Corporation on 1 February 2021.

On 21 June 2021, Wilkins began a three year term as an external member of the Bank of England's Financial Policy Committee, which monitors risk to financial stability.

Wilkins was a member of the three-person expert panel that conducted an eight-month review of the Reserve Bank of Australia's (RBA) governance and processes. Announced on 20 July 2022, the review proceeded in the wake of COVID-19 and the subsequent inflation, and was the first wide-ranging review of the RBA since the 1990s.

On 1 March 2022, Princeton University's Griswold Center for Economic Policy Studies announced the appointment of Wilkins as a Senior Research Scholar.

Wilkins sits on the Advisory Council of the Coalition for a Better Future, a group that aims to ensure governments enact policies "that help Canadians live better and win globally while making sustainable growth a top priority."

== Policy views ==
Monetary Policy Wilkins argues monetary policy should emphasize shorter-term stabilization objectives, and "we need to keep it simple: focus on clear objectives that monetary policy can actually achieve." She says "We must also ensure that the right supporting policy tools and measures are available in extraordinary circumstances."

She has stressed the importance of a diversity of views in developing monetary policy. According to Bank of Nova Scotia economist Derek Holt, Wilkins was "the only example of walking the walk and talking the talk on diversity and inclusion on the BoC's Governing Council."

Crypto products Wilkins says she does not regard crypto products as currency because "they do not perform any of the key functions of money." However, crypto could have financial stability implications. Since crypto assets are unregulated, they present financial risk, so "we need a sharpened focus on consumer and investor protection, and market integrity. These are foundational elements of a sound financial system because they support trust."

Canada's economic performance To improve Canadians' prosperity and quality of life, the country must expand its capacity to grow in a sustainable fashion according to Wilkins. Policies to achieve this include raising business investment, the adoption of technology, building infrastructure, and worker training. She notes governments can help not only by, for example, reducing taxes but also by removing barriers that get in the way of responsible investment.

== Honors and awards ==
Wilkins was awarded an Honorary Doctor of Laws degree by Wilfrid Laurier University in 2022.

In 2015, she won the J. Alex Murray Lazaridis School Alumni Award in recognition of her outstanding career success and service to Wilfrid Laurier University.

Wilkins was a winner of Canada's Most Powerful Women: Top 100 Award by the Women's Executive Network in 2016 and 2018 in the category of Public Sector Leaders.

== Personal life ==
Wilkins has a partner, Victor, and a son named Samuel.
