= Journal of International Money and Finance =

- Discipline: International finance
- Language: English
- Edited by: J. Aizenman and M.D. Chinn

Publication details
- History: 1982-present
- Publisher: Elsevier
- Impact factor: 2.731 (2020)

Standard abbreviations
- ISO 4: J. Int. Money Finance

Indexing
- ISSN: 0261-5606 (print); 1873-0639 (web)
- LCCN: 84641746
- OCLC no.: 8608679

Links
- Journal homepage; Online archive

The Journal of International Money and Finance is a peer-reviewed academic journal in economics that was established in 1982 . It was originally published by Butterworth–Heinemann, then by Pergamon, which is now incorporated into Elsevier. The editor-in-chief is J.R. Lothian (Fordham University).

== History ==
According to its first editor, Michael R. Darby, the journal was established to cope with the explosive growth of research on international finance. In its focus on this field, the journal used a broad definition encompassing, among others, topics such as optimum currency area, international financial institutions, open economy macroeconomics, and international asset pricing models.

== Abstracting and indexing ==
The journal is abstracted and indexed by ABI/Inform, Journal of Economic Literature, Current Contents/Social & Behavioral Sciences, and the Social Sciences Citation Index. According to the Journal Citation Reports, the journal has a 2020 impact factor of 2.731.
