= Wilfrid Laurier University =

Public university in Ontario, Canada

Coordinates: 43°28′31.21″N 80°31′38.08″W

- Official seal of the university
- Former name: Waterloo Lutheran University (1960–1973)
- Motto: Veritas Omnia Vincit (Latin)
- Motto in English: "Truth conquers all"
- Type: Public university
- Established: 1911 (115 years ago)
- Academic affiliations: COU; Universities Canada
- Endowment: CA$71.6 million
- Chancellor: Nadir Patel
- President: Deborah MacLatchy
- Academic staff: 553
- Undergraduates: 17,000 full-time, 1,541 part-time
- Postgraduates: 2,200
- Location: Waterloo, Ontario, Canada
- Campuses: Waterloo; Brantford; Milton
- Newspaper: The Cord
Colours
Purple and gold
- Nickname: Golden Hawks
- Sporting affiliations: U Sports – OUA
- Mascot: Midas the Golden Hawk
- Website: wlu.ca

Wilfrid Laurier University (WLU or simply Laurier) is a Public university in Ontario, Canada, with campuses in Waterloo, Brantford and Milton. It is named in honour of Sir Wilfrid Laurier, the seventh prime minister of Canada. Laurier offers undergraduate and graduate programs in a variety of fields with over 17,000 full-time undergraduate students, over 1,000 full-time graduate students, and nearly 4,000 part-time students as of late 2019. Laurier's varsity teams, known as the Laurier Golden Hawks, compete in the West Conference of the Ontario University Athletics, affiliated with U Sports.

== History ==
In 1910, the Lutheran Synod established a seminary, which opened to students in 1911, under the name Evangelical Lutheran Theological Seminary of Eastern Canada. In 1914, the seminary expanded its offerings to include non-theological courses and adopted the name "the Waterloo College School." In 1924, the institution evolved into the Waterloo College of Arts.

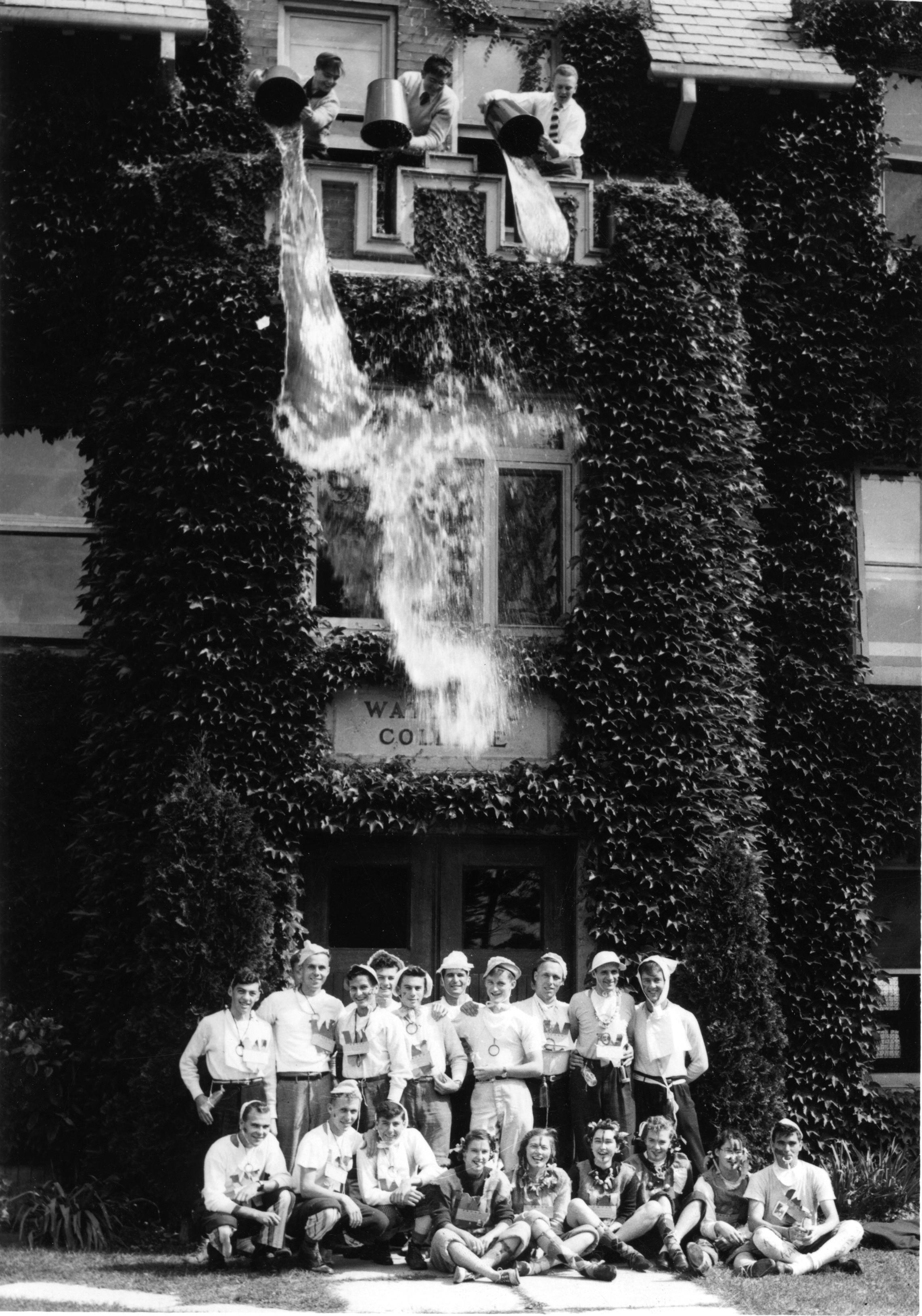
Waterloo College freshmen gathered in front of Willison Hall during initiation week 1947, with seniors on the balcony above them dumping water on them

It became affiliated with the University of Western Ontario ("Western") in 1925 and introduced honours degree programs in the arts.

In 1960, the Lutheran Church transitioned its sponsorship of Waterloo College, resulting in a revised charter that led to the renaming of the seminary to Waterloo Lutheran University. This name was subsequently changed to Wilfrid Laurier University on November 1, 1973, following the enactment of the relevant provincial law by Ontario Lieutenant-Governor Ross Macdonald, who later served as Laurier's chancellor. The name honoured Wilfrid Laurier; while the former Prime Minister of Canada had no local connections, the university retained its WLU abbreviation. The seminary and theological programs of Waterloo Lutheran University continued to be offered by the affiliated Waterloo Lutheran Seminary. The change of name was officially approved by the Waterloo Lutheran board of governors during a meeting held on June 12, 1973.

Laurier's school colours are purple and gold.

=== Expansion ===
In 1999, Laurier expanded its footprint by establishing a second campus in Brantford. Additionally, in 2006, the Lyle S. Hallman Faculty of Social Work relocated from the Waterloo campus to a campus situated in downtown Kitchener. The Brantford campus is centred around a cluster of historic properties in the downtown area, which have been restored for academic purposes. These include a former Carnegie library, Brantford's 1880 post office, and a 1950 Odeon theatre.

On April 18, 2018, Wilfrid Laurier University received approval for a new campus location in Milton. In collaboration with Conestoga College, this new campus was slated to be constructed within the Milton Education Village. The Milton campus, as outlined on WLU's website, was aligned with a program offering focus on science, technology, engineering, arts, and mathematics (STEAM). However, due to budget constraints imposed by the then-government, the plan for this STEAM-focused academic venture, along with expansion on other campuses, was canceled. The plan for the Milton campus was later approved in June 2021 and its first class opened in the autumn of 2024.

== Academics ==
University rankings

World rankings
- USNWR World: 1271

Canadian rankings
- USNWR National: 29
- Maclean's Comprehensive: 10
- Maclean's Reputation: 23

The university has an enrolment of about 17,000 full-time and part-time undergraduate students, and over 1,500 full-time and part-time graduate students. It has over 500 faculty and staff members. Laurier has been transitioning from a primarily undergraduate university to a mid-size research university. In the 2022 Maclean's magazine survey of Canadian universities, Laurier was ranked seventh out of 15 Canadian universities in the magazine's comprehensive university category.

The registrar's report for winter 2016 indicates that the six most popular majors at Laurier, across the entire university, were (in order): business, communications studies, psychology, criminology, economics, and biology.

A September 2017 report indicated that students could choose to concentrate in composition, comprehensive, music education, music history, theory and critical analysis, performance, or community music; second-year Bachelor of Music students could take music therapy as an option. In addition, Laurier is home to the Penderecki String Quartet - an internationally-recognised group playing largely new compositions. The music faculty boasts two performance spaces, the Theatre Auditorium and the Maureen Forrester Recital Hall (named after a contralto and former chancellor of Laurier). Laurier's strength in "music and business education" has been identified as one of the reasons that the Waterloo region is a "powerful educational hub" by former University of Waterloo president, and former governor-general of Canada, David Johnston. Laurier was named Canada's Best Music Campus by CBC Radio in 2013.

Demographics of student body (2015–16)
	Undergraduate	Graduate
Male	44.9%	40.7%
Female	55.1%	59.3%
Canadian student	94.8%	93.7%
International student	5.2%	6.3%

According to Maclean's, "Standout Programs" at Laurier in 2017–2018 included business administration, game design and development, and law and arts (BA from Laurier and a law degree from the University of Sussex in the U.K. in six years).

The Balsillie School of International Affairs, opened in uptown Waterloo in 2008, is a partnership between Laurier, the University of Waterloo, and the Centre for International Governance Innovation. The Balsillie School offers three programs: a masters in arts in global governance, a masters in international public policy and a PhD program in global governance.

=== Cooperative education ===
Laurier has the oldest business cooperative education ("co-op") program in English-speaking Canada and the largest business co-op program in Canada. Students are able to enjoy co-op opportunities with dozens of companies, including KPMG, Ernst and Young, PepsiCo, Scotiabank, Unilever, and Manulife Financial.

=== Laurier Library ===
As of the 2014–2015 annual report, the Laurier Library holds 1 million print volumes, 312,000 electronic books, 68,000 electronic journals, and 280 databases, thousands of media titles (about 5,000 including streaming and DVDs). In addition, the library is a member of the tri-university "group of libraries" (University of Waterloo, University of Guelph, Wilfrid Laurier University), through which access to a combined information collection in excess of seven million print items is available.

There are three physical locations for the library: the Waterloo campus' primary library (on the west end of the campus, housing the majority of the collection and the majority of the librarians and staff), the Brantford campus' digital library and learning commons space (in Grand River Hall, which includes offices for the librarians on that campus) and the collection space in the Brantford Public Library (on the first and second floors), and the Social Work Library in Kitchener.

The library hosts an institutional repository devoted to Laurier scholarship. It houses faculty scholarship, theses, dissertations, online journals, and an archival collection of The Cord dating to 1926.

=== Lazaridis School of Business & Economics ===
The Lazaridis School of Business & Economics is the business school of Wilfrid Laurier, and is located in Waterloo, Ontario. With more than 160 full-time and 60 part-time faculty, the school is the largest faculty at Wilfrid. As of 2018, the School had over 30,000 alumni. In 2010, it was named an "outstanding business school" by The Princeton Review. The school is accredited by the Association to Advance Collegiate Schools of Business (AACSB International) for all of its undergraduate, master's, and PhD programs.

==== History ====
Originally the "School of Business & Economics," it was renamed in September 2015 after Mike Lazaridis, co-founder of Research In Motion, and former Chancellor of the University of Waterloo. The re-branding followed a 2015 announcement of his pledge of $20-million for a new technology-focused management institute at the business school. In 2016, the School moved to the new Lazaridis Hall building.

==== Collaboration ====
A program in association with the University of Waterloo confers double degrees. The Lazaridis School offers a part-time MBA program in downtown Toronto at the St. Andrew's Club and Conference Centre.

==== Locations ====
The Waterloo campus offers full-time and part-time PhD, MBA, Master's, Economics and Honours Bachelor of Business Administration; the Brantford, Ontario campus offers a Bachelor of Business Technology Management program (as part of the Lazaridis School). Diploma programs in Accounting and Business Administration are also offered by the Lazaridis School.

== Campuses ==
Laurier maintains multiple campuses in Southern Ontario. The newer Brantford and Milton campuses are not considered satellite campuses of the original Waterloo campus; instead the university describes itself as a "multi-campus multi-community university". The university also operates offices in Kitchener, Toronto, and Yellowknife.

=== Waterloo campus ===
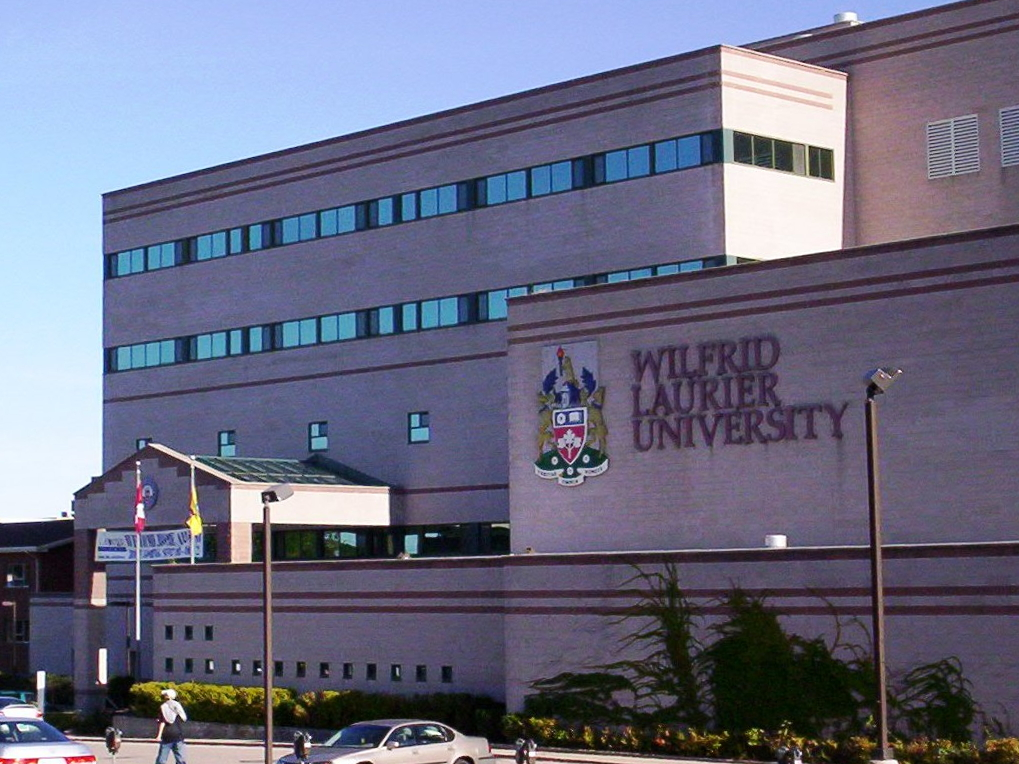
The main campus in Waterloo

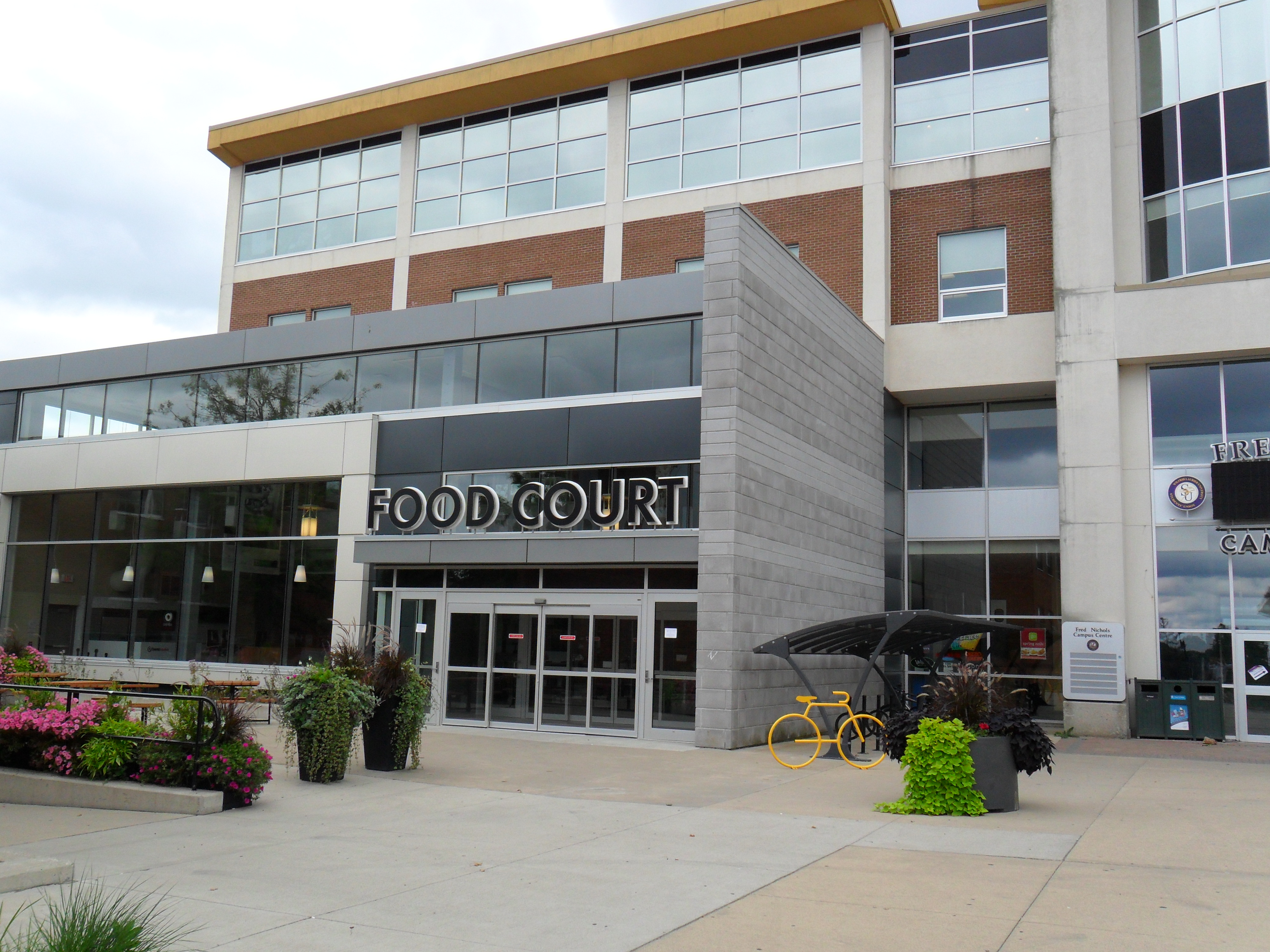
Laurier Food Court

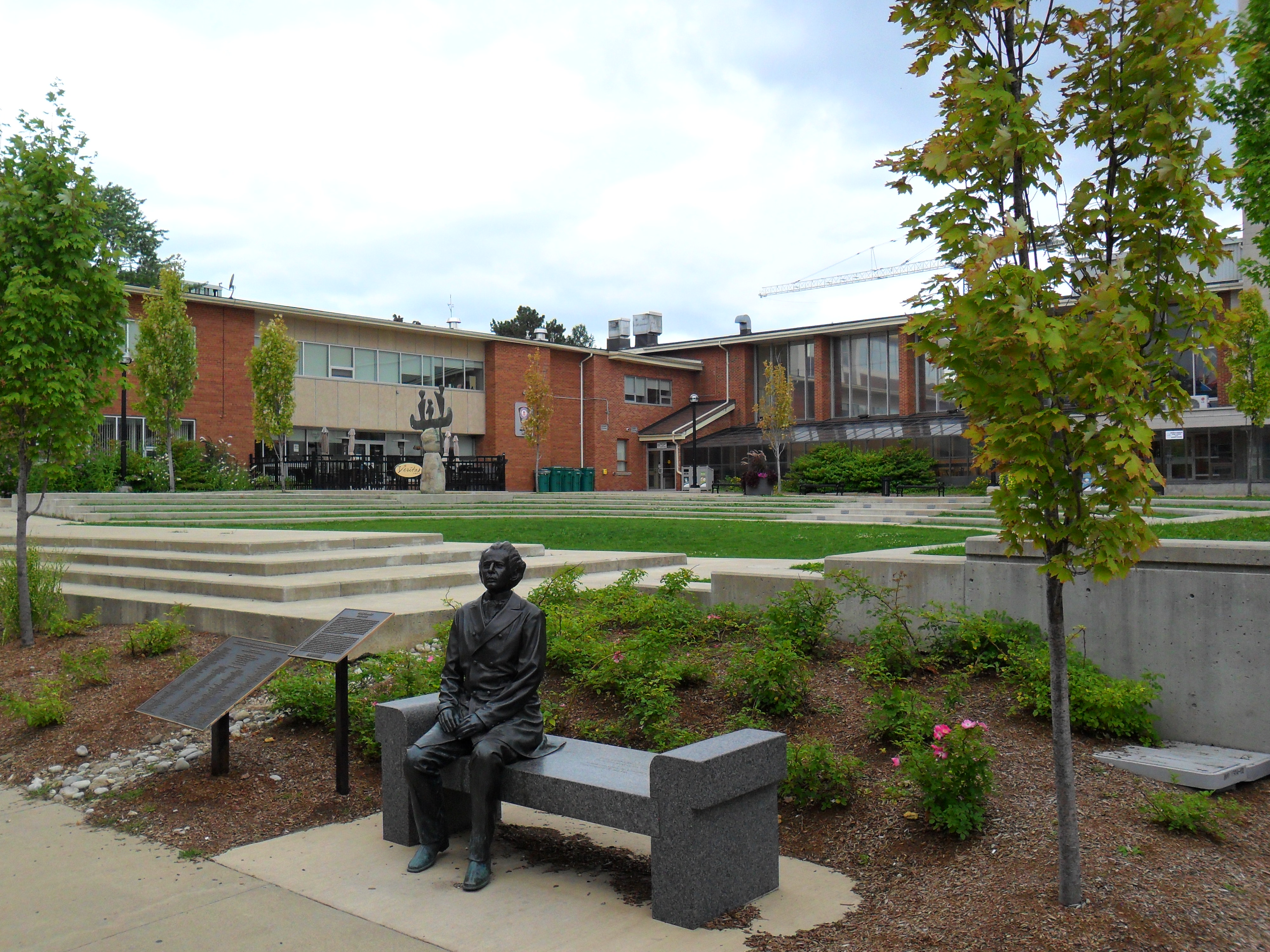
Laurier Central Garden with Sir Wilfrid Laurier statue

Laurier's Waterloo Campus is located in the Regional Municipality of Waterloo.

==== Residences ====
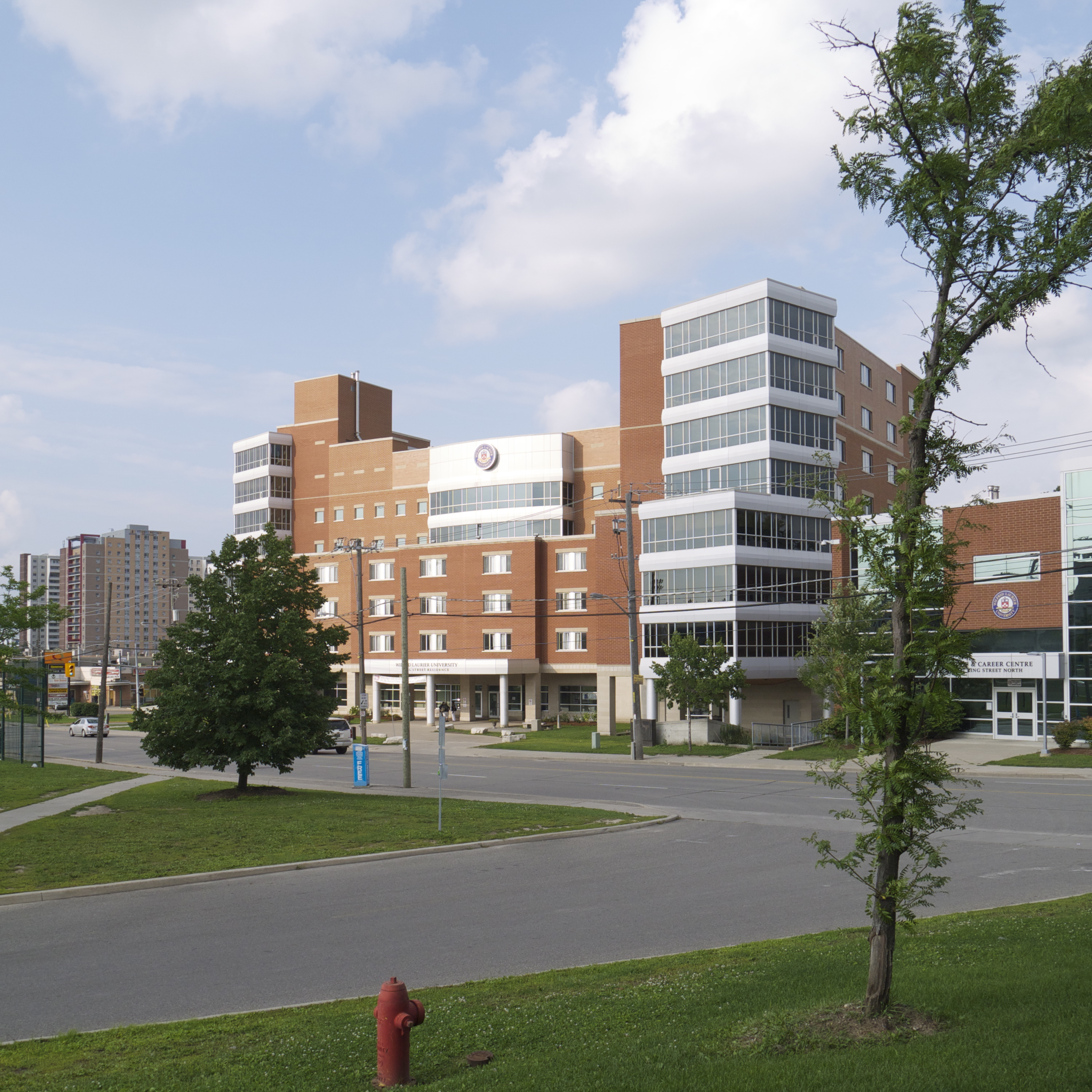
King Street Residence

Laurier Waterloo operates one all female residence (Leupold Residence), one all male residence (Euler Residence), and multiple co-ed student residences. Together, these residences house approximately 2,780 men and women, with 2,664 beds reserved for undergraduate first-year students.

When applying to residences, students can choose to be a part of a Residence Learning Community, a themed residence environment.

=== Brantford campus ===
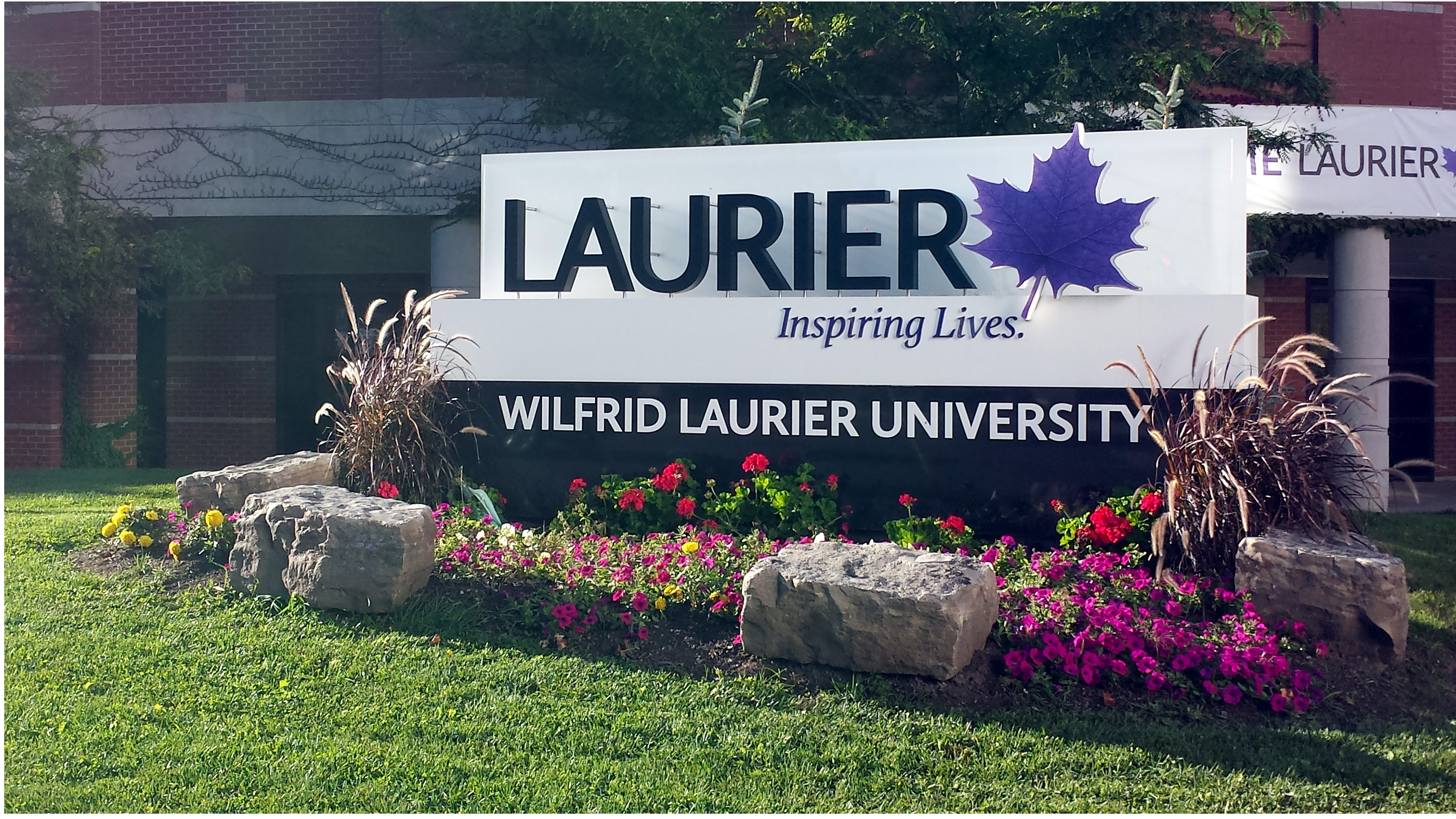
Laurier landmark sign, at the corner of King Street North and Bricker Avenue

Laurier's Brantford Campus is located in Brantford, Ontario, approximately 50 km south of the campus in Waterloo. The campus opened its doors in 1999 with a total of 39 students in its inaugural year. As of January 2015, there were 2,625 full-time students, and an unstated number of part-time students, enrolled at the school. In late 2017, Laurier estimated a total of over 3,000 students.

According to Maclean's, Laurier's "Standout Programs" in 2017-2018 included Game Design and Development at the Brantford campus. "The program develops skills not only in game design, project management and entrepreneurship, but also considers how transformative games are used in areas such as education, corporate training, health care and more."

=== Kitchener campus ===
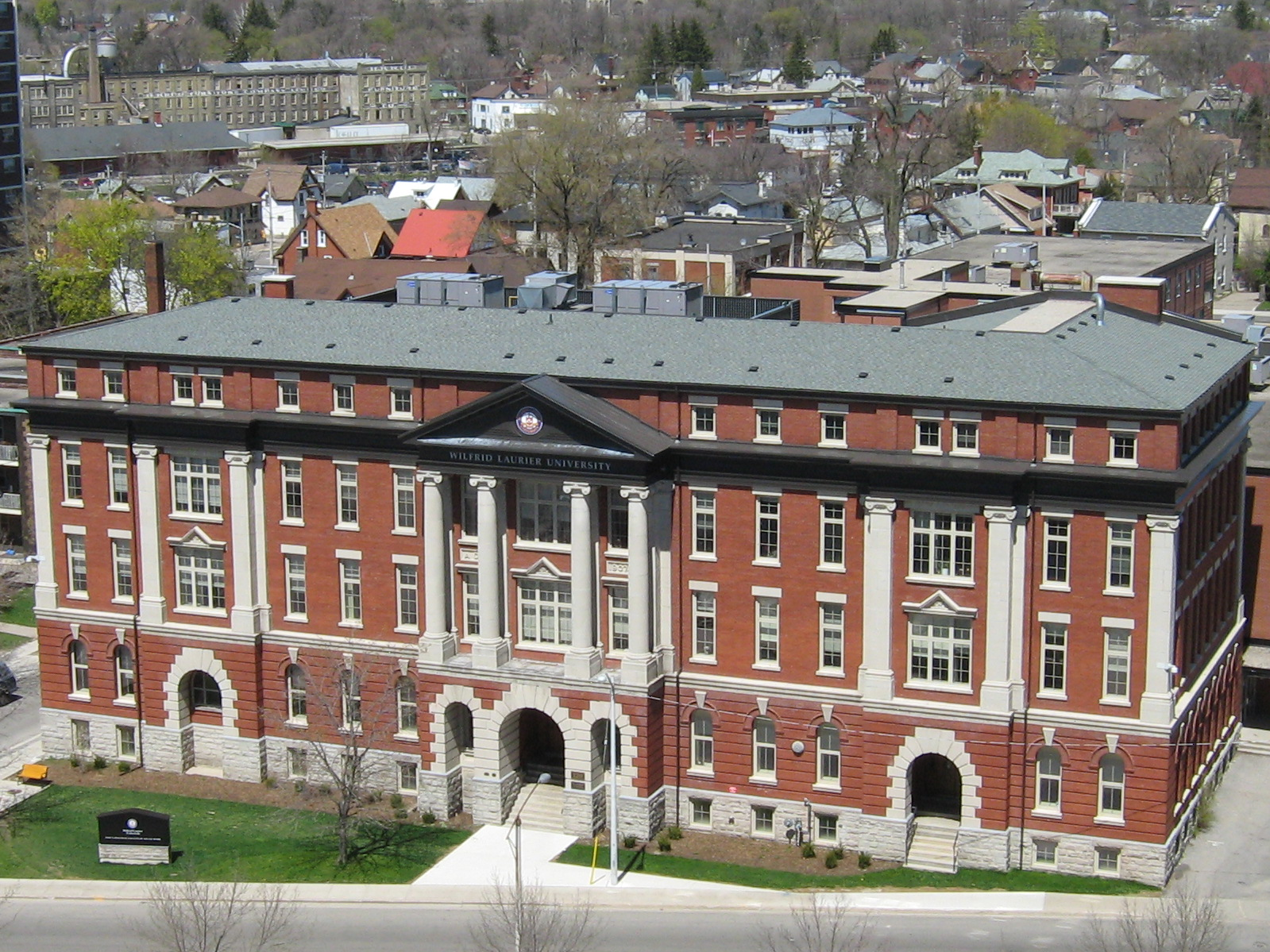
Home of Faculty of Social Work, downtown Kitchener. Formerly St. Jerome's high school.

In late 2006 the Faculty of Social Work (previously on the Waterloo campus) moved to downtown Kitchener. Located on Duke St. it moved into the old St. Jerome's High School built in 1907, closed by Waterloo County Separate School Board in 1990 and was designated a heritage site by the City of Kitchener in 1993.

The move by WLU allowed the students to be closer to the community and social service agencies with which they are partnered. The old high school College Street wing with gym and pool were destroyed in a fire in 2003. The high school was formerly associated with St. Jerome College, which became a federate college of the University of Waterloo in 1960.

=== Milton campus ===
The town of Milton, Ontario and Laurier have worked together since 2008 to develop a 150-acre campus in Milton within the planned Milton Education Village (MEV) on land donated by the town. In April 2018, the provincial party then in power announced a funding plan ($90 million) for the MEV that would accommodate a satellite campus of the university and also of Conestoga College, a recent partner in the project. Construction was expected to conclude in Q3 of 2021; in the meantime, Laurier would offer credit courses in rented premises, commencing in September 2019.

In October 2018, the new Conservative government, elected in June 2018, withdrew the funding before any construction had begun, citing a greater than expected provincial deficit, effectively canceling plans for the Milton campus. Mayor Gordon Krantz said the town would explore alternatives for funding the Milton Education Village campus. A Laurier news release said that the university would continue working with the town and other partners to fund the campus.

As of 2019, Laurier offered some services in Milton, including a Master of Education program at the Milton Education Village Innovation Centre and a Lecture Series. During the summer months, Laurier runs the Enriched Academic Program (LEAP) day camp.

The Milton campus plan was approved in June 2021, and its first class opened in the autumn of 2024.

== Campus safety ==
A 2015 survey found that 40% of Wilfrid Laurier students had experienced gendered violence, and 13.4% of Wilfrid Laurier students had experienced sexual assault. Also in 2015, Wilfrid Laurier University was criticized for allowing a male student accused of raping a female student in her dorm room to continue to attend classes alongside his accuser.

== Athletics ==
The university is represented in U Sports, formerly Canadian Interuniversity Sport (CIS), by the Laurier Golden Hawks. They are a part of the Ontario University Athletics (OUA) conference.

The history of the team name (Golden Hawks) dates back to 1961. For many years, the Waterloo College teams were called simply the Waterloo College teams, although sometimes they were called the Purple and Gold and other times the Waterloons. In 1950, the college's newspaper mused that a name was needed, and in December 1951 a new name was tested: the Mules.

Subsequently, the hockey team became the Ice Mules and the women's basketball and volleyball teams were known as the Mulettes.

In 1960, with the shift from college to university status, the university student newspaper again lobbied for change. At a meeting that year, somebody suggested Golden Hawks and that was the name adopted. A headline in the January 16, 1961 issue of the newspaper read "From 'Jackass' to 'Bird of Prey'".

Laurier's first female national championship was won in 1992 by the women's soccer team, which followed that up with their second CIS title in 1995. The men's soccer team claimed back-to-back national championships in 2000 & 2001.

In 2008, both the men's and women's curling teams won the inaugural CIS Championships and represented Canada in China at the 2009 World University Games. The women's team repeated as CIS Champion's in 2009 in Montreal and went on to represent Canada in the Karuizawa International Curling championships where they claimed first place.

=== Facilities ===
The athletic facilities at Wilfrid Laurier University include an athletic complex, a football stadium and an outdoor multi-purpose fieldturf field. The athletic complex houses three gyms, two squash courts, an Olympic-size swimming pool, a rock-climbing wall, and aerobics/weight rooms. University Stadium includes a fieldturf football field and a large indoor gymnasium.

=== School song ===
Laurier's school song is "Laurier We'll Praise Thee Ever" (originally titled "Waterloo We'll Praise Thee Ever"). It was written by Maxwell A. Magee in 1938. The song was revived in 2005 by the WLU Alumni Choir, and the words were adapted to reflect the change from Waterloo College to Wilfrid Laurier University.

== Students' union ==
The Wilfrid Laurier University Students' Union (WLUSU) represents undergraduate students at both campuses of Wilfrid Laurier University. It operates the Fred Nichols Campus Centre in Waterloo as well as the Students' Centre on Laurier's Brantford Campus. Wilfrid Laurier University Students' Union's Arms, Supporters, Flag and Badge were registered with the Canadian Heraldic Authority on January 15, 2003.

WLUSU is funded by undergraduate student fees, and all students are automatically members. The Students' Union provides a number of services for students, including bus passes, Direct2U Prescription, emergency response team, food bank, foot patrol, health and dental insurance coverage, the member card, peer-help line, student life line, and tech share. The Wilfrid Laurier University Students' Union Clubs and Associations department supports over 130 clubs and associations involving over 3,000 students. Clubs and Associations supports all clubs by offering resources and financial support as well as acting as a liaison to the Students' Union and University administration.

== Alumni ==
Laurier has over 100,000 graduates from 85 countries. Among them are Carolyn A. Wilkins, the first woman appointed senior deputy governor of the Bank of Canada; Paul Heinbecker, Canada's ambassador to the UN (2000–2004); Bill Downe, CEO of Bank of Montreal (2007–2017); and stock exchange founder Brad Katsuyama.
