= Joseph G. Haubrich =

American economist

Joseph Gerard Haubrich (born September 10, 1958) is an economist and consultant. His work focuses on financial institution and regulations research.

== Personal ==
Haubrich was born on September 10, 1958, in Oak Park, Illinois, to Joseph Haubrich and Alfreda Haubrich. He grew up in Boulder, Colorado and graduated from Regis Jesuit High School.

== Education and career ==
Haubrich earned his bachelor's degree in economics at the University of Chicago and his masters and PhD in economics from the University of Rochester in New York. After completing his doctorate, Joseph was an assistant professor at University of Pennsylvania's business school, Wharton School in Philadelphia. He taught finance to graduate students. In 1990, Joseph joined the Federal Reserve Bank of Cleveland as an economist and consultant in the research department. He served vice president at the Cleveland Federal Reserve Bank of Cleveland and led the Research Department's Banking and Financial Institutions Group. Joseph is a senior economic and policy advisor at the Cleveland Fed. Financial institutions and regulations research are two subjects he specializes in.

In addition to being a research economist, Joseph also examines and referees numerous educational and professional journals and writings.

== Economic Research ==
Joseph Haubrich is a research economist and conducts research concerning regulatory policy and banking issues and provides advice on financial policy formulation with a special emphasis on fixed income markets.

His areas of expertise include:

- Financial institutions
- Regulatory policy
- Term structure of interest rates
- Yield curve
- Imperfect information models
- Real effect of financial crises
- Executive compensation

=== Yield Curve Research ===
Haubrich is well known in the economic and finance world for his research and work on the yield curve, specifically using an inverted yield curve to predict recessions. The academic journal Annual Review of Financial Economics published his paper titled "Does the Yield Curve Predict Output?" which details the yield curve and recession correlation. His research work evaluates how well the yield curve predicts recessions and future output, in addition to how the yield curve can be used to measure expected inflation.

==== Publications about the yield curve ====
- “The Yield Curve as a Predictor of Growth: Long-Run Evidence, 1875-1997.” in 2008 by Bordo, Michael D., and Joseph G. Haubrich. Published by he Review of Economics and Statistics.
- "Does the Yield Curve Signal Recession" in 2006 by Joseph G. Haubrich
- "Predicting Real Growth Using the Yield Curve" in 1996 by Haubrich, Joseph G., and Dombrosky, Ann M. Published in the Economic Review.

=== Peak Oil ===
He co-wrote "Peak Oil" which is an economic commentary with Brent Meyer that discusses the economic effects of the world's oil production. This piece is used in a variety of research, detailing on the relationship between oil, the economy, and society.

== Work and Publications ==
Haubrich's economic research has been published in a variety of academic and professional journals. He has also served on the editorial board for several professional journals, including The Journal of Money, Credit and Banking. He writes frequently for the Annual Reports, including Putting Systemic Risk on the Radar Screen in the 2009 Annual Report. This report selection describes and analyzes the United States' 2008 financial crisis, regulatory reforms, plans to break up huge companies, consumer protection agencies, derivatives, insurance companies, and hedge funds.

On Mortgage-backed security, Joseph wrote and was quoted "A collateralized mortgage obligation (CMO) is a more complex MBS in which the mortgages are ordered into tranches by some quality (such as repayment time), with each tranche sold as a separate security."

=== Some of Haubrich's numerous articles, publications and papers include ===
- W(h)ither the Fed's Balance Sheet in July 2010 by Joseph G. Haubrich, John B. Carlson, and John Linder
- Inflation: Noise, Risk, and Expectations in June 2010 by Joseph G. Haubrich and Timothy Bianco
- A New Approach to Gauging Inflation Expectations in October 2009 by Joseph G. Haubrich
- Credit Crises, Money and Contradictions:A Historical View in September 2009 by Joseph G. Haubrich and Michael D. Bordo
- Umbrella Supervision and the Role of the Central Bank for the Journal of Banking Regulation Volume 57 No. 1, by Joseph G. Haubrich and James B. Thomson in November 2008
- "How Cyclical Is Bank Capital?" by Joseph G. Haubrich; published in 2015.

Joseph Haubrich is also listed as one of the top 5% of authors according to the criteria from IDEAS from RePEc

Joseph co-edited the book "Quantifying Systemic Risk" with Andrew Lo, and addresses the challenges faced when measuring statistical risk This book was released in 2013.

== Featured Publications ==
Some of Joseph's notable and widely-known economic publications include:

- “Does the Yield Curve Predict Output?” Annual Review of Financial Economics, 2021 (November): 13: 341–362.
- “Inflation Expectations, Real Rates, and Risk Premia: Evidence from Inflation Swaps.” With George Pennacchi and Peter Ritchken. Review of Financial Studies, 2012, 25(5): 1588–1629.
- “Credit Crises, Money, and Contractions: An Historical View.” With Michael D. Bordo. Journal of Monetary Economics, 2010, 57(1): 1–18.
- “Risk Aversion, Performance Pay, and the Principal–Agent Problem.” Journal of Political Economy, 1994, 102(2): 258–276.

== Documentary ==
In 2014, Joseph produced a documentary film titled "Panic of 1907" that illustrates how the panic led to the creation of the Federal Reserve system. This film stemmed from a 2012 study he worked on with Michael Bordo at the Cleveland Federal Reserve Bank. A paper covering this topic is titled Deep Recessions, Fast Recoveries, and Financial Crises: Evidence from the American Record written in conjunction with Bordo in 2013.

This film can be viewed at the Museum of American Finance and was produced for the Learning Center and Money Museum located at the Federal Reserve Bank of Cleveland.

The "Panic of 1907" documentary was featured in the Chagrin Falls Documentary Film Festival in 2015 in the "Shorts" category.
